= List of United Nations Security Council Resolutions 2001 to 2100 =

This is a list of United Nations Security Council Resolutions 2001 to 2100 adopted between 28 July 2011 and 25 April 2013.

Resolution	Date	Vote	Concerns
2001	28 July 2011	15–0–0	Extends mandate of the United Nations Assistance Mission in Iraq
2002	29 July 2011	15–0–0	Tightens sanctions against Eritrea and Somalia
2003	29 July 2011	15–0–0	Extends mandate of the African Union – United Nations Hybrid Operation in Darfur
2004	30 August 2011	15–0–0	Extends mandate of the United Nations Interim Force in Lebanon
2005	14 September 2011	15–0–0	Extends mandate of the United Nations Integrated Peacebuilding Office in Sierra Leone
2006	14 September 2011	15–0–0	Allows temporary judges at the International Criminal Tribunal for Rwanda to vote and stand as candidates for the presidency
2007	14 September 2011	15–0–0	Extends terms of offices for judges at the International Criminal Tribunal for the former Yugoslavia
2008	16 September 2011	15–0–0	The situation in Liberia
2009	16 September 2011	15–0–0	Establishes of the United Nations Support Mission in Libya
2010	30 September 2011	15–0–0	The situation in Somalia
2011	12 October 2011	15–0–0	Extends authorisation of the International Security Assistance Force in Afghanistan
2012	14 October 2011	15–0–0	Extends mandate of the United Nations Stabilization Mission in Haiti
2013	14 October 2011	15–0–0	Allows a judge at the International Criminal Tribunal for Rwanda to work part-time
2014	21 October 2011	15–0–0	The situation in Yemen
2015	24 October 2011	15–0–0	The situation in Somalia
2016	27 October 2011	15–0–0	Termination of military intervention in Libya
2017	31 October 2011	15–0–0	The situation in Libya
2018	31 October 2011	15–0–0	Peace and security in Africa
2019	16 November 2011	15–0–0	The situation in Bosnia and Herzegovina
2020	22 November 2011	15–0–0	The situation in Somalia
2021	29 November 2011	15–0–0	The situation concerning the Democratic Republic of the Congo
2022	2 December 2011	15–0–0	Extends mandate of the United Nations Support Mission in Libya
2023	5 December 2011	13–0–2 (abstentions: China, Russian Federation)	Peace and security in Africa
2024	14 December 2011	15–0–0	Reports of the Secretary-General on the Sudan
2025	14 December 2011	15–0–0	The situation in Liberia
2026	14 December 2011	15–0–0	Extends mandate of the United Nations Peacekeeping Force in Cyprus
2027	20 December 2011	15–0–0	The situation in Burundi
2028	21 December 2011	15–0–0	The situation in the Middle East
2029	21 December 2011	15–0–0	Allows a judge at the International Criminal Tribunal for Rwanda to work part-time
2030	21 December 2011	15–0–0	The situation in Guinea-Bissau
2031	21 December 2011	15–0–0	The situation in Central African Republic
2032	22 December 2011	15–0–0	Reports of the Secretary-General on the Sudan
2033	12 January 2012	15–0–0	Peace and security in Africa
2034	19 January 2012	Adopted without vote	Election and vacancy at the International Court of Justice
2035	17 February 2012	15–0–0	Reports of the Secretary-General on the Sudan
2036	22 February 2012	15–0–0	The situation in Somalia
2037	23 February 2012	15–0–0	The situation in East Timor
2038	29 February 2012	15–0–0	International Criminal Tribunal for the former Yugoslavia
2039	29 February 2012	15–0–0	Peace and security in Africa
2040	12 March 2012	15–0–0	Extends mandate of the United Nations Support Mission in Libya
2041	22 March 2012	15–0–0	Extends authorization of the United Nations Assistance Mission in Afghanistan
2042	14 April 2012	15–0–0	Syria observer force resolution
2043	21 April 2012	15–0–0	Establishes of the United Nations Supervision Mission in Syria
2044	24 April 2012	15–0–0	Extends mandate of the United Nations Mission for the Referendum in Western Sahara
2045	26 April 2012	15–0–0	Modified arms embargo, diamond trade ban against Côte d'Ivoire
2046	2 May 2012	15–0–0	Reports of the Secretary-General on the Sudan
2047	17 May 2012	15–0–0	Reports of the Secretary-General on the Sudan
2048	18 May 2012	15–0–0	The situation in Guinea-Bissau
2049	7 June 2012	15–0–0	Extends mandate of expert panel monitoring sanctions against Iran
2050	12 June 2012	15–0–0	Extends mandate of expert panel monitoring Sanctions against North Korea
2051	12 June 2012	15–0–0	The situation in the Middle East
2052	27 June 2012	15–0–0	The situation in the Middle East
2053	27 June 2012	15–0–0	The situation concerning the Democratic Republic of the Congo
2054	29 June 2012	15–0–0	International Criminal Tribunal for Rwanda
2055	29 June 2012	15–0–0	Non-proliferation of weapons of mass destruction
2056	5 July 2012	15–0–0	The situation in Mali
2057	5 July 2012	15–0–0	Reports of the Secretary-General on the Sudan
2058	19 July 2012	13–0–2 (abstentions: Azerbaijan, Pakistan)	Extends mandate of the United Nations Peacekeeping Force in Cyprus
2059	20 July 2012	15–0–0	Extends mandate of the United Nations Supervision Mission in Syria
2060	25 July 2012	15–0–0	The situation in Somalia
2061	25 July 2012	15–0–0	Extends mandate of the United Nations Assistance Mission in Iraq
2062	26 July 2012	15–0–0	Extends mandate of the United Nations Operation in Côte d'Ivoire
2063	31 July 2012	14–0–1 (abstention: Azerbaijan)	Extends mandate of the African Union – United Nations Hybrid Operation in Darfur
2064	30 August 2012	15–0–0	Extends mandate of the United Nations Interim Force in Lebanon
2065	12 September 2012	15–0–0	Extends mandate of the United Nations Integrated Peacebuilding Office in Sierra Leone
2066	17 September 2012	15–0–0	The situation in Liberia
2067	18 September 2012	15–0–0	The situation in Somalia
2068	19 September 2012	11–0–4 (abstentions: Azerbaijan, China, Pakistan, Russian Federation)	Children in armed conflict
2069	9 October 2012	15–0–0	Extends authorisation of the International Security Assistance Force in Afghanistan
2070	12 October 2012	15–0–0	Extends mandate of the United Nations Stabilization Mission in Haiti
2071	12 October 2012	15–0–0	The 2012 Northern Mali conflict
2072	31 October 2012	15–0–0	The situation in Somalia
2073	7 November 2012	15–0–0	The situation in Somalia
2074	14 November 2012	15–0–0	The situation in Bosnia and Herzegovina
2075	16 November 2012	15–0–0	Reports of the Secretary-General on the Sudan
2076	20 November 2012	15–0–0	The situation concerning the Democratic Republic of the Congo
2077	21 November 2012	15–0–0	The situation in Somalia
2078	28 November 2012	15–0–0	The situation in the Democratic Republic of the Congo
2079	12 December 2012	15–0–0	The situation in Liberia
2080	12 December 2012	15–0–0	Allows a judge at the International Criminal Tribunal for Rwanda to work part-time
2081	17 December 2012	14–0–1 (abstention: Russian Federation)	International Criminal Tribunal for the Former Yugoslavia
2082	17 December 2012	15–0–0	Threats to international peace and security caused by terrorist acts.
2083	17 December 2012	15–0–0	Threats to international peace and security caused by terrorist acts.
2084	19 December 2012	15–0–0	The situation in the Middle East.
2085	20 December 2012	15–0–0	The situation in Mali, including sanctions on MOJWA.
2086	21 January 2013	15–0–0	Peace keeping missions of the United Nations
2087	22 January 2013	15–0–0	The situation in North Korea
2088	24 January 2013	15–0–0	The situation in the Central African Republic
2089	24 January 2013	14–0–1 (abstention: Azerbaijan)	The situation in Cyprus
2090	13 February 2013	15–0–0	The situation in Burundi
2091	14 February 2013	15–0–0	The situation in Sudan
2092	22 February 2013	15–0–0	The situation in Guinea-Bissau
2093	6 March 2013	15–0–0	Eases arms embargo on Somalia and extends AMISOM mandate for another year
2094	7 March 2013	15–0–0	Sanctions to limit luxurious imports to North Korea
2095	14 March 2013	15–0–0	The situation in Libya
2096	19 March 2013	15–0–0	The situation in Afghanistan
2097	26 March 2013	15–0–0	The situation in Sierra Leone
2098	28 March 2013	15–0–0	The situation in the Democratic Republic of the Congo
2099	25 April 2013	15–0–0	The situation in Western Sahara
2100	25 April 2013	15–0–0	The situation in Mali

== See also ==
- Lists of United Nations Security Council resolutions
- List of United Nations Security Council Resolutions 1901 to 2000
- List of United Nations Security Council Resolutions 2101 to 2200
