= United Nations Security Council Resolution 2029 =

UN Security Council Resolution 2029
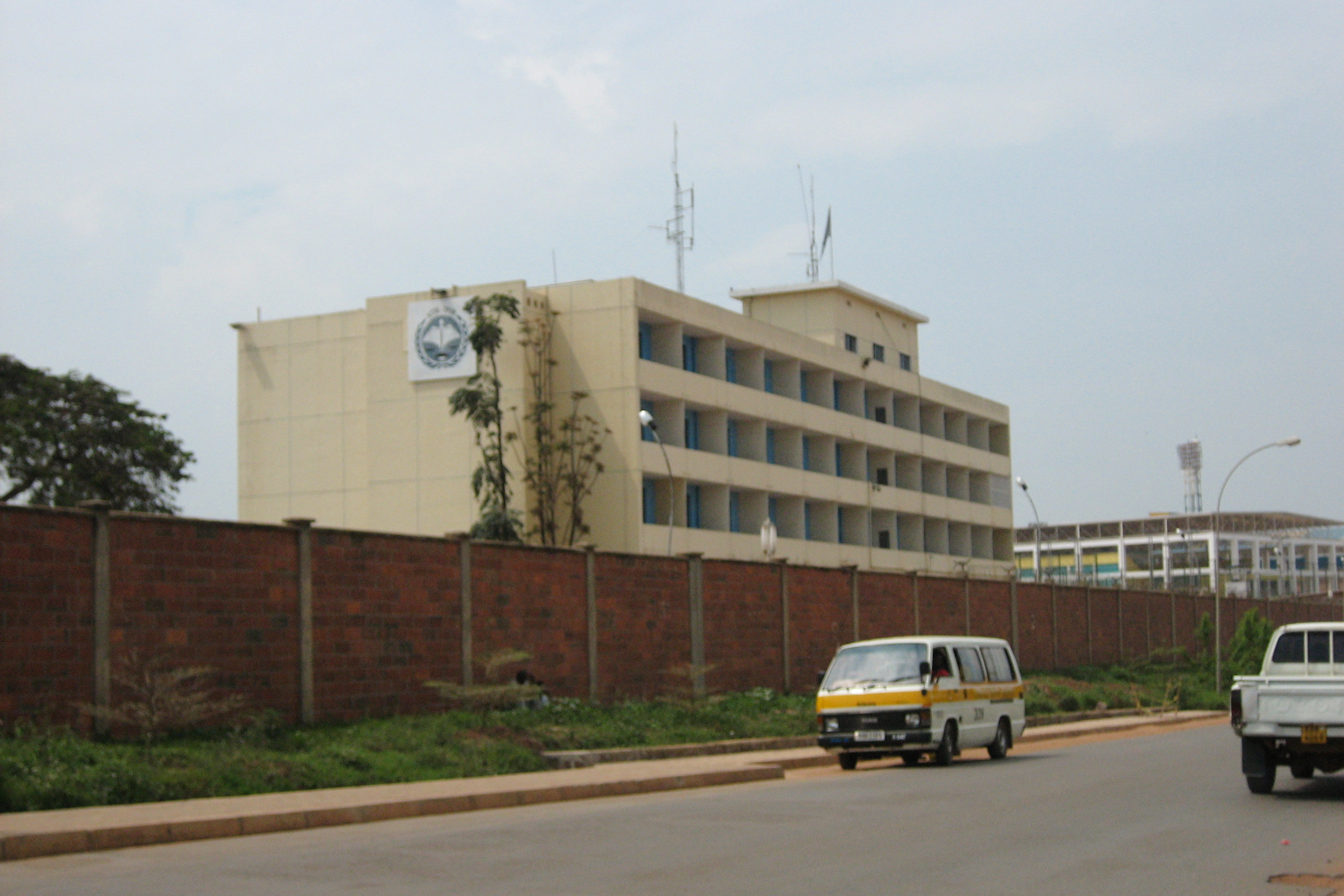
- ICTR building in Kigali, Rwanda
- Date: 21 December 2011
- Meeting no.: 6,694
- Code: S/RES/2029 (Document)
- Subject: International Criminal Tribunal for Rwanda
- Voting summary: 15 voted for; None voted against; None abstained
- Result: Adopted

Security Council composition
- Permanent members: China; France; Russia; United Kingdom; United States
- Non-permanent members: Bosnia–Herzegovina; Brazil; Colombia; Germany; Gabon; India; Lebanon; Nigeria; Portugal; South Africa

United Nations Security Council Resolution 2029 was unanimously adopted on 21 December 2011, after recalling resolution 2013. The Security Council on this morning extended the terms of office of four judges of the Trial Chamber until 30 June 2012 or sooner if their trials were completed.

== See also ==
- List of United Nations Security Council Resolutions 2001 to 2100
