= United Nations Security Council Resolution 2030 =

UN Security Council Resolution 2030
- Flag of Guinea-Bissau
- Date: 21 December 2011
- Meeting no.: 6,695
- Code: S/RES/2030 (Document)
- Subject: The situation in Guinea-Bissau
- Voting summary: 15 voted for; None voted against; None abstained
- Result: Adopted

Security Council composition
- Permanent members: China; France; Russia; United Kingdom; United States
- Non-permanent members: Bosnia–Herzegovina; Brazil; Colombia; Germany; Gabon; India; Lebanon; Nigeria; Portugal; South Africa

United Nations Security Council Resolution 2030 was unanimously adopted on 21 December 2011 after recalling resolution 1949 (2010). The Council called on the Government and political stakeholders in Guinea-Bissau to work together to consolidate peace and stability, use legal and peaceful means to resolve differences and intensify efforts for genuine and inclusive political dialogue and national reconciliation.

== See also ==
- List of United Nations Security Council Resolutions 2001 to 2100
