= United Nations Security Council Resolution 2057 =

UN Security Council Resolution 2057
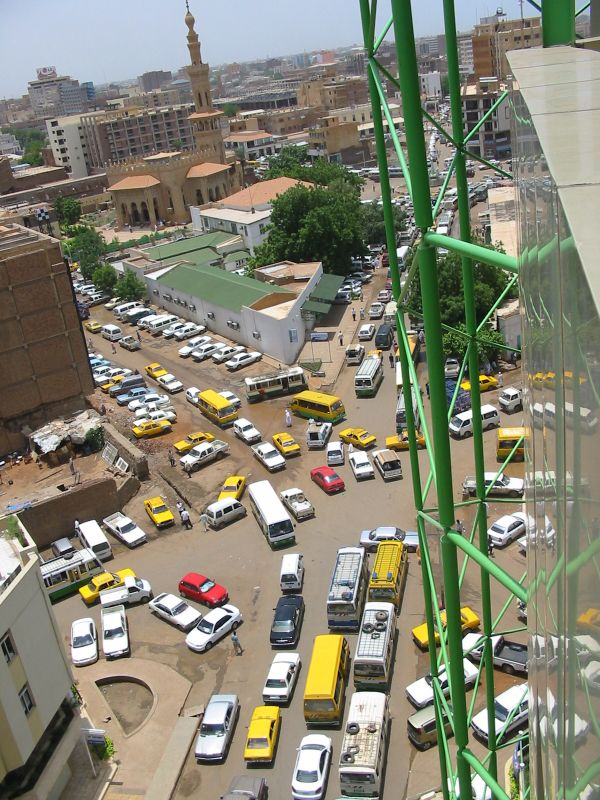
- View of Khartoum
- Date: 5 July 2012
- Meeting no.: 6,800
- Code: S/RES/2057 (Document)
- Subject: Reports of the Secretary-General on the Sudan
- Voting summary: 15 voted for; None voted against; None abstained
- Result: Adopted

Security Council composition
- Permanent members: China; France; Russia; United Kingdom; United States
- Non-permanent members: Azerbaijan; Colombia; Germany; Guatemala; India; Morocco; Pakistan; Portugal; South Africa; Togo

United Nations Security Council Resolution 2057 was unanimously adopted on 5 July 2012. It extended the mission of the United Nations Mission in South Sudan for an additional year.

== See also ==
- List of United Nations Security Council Resolutions 2001 to 2100
