= United Nations Security Council Resolution 2007 =

UN Security Council Resolution 2007
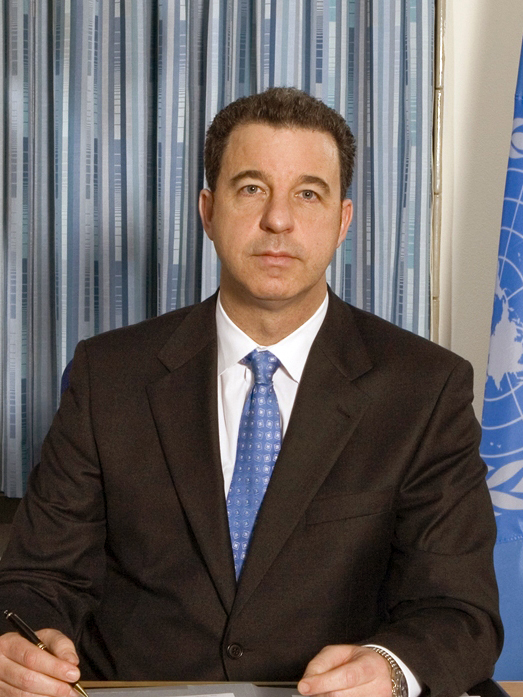
- Serge Brammertz
- Date: 14 September 2011
- Meeting no.: 6,613
- Code: S/RES/2007 (Document)
- Subject: International Criminal Tribunal for the former Yugoslavia
- Voting summary: 15 voted for; None voted against; None abstained
- Result: Adopted

Security Council composition
- Permanent members: China; France; Russia; United Kingdom; United States
- Non-permanent members: Bosnia–Herzegovina; Brazil; Colombia; Germany; Gabon; India; Lebanon; Nigeria; Portugal; South Africa

United Nations Security Council Resolution 2007, unanimously adopted on September 14, 2011, after recalling resolution 1786 (2007) on the International Criminal Tribunal for the former Yugoslavia (ICTY), the Council reappointed Serge Brammertz as prosecutor of the Tribunal, countermanding the Tribunal's statute.

== See also ==
- List of United Nations Security Council Resolutions 2001 to 2100
