= United Nations Security Council Resolution 2058 =

UN Security Council Resolution 2058
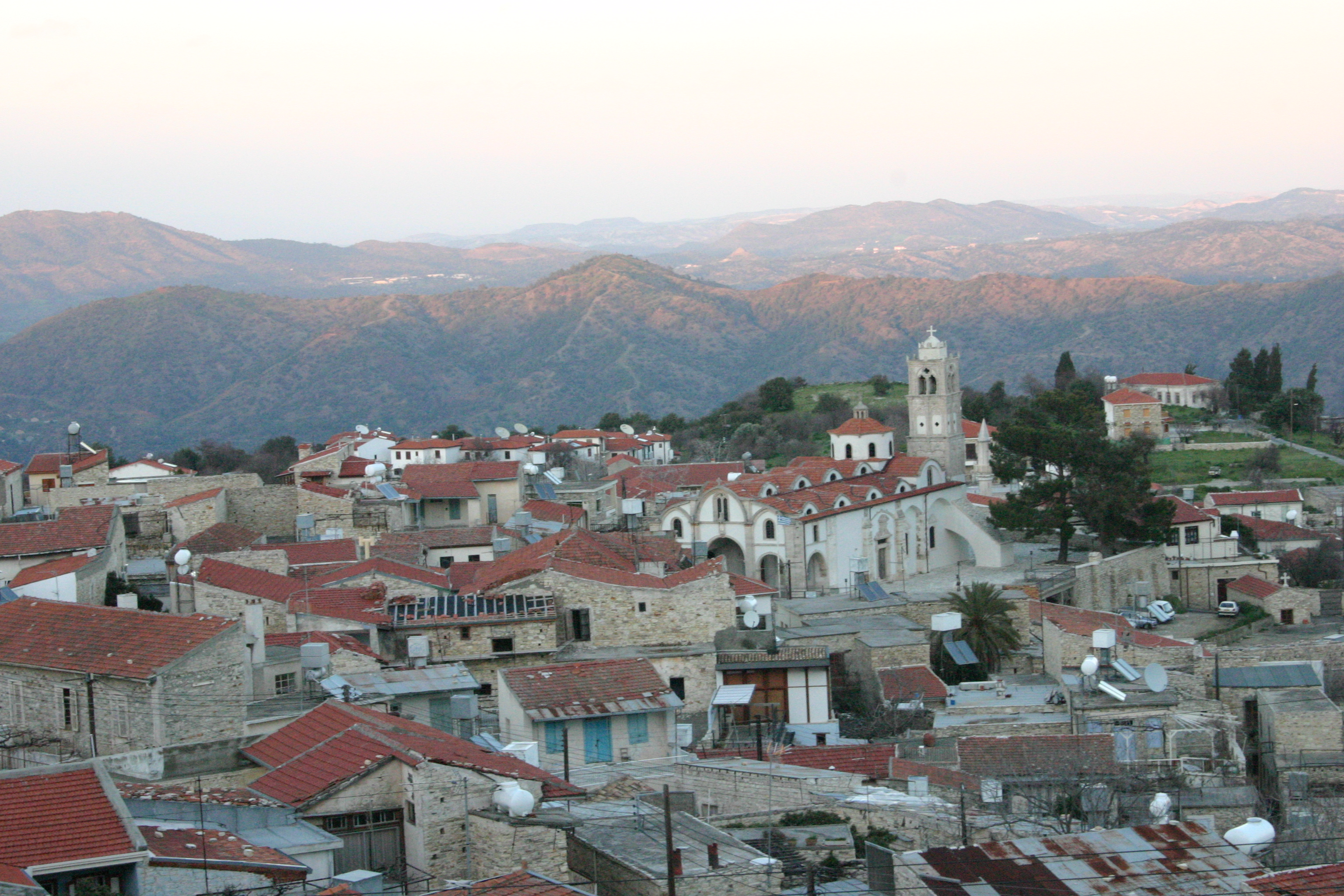
- View of Pano Lefkara
- Date: 19 July 2012
- Meeting no.: 6,809
- Code: S/RES/2058 (Document)
- Subject: The situation in Cyprus
- Voting summary: 13 voted for; None voted against; 2 abstained
- Result: Adopted

Security Council composition
- Permanent members: China; France; Russia; United Kingdom; United States
- Non-permanent members: Azerbaijan; Colombia; Germany; Guatemala; India; Morocco; Pakistan; Portugal; South Africa; Togo

United Nations Security Council Resolution 2058 was unanimously adopted on 19 July 2012. Azerbaijan and Pakistan decided to abstain.

== See also ==
- List of United Nations Security Council Resolutions 2001 to 2100
