= United Nations Security Council Resolution 2037 =

UN Security Council Resolution 2037
- Flag of East Timor
- Date: 23 February 2012
- Meeting no.: 6,721
- Code: S/RES/2037 (Document)
- Subject: The situation in East Timor
- Voting summary: 15 voted for; None voted against; None abstained
- Result: Adopted

Security Council composition
- Permanent members: China; France; Russia; United Kingdom; United States
- Non-permanent members: Azerbaijan; Colombia; Germany; Guatemala; India; Morocco; Pakistan; Portugal; South Africa; Togo

United Nations Security Council Resolution 2037 was unanimously adopted on 23 February 2012.

== See also ==
- List of United Nations Security Council Resolutions 2001 to 2100
