= United Nations Security Council Resolution 2046 =

UN Security Council Resolution 2046
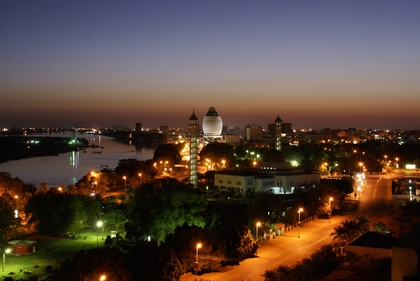
- Khartoum at night
- Date: 2 May 2012
- Meeting no.: 6,764
- Code: S/RES/2046 (Document)
- Subject: Reports of the Secretary-General on the Sudan
- Voting summary: 15 voted for; None voted against; None abstained
- Result: Adopted

Security Council composition
- Permanent members: China; France; Russia; United Kingdom; United States
- Non-permanent members: Azerbaijan; Colombia; Germany; Guatemala; India; Morocco; Pakistan; Portugal; South Africa; Togo

United Nations Security Council Resolution 2046 was unanimously adopted on 2 May 2012.

== Clause 1 of the Resolution ==
1. Sudan and South Sudan shall immediately do all of the following: (i) Immediately ceasefire all hostilities, including aerial bombardments (ii) Unconditionally withdraw all troops to their sides of the border (ii) Activate necessary security mechanisms

== See also ==
- List of United Nations Security Council Resolutions 2001 to 2100
