= United Nations Security Council Resolution 2017 =

UN Security Council Resolution 2017
- Flag of Libya
- Date: 31 October 2011
- Meeting no.: 6,644
- Code: S/RES/2017 (Document)
- Subject: The situation in Libya
- Voting summary: 15 voted for; None voted against; None abstained
- Result: Adopted

Security Council composition
- Permanent members: China; France; Russia; United Kingdom; United States
- Non-permanent members: Bosnia–Herzegovina; Brazil; Colombia; Germany; Gabon; India; Lebanon; Nigeria; Portugal; South Africa

United Nations Security Council Resolution 2017 was unanimously adopted on 31 October 2011.

== Resolution ==
Calling for action to stem the proliferation of portable surface-to-air missiles and other arms from Libya by the country’s interim authorities, regional States and other relevant Member States, the Security Council this afternoon authorized the Libya sanctions committee to propose a strategy to keep such materiel out of the hands of terrorists and others.

Through the unanimous adoption of resolution 2017 (2011), the Council called upon Libyan authorities to take all necessary steps to ensure the proper custody of portable surface-to-air missiles, known as MANPADS (man-portable air defence systems), and all other arms and related materiel, as well as to meet Libya’s arms control, disarmament and non-proliferation obligations under international law, as well as to continue close coordination on the destruction of all stockpiles of chemical weapons with the Organization for the Prohibition of Chemical Weapons.

States in the region were called upon to take appropriate measures to prevent proliferation of those weapons as well. Other Member States and international and regional organizations were called upon take appropriate action to assist the Libyan authorities and States in the region towards that goal.

The Committee established pursuant to resolution 1970 (2011) on Libya sanctions, with assistance from its Panel of Experts and in cooperation with other relevant bodies, was requested to assess threats and challenges, in particular those related to terrorism, posed by the proliferation of weapons. The Committee was asked to submit a report to the Council on proposals to counter those threats, including stockpile management, border control and transport security.

== See also ==
- List of United Nations Security Council Resolutions 2001 to 2100
