= United Nations Security Council Resolution 2076 =

UN Security Council Resolution 2076
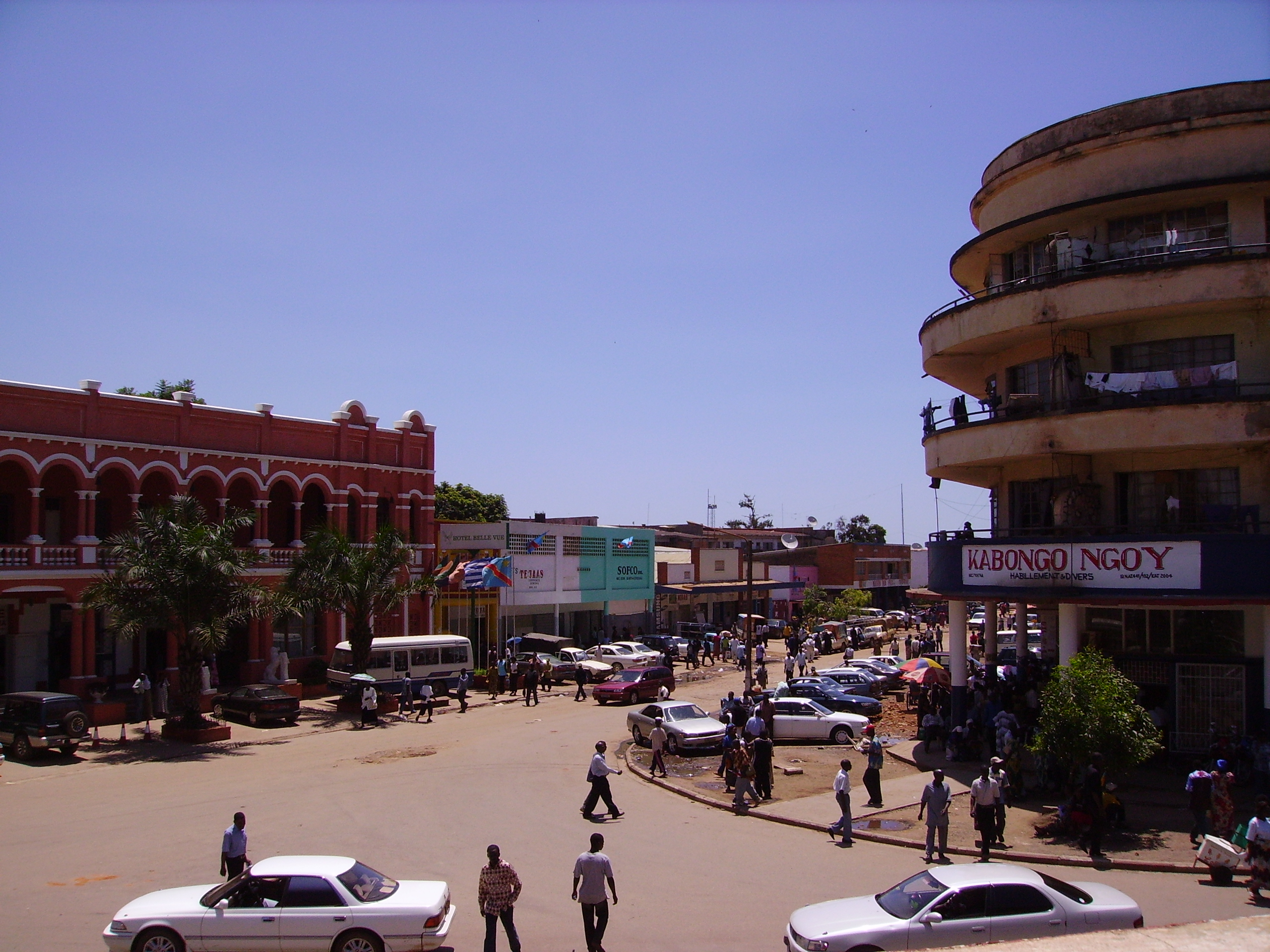
- Downtown Lubumbashi
- Date: 20 November 2012
- Meeting no.: 6,866
- Code: S/RES/2076 (Document)
- Subject: The situation concerning the Democratic Republic of the Congo
- Voting summary: 15 voted for; None voted against; None abstained
- Result: Adopted

Security Council composition
- Permanent members: China; France; Russia; United Kingdom; United States
- Non-permanent members: Azerbaijan; Colombia; Germany; Guatemala; India; Morocco; Pakistan; Portugal; South Africa; Togo

United Nations Security Council Resolution 2076 was unanimously adopted on 20 November 2012. The Security Council demanded the immediate withdrawal of the armed group known as the 23 March Movement (M23) from the major eastern Congolese city of Goma and the cessation of any further advances, calling for a clarification of reports of external support provided to the group and stating its readiness to act on the basis of information received.

== See also ==
- List of United Nations Security Council Resolutions 2001 to 2100
