= United Nations Security Council Resolution 2026 =

UN Security Council Resolution 2026
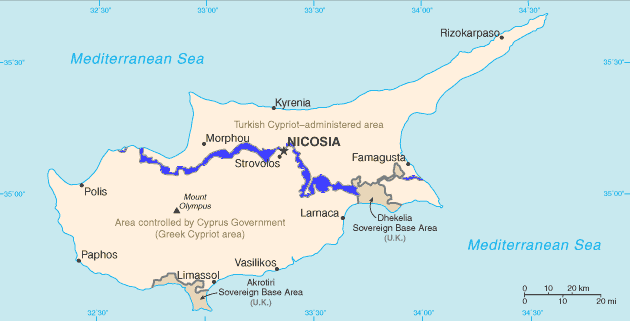
- Buffer zone dividing Cyprus
- Date: 14 December 2011
- Meeting no.: 6,685
- Code: S/RES/2026 (Document)
- Subject: The situation in Cyprus
- Voting summary: 15 voted for; None voted against; None abstained
- Result: Adopted

Security Council composition
- Permanent members: China; France; Russia; United Kingdom; United States
- Non-permanent members: Bosnia–Herzegovina; Brazil; Colombia; Germany; Gabon; India; Lebanon; Nigeria; Portugal; South Africa

United Nations Security Council Resolution 2026 was unanimously adopted on 14 December 2011.

== Resolution ==
Welcoming the encouraging progress made so far in the fully fledged negotiations on Cyprus, as well as the prospect of further decisive progress in the coming months towards a comprehensive and durable settlement resulting from those talks, the Security Council today extended the mandate of the United Nations Peacekeeping Force in Cyprus (UNFICYP) for a further period ending 19 July 2012.

Unanimously adopting resolution 2026 (2011), the Council also called on the two leaders to intensify the momentum of negotiations, constructively and openly engage in the process and work on reaching convergences on the remaining core issues in preparation for their upcoming meeting with the Secretary-General in January 2012.

The Council also called on the leaders to improve the public atmosphere in which the negotiations were proceeding, including focusing public messages on convergences and the way ahead, delivering more constructive and harmonised messages, and increasing civil society’s participation in the process, as appropriate.

It requested the Secretary-General to submit a report on the present resolution’s implementation, including on contingency planning in relation to the settlement, by 1 July 2012 and to keep it updated on events as necessary.

Speaking before action, Council President Vitaly Churkin said the sides maintained their well-known positions on the matter. Thus, with the consent of the Council members, the presidency drew the conclusion that the Council could proceed to take a decision on the draft before it.

The Mission was originally established in 1964 to prevent further fighting between the Greek Cypriot and Turkish Cypriot communities. After the hostilities of 1974, it has supervised the ceasefire lines, maintained a buffer zone, carried out humanitarian activities and supported the Office’s mission of the Secretary-General.

== See also ==
- Cyprus dispute
- List of United Nations Security Council Resolutions 2001 to 2100
- United Nations Buffer Zone in Cyprus
