= United Nations Security Council Resolution 2077 =

UN Security Council Resolution 2077
- Somalia Map
- Date: 21 November 2012
- Meeting no.: 6,867
- Code: S/RES/2077 (Document)
- Subject: The situation in Somalia
- Voting summary: 15 voted for; None voted against; None abstained
- Result: Adopted

Security Council composition
- Permanent members: China; France; Russia; United Kingdom; United States
- Non-permanent members: Azerbaijan; Colombia; Germany; Guatemala; India; Morocco; Pakistan; Portugal; South Africa; Togo

United Nations Security Council Resolution 2077 was unanimously adopted on 21 November 2012. The Security Council renewed for another year the authorizations, first agreed in 2008, for international action to fight the crimes in cooperation with the new Somali Government, whom it requested to create a national legal framework for the effort.

== See also ==
- List of United Nations Security Council Resolutions 2001 to 2100
