= United Nations Security Council Resolution 2015 =

UN Security Council Resolution 2015
- UN emblem
- Date: 24 October 2011
- Meeting no.: 6,635
- Code: S/RES/2015 (Document)
- Subject: The situation in Somalia
- Voting summary: 15 voted for; None voted against; None abstained
- Result: Adopted

Security Council composition
- Permanent members: China; France; Russia; United Kingdom; United States
- Non-permanent members: Bosnia–Herzegovina; Brazil; Colombia; Germany; Gabon; India; Lebanon; Nigeria; Portugal; South Africa

United Nations Security Council Resolution 2015 was unanimously adopted on 24 October 2011.

== Resolution ==
A statement Russian foreign ministry published on its website said: 'the UN Security Council approached through the adoption of this resolution to the establishment of special courts in the region to try pirates international participation. Was assigned to the Secretary General of the United Nations Ban continue together with the UN Office of Drugs and Crime and UN Development Programme consultations with Somalia and the region that would like to establish such courts to combat piracy (above all, Tanzania and Seychelles) on international aid and send the staff of international bodies there, and procedures to deliver the captured pirates, and to the last of that. '

The ministry noted that it is scheduled that the Secretary-General of the United Nations within 90 days after the completion of consultations to the council to propose issues concerning the establishment of such tribunals.

== See also ==
- List of United Nations Security Council Resolutions 2001 to 2100
