= United Nations Security Council Resolution 2025 =

UN Security Council Resolution 2025
- Map of Liberia
- Date: 14 December 2011
- Meeting no.: 6,684
- Code: S/RES/2025 (Document)
- Subject: The situation in Liberia
- Voting summary: 15 voted for; None voted against; None abstained
- Result: Adopted

Security Council composition
- Permanent members: China; France; Russia; United Kingdom; United States
- Non-permanent members: Bosnia–Herzegovina; Brazil; Colombia; Germany; Gabon; India; Lebanon; Nigeria; Portugal; South Africa

United Nations Security Council Resolution 2025 was unanimously adopted on 14 December 2011.

== Resolution ==
The Security Council today, determining that, despite significant progress, the situation in Liberia remained a threat to international peace and security in the region, renewed for 12 months its travel ban on persons deemed to be a threat to the peace in Liberia and arms embargo, modified in previous resolutions to allow the Liberian Government, as well as the United Nations peacekeeping mission in the country, to receive certain military materiel.

Unanimously adopting resolution 2025 (2011) under Chapter VII, the council also extended for one year the mandate of the Panel of Experts, first appointed in 2009 by resolution 1903, which monitors the implementation of the measures.

Through the text, the council, noting with serious concern the lack of progress with regard to the implementation of the financial measures imposed by resolution 1532 (2004), demanded the Government of Liberia make all efforts necessary to fulfil its obligations.

In requesting the panel's reappointment, it tasked it with, among others, conducting two follow-up assessment missions to Liberia and neighbouring States to investigate and compile reports on the implementation, and any violations, of the arms ban and financing sources, such as from natural resources, for the illicit weapons trade; and assisting the sanctions committee in updating the publicly available reasons for listing entries on the travel ban and assets freeze lists.

By a further provision, the Council reaffirmed the need for the United Nations Mission in Liberia (UNMIL) and the United Nations Operation in Côte d'Ivoire (UNOCI) to coordinate their strategies and operations in areas near the Liberian-Côte d'Ivoire border, in order to contribute to subregional security.

== See also ==
- List of United Nations Security Council Resolutions 2001 to 2100
