= United Nations Security Council Resolution 2008 =

UN Security Council Resolution 2008
- Flag of Liberia
- Date: 16 September 2011
- Meeting no.: 6,619
- Code: S/RES/2008 (Document)
- Subject: The situation in Liberia
- Voting summary: 15 voted for; None voted against; None abstained
- Result: Adopted

Security Council composition
- Permanent members: China; France; Russia; United Kingdom; United States
- Non-permanent members: Bosnia–Herzegovina; Brazil; Colombia; Germany; Gabon; India; Lebanon; Nigeria; Portugal; South Africa

United Nations Security Council Resolution 2008 extended the mandate of the United Nations Mission in Liberia (UNMIL) for one year, until 30 September 2011. It was unanimously adopted on 16 September 2011.

== Resolution ==
The resolution was adopted under the Charter's Chapter VII, and reiterated the council's authorization of the Mission to continue to assist the Liberian government with the 2011 general presidential and legislative elections with logistical support, coordination of international assistance and support to Liberian stakeholders.

The Council urged all Liberians to enable free political debate, guarantee unrestricted access to polls, and respect the results. The Council requested the Secretary-General to deploy a technical assessment mission after the inauguration of the elected Government in 2012 to focus on the security transition and develop proposals for changes in the Mission.

Regarding cooperation between UNMIL and the United Nations Operation in Côte d'Ivoire (UNOCI), the Council emphasized the need for the two Missions to coordinate their strategies on border security, armed groups and the influx of Ivorian refugees into Liberia, and asked the Secretary-General to report on that effort.

== See also ==
- List of United Nations Security Council Resolutions 2001 to 2100
