= United Nations Security Council Resolution 2020 =

UN Security Council Resolution 2020
- UN emblem
- Date: 22 November 2011
- Meeting no.: 6,663
- Code: S/RES/2020 (Document)
- Subject: The situation in Somalia
- Voting summary: 15 voted for; None voted against; None abstained
- Result: Adopted

Security Council composition
- Permanent members: China; France; Russia; United Kingdom; United States
- Non-permanent members: Bosnia–Herzegovina; Brazil; Colombia; Germany; Gabon; India; Lebanon; Nigeria; Portugal; South Africa

United Nations Security Council Resolution 2020 was unanimously adopted on 22 November 2011.

== Resolution ==
Unanimously adopting resolution 2020 (2011) today under Chapter VII of the United Nations Charter, the Council stressed the need for the international community to tackle piracy and its underlying causes — including the ongoing instability in Somalia — in a comprehensive response. It noted again with concern that escalating ransom payments and the lack of enforcement of the arms embargo established by resolution 733 (1992) were fuelling the growth of piracy in the area and called upon all States to fully cooperate with the Somalia and Eritrea Monitoring Group regarding possible arms embargo violations.

The Council renewed its call upon States and regional organizations that had the capacity to do so to take part in the fight against piracy by deploying naval vessels, arms and military aircraft, and through seizures and disposition of boats, vessels, arms and other related equipment used in the commission of piracy, or for which there were reasonable grounds for suspecting such use.

In a further provision, the Council called on Member States to assist Somalia, at the request of the Transitional Federal Government, in strengthening capacity in the country, including regional authorities, to bring to justice those involved in piracy who were using Somali territory for planning or undertaking their criminal acts. It called upon all States to cooperate in determining jurisdiction and in the investigation and prosecution of all persons responsible for acts of piracy off the coast of Somalia, as well as to criminalize piracy under their domestic law.

== See also ==
- List of United Nations Security Council Resolutions 2001 to 2100
