= United Nations Security Council Resolution 2005 =

UN Security Council Resolution 2005
- UN emblem
- Date: 14 September 2011
- Meeting no.: 6,611
- Code: S/RES/2005 (Document)
- Subject: The situation in Sierra Leone
- Voting summary: 15 voted for; None voted against; None abstained
- Result: Adopted

Security Council composition
- Permanent members: China; France; Russia; United Kingdom; United States
- Non-permanent members: Bosnia–Herzegovina; Brazil; Colombia; Germany; Gabon; India; Lebanon; Nigeria; Portugal; South Africa

United Nations Security Council Resolution 2005 was unanimously adopted on 14 September 2011.

== Resolution ==
Emphasizing the importance of international support to Sierra Leone during the 2012 elections and its quest for long-term peace, security and development, the Security Council decided this morning to extend the mandate of the United Nations Integrated Peacebuilding Office in that country for one year, until 15 September 2012.

By its unanimous adoption of resolution 2005 (2011), the Council determined that the Office, known as UNIPSIL, should support the Government in achieving peaceful, credible and democratic elections and continue to assist its efforts in conflict prevention and mitigation, and tackling youth unemployment, as well as the implementation of gender programmes and promoting good governance, the rule of law and human rights.

Though the text, it also tasked the Office with assisting the Government in its fight against corruption, illicit drug trafficking and organized crime and in strengthening national capacity in law enforcement, forensics, border management and the building of criminal justice institutions.

In all those efforts, the Council stressed that the Office should work within the Joint Vision of the United Nations country team and in coordination with the Peacebuilding Commission, which selected Sierra Leone as one of the first two countries to receive assistance in recovering from conflict.

The council, through the resolution, also urged the Government to step up its efforts to hold regular and inclusive dialogue on all major political, social and economic issues, calling on the Government, all political parties and other stakeholders to contribute to an atmosphere conducive to fair and peaceful elections.

== See also ==
- List of United Nations Security Council Resolutions 2001 to 2100
