= United Nations Security Council Resolution 2081 =

UN Security Council Resolution 2081
- Date: 17 December 2012
- Meeting no.: 6889
- Code: S/RES/2081 (Document)
- Subject: the International Tribunal for the former Yugoslavia
- Voting summary: 14 voted for; None voted against; 1 abstained
- Result: Adopted

Security Council composition
- Permanent members: China; France; Russia; United Kingdom; United States
- Non-permanent members: Azerbaijan; Colombia; Germany; Guatemala; India; Morocco; Pakistan; Portugal; South Africa; Togo

United Nations Security Council resolution 2081 was adopted in 2012. It extended the terms for several judges on the International Tribunal for the former Yugoslavia so they can complete the case against Yugoslavia. All members voted for the resolution except for Russia who chose to abstain from the vote.

== See also ==
- List of United Nations Security Council Resolutions 2001 to 2100 (2011-2012)
