= United Nations Security Council Resolution 2079 =

UN Security Council Resolution 2079
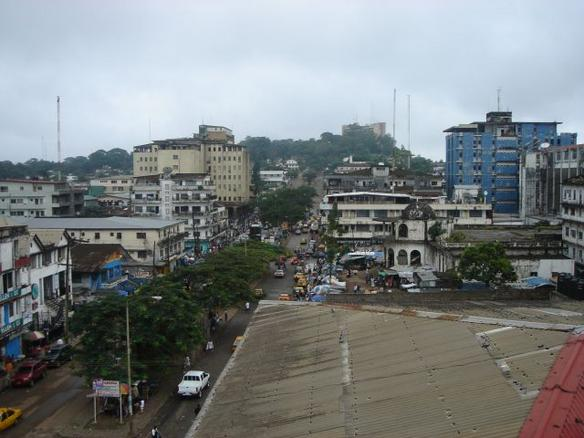
- Broad Street, Monrovia
- Date: 12 December 2012
- Meeting no.: 6,834
- Code: S/RES/2066 (Document)
- Subject: The situation in Liberia
- Voting summary: 15 voted for; None voted against; None abstained
- Result: Adopted

Security Council composition
- Permanent members: China; France; Russia; United Kingdom; United States
- Non-permanent members: Azerbaijan; Colombia; Germany; Guatemala; India; Morocco; Pakistan; Portugal; South Africa; Togo

United Nations Security Council Resolution 2079 was unanimously adopted on 12 December 2012 to extend the UN's mandate in Liberia. This renewed the arms embargo for an additional period of 12 months with regard to all non-governmental entities as well as individuals operating in the territory of Liberia.

== See also ==
- List of United Nations Security Council Resolutions 2001 to 2100
