= United Nations Security Council Resolution 2024 =

UN Security Council Resolution 2024
- UN emblem
- Date: 14 December 2011
- Meeting no.: 6,683
- Code: S/RES/2024 (Document)
- Subject: Reports of the Secretary-General on the Sudan
- Voting summary: 15 voted for; None voted against; None abstained
- Result: Adopted

Security Council composition
- Permanent members: China; France; Russia; United Kingdom; United States
- Non-permanent members: Bosnia–Herzegovina; Brazil; Colombia; Germany; Gabon; India; Lebanon; Nigeria; Portugal; South Africa

United Nations Security Council Resolution 2024 was unanimously adopted on 14 December 2011.

== Resolution ==
Recognizing the urgent need for Sudan and South Sudan to commence the process of border normalization and that the situation in that area constituted a threat to international peace and security, the Security Council today decided to broaden the mandate of the United Nations Interim Security Force for Abyei (UNISFA) to include assistance in that process, including supporting the development of effective bilateral management mechanisms, facilitating liaisons and building mutual trust.

Unanimously adopting resolution 2024 (2011), the Council urged Sudan and South Sudan to implement fully their commitments under the agreements of 29 June, which concerned the creation of a safe demilitarized border zone, and 30 July, dealing with establishment of a Joint Border Verification and Monitoring Mechanism, and urged those Governments to cooperate fully with each other and provide full support to UNISFA, enabling it to implement its mandate.

The Council also called upon all Member States, in particular Sudan and South Sudan, to ensure the free, unhindered and expeditious movement to and from Abyei and through the Safe Demilitarized Zone of all personnel, equipment, provisions, supplies and other goods, including vehicles, aircraft and spare parts, for the Mission’s exclusive and official use. UNISFA will also assist the parties in ensuring observance within the Safe Demilitarized Border Zone of the security commitments agreed upon on 29 June and 30 July.

== See also ==
- List of United Nations Security Council Resolutions 2001 to 2100
