= United Nations Security Council Resolution 2035 =

UN Security Council Resolution 2035
- Flag of Sudan
- Date: 17 February 2012
- Meeting no.: 6,716
- Code: S/RES/2035 (Document)
- Subject: Reports of the Secretary-General on the Sudan
- Voting summary: 15 voted for; None voted against; None abstained
- Result: Adopted

Security Council composition
- Permanent members: China; France; Russia; United Kingdom; United States
- Non-permanent members: Azerbaijan; Colombia; Germany; Guatemala; India; Morocco; Pakistan; Portugal; South Africa; Togo

United Nations Security Council Resolution 2035 was unanimously adopted on 17 February 2012.

Resolution 2035 reaffirms the Council’s commitment to peace, stability, and human rights in Sudan, particularly in Darfur. It endorses the Doha Document for Peace as a basis for inclusive political dialogue and urges all armed groups to cease hostilities and engage in negotiations. The resolution extends the mandate of the Panel of Experts monitoring sanctions and calls on Sudan to lift the state of emergency, allow humanitarian access, and ensure accountability for human rights violations. It expresses concern over ongoing violence, including against civilians and peacekeepers, and warns of potential targeted sanctions against violators. The resolution also emphasizes the importance of international cooperation, including from regional states, to ensure compliance with arms embargoes, travel bans, and asset freezes, and calls for the removal of barriers to the Panel’s operations. The resolution states that the council remains actively engaged in monitoring and promoting peace efforts in the region.

== See also ==
- List of United Nations Security Council Resolutions 2001 to 2100
