= United Nations Security Council Resolution 2006 =

UN Security Council Resolution 2006
- UN emblem
- Date: 14 September 2011
- Meeting no.: 6,612
- Code: S/RES/2006 (Document)
- Subject: International Criminal Tribunal for Rwanda
- Voting summary: 15 voted for; None voted against; None abstained
- Result: Adopted

Security Council composition
- Permanent members: China; France; Russia; United Kingdom; United States
- Non-permanent members: Bosnia–Herzegovina; Brazil; Colombia; Germany; Gabon; India; Lebanon; Nigeria; Portugal; South Africa

United Nations Security Council Resolution 2006 was unanimously adopted on 14 September 2011.

== Resolution ==
Through the unanimous adoption of resolution 2006 (2011), the Council noted that it was countermanding the Tribunal’s Statute by extending Mr. Jallow’s term, which ends on 31 December 2011, for an additional three-year period. It also noted that today’s extension was subjected to an earlier termination by the Security Council upon the completion of the Tribunal’s work.

The current text recalls Council resolution 1966 (2010), which called upon the International Tribunal — charged with prosecution of persons responsible for serious violations of international humanitarian law during the 1994 genocide — to take all possible measures to complete all its remaining work no later than 31 December 2014.

== See also ==
- List of United Nations Security Council Resolutions 2001 to 2100
