= United Nations Security Council Resolution 2040 =

UN Security Council Resolution 2040
- UN flag
- Date: 12 March 2012
- Meeting no.: 6,733
- Code: S/RES/2040 (Document)
- Subject: The situation in Libya
- Voting summary: 15 voted for; None voted against; None abstained
- Result: Adopted

Security Council composition
- Permanent members: China; France; Russia; United Kingdom; United States
- Non-permanent members: Azerbaijan; Colombia; Germany; Guatemala; India; Morocco; Pakistan; Portugal; South Africa; Togo

United Nations Security Council Resolution 2040 was unanimously adopted on 12 March 2012.

== Content ==
The resolution amends a provision related to the enforcement of the arms embargo; extends and modifies the mandate of a slimmed-down Panel of Experts.

== See also ==
- List of United Nations Security Council Resolutions 2001 to 2100
