= United Nations Security Council Resolution 2011 =

UN Security Council Resolution 2011
- UN flag
- Date: 12 October 2011
- Meeting no.: 6,629
- Code: S/RES/2011 (Document)
- Subject: The situation in Afghanistan
- Voting summary: 15 voted for; None voted against; None abstained
- Result: Adopted

Security Council composition
- Permanent members: China; France; Russia; United Kingdom; United States
- Non-permanent members: Bosnia–Herzegovina; Brazil; Colombia; Germany; Gabon; India; Lebanon; Nigeria; Portugal; South Africa

United Nations Security Council Resolution 2011 was unanimously adopted on 12 October 2011.

== Resolution ==
Unanimously adopting resolution 2011 (2011) under Chapter VII of the Charter, the Council called on Member States to continue to contribute personnel, equipment and other resources to ISAF, which is led by the North Atlantic Treaty Organization (NATO), while at the same time strengthening the effectiveness, professionalism and accountability of the Afghan National Army and Police, to which the transition of responsibility for security had started to be transferred in July 2011.

Through the text, the Council welcomed the recent deal between the Government of Afghanistan and the countries contributing to ISAF to “gradually transfer lead security responsibility to the Afghan Government country-wide by the end of 2014”. It also welcomed the Enduring Partnership Declaration agreed upon by NATO and the Afghan Government in November 2010, which involves sustained support for security throughout the transition process and “through the stabilization of the situation in Afghanistan”.

== See also ==
- List of United Nations Security Council Resolutions 2001 to 2100
