= United Nations Security Council Resolution 2080 =

United Nations Security Council resolution on the Rwanda genocide tribunal

UN Security Council Resolution 2080
- Date: 12 December 2012
- Meeting no.: 6885
- Code: S/RES/2080 (Document)
- Subject: International Criminal Tribunal for Rwanda
- Voting summary: 15 voted for; None voted against; None abstained
- Result: Adopted

Security Council composition
- Permanent members: China; France; Russia; United Kingdom; United States
- Non-permanent members: Azerbaijan; Colombia; Germany; Guatemala; India; Morocco; Pakistan; Portugal; South Africa; Togo

United Nations Security Council resolution 2080, adopted in 2012, extended the terms of five judges on the International Criminal Tribunal for Rwanda (ICTR), on the Rwanda genocide. In the resolution, the Security Council also asked for updates on the transition of the ICTR to the International Residual Mechanism for Criminal Tribunals (IRMCT), which was to finish the remaining tasks of the ICTR and a similar tribunal on war crimes and genocide in the Yugoslav wars.

== See also ==
- List of United Nations Security Council Resolutions 2001 to 2100 (2011–2012)
