= United Nations Security Council Resolution 2063 =

UN Security Council Resolution 2063
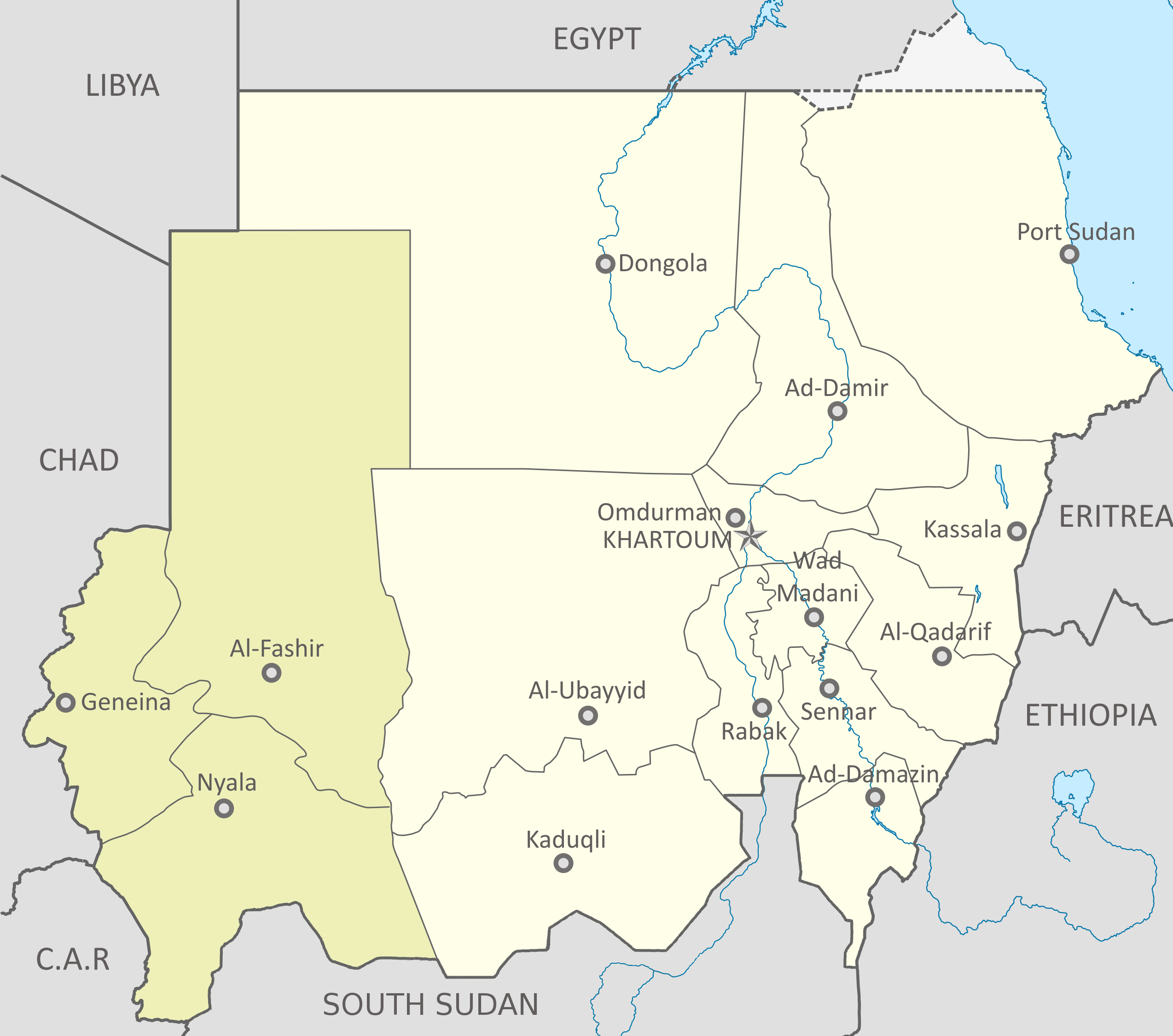
- Map of Darfur
- Date: 31 July 2012
- Meeting no.: 6,819
- Code: S/RES/2063 (Document)
- Subject: Reports of the Secretary-General on the Sudan
- Voting summary: 14 voted for; None voted against; 1 abstained
- Result: Adopted

Security Council composition
- Permanent members: China; France; Russia; United Kingdom; United States
- Non-permanent members: Azerbaijan; Colombia; Germany; Guatemala; India; Morocco; Pakistan; Portugal; South Africa; Togo

United Nations Security Council Resolution 2063 was unanimously adopted on 31 July 2012.

== See also ==
- List of United Nations Security Council Resolutions 2001 to 2100
