= United Nations Security Council Resolution 2062 =

UN Security Council Resolution 2062
- Hotel President in Yamoussoukro
- Date: 26 July 2012
- Meeting no.: 6,817
- Code: S/RES/2062 (Document)
- Subject: The situation in Côte d'Ivoire
- Voting summary: 15 voted for; None voted against; None abstained
- Result: Adopted

Security Council composition
- Permanent members: China; France; Russia; United Kingdom; United States
- Non-permanent members: Azerbaijan; Colombia; Germany; Guatemala; India; Morocco; Pakistan; Portugal; South Africa; Togo

United Nations Security Council Resolution 2062 was unanimously adopted on 26 July 2012. It related to the situation in Côte d'Ivoire and extended the mandate of the United Nations Operation in Côte d’Ivoire (UNOCI) until July 2013.

== See also ==
- List of United Nations Security Council Resolutions 2001 to 2100
