= United Nations Security Council Resolution 2010 =

UN Security Council Resolution 2010
- Flag of Somalia
- Date: 30 September 2011
- Meeting no.: 6,626
- Code: S/RES/2010 (Document)
- Subject: The situation in Somalia
- Voting summary: 15 voted for; None voted against; None abstained
- Result: Adopted

Security Council composition
- Permanent members: China; France; Russia; United Kingdom; United States
- Non-permanent members: Bosnia–Herzegovina; Brazil; Colombia; Germany; Gabon; India; Lebanon; Nigeria; Portugal; South Africa

United Nations Security Council Resolution 2010 was unanimously adopted on 30 September 2011.

== Resolution ==
Unanimously adopting resolution 2010 (2011) under Chapter VII of the United Nations Charter, the Council authorize the Member States of the African Union to maintain the deployment until 31 October 2012 of AMISOM, and also requested the African Union to “urgently increase” the Mission’s force strength to its mandated level of 12,000 uniformed personnel, and expressed its intention to consider the possible need to adjust that level when AMISOM reached its maximum troop strength.

The Council encouraged the United Nations, by other terms of the text, to work with the 53-member African bloc to develop a guard force, within the Mission’s mandated troop level, to provide security, escort and protection services to international personnel, including United Nations staff. It further requested the Secretary-General to continue to provide a logistical support package for AMISOM for a maximum of 12,000 uniformed personnel, including the guard force, comprising equipment and services until 31 October 2012, while ensuring accountability and transparency in the expenditure of United Nations funds.

== See also ==
- List of United Nations Security Council Resolutions 2001 to 2100
