= United Nations Security Council Resolution 2012 =

UN Security Council Resolution 2012
- Flag of Haiti
- Date: 14 October 2011
- Meeting no.: 6,631
- Code: S/RES/2012 (Document)
- Subject: The question concerning Haiti
- Voting summary: 15 voted for; None voted against; None abstained
- Result: Adopted

Security Council composition
- Permanent members: China; France; Russia; United Kingdom; United States
- Non-permanent members: Bosnia–Herzegovina; Brazil; Colombia; Germany; Gabon; India; Lebanon; Nigeria; Portugal; South Africa

United Nations Security Council Resolution 2012 was unanimously adopted on 12 October 2011.

== Resolution ==
Recognizing that the overall security situation in Haiti, while fragile, had improved in the year since a powerful earthquake struck the tiny island nation, the Security Council today extended until 15 October 2012 the mandate of the United Nations Stabilization Mission there and adjusted its force capacities.

Unanimously adopting resolution 2012 (2011) and acting under Chapter VII of the United Nations Charter, the Council decided that the overall force levels of the Mission — known as MINUSTAH — would consist of up to 7,340 troops of all ranks and a police component of up to 3,241, consistent with recommendations in paragraph 50 of the Secretary-General's report on the Mission's work (document S/2011/540).

According to that report, the Secretary-General expresses confidence that a partial drawdown of the Mission's post-earthquake “surge” military and police capabilities would be unlikely to undermine progress made so far on the security front. He, therefore, recommends reducing the Mission's authorized military strength by 1,600 personnel and reducing the authorized police strength by 1,150 formed police unit officers, to be completed by June 2012.

== See also ==
- List of United Nations Security Council Resolutions 2001 to 2100
