= United Nations Security Council Resolution 2019 =

UN Security Council Resolution 2019
- Emblem of EUFOR Althea
- Date: 16 November 2011
- Meeting no.: 6,661
- Code: S/RES/2019 (Document)
- Subject: The situation in Bosnia and Herzegovina
- Voting summary: 15 voted for; None voted against; None abstained
- Result: Adopted

Security Council composition
- Permanent members: China; France; Russia; United Kingdom; United States
- Non-permanent members: Bosnia–Herzegovina; Brazil; Colombia; Germany; Gabon; India; Lebanon; Nigeria; Portugal; South Africa

United Nations Security Council Resolution 2019 was unanimously adopted on 16 November 2011, and approved the mandate of European force in Bosnia and Herzegovina.

== Resolution ==
The council authorized "the member states acting through or in cooperation with the EU to establish for a further period of 12 months, starting from the date of the adoption of this resolution, a multinational stabilization force," said the resolution.

EU Force (EUFOR) Althea, first deployed in 2004, is a military presence in Bosnia and Herzegovina that is responsible for maintaining peace and security in the region and helping to build the capacity of the country's armed forces.

The European mission is also responsible for upholding the Dayton Peace Agreements, which ended inter-ethnic fighting in Bosnia and Herzegovina in 1995 and established the country's independence and a framework for its institutions.

European Union Force Althea is a military deployment in Bosnia and Herzegovina to oversee the military implementation of the Dayton Agreement. It is the successor to the NATO-led peacekeeping missions in the Balkan country—the Stabilization Force (SFOR) and the implementation force (IFOR) in Bosnia and Herzegovina. The transition from SFOR to EUFOR was largely a change of name and commanders: 80 percent of the troops remained in place. It replaced the NATO-led SFOR on December 2, 2004.

== See also ==
- List of United Nations Security Council Resolutions 2001 to 2100
