= United Nations Security Council Resolution 2004 =

UN Security Council Resolution 2004
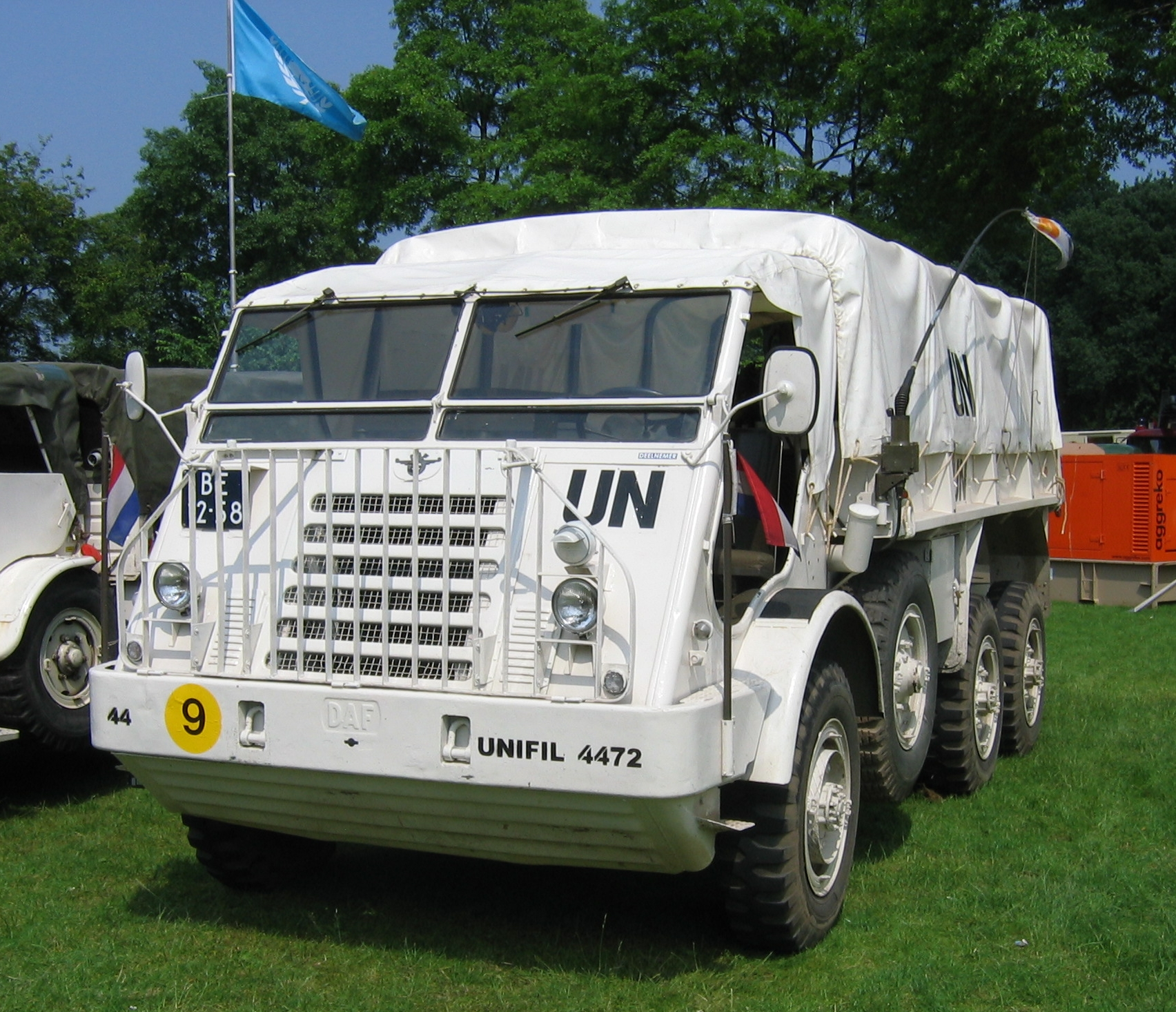
- UNIFIL vehicle
- Date: 30 August 2011
- Meeting no.: 6,605
- Code: S/RES/2004 (Document)
- Subject: The situation in the Middle East
- Voting summary: 15 voted for; None voted against; None abstained
- Result: Adopted

Security Council composition
- Permanent members: China; France; Russia; United Kingdom; United States
- Non-permanent members: Bosnia–Herzegovina; Brazil; Colombia; Germany; Gabon; India; Lebanon; Nigeria; Portugal; South Africa

United Nations Security Council Resolution 2004 was unanimously adopted on 30 August 2011.

== Resolution ==
In the wake of attacks against the United Nations Interim Force in Lebanon (UNIFIL), the Security Council extended its mandate for one year, until 31 August 2012, and condemned all terrorist attacks against it in the strongest terms.

The resolution was unanimously adopted, and the Security Council urged all parties concerned to respect the cessation of hostilities, prevent any violation of the Blue Line and cooperate fully with UNIFIL. The resolution called for the rapid finalization of Lebanon's investigation into the 27 May and 26 July attacks on the Force so as to bring the perpetrators to justice, and urged all parties to abide scrupulously by their obligation to respect the safety of UNIFIL and other United Nations personnel.

Furthermore, the Council urged Israel to expedite the withdrawal of its army from northern Ghajar without further delay, in coordination with UNIFIL. It called for further cooperation between the Force and the Lebanese Armed Forces, particularly in terms of adjacent patrols, and requested the Secretary-General to conduct a strategic review by year's end to ensure UNIFIL was configured most appropriately to fulfil its mandate.

== See also ==
- List of United Nations Security Council Resolutions 2001 to 2100
