= United Nations Security Council Resolution 2034 =

UN Security Council Resolution 2034
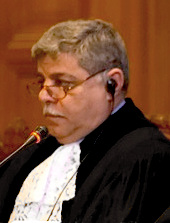
- Awn Shawkat Al-Khasawneh
- Date: 19 January 2012
- Meeting no.: 6,704
- Code: S/RES/2034 (Document)
- Subject: International Court of Justice
- Result: Adopted

Security Council composition
- Permanent members: China; France; Russia; United Kingdom; United States
- Non-permanent members: Azerbaijan; Colombia; Germany; Guatemala; India; Morocco; Pakistan; Portugal; South Africa; Togo

United Nations Security Council Resolution 2034 was unanimously adopted on 19 January 2012. Noting with regret the resignation of Judge of the International Court of Justice Awn Shawkat Al-Khasawneh, the Council decided that, in accordance with the Statute of the Court, elections to fill the vacancy would be held at a session of the Security Council and during the next session of the General Assembly.

Al-Khasawneh, a jurist and former prime minister of Jordan, began serving on the court on February 6, 2000 and served as its vice president between 2006 and 2009.

== See also ==
- List of United Nations Security Council Resolutions 2001 to 2100
