= United Nations Security Council Resolution 2075 =

UN Security Council Resolution 2075
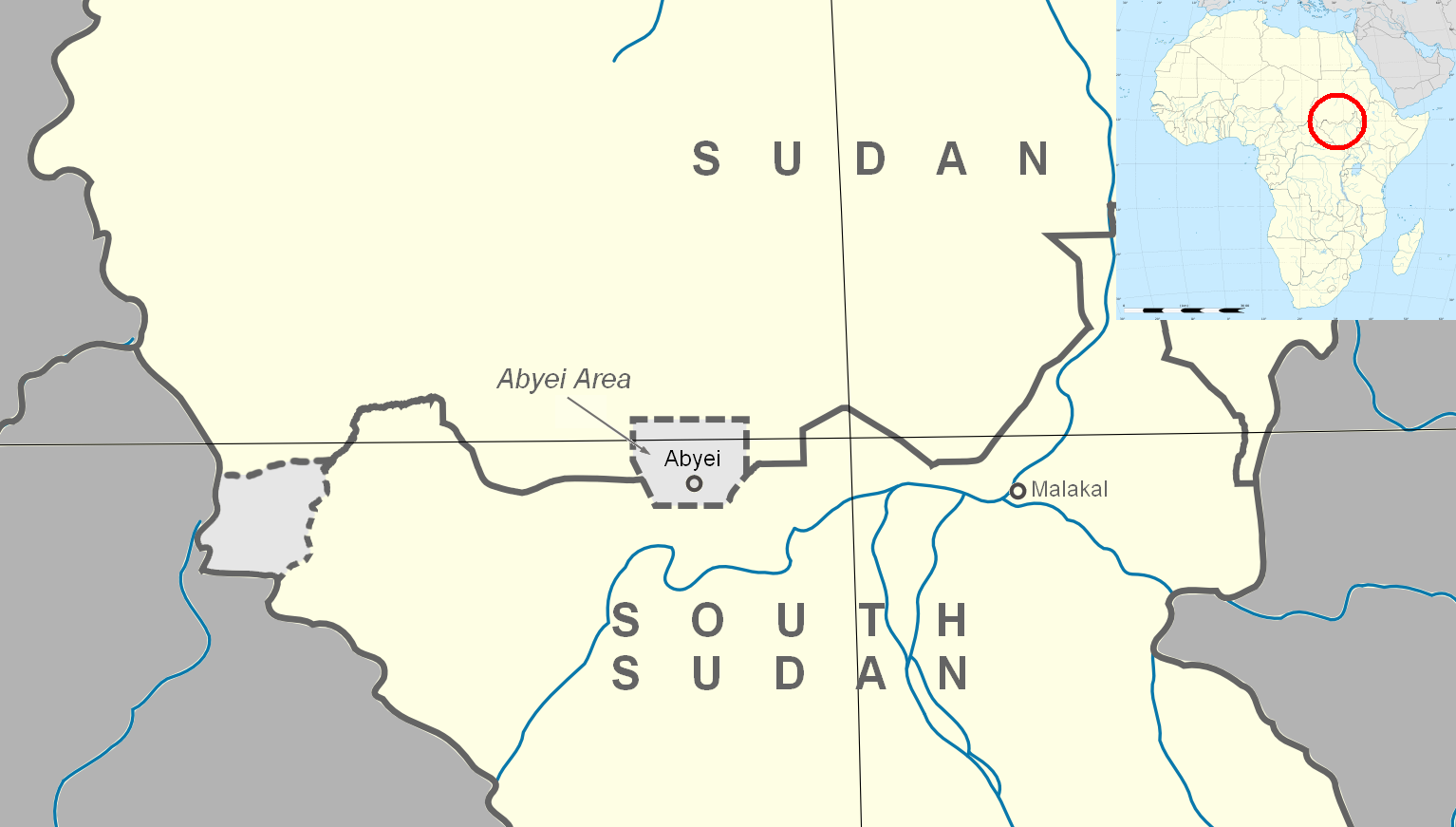
- Map of the Abyei area
- Date: 16 November 2012
- Meeting no.: 6,864
- Code: S/RES/2075 (Document)
- Subject: The situation in Sudan
- Voting summary: 15 voted for; None voted against; None abstained
- Result: Adopted

Security Council composition
- Permanent members: China; France; Russia; United Kingdom; United States
- Non-permanent members: Azerbaijan; Colombia; Germany; Guatemala; India; Morocco; Pakistan; Portugal; South Africa; Togo

United Nations Security Council Resolution 2075 was unanimously adopted on 16 November 2012. The Council demanded that Sudan immediately and unconditionally redeploy the oil police in Diffra from the Abyei area.

== See also ==
- List of United Nations Security Council Resolutions 2001 to 2100
