= United Nations Security Council Resolution 2065 =

UN Security Council Resolution 2065
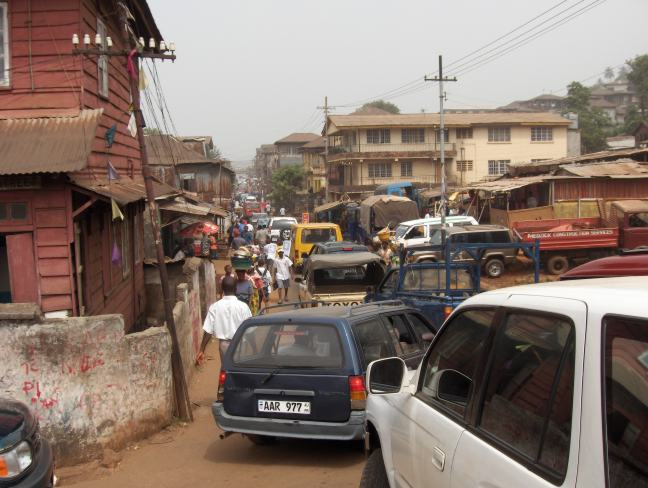
- Street in Freetown
- Date: 12 September 2012
- Meeting no.: 6,831
- Code: S/RES/2065 (Document)
- Subject: The situation in Sierra Leone
- Voting summary: 15 voted for; None voted against; None abstained
- Result: Adopted

Security Council composition
- Permanent members: China; France; Russia; United Kingdom; United States
- Non-permanent members: Azerbaijan; Colombia; Germany; Guatemala; India; Morocco; Pakistan; Portugal; South Africa; Togo

United Nations Security Council Resolution 2065 was unanimously adopted on 12 September 2012.

United Nations official news sources reported: "The Security Council, welcoming the preparations in Sierra Leone for the presidential, parliamentary and local elections on 17 November, and underlining their importance as a “key benchmark” for peace consolidation in the West African country, extended the mandate of the United Nations Integrated Peacebuilding Office in Sierra Leone (UNIPSIL) there until 31 March 2013 to, along with its other key tasks, assist the Government in the run-up to that potentially transformational event.

[The Security Council requested UNIPSIL].. to assist the Government and its electoral, democratic and security institutions in the preparation and conduct of the elections. It also asked UNIPSIL to assist conflict-prevention and mitigation efforts, including through support of inclusive dialogue among political parties, and the Secretary-General to brief it on the conduct and outcome of the elections shortly after their completion."

== See also ==
- List of United Nations Security Council Resolutions 2001 to 2100
