= United Nations Security Council Resolution 2028 =

UN Security Council Resolution 2028
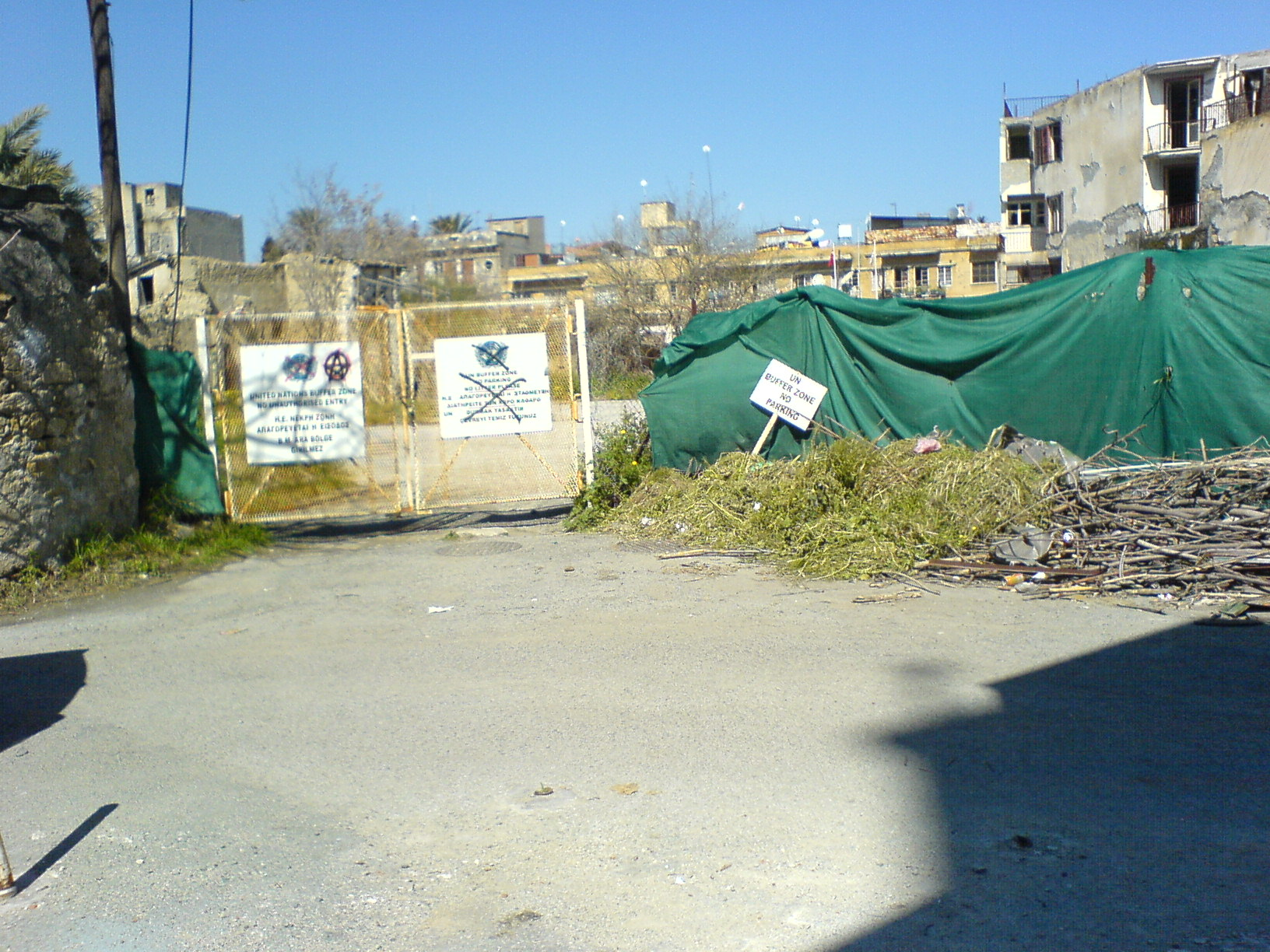
- Buffer zone in Nicosia
- Date: 21 December 2011
- Meeting no.: 6,693
- Code: S/RES/2028 (Document)
- Subject: The situation in the Middle East
- Voting summary: 15 voted for; None voted against; None abstained
- Result: Adopted

Security Council composition
- Permanent members: China; France; Russia; United Kingdom; United States
- Non-permanent members: Bosnia–Herzegovina; Brazil; Colombia; Germany; Gabon; India; Lebanon; Nigeria; Portugal; South Africa

United Nations Security Council Resolution 2028 was unanimously adopted on 21 December 2011 after recalling resolution 338 (1973).

== See also ==
- List of United Nations Security Council Resolutions 2001 to 2100
