= United Nations Security Council Resolution 2095 =

UN Security Council Resolution 2095
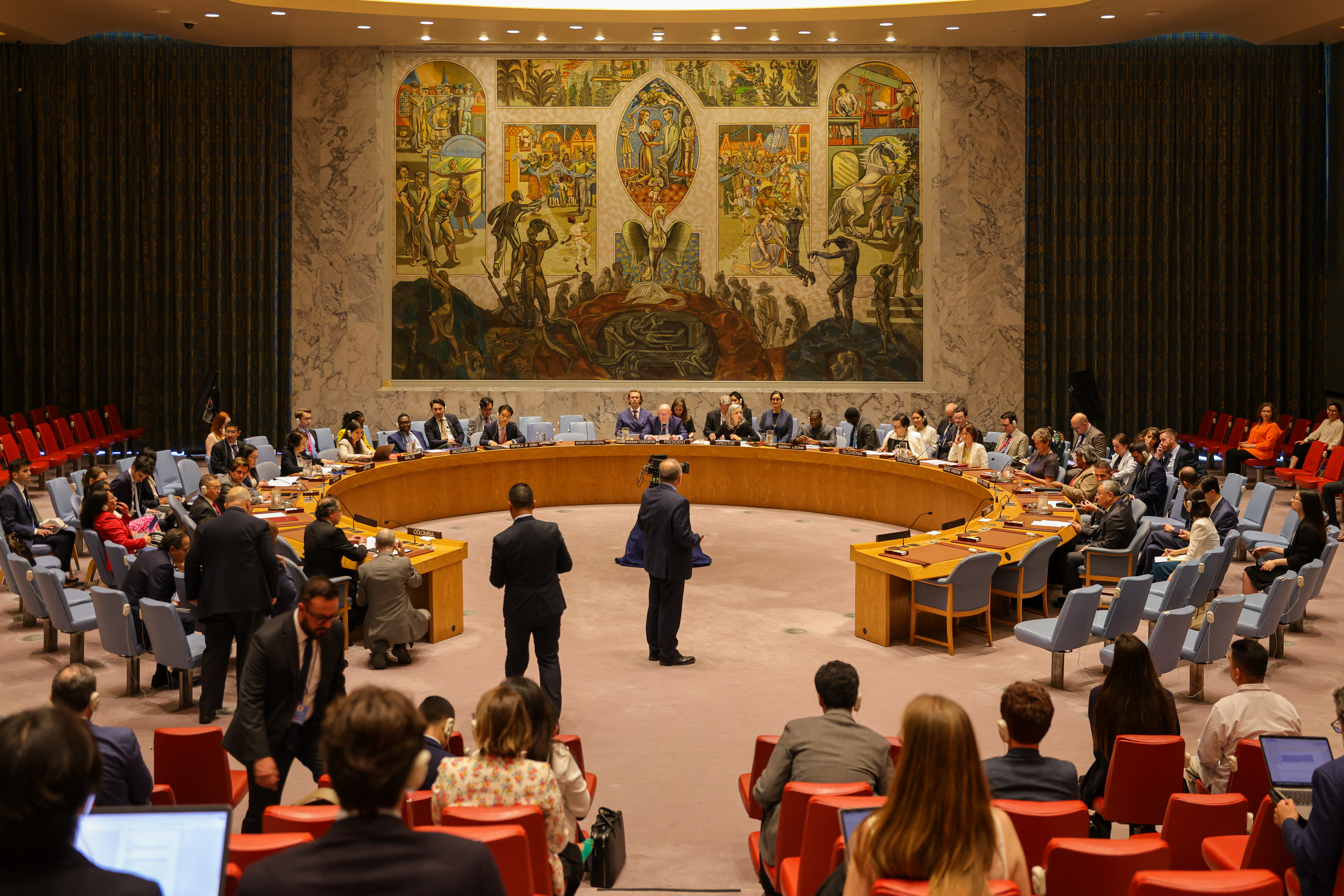
- UN Security Council
- Date: 14 March 2013
- Meeting no.: 6934
- Code: S/RES/2095 (Document)
- Voting summary: 15 voted for; None voted against; None abstained
- Result: Adopted

Security Council composition
- Permanent members: China; France; Russia; United Kingdom; United States
- Non-permanent members: Argentina; Australia; Azerbaijan; Guatemala; South Korea; Luxembourg; Morocco; Pakistan; Rwanda; Togo

United Nations Security Council resolution 2095 was a unanimously adopted Security Resolution passed on March 14, 2013. The resolution extended the UN mission in Libya by one year and amended the arms embargo against that country.

== Background ==
On February 15, 2011, protests in Libya — following other Arab countries — broke out against the autocratic regime of Colonel Muammar al-Qadhafi. Two weeks later, the regime had lost control of much of Libya after violent confrontations between its supporters and opponents. Later he tried to appease the population with money, but the violence continued and many Libyans fled across borders to Egypt and Tunisia. The majority of the international community sided with the opposition in Libya and considered sanctions against the country. The opposition managed, with significant air support from NATO, to conquer almost the entire country. The rebels formed a temporary transitional council to govern Libya. After the death of Gaddafi in October 2011, the insurgents declared Libya liberated and the transition to a new democratic regime began.

Elections were held in October 2012.

== Contents of the Resolution ==
The UNSMIL support mission in Libya was extended for 12 months. This mission guided the transition to a democratic system and assisted in elections and drafting a new constitution.

The arms embargo raised by 1970 against Libya was somewhat relaxed, in the sense that the Sanctions Committee no longer needed to be informed about the supply of military equipment, excluding weapons, to the government, for humanitarian aid or protection. The Libyan government was encouraged to better manage its weapons, including with certificates.

The freezing of bank balances was also extended, as well as the panel of experts that helped the sanctions committee to analyze information from countries and investigate violations.

== See also ==
- List of United Nations Security Council Resolutions 2101 to 2200 (2013–2015)
