= United Nations Security Council Resolution 2013 =

UN Security Council Resolution 2013
- UN emblem
- Date: 14 October 2011
- Meeting no.: 6,632
- Code: S/RES/2013 (Document)
- Subject: International Criminal Tribunal for Rwanda
- Voting summary: 15 voted for; None voted against; None abstained
- Result: Adopted

Security Council composition
- Permanent members: China; France; Russia; United Kingdom; United States
- Non-permanent members: Bosnia–Herzegovina; Brazil; Colombia; Germany; Gabon; India; Lebanon; Nigeria; Portugal; South Africa

United Nations Security Council Resolution 2013 was unanimously adopted on 14 October 2011.

== Resolution ==
The Security Council this morning made a one-time exception to a previous decision by authorizing a judge of the International Criminal Tribunal for Rwanda to perform other judicial work while still engaged with the court.

Through the unanimous adoption of resolution 2013 (2011), the Council said that Judge Bakhtiyar Tuzmukhamedov could work part-time “in another judicial occupation until 31 December 2011, in light of exceptional circumstances”, notwithstanding article 12 bis, paragraph 3, of the Statute of the International Tribunal, which was created to prosecute genocide and other such crimes committed in Rwanda in 1994.

The Council noted Judge Tuzmukhamedov’s commitment to timely delivery of judgement in the two cases in which he is currently involved, urging the Tribunal to take all possible measures to expeditiously complete all its remaining work no later than 31 December 2014 as requested in previous resolutions.

Through the text, the Council also underscored that this exception should not be considered as establishing a precedent, and gave responsibility to the Tribunal’s President to ensure that the arrangement was compatible with the independence and impartiality of the judge, did not give rise to conflicts of interest and did not delay the delivery of judgements.

== See also ==
- List of United Nations Security Council Resolutions 2001 to 2100
