= United Nations Security Council Resolution 2120 =

UN Security Council Resolution 2120
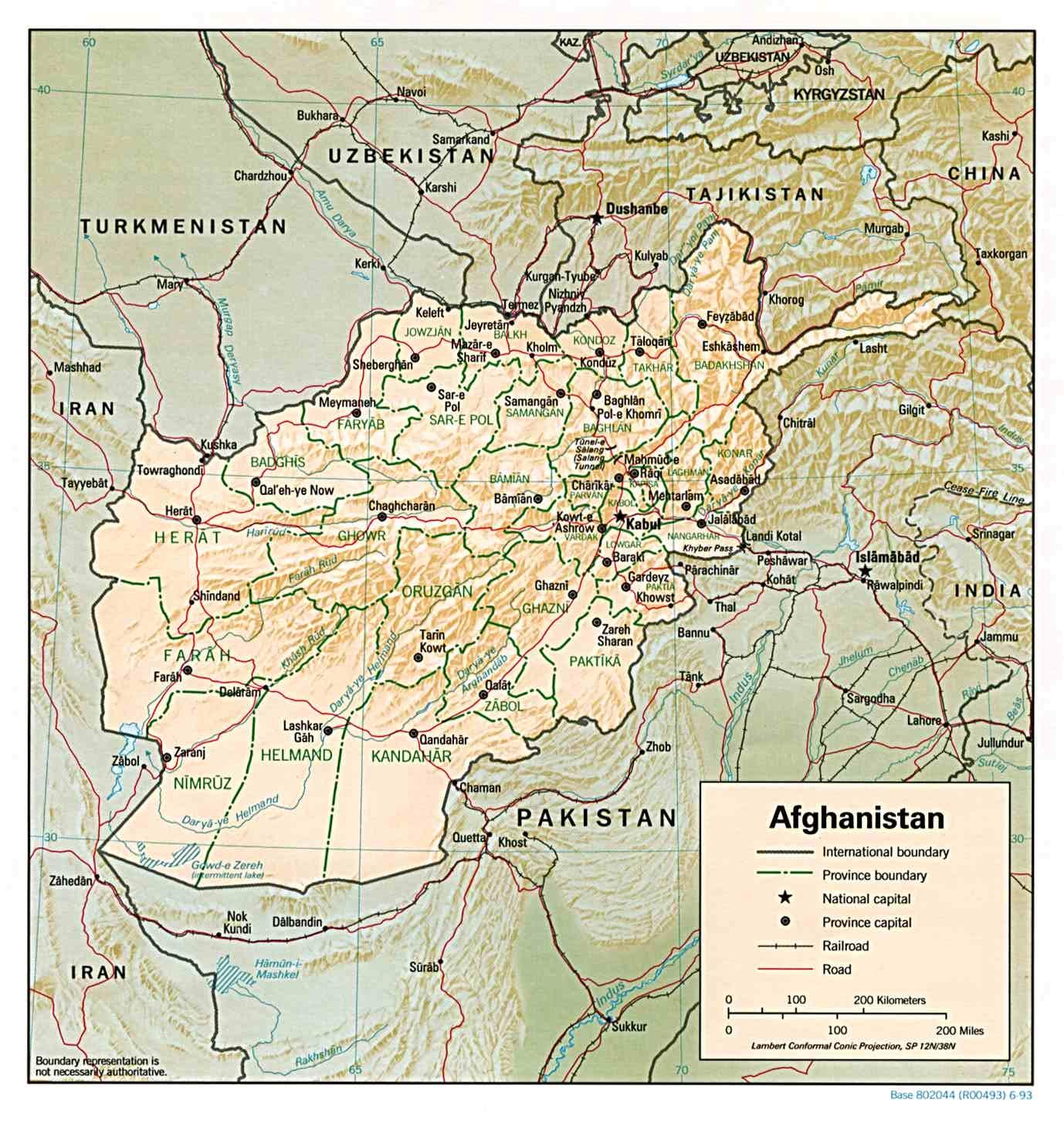
- Map of Afghanistan.
- Date: 10 October 2013
- Meeting no.: 7,041
- Code: S/RES/2021 (Document)
- Subject: The situation in Afghanistan
- Voting summary: 15 voted for; None voted against; None abstained
- Result: Adopted

Security Council composition
- Permanent members: China; France; Russia; United Kingdom; United States
- Non-permanent members: Argentina; Australia; Azerbaijan; Guatemala; South Korea; Luxembourg; Morocco; Pakistan; Rwanda; Togo

United Nations Security Council Resolution 2120 was adopted unanimously on 10 October 2013.

In the resolution the Security Council reaffirmed its previous resolutions on Afghanistan, on the protection of civilians in armed conflict, on women and peace and security and on children and armed conflict, together with its support for international efforts to root out terrorism. The operative part of the resolution extended the mandate of the International Security Assistance Force (ISAF) to stabilize the country under Resolution 1386 until 31 December 2014. The Council also welcomed the agreement between the Government of Afghanistan and the ISAF member countries to transfer full nationwide security responsibility to the Afghan Government by the end of 2014 and resolved to remain actively seized of the matter.

In keeping with the resolution, ISAF's mission concluded in December 2014. ISAF was replaced by Operation Resolute Support, a NATO-led non-combat mission, in January 2015.

== Related resolutions ==
The resolution recalled and reaffirmed a large number of previous Security Council resolutions passed in connection with Afghanistan, against the Taliban and in support of peace: 1265, 1267, 1325, 1373, 1386, 1510, 1612, 1674, 1738, 1820, 1822, 1894, 1882, 1888, 1889, 1904, 1960, 1988, 1989, 1998, 2011, 2041, 2068, 2069, 2082, 2083, 2096, 2096 and 2160. It was later referenced in Resolution 2145.
