= Women, Peace and Security =

United Nations policy framework on women in armed conflict

The Women, Peace and Security Agenda is an international policy agenda established by UN Security Council Resolution 1325 on 31 October 2000, which recognizes how armed conflict disproportionately affects women and girls, and mandates their full and equal participation in conflict resolution and peacebuilding.

== Background ==
United Nations Security Council Resolution 1325 (S/RES/1325), on women, peace, and security (WPS), was adopted unanimously by the UN Security Council on 31 October 2000, after recalling resolutions 1261 (1999), 1265 (1999), 1296 (2000), and 1314 (2000). The resolution acknowledged the disproportionate and unique impact of armed conflict on women and girls. It calls for the adoption of a gender perspective to consider the special needs of women and girls during conflict, repatriation and resettlement, rehabilitation, reintegration, and post-conflict reconstruction.

Resolution 1325 was the first formal and legal document from the Security Council that required parties in a conflict to prevent violations of women's rights, to support women's participation in peace negotiations and in post-conflict reconstruction, and to protect women and girls from wartime sexual violence. It was also the first United Nations Security Council resolution to specifically mention the impact of conflict on women. The resolution has since become an organizing framework for the women, peace, and security agenda, which focuses on advancing the components of Resolution 1325.

In addition to relying on Resolution 1325 as its organizing framework, the WPS agenda is grounded in nine other cross-cutting thematic resolutions of the UN Security Council (1820, 1888, 1889, 1960, 2106, 2122, 2242, 2467, and 2493), and other decisions.

== See also ==
- Youth, Peace, and Security
