= United Nations Security Council Resolution 1919 =

UN Security Council Resolution 1919
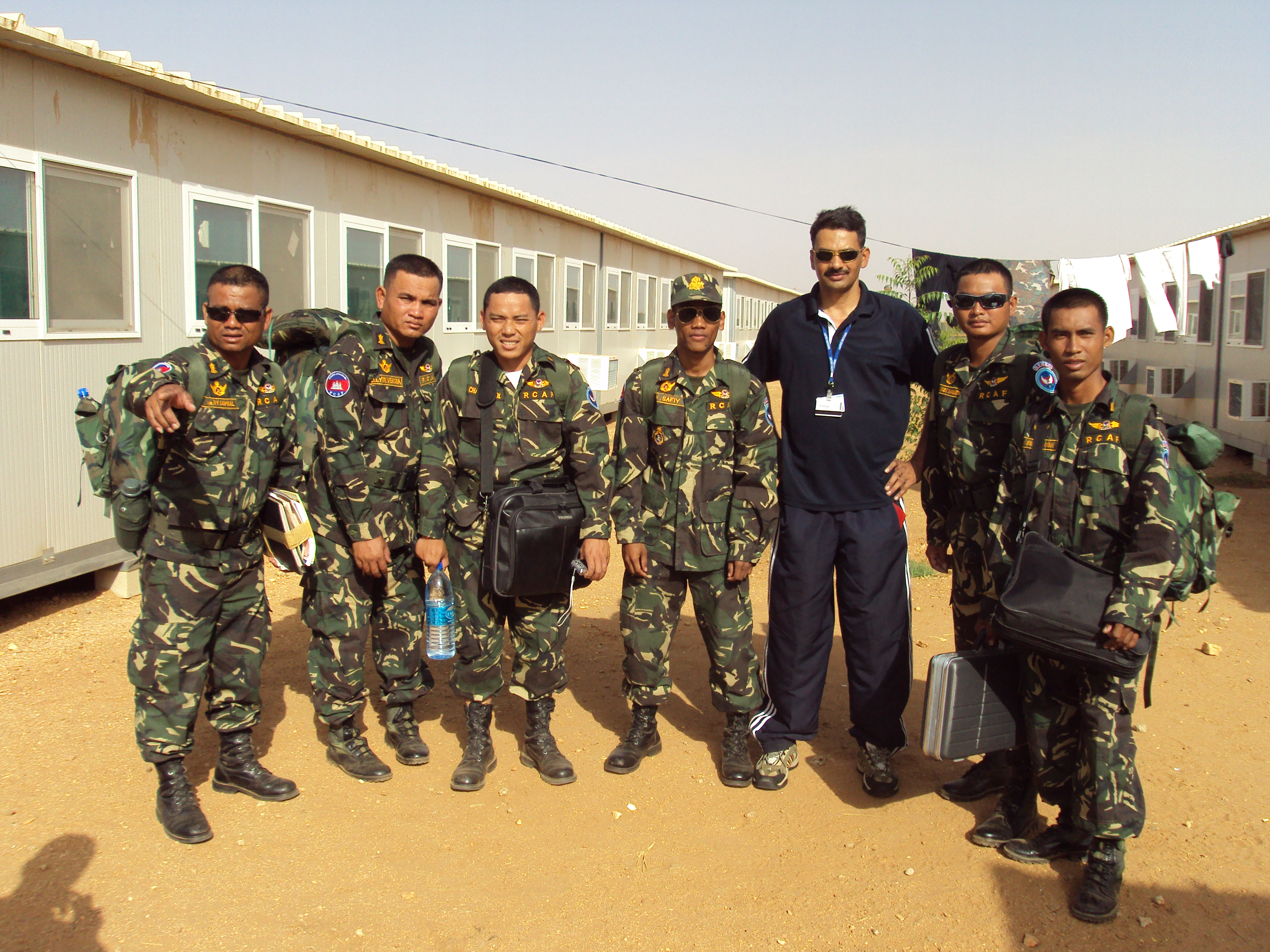
- Cambodian demining unit as part of UNMIS
- Date: 29 April 2010
- Meeting no.: 6,304
- Code: S/RES/1919 (Document)
- Subject: The situation in Sudan
- Voting summary: 15 voted for; None voted against; None abstained
- Result: Adopted

Security Council composition
- Permanent members: China; France; Russia; United Kingdom; United States
- Non-permanent members: Austria; Bosnia–Herzegovina; Brazil; Gabon; Japan; Lebanon; Mexico; Nigeria; Turkey; Uganda

United Nations Security Council Resolution 1919, adopted unanimously on April 29, 2010, after recalling resolutions 1674 (2006), 1894 (2009) on the protection of civilians in armed conflict, 1612 (2005) and 1882 (2009) on children in armed conflict, 1502 (2003) on the protection of humanitarian and United Nations personnel, and 1325 (2000), 1820 (2008), 1888 (2009), and 1889 (2009) on women, peace, and security, the Council extended the mandate of the United Nations Mission in Sudan (UNMIS) until April 30, 2011 with the intention of renewing it further if necessary.

== Observations ==
The Security Council stressed the importance of the full implementation of the 2005 Comprehensive Peace Agreement (CPA), the right to self-determination for the people of South Sudan and the efforts of the United Nations in promoting trust between the two parties. It also noted that presidential and parliamentary elections had taken place in April 2010 in the country. The United Nations, African Union and Assessment and Evaluation Commission would continue to support dialogue between the National Congress government of Sudan and the Sudan People's Liberation Movement in South Sudan regardless of the results of the independence referendum. All acts of violence perpetrated by any party and the effects on the civilian population were condemned. UNMIS and other United Nations Missions in the region were urged to continue to co-operate against threats of local militia and armed groups, not limited to the Lord's Resistance Army as noted in Resolution 1663 (2006).

== Acts ==
After extending UNMIS's mandate until April 30, 2011, the Secretary-General Ban Ki-moon was requested to report every three months to the Council on the implementation of its mandate and of the CPA. Quarterly reports were required detailing work with both parties and post-referendum tasks. The Council deplored persistent localised conflict and violence, particularly in Southern Sudan, underlining the importance of UNMIS in making full use of its authority and capabilities to provide improved security to the civilian population and United Nations or humanitarian personnel under threat of violence. In this regard, it called upon UNMIS to implement a mission-wide civilian protection strategy and tribal conflict-resolution mechanisms, in addition to increasing its presence in areas of high conflict.

Regarding the 2011 referendums, the Council requested that UNMIS be prepared to play a lead role in international efforts to provide assistance to support preparations for the referendums, including an advisory role related to security arrangements. The Secretary-General had expressed concern that there was a lack of progress in preparations for the referendums. UNMIS would also be required to implement the north-south border demarcation concerning the disputed town of Abyei, the resolution of conflicts in Southern Kordofan and Blue Nile states, the creation of referendums and consultation commissions and wealth sharing. There was concern about restrictions placed on the activities of UNMIS in certain areas, and in this respect all parties were urged to co-operate with UNMIS and allow it freedom of movement.

The protection of civilians and humanitarian personnel was emphasised, as a conflict in one area of Sudan would affect conflict in another area. The resolution urged called upon UNMIS and the Government of Sudan to co-operate in the disarmament process and strengthening the capacity of local authorities to deal with nomadic conflict. It was also requested to promote rule of law, participate in the restructuring and training of police and co-operate with the Sudan People's Liberation Army (SPLA) and Sudanese Armed Forces in the disarmament, demobilisation and reintegration process. The SPLA's intention to release all children associated with its forces by the end of 2010, and the return of internally displaced refugees, was welcomed.

Finally, it urged the international community to provide technical and material assistance to Sudan. The Sudanese ambassador to the United Nations said the resolution contained "positive elements" and that the government would work to implement them. The Secretary-General's Special Representative Haile Menkerios said the extension was necessary to monitor "shortcomings" of the election.

== See also ==
- African Union – United Nations Hybrid Operation in Darfur
- List of United Nations Security Council Resolutions 1901 to 2000 (2009–2011)
- War in Darfur
