= Office of the Special Representative of the Secretary-General on Sexual Violence in Conflict =

Office of the United Nations Secretariat

- Emblem of the United Nations
- Incumbent; Pramila Patten since 2017
- United Nations; United Nations Secretariat
- Seat: United Nations Headquarters; New York City, New York, U.S.
- Constituting instrument: United Nations Security Council Resolution 1888
- Inaugural holder: Margot Wallström
- Formation: September 30, 2009; 17 years ago
- Website: www.un.org/sexualviolenceinconflict/

The Office of the Special Representative of the Secretary-General on Sexual Violence in Conflict (OSRSG-SVC) is an office of the United Nations Secretariat tasked with serving the United Nations' spokesperson and political advocate on conflict-related sexual violence, the Special Representative of the Secretary-General on Sexual Violence in Conflict (SRSG-SVC). The Special Representative holds the rank of Under-Secretary-General of the UN and chairs the UN Action Against Sexual Violence in Conflict. The mandate of the SRSG-SVC was established by Security Council Resolution 1888, introduced by Hillary Clinton, and the first Special Representative, Margot Wallström, took office in 2010. The current Special Representative is Pramila Patten of Mauritius, who was appointed by UN Secretary General António Guterres in 2017. The work of the SRSG-SVC is supported by the UN Team of Experts on the Rule of Law/Sexual Violence in Conflict, co-led by the Department of Peacekeeping Operations (DPO), Office of the High Commissioner for Human Rights (OHCHR) and the UN Development Programme (UNDP), also established under Security Council Resolution 1888.

== History and role ==
The mandate was established in 2009 by UN Security Council Resolution 1888, one in a series of resolutions which recognized the detrimental impact that sexual violence in conflict has on communities, and acknowledged that the crime undermines peace and security efforts. The resolution signaled a change in the way the international community views and responds to conflict-related sexual violence. It is no longer seen as an inevitable by-product of war, but rather a crime that is preventable and punishable under international human rights law.

In April 2010, the first Special Representative, Margot Wallström of Sweden took office and in September 2012 Zainab Hawa Bagura of Sierra Leone took over and served until early 2017.

According to the 2025 Report of the Secretary-General on Conflict-Related Sexual Violence, the Office focuses on 21 country situations, including 14 conflict settings, four post-conflict countries and three additional situations of concern.

== Team of Experts ==
The Office's Team of Experts (TOE) on the Rule of Law and Sexual Violence in Conflict works to strengthen the capacity of national rule of law and justice actors to investigate and prosecute for acts of conflict-related sexual violence. The lack of adequate national capacity to deliver justice often leads to widespread impunity and threatens survivors' access to justice, security and safety. The Team of Experts has been operational since 2011 and is the sole Security Council-mandated body tasked with building national capacity to enhance accountability for conflict-related sexual violence. It includes experts from the Department of Peacekeeping Operations (DPO), the Office of the High Commissioner for Human Rights (OHCHR) and the United Nations Development Programme (UNDP), which serve as co-lead entities. In addition, the Team is complemented by a law enforcement expert seconded by the Government of Sweden and a reparations expert. Pursuant to Security Council Resolution 1888 (2009), the Team focuses on: (i) working closely with national legal and judicial officials and other personnel in the relevant governments' civilian and military justice systems to address impunity, including by strengthening national capacity and drawing attention to the full range of justice mechanisms to be considered; (ii) identifying gaps in national response and encouraging a holistic national approach in addressing conflict-related sexual violence, including by enhancing criminal accountability, judicial capacity and responsiveness to victims (such as reparations mechanisms); (iii) making recommendations to coordinate domestic and international efforts and resources to reinforce governments' ability to address conflict-related sexual violence; and (iv) working with other UN mechanisms including UN Missions, Country Teams, and the SRSG-SVC towards the full implementation of resolutions 1820 (2008), 1888 (2009), 1960 (2010), 2106 (2013) and 2331 (2016). The Team of Experts provides assistance to governments, including in the areas of criminal investigation and prosecution; military justice; legislative reform; protection of victims and witnesses; reparations for survivors; and security sector oversight. In support of the Office of the SRSG-SVC, the TOE also serves a catalytic role in implementing joint communiqués and frameworks of cooperation agreed between the SRSG-SVC and national authorities, regional actors and other UN entities, complementing the work of UN country presences.

== UN Action Against Sexual Violence in Conflict (UN Action) ==
UN Action is a cross-UN initiative that unites the work of 26 entities with the goal of ending conflict-related sexual violence. The Chair of UN Action is the Special Representative on Sexual Violence in Conflict, Ms. Pramila Patten. Endorsed by the Secretary-General's Policy Committee in June 2007, it represents a concerted effort by the UN to work as one by amplifying advocacy, improving coordination and accountability and supporting country efforts to prevent conflict-related sexual violence and respond effectively to the needs of survivors.

The 27 entities in the network are:

- Department of Peacekeeping Operations (DPO)
- International Labour Organization (ILO)
- International Organization for Migration (IOM)
- International Trade Centre (ITC)
- Joint United Nations Program of HIV/AIDS (UNAIDS)
- Office for the Coordination of Humanitarian Affairs (OCHA)
- Office of the High Commissioner for Human Rights (OHCHR)
- Office of the Secretary General's Envoy on Youth (OSGEY)
- Office of the Special Representative of the Secretary-General for Children and Armed Conflict (OSRSG/CAAC)
- Office of the Special Representative of the Secretary-General on Violence against Children (OSRSG-VAC)
- UN-Habitat (UN-Habitat)
- United Nations Children's Fund (UNICEF)
- United Nations Counter-Terrorism Committee Executive Directorate (CTED)
- United Nations Department of Global Communications (UNDGC)
- United Nations Department of Political and Peacebuilding Affairs (DPPA)
- United Nations Development Programme (UNDP)
- United Nations Entity for Gender Equality and the Empowerment of Women (UN Women)
- United Nations Environment Programme (UNEP)
- United Nations High Commissioner for Refugees (UNHCR)
- United Nations Institute for Disarmament Research (UNIDIR)
- United Nations Office for Disarmament Affairs (UNODA)
- United Nations Office of Counter-Terrorism (UNOCT)
- United Nations Office on Drugs and Crime (UNODC)
- United Nations Office on Genocide Prevention (OSAPG)
- United Nations Population Fund (UNFPA)
- World Food Programme (WFP)
- World Health Organization (WHO)

== Secretary-General's Report on Conflict-Related Sexual Violence ==
The Office publishes the Report of the Secretary-General on Conflict-Related Sexual Violence annually to highlight a number of new and emerging concerns in relation to the use of sexual violence by parties to armed conflict as a tactic of war and terrorism. The report contains an annex of a list of parties credibly suspected of committing or being responsible for patterns of rape or other forms of sexual violence in situations of armed conflict, the majority of whom are non-state actors. It tracks developments relevant to the implementation of Resolutions 1820 (2008), 1888 (2009) and 1960 (2010) in 21 conflict-affected and post-conflict states and it is compiled through the analysis of data provided by United Nations offices, civil society and regional organizations, as well as Member States. The 2025 Report covers the following countries: Afghanistan, Bosnia and Herzegovina, Central African Republic, Colombia, the Democratic Republic of the Congo (DRC), Ethiopia, Haiti, Iraq, Israel and the State of Palestine, Libya, Mali, Myanmar, Nepal, Nigeria, Somalia, South Sudan, Sri Lanka, Sudan (Darfur), Syrian Arab Republic, Ukraine and Yemen.

In January 2024 the UN’s Special Representative on Sexual Violence in Conflict, Pramila Patten, and her team visited Israel to review claims by the Civil Commission and the Dinah Project and others that extensive sexual violence had taken place on October 7, 2023 and was likely taking place among hostages in Gaza captivity. They issued a mission report on the visit, in which they found " that there are reasonable grounds to believe that conflict-related sexual violence occurred in multiple locations during the 7 October attacks, including rape and gang-rape in at least three locations, namely: the Nova music festival site and its surroundings, Road 232, and Kibbutz Re’im. In most of these incidents, victims first subjected to rape were then killed, and at least two incidents relate to the rape of women’s corpses." The mission team also found evidence similar to those cited in the report of victims found naked, bound and shot, with indications of torture and other cruel treatment. In March 2024 Patten told the Security Council that there was “clear and convincing information that sexual violence, including rape, sexualized torture, and cruel, inhuman and degrading treatment have been committed against hostages” and added there are “reasonable grounds to believe that such violence may still be ongoing against those in captivity.”

== List of Special Representatives on Sexual Violence in Conflict ==
Special Representatives of the Secretary-General on Sexual Violence in Conflict
No	Name	Country	Term
1	Margot Wallström	Sweden	2010–12
2	Zainab Bangura	Sierra Leone	2012–17
3	Pramila Patten	Mauritius	2017–present
