= International humanitarian law =

Law of war to protect non-combatants

International humanitarian law (IHL), also known as jus in bello or the law of armed conflict, is the law applicable in wartime that regulates the conduct of war. It is a branch of international law that seeks to limit the effects of armed conflict by protecting persons who are not participants in hostilities and by restricting and regulating the means and methods of warfare available to combatants. IHL (jus in bello) and jus ad bellum, which pertains to the justification for resorting to war, form the two strands of the law of war governing all aspects of international armed conflicts.

International humanitarian law is inspired by considerations of humanity and the mitigation of human suffering. It comprises a set of rules, which is established by treaty or custom and that seeks to protect persons and property/objects that are or may be affected by armed conflict, and it limits the rights of parties to a conflict to use methods and means of warfare of their choice. Sources of international law include international agreements (the Geneva Conventions), customary international law, general principles of nations, and case law. It defines the conduct and responsibilities of belligerent nations, neutral nations, and individuals engaged in warfare, in relation to each other and to protected persons, usually meaning non-combatants. It is designed to balance humanitarian concerns and military necessity, and subjects warfare to the rule of law by limiting its destructive effect and alleviating human suffering. Serious violations of international humanitarian law are called war crimes.

There is academic debate whether IHL, which is formally constructed as a system that prohibits certain acts, can also facilitate violence against civilians when belligerents argue that their attacks are compliant with IHL.

== History ==
=== Humanitarian norms in history ===
Even in the midst of the carnage of history there have been frequent expressions and invocation of humanitarian norms for the protection of the victims of armed conflicts: the wounded, the sick and the shipwrecked. These date back to ancient times.

In the Old Testament, the King of Israel prevents the slaying of the captured, following the prophet Elisha's admonition to spare enemy prisoners. In answer to a question from the King, Elisha said, "You shall not slay them. Would you slay those whom you have taken captive with your sword and with your bow? Set bread and water before them, that they may eat and drink and go to their master."

In ancient India there are records (the Laws of Manu, for example) describing the types of weapons that should not be used: "When he fights with his foes in battle, let him not strike with weapons concealed (in wood), nor with (such as are) barbed, poisoned, or the points of which are blazing with fire." There is also the command not to strike a eunuch nor the enemy "who folds his hands in supplication ... Nor one who sleeps, nor one who has lost his coat of mail, nor one who is naked, nor one who is disarmed, nor one who looks on without taking part in the fight."

Islamic law states that "non-combatants who did not take part in fighting such as women, children, monks and hermits, the aged, blind, and insane" were not to be molested. The first Caliph, Abu Bakr, proclaimed, "Do not mutilate. Do not kill little children or old men or women. Do not cut off the heads of palm trees or burn them. Do not cut down fruit trees. Do not slaughter livestock except for food." Islamic jurists have held that a prisoner should not be killed, as he "cannot be held responsible for mere acts of belligerency". However, the prohibition against killing non-combatants is not necessarily absolute in Islamic Law. For example, in situations where an "enemy retreats inside fortifications and one-to-one combat is not an option", Islamic jurists have been unanimous as to the permissibility on the use of less discriminating weapons such as mangonels (a weapon for catapulting large stones) if required by military necessity but have differed with respect to the use of fire in such cases.

=== Modern era ===
Fritz Munch sums up historical military practice before 1800: "The essential points seem to be these: In battle and in towns taken by force, combatants and non-combatants were killed and property was destroyed or looted." In the 17th century, the Dutch jurist Hugo Grotius, widely regarded as the founder or father of public international law, wrote that "wars, for the attainment of their objects, it cannot be denied, must employ force and terror as their most proper agents".

The most important antecedent of IHL is the current Armistice Agreement and Regularization of War, signed and ratified in 1820 between the authorities of the then Government of Great Colombia and the Chief of the Expeditionary Forces of the Spanish Crown, in the Venezuelan city of Santa Ana de Trujillo. This treaty was signed under the conflict of Independence, being the first of its kind in the West.

It was not until the second half of the 19th century, however, that a more systematic attempts to limit the savagery of warfare was initiated. This reflected the changing view of warfare by states influenced by the Age of Enlightenment. The purpose of warfare was to overcome the enemy state, which could be done by disabling the enemy combatants. Thus, "the distinction between combatants and civilians, the requirement that wounded and captured enemy combatants must be treated humanely, and that quarter must be given, some of the pillars of modern humanitarian law, all follow from this principle".

==== Hague Conventions ====
In the United States, a German immigrant, Francis Lieber, drew up a code of conduct in 1863, which came to be known as the Lieber Code, for the Union Army during the American Civil War. The Lieber Code included the humane treatment of civilian populations in areas of conflict and forbade the execution of POWs outside of specific conditions.

The Lieber Code subsequently formed the basis for the Hague Conventions of 1899 and 1907, the first multilateral treaties that addressed the conduct of warfare. The conventions defined "the rights and duties of belligerents in the conduct of operations and limits the choice of means in doing harm". In particular, they focused on:

- the definition of combatants;
- rules relating to the means and methods of warfare; and
- the issue of military objectives.

The Hague Conventions were largely superseded by the adoption of Protocol I to the Geneva Conventions in 1977.

==== Pre-WWII Geneva Conventions ====
The involvement during the Crimean War of a number of such individuals as Florence Nightingale and Henry Dunant, a Genevese businessman who had worked with wounded soldiers at the Battle of Solferino, led to more systematic efforts to prevent the suffering of war victims. Dunant wrote a book, which he titled A Memory of Solferino, in which he described the horrors he had witnessed. His reports were so shocking that they led to the founding of the International Committee of the Red Cross (ICRC) in 1863, and the convening of the first ever Geneva Conference in 1864.

The Geneva Conferences served as a forum for the adoption and revision of the Geneva Conventions as outlined below.

- The 1864 conference led to the adoption of the Geneva Convention for the Amelioration of the Condition of the Wounded in Armies in the Field, which was subsequently revised in 1906 and 1929.
- The 1929 conference led to the adoption of the Geneva Convention relative to the Treatment of Prisoners of War.

The Geneva Conventions were directly inspired by the principle of humanity. They addressed the matters relating to those who are not participating in the conflict, as well as to military personnel hors de combat and provided the legal basis for protection and humanitarian assistance carried out by impartial humanitarian organizations such as the ICRC.

The pre-WWII conventions were largely replaced or superseded by the adoption of the Geneva Conventions of 1949, which remain in place today.

== Sources of international humanitarian law ==
Parties to Geneva Conventions and Protocols as at 2025: Parties to GC I–II–III–IV and P I–II–III / Parties to GC I–II–III–IV and P I–II; Parties to GC I–II–III–IV and P I–III / Parties to GC I–II–III–IV and P I; Parties to GC I–II–III–IV and P III / Parties to GC I–II–III–IV and no P

=== Geneva Conventions ===
Following World War II, the Geneva Conventions developed and agreed to between 1864 and 1929 were largely superseded by the adoption of four new Geneva Conventions in 1949, which revised and supplemented the provisions of the preceding treaties. The 1949 Conventions imposed requirements regarding the treatment of combatants and civilians in the field of battle, prisoners of war, and civilians in occupied territories.

The conventions were subsequently supplemented by two additional protocols in 1977, and a third additional protocol in 2005. The 1977 protocols adopted many elements previously included in the Hague Conventions, and established new rules for the protection of civilians in internal armed conflicts that take place within the borders of a single country. The third protocol of 2005 recognised a new protected symbol that could be used for the same purposes as the Red Cross and Red Crescent symbols.

The four original 1949 Geneva Conventions have "achieved universal participation with 194 parties". This means that they apply to almost any international armed conflict. The Additional Protocols, however, have yet to achieve near-universal acceptance, since the United States and several other significant military powers (like Iran, Israel, India and Pakistan) are currently not parties to them.

==== Geneva Conventions of 1949 ====
Progression of Geneva Conventions from 1864 to 1949

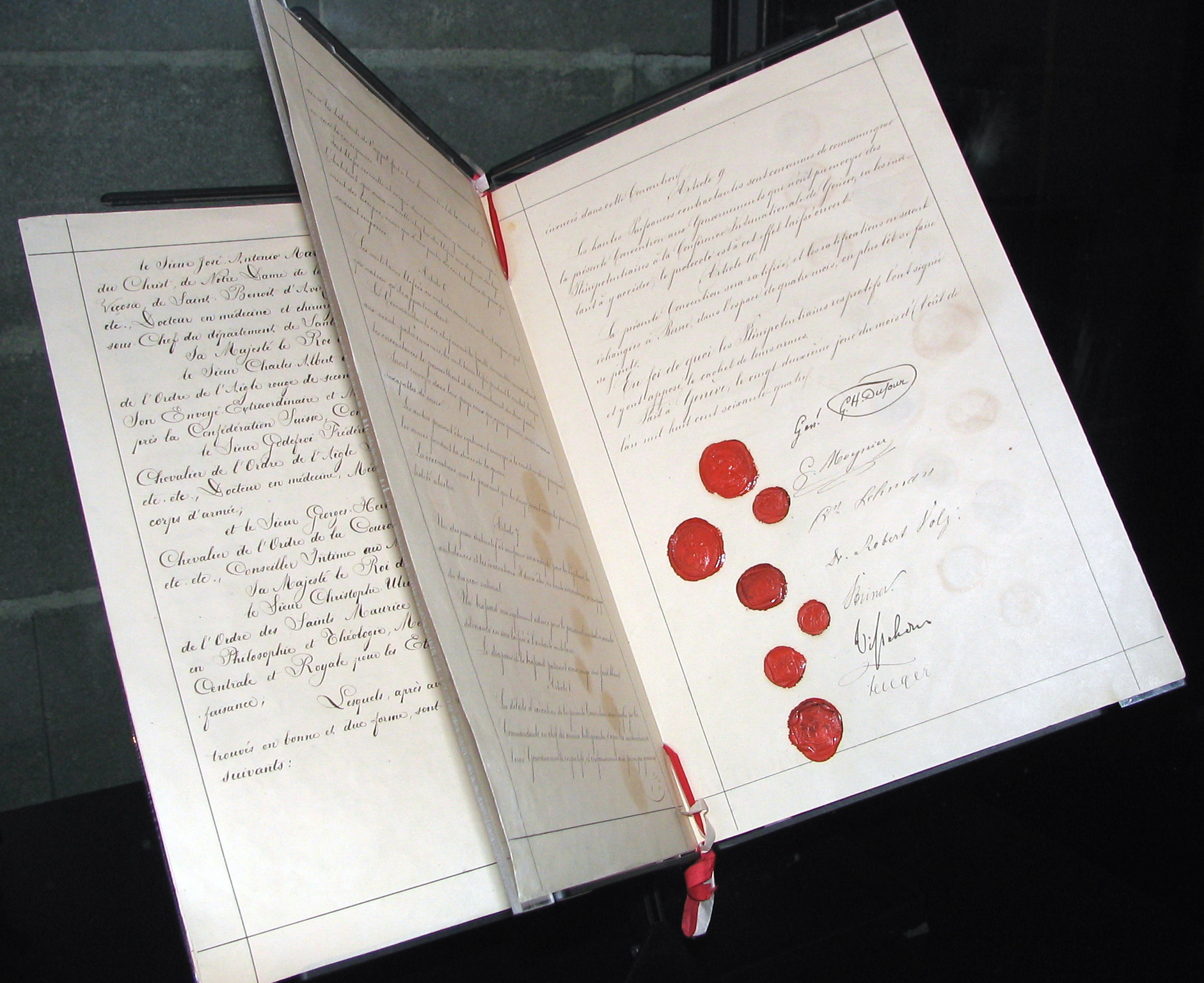
The First Geneva Convention of 1864.

The four Geneva Conventions adopted in 1949 are as follows.

- Geneva Convention I: The Geneva Convention for the Amelioration of the Condition of the Wounded in Armies in the Field defines "the basis on which rest the rules of international law for the protection of the victims of armed conflicts."It is the fourth iteration of the treaty, which was initially adopted in 1864 and subsequently revised and replaced in 1906 and 1929.
- Geneva Convention II: The Geneva Convention for the Amelioration of the Condition of Wounded, Sick and Shipwrecked Members of Armed Forces at Sea adapted the main protective regime of the First Geneva Convention to combat at sea. It is a revision of a prior version adopted in 1906.
- Geneva Convention III: The Geneva Convention relative to the Treatment of Prisoners of War defines humanitarian protections for prisoners of war. It is a revision of a prior version adopted in 1929.
- Geneva Convention IV: The Geneva Convention relative to the Protection of Civilian Persons in Time of War deals with humanitarian protections for civilians during war. It was adopted for the first time in 1949.

==== Additional protocols ====
There are three additional protocols that supplement the provisions of the Geneva Conventions.

- Protocol I (1977): Protocol Additional to the Geneva Conventions of 12 August 1949, and relating to the Protection of Victims of International Armed Conflicts. As of 12 January 2007 it had been ratified by 167 countries.
- Protocol II (1977): Protocol Additional to the Geneva Conventions of 12 August 1949, and relating to the Protection of Victims of Non-International Armed Conflicts. As of 12 January 2007 it had been ratified by 163 countries.
- Protocol III (2005): Protocol Additional to the Geneva Conventions of 12 August 1949, and relating to the Adoption of an Additional Distinctive Emblem. As of June 2007 it had been ratified by seventeen countries and signed but not yet ratified by an additional 68.

=== Specific weapons treaties and subsequent instruments ===
International humanitarian law now includes several treaties that outlaw specific weapons. These conventions were created largely because these weapons cause deaths and injuries long after conflicts have ended. Unexploded land mines have caused up to 7,000 deaths a year; unexploded bombs, particularly from cluster bombs that scatter many small "bomblets", have also killed many. An estimated 98% of the victims are civilian; farmers tilling their fields and children who find these explosives have been common victims. For these reasons, the following conventions have been adopted:

- The Convention on Prohibitions or Restrictions on the Use of Certain Conventional Weapons Which May Be Deemed to Be Excessively Injurious or to Have Indiscriminate Effects (1980), which prohibits weapons that produce non-detectable fragments, restricts (but does not eliminate) the use of mines and booby-traps, prohibits attacking civilians with incendiary weapons, prohibits blinding laser weapons, and requires the warring parties to clear unexploded ordnance at the end of hostilities; (Note: As of December 2012, 109 states have ratified this convention or some of its provisions.)
- The Convention on the Prohibition of the Use, Stockpiling, Production and Transfer of Anti-Personnel Mines and on their Destruction (1997), also called the Ottawa Treaty or the Mine Ban Treaty, which completely bans the stockpiling (except to a limited degree, for training purposes) and use of all anti-personnel land mines; (Note: By late 2012, 160 states had ratified it.)
- The Optional Protocol on the Involvement of Children in Armed Conflict (2000), an amendment to the Convention on the Rights of the Child (1989), which forbids the enlistment of anyone under the age of eighteen for armed conflict; (Note: It has, as of December 2012, been ratified by 150 states.) and
- The Convention on Cluster Munitions (2008), which prohibits the use of bombs that scatter bomblets, many of which do not explode and remain dangerous long after a conflict has ended. (Note: By December 2012, 77 states had ratified it.)

=== Customary international humanitarian law ===
Customary international law consists of unwritten rules which derive from general practice of states accepted as law. Unlike treaty law, which only binds parties to a particular treaty, customary international law is generally binding on all states and so can be drawn on where there are gaps in treaty arrangements. The ICRC has identified two areas where custom international humanitarian law is most relevant. First, where an international humanitarian treaty has not yet been universally ratified but has become accepted as custom; and second, where a subject has not been addressed through treaty, in particular, in cases of where armed conflict takes place between actors within the boundaries of a single state. The ICRC maintains an customary international humanitarian law database that identifies 161 rules across 44 categories.

== Principles of international humanitarian law ==
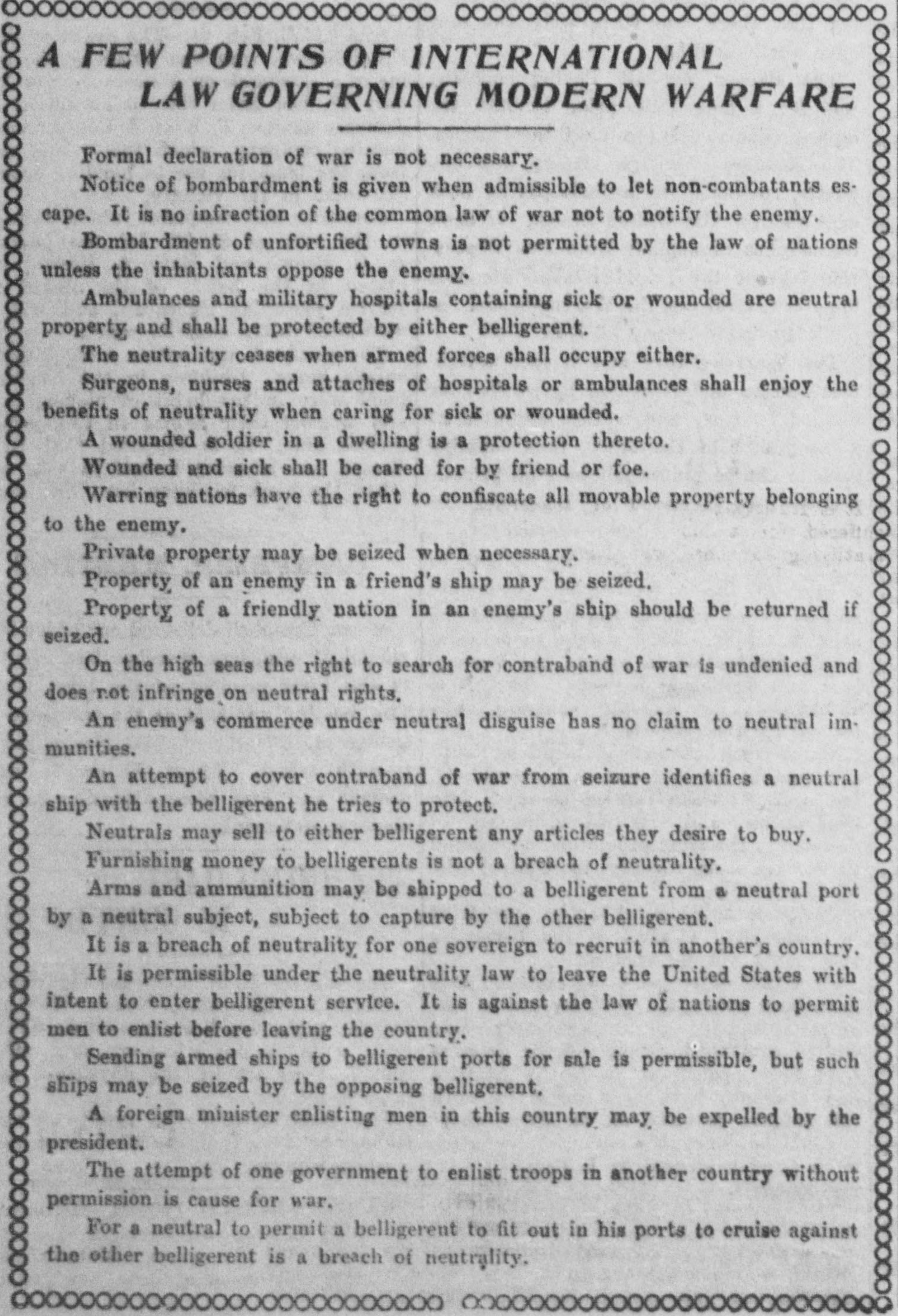
A 1904 article outlining the basic principles of the law of war, as published in the Tacoma Times

=== Principle of humanity ===
The principle of humanity requires that armed conflict respect human dignity and limit devastation in all circumstances. It originates from the Martens Clause in the Second Hague Convention, which stated that "populations and belligerents remain under the protection and empire of the principles of international law, as they result from the usages established between civilized nations, from the laws of humanity and the requirements of the public conscience." Prohibitions against unnecessary suffering to enemy combatants and requirements for human treatment of civilians comes within its scope. The principle, for example, prohibits use of weapons designed to cause unnecessary suffering as well as the use of lawful weapon in a manner that causes unnecessary suffering.

=== Principle of military necessity ===
Military necessity permits a belligerent to use force to compel the submission of an enemy in the most efficient manner possible. However, the application of force and correspondent destruction of life or property must be a military imperative that has a reasonable connection between the application of force and a legitimate military objective. Destruction as an end in itself is a violation of international humanitarian law.

Additional Protocol I provides a widely accepted definition of military objective: "In so far as objects are concerned, military objectives are limited to those objects which by their nature, location, purpose or use make an effective contribution to military action and whose total or partial destruction, capture or neutralization, in the circumstances ruling at the time, offers a definite military advantage.

=== Principle of distinction ===
The principle of distinction protects civilian population and civilian objects from the effects of military operations. It requires parties to an armed conflict to distinguish at all times, and under all circumstances, between combatants and military objectives on the one hand, and civilians and civilian objects on the other; and only to target the former. Attacks shall be directed solely against legitimate military targets. It also provides that civilians lose such protection should they take a direct part in hostilities. The principle of distinction has also been found by the ICRC to be reflected in state practice; it is therefore an established norm of customary international law in both international and non-international armed conflicts.

=== Principle of proportionality ===
Proportionality requires that attacks on military objects must not harm to civilian life or property that is excessive in relation to the direct military advantage anticipated. It also requires belligerents to take everything feasible to assess likely civilian casualties and take precautions to limit them. The principle of proportionality has also been found by the ICRC to form part of customary international law in international and non-international armed conflicts.

=== Principle of non-discrimination ===
The principle of non-discrimination is a core principle of IHL. Adverse distinction based on race, sex, nationality, religious belief or political opinion is prohibited in the treatment of prisoners of war civilians, and persons hors de combat. All protected persons shall be treated with the same consideration by parties to the conflict, without distinction based on race, religion, sex or political opinion. Each and every person affected by armed conflict is entitled to his fundamental rights and guarantees, without discrimination.The prohibition against adverse distinction is also considered by the ICRC to form part of customary international law in international and non-international armed conflict.

== International Committee of the Red Cross ==
The emblem of the International Committee of the Red Cross (French: Comité international de la croix-rouge)

The ICRC is the only institution explicitly named under international humanitarian law as a controlling authority. Its legal status derives from the four Geneva Conventions of 1949, as well as from its own Statutes.

The International Committee of the Red Cross (ICRC) is an impartial, neutral, and independent organization whose exclusively humanitarian mission is to protect the lives and dignity of victims of war and internal violence and to provide them with assistance.

— Mission of ICRC

The ICRC's legal mandate encompasses two lines of work. The first involves providing operational assistance to victims of armed conflict, for example, by visiting prisoners of war and acting as a neutral intermediary between parties to a conflict. The second involves developing and promoting international humanitarian law.

== Scope of application ==
The law of war is binding not only upon states but also upon individuals and, in particular, the members of their armed forces. This includes both state armed forces and, in certain circumstances, non-state armed groups that are parties to an armed conflict.

Parties are bound by the laws of war to the extent that compliance does not interfere with achieving legitimate military goals. However, this does not permit unlimited discretion: belligerents are obliged to make every effort to avoid harming people and property not involved in combat or the war effort, and must comply with the substantive rules of IHL regardless of whether the opposing party does so.

=== Civilians ===
Under the Fourth Geneva Convention and the 1977 Additional Protocols, a "civilian" is defined as "any person not belonging to the armed forces", including non-nationals and refugees. Civilians are protected from direct attack and from the effects of military operations, subject to the principles of distinction and proportionality. Civilians lose this protection should they take a direct part in hostilities.

=== Combatants and lawful combatant status ===
A lawful combatant is entitled to participate directly in hostilities and, if captured, to prisoner of war status under the Third Geneva Convention. Article 4(a)(2) of the Geneva Convention relative to the Treatment of Prisoners of War recognizes Lawful Combatants by the following characteristics:

- (a) That of being commanded by a person responsible for his subordinates;
- (b) That of having a fixed distinctive sign recognizable at a distance;
- (c) That of carrying arms openly; and
- (d) That of conducting their operations in accordance with the laws and customs of war.

There is an exception where armed conflict arises so suddenly that there was no time to organise a resistance, such as in cases of foreign occupation.

Combatants who breach the laws of war lose certain protections and may be held individually accountable. A commander may also be held liable for the improper actions of subordinates if they knew or should have known of those actions and failed to prevent or punish them.

=== Persons hors de combat ===
Persons hors de combat (persons who are out of the fight) include the wounded, sick, shipwrecked, and prisoners of war. They are entitled to protection regardless of which party to the conflict they belong to. Common Article 3 of the Geneva Conventions prohibits violence to life and person (including cruel treatment and torture), the taking of hostages, humiliating and degrading treatment, and execution without regular trial against such persons.

=== Unlawful combatants ===
Combatants who break specific provisions of the laws of war, for example, by fighting without a distinctive sign or carrying arms concealed, may lose their lawful combatant status. At that point, they become unlawful combatants and may lose the protections and status afforded to them as prisoners of war, but only after facing a "competent tribunal". At that point, an unlawful combatant may be interrogated, tried, imprisoned, and even executed for their violation of the laws of war pursuant to the domestic law of their captor. However, they are still entitled to certain protections, including that they be "treated with humanity and, in case of trial, shall not be deprived of the rights of fair and regular trial" because they are still covered by the Fourth Geneva Convention.

=== Spies and terrorists ===
Spies and terrorists occupy a more complex position under IHL. They are protected by the laws of war only if the state holding them is engaged in an armed conflict, and only until they are formally found to be unlawful combatants by a competent tribunal. In practice, they have often have been subjected to torture and execution; the laws of war neither approve nor condemn such acts, which fall outside their scope.

Spies may only be punished following a trial; if captured after rejoining their own army, they must be treated as prisoners of war.

Suspected terrorists who are captured during an armed conflict, without having participated in the hostilities, may be detained only in accordance with the Fourth Geneva Convention, and are entitled to a regular trial. Countries that have signed the UN Convention Against Torture have committed themselves not to use torture on anyone for any reason.

=== Mercenaries and private military contractors ===
The status of mercenaries and private military contractors under IHL is unsettled. Mercenaries are generally not entitled to combatant or prisoner of war status under Protocol I. However, some scholars have argued that private security contractors can appear so similar to state forces that it is unclear if acts of war are being carried out by private or public agents. International law has yet to come to a consensus on this issue.

== Rules of international humanitarian law ==
To fulfill the purposes noted above, the laws of war place substantive limits on the lawful exercise of a belligerent's power. Generally speaking, the laws require that belligerents refrain from employing violence that is not reasonably necessary for military purposes and that belligerents conduct hostilities with regard for the principles of humanity.

However, because the laws of war are based on consensus (as the nature of international law often relies on self-policing by individual states), the content and interpretation of such laws are extensive, contested, and ever-changing.

The following are particular examples of some of the substance of the laws of war, as those laws are interpreted today.

=== Protection of civilians ===
The protection of civilians is a central purpose of IHL. Common Article 3 of the Geneva Conventions provides that persons not taking part in conflict are entitled to respect for their physical and mental integrity, their honour, family rights, religious convictions and practices, and their manners and customs. Protected persons captured by a belligerent must be protected against acts of violence and reprisals. They shall have the right to correspond with their families and to receive relief. Protected persons who are wounded and sick shall be cared for and protected by the party to the conflict which has them in its power.

It is accepted that military operations may cause civilian casualties. However, "[a] crime occurs if there is an intentional attack directed against civilians (principle of distinction) … or an attack is launched on a military objective in the knowledge that the incidental civilian injuries would be clearly excessive in relation to the anticipated military advantage (principle of proportionality)." By the same token, combatants that intentionally use protected people or property as human shields or camouflage are guilty of violations of the laws of war and are responsible for damage to those that should be protected.

The first and second protocols adopted in 1977 extend and strengthen civilian protection in international and non-international armed conflict respectively. Under the protocols:

- Indiscriminate attacks on civilians or materials needed for survival is prohibited.
- Use of weapons that cause unnecessary suffering is prohibited.
- Women must be protected from rape, forced prostitution and from any form of indecent assault.
- Children under the age of fifteen must not be permitted to take part in hostilities; cannot be evacuated to a foreign country by a country other than theirs except temporarily due to a compelling threat to their health and safety; and if orphaned or separated from their families, must be maintained and receive an education.

=== Persons parachuting from an aircraft in distress ===
Modern laws of war, specifically within Protocol I additional to the 1949 Geneva Conventions, prohibits attacking persons parachuting from an aircraft in distress regardless of what territory they are over. Once they land in territory controlled by the enemy, they must be given an opportunity to surrender before being attacked unless it is apparent that they are engaging in a hostile act or attempting to escape. This prohibition does not apply to the dropping of airborne troops, special forces, commandos, spies, saboteurs, liaison officers, and intelligence agents. Thus, such personnel descending by parachutes are legitimate targets and, therefore, may be attacked, even if their aircraft is in distress.

=== Protected symbols: Red Cross, Red Crescent, Red Crystal, and the white flag ===
Modern international humanitarian law establishes strict prohibitions on attacking persons, vehicles, or facilities displaying recognised protective emblems. Under the Geneva Conventions of 1949 and their Additional Protocols of 1977, it is unlawful to attack doctors, medical personnel, ambulances or hospital ships or fixed medical establishments displaying a Red Cross, a Red Crescent, Red Crystal, or other emblem related to the International Red Cross and Red Crescent Movement.

It is similarly prohibited to fire at a person or vehicle bearing a white flag, which indicates an intent to surrender or a desire to communicate.

Persons protected by these symbols are expected to maintain neutrality, and may not engage in warlike acts. Engaging in hostile activities under a protected symbol is itself a violation of the laws of war. Failure to maintain neutrality can result in the loss of protected status, making the individual a lawful target.

=== Use of enemy uniforms and emblems ===
Using an enemy's uniform or emblems to conduct attacks constitutes perfidy and is prohibited under customary IHL and Protocol I to the Geneva Conventions. There is no unanimity as to whether enemy uniforms may be worn for the purposes of approach or withdrawal; however, opening fire while in the guise of the enemy is forbidden. The taking of hostages is similarly prohibited.

== Enforcement and reparations ==
=== Enforcement ===
During conflict, punishment for violating the laws of war may consist of a specific, deliberate and limited violation of the laws of war in reprisal—although it has been argued that reprisals against civilians are illegal under customary international law.

After a conflict has ended, persons who have committed any breach of the laws of war, and especially atrocities, may be held individually accountable for war crimes through process of law. The Third Geneva Convention requires signatories search for, try and punish, anyone who committed or ordered certain "grave breaches" of the laws of war.

=== Reparations ===
Reparation for victims of serious violations of International Humanitarian Law acknowledges the suffering endured by individuals and communities and seeks to provide a form of redress for the harms inflicted upon them. The evolving legal landscape, notably through the mechanisms of international courts like the ICC, has reinforced the notion that victims of war crimes and other serious breaches of International Humanitarian Law have a recognized right to seek reparations. These reparations can take various forms, including restitution, compensation, rehabilitation, satisfaction, and guarantees of non-repetition, aimed at addressing the physical, psychological, and material damage suffered by victims.

== Criticism and debate ==
=== Justifying harm to civilians ===
There is academic debate whether IHL, which is formally constructed as a system that prohibits certain acts, can also facilitate violence against civilians when belligerents argue that their attacks are compliant with IHL. For example, a number of legal scholars have argued that Israel used permissive interpretations of IHL to justify large-scale violence against Palestinian civilians during the Gaza war.

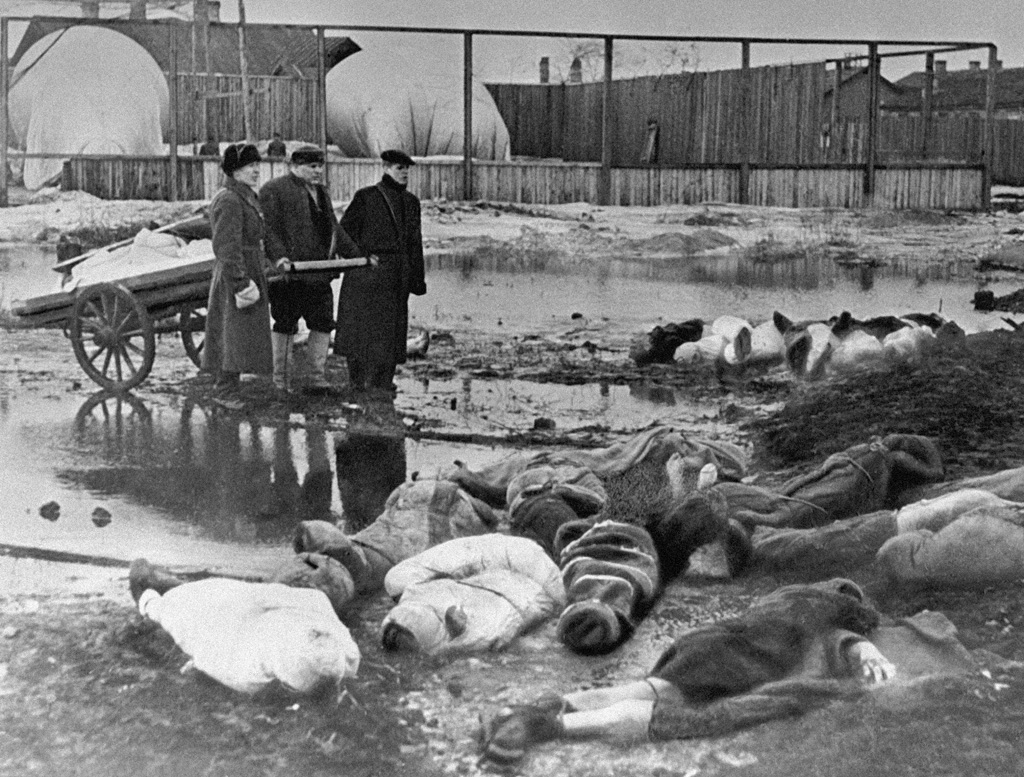
The siege of Leningrad (pictured) killed hundreds of thousands of civilians, but was ruled legal by a United States military court. The 1949 Geneva Convention "accepted the legality of starvation as a weapon of war in principle".

The foreseeable killing of large numbers of citizens could be considered compliant with IHL, which relies on the doctrine of double effect allowing civilian harm as collateral damage of military activity. The effect on civilians is the same as if they are killed in deliberate massacres, and permissive interpretations of IHL move towards the de-civilianization of entire populations through designation as combatants or human shields. Historian A. Dirk Moses suggests that civilian killing in war and genocide could be "a distinction without a difference". To a large degree IHL was created by Western powers to further their own interests, and it has long featured double standards on legally allowed violence. However, it has also been cited by critics of states engaged in colonial violence favoring a more consistent approach to civilian protection.

=== Gendered violence ===
IHL emphasises the concept of formal equality and non-discrimination. Protections should be provided "without any adverse distinction founded on sex". For example, with regard to female prisoners of war, women are required to receive treatment "as favourable as that granted to men". In addition to claims of formal equality, IHL mandates special protections to women, providing female prisoners of war with separate dormitories from men, for example, and prohibiting sexual violence against women.

The reality of women's and men's lived experiences of conflict has highlighted some of the gender limitations of IHL. Feminist critics have challenged IHL's focus on male combatants and its relegation of women to the status of victims, and its granting them legitimacy almost exclusively as child-rearers. A study of the 42 provisions relating to women within the Geneva Conventions and the Additional Protocols found that almost half address women who are expectant or nursing mothers. Others have argued that the issue of sexual violence against men in conflict has not yet received the attention it deserves.

Soft-law instruments have been relied on to supplement the protection of women in armed conflict:

- UN Security Council Resolutions 1888 and 1889 (2009), which aim to enhance the protection of women and children against sexual violations in armed conflict; and
- Resolution 1325, which aims to improve the participation of women in post-conflict peacebuilding.

Read together with other legal mechanisms, in particular the UN Convention on the Elimination of All Forms of Discrimination Against Women (CEDAW), these can enhance interpretation and implementation of IHL.

In addition, international criminal tribunals (like the International Criminal Tribunals for the former Yugoslavia and Rwanda) and mixed tribunals (like the Special Court for Sierra Leone) have contributed to expanding the scope of definitions of sexual violence and rape in conflict. They have effectively prosecuted sexual and gender-based crimes committed during armed conflict. There is now well-established jurisprudence on gender-based crimes. Nonetheless, there remains an urgent need to further develop constructions of gender within international humanitarian law.

=== Cultural relativism ===
IHL has generally not been subject to the same debates and criticisms of "cultural relativism" as have international human rights. Although the modern codification of IHL in the Geneva Conventions and the Additional Protocols is relatively new, and European in name, the core concepts are not new, and laws relating to warfare can be found in all cultures. Indeed, non-Western participants played important roles in the development of this area of law at the global level as early as the 1907 Second Hague Conference, and have continued to do so since.

ICRC studies on the Middle East, Somalia, Latin America, and the Pacific, for example have found that there are traditional and long-standing practices in various cultures that preceded, but are generally consistent with, modern IHL. It is important to respect local and cultural practices that are in line with IHL. Relying on these links and on local practices can help to promote awareness of and adherence to IHL principles among local groups and communities.

Durham cautions that, although traditional practices and IHL legal norms are largely compatible, it is important not to assume perfect alignment. There are areas in which legal norms and cultural practices clash. Violence against women, for example, is frequently legitimized by arguments from culture, and yet is prohibited in IHL and other international law. In such cases, it is important to ensure that IHL is not negatively affected.
