= United Nations Security Council Resolution 1325 =

2000 resolution on the impact of armed conflict on women and girls

UN Security Council Resolution 1325
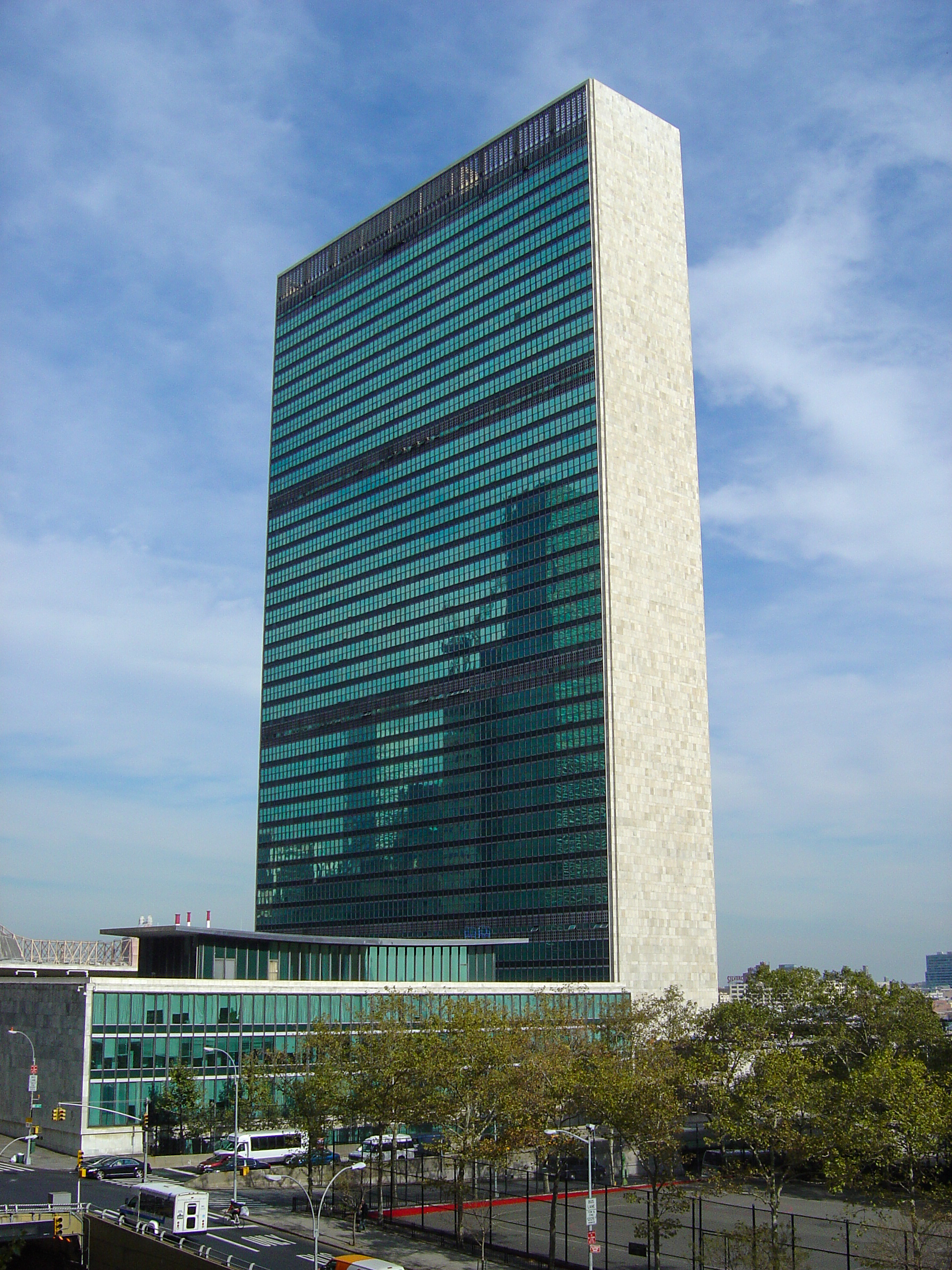
- UN headquarters
- Date: 31 October 2000
- Meeting no.: 4,213
- Code: S/RES/1325 (Document)
- Subject: Women, peace and security
- Voting summary: 15 voted for; None voted against; None abstained
- Result: Adopted

Security Council composition
- Permanent members: China; France; Russia; United Kingdom; United States
- Non-permanent members: Argentina; Bangladesh; Canada; Jamaica; Malaysia; Mali; Namibia; Netherlands; Tunisia; Ukraine

United Nations Security Council Resolution 1325 (S/RES/1325), on women, peace, and security (WPS), was adopted unanimously by the UN Security Council on 31 October 2000, after recalling resolutions 1261 (1999), 1265 (1999), 1296 (2000), and 1314 (2000). The resolution acknowledged the disproportionate and unique impact of armed conflict on women and girls. It calls for the adoption of a gender perspective to consider the special needs of women and girls during conflict, repatriation and resettlement, rehabilitation, reintegration, and post-conflict reconstruction.

Resolution 1325 was the first formal and legal document from the Security Council that required parties in a conflict to prevent violations of women's rights, to support women's participation in peace negotiations and in post-conflict reconstruction, and to protect women and girls from wartime sexual violence. It was also the first United Nations Security Council resolution to specifically mention the impact of conflict on women. The resolution has since become an organizing framework for the women, peace, and security agenda, which focuses on advancing the components of Resolution 1325.

In addition to relying on Resolution 1325 as its organizing framework, the WPS agenda is grounded in nine other cross-cutting thematic resolutions of the UN Security Council (1820, 1888, 1889, 1960, 2106, 2122, 2242, 2467, and 2493), and other decisions.

== Resolution ==
=== Observations ===
The observations highlight how the Council considers the issue of women and armed conflict important to international peace and security. They express the Council's concern about civilians in armed conflict, particularly women and children, who constitute most of the victims of conflict and who are increasingly targeted by armed groups. Attacks against civilians, particularly women and children, negatively impact peace and reconciliation.

More specifically, the observations:

- Reaffirm the important role that women play in conflict prevention, conflict resolution, and peace-building.
- Emphasize the importance of women's equal involvement in peace and security and the need for women's increased participation in conflict prevention and peace-building.
- Reaffirm the importance of international humanitarian and human rights law in the protection of women and their rights.
- Recognize the need to adopt a gender perspective in peacekeeping operations and training of peacekeeping personnel on the special needs of women and children in conflict and humanitarian settings.
- Recognizes that the protection of women and girls and their participation in peace processes is important to international peace and security.

=== Acts ===
The operational items in Resolution 1325 broadly call upon member states to address the needs of women and girls in armed conflict and support their participation in peace negotiations. The key components and recommendations of the resolution are:

- Preventing sexual and gender-based violence in armed conflict: Resolution 1325 calls upon all parties to conflict to take special measures to protect women and girls from violence in armed conflict, particularly sexual and gender-based violence. It also calls for states to end impunity for crimes against humanity, particularly sexual violence, and prosecute offenders.
- Peace negotiations: The resolution calls for including a gender perspective in peace negotiations and increasing women's participation in peace negotiation, with particular attention to supporting local women's peace initiatives.
- Protection of women and girls in refugee settings: The resolution calls upon parties to conflict to consider the special needs of women in girls in designing and administering refugee camps.
- Disarmament, demobilization and reintegration (DDR): It also calls for considering gender in DDR, particularly the different needs of male and female ex-combatants.
- Women's political participation: The resolution calls upon member states to increase women's participation at all levels of decision-making in national, regional, and international institutions.
- Incorporate a gender perspective into peacekeeping operations, consider gender in Security Council missions, and consult with international and local women's organizations.
- Provide training for the UN and member states on the protection, rights, and needs of women; gender sensitivity; and the importance of involving women in peacekeeping and peace-building measures.
- Gender balancing in the UN: Increase women's representation as Special Representatives and envoys, and in field operations, particularly among military observers, police, and human rights and humanitarian personnel.
- Reporting: The resolution requests that the UN Secretary-General conduct a study on the impact of armed conflict on women and girls, the role of women in peace-building, the gender dimensions of peace processes and conflict resolution, and on gender mainstreaming in UN peacekeeping missions. It also invites the Secretary-General to report the findings of these studies to the Security Council.

The resolution also calls upon all countries to fully respect international law applicable to the rights and protection of women and girls, in particular the obligation under the Geneva Convention of 1949 and Additional Protocol thereto of 1977, the 1951 Refugee Convention and the Protocol thereto of 1967, the Convention on the Elimination of All Forms of Discrimination Against Women (CEDAW) and its Optional Protocol, and the Convention on the Rights of the Child and both its Optional Protocol on the Involvement of Children in Armed Conflict and its Optional Protocol on the Sale of Children, Child Prostitution and Child Pornography, and finally to bear in mind the provisions of the Rome Statute of the International Criminal Court.

== History ==
The resolution was passed unanimously in October 2000 after extensive lobbying by the NGO Working Group on Women, Peace and Security (NGO WG) and United Nations Development Fund for Women (UNIFEM; now succeeded by UN Women). Netumbo Nandi-Ndaitwah, then Minister of Women's Affairs in Namibia, initiated the resolution when the country took its turn chairing the Security Council. Ambassador Anwarul Chowdhury, representing Bangladesh at the Council, also made significant contributions by using Bangladesh's role as Council President to bring attention to women's contributions to peace and security. Chowdhury has remained a vocal and active advocate for full implementation of Resolution 1325. The NGO Working Group played a critical role in successfully lobbying the Council to hold open sessions on women, peace, and security, consulting with Council members on the resolution, and providing them with applicable information.

The 1995 Beijing Platform for Action contained an entire chapter focused on women, peace, and security. During the 1990s, the NGO community was increasingly concerned about the negative impacts of war on women, particularly widespread sexual violence seen in civil wars in Bosnia, West Africa, and Rwanda. Activists were also upset that women faced significant barriers to entering peace talks and the negative impacts that women experienced post-conflict. The Beijing Conference's 5th anniversary (Beijing+5) provided critical momentum for progress on women, peace, and security issues at the UN.

The resolution's history and passage is notable for the level of involvement by NGOs and civil society, who helped draft the resolution. The two-day debate on the resolution was also the first time the Council dedicated a discussion to women.

== Implementation ==
=== United Nations ===
The two main components of Resolution 1325 are addressing sexual violence in armed conflict and increasing women's participation in peace processes and political institutions. Within the United Nations, the resolution has led to an increased attention to gender mainstreaming, or assessing a policy's different impacts for women and men. The main programs implementing the resolution are UN Women and the Department of Peacekeeping Operations, although many other programs also apply it to their work.

==== Four pillars of implementation ====
In 2009, Resolution 1889 called on the Secretary-General to develop a set of indicators to track the implementation of Resolution 1325. The indicators are used for UN programming, but have also been adopted by member states and NGOs. The indicators developed are the four pillars of prevention, protection, participation, and relief and recovery.

- Prevention focuses on preventing sexual and gender-based violence, as well as gender awareness in conflict prevention and early warning systems. This includes preventing sexual exploitation and abuse by peacekeeping forces.
- Protection involves improving women and girls' safety, physical and mental health, economic security, and overall well-being. It also focuses on improving the rights of women and girls and their legal protections.
- Participation refers to promoting women's participation in peace processes, increasing the numbers of women at all levels of decision-making institutions, and increasing partnerships with local women's organizations. Participation also includes increasing women's participation in the UN in senior positions, as Special Representatives and in peacekeeping missions and operations.
- Relief and recovery efforts should ensure the equal distribution of aid to women and girls and incorporate gender perspectives into relief and recovery efforts.

Specific indicators include tracking numbers related to outcomes, such as the number of women in peace negotiations, the number of military manuals that include measures on women's protection, or the number of cases investigated on violence against women.

=== National Action Plans ===
World map showing the status of NAPs in 2024

Two years after Resolution 1325 launched, the Security Council began encouraging the development of National Action Plans (NAPs) as a tool that member states could use to detail steps that they will take to fulfill the resolution's objectives. In September 2016, 63 countries had adopted such plans. Nine years later, in September 2025, that number had risen to 108 countries. NAPs address political, social, and human security policies and often require interagency coordination. Many donor country NAPs tend to be externally focused, outlining and documenting their commitments to promoting Resolution 1325's principles in focal countries; developing and conflict-affected countries generally use NAPs to support women's internal participation in politics and peace processes, as well as outline internal commitments on protection from sexual and gender-based violence. Currently, Europe (27) and Africa (19) are the regions with the highest number of National Action Plans. While the number of NAP countries rapidly increased in the lead up to both the 10th (in 2010) and 15th (in 2015) anniversaries of Resolution 1325, only 32% of UN member states have implemented NAPs in 2016, and 101 countries as of early 2024. A major gap is in troop contributing countries (TCC) and police contributing countries (PCC) to peacekeeping missions—the top four countries providing police, military experts, and troops do not yet have national action plans.

==== Challenges to implementation ====
In order to hold implementers accountable, Resolution 1325 NAPs ought to contain a monitoring and evaluation framework that outlines specific progress indicators and assigns clear roles and responsibilities for monitoring and reporting activities. Also, few NAPs have actual allocated funding for development or implementation: a 2014 survey of NAPs revealed that funding most commonly went to addressing sexual and gender-based violence and increasing women's involvement in peace processes, while the most common funding gap was security sector reform and access to justice.

==== Local Action Plans and Regional Action Plans ====
Local Action Plans (LAPs) are a way to operationalize the resolution at the local and community levels. Countries such as Serbia, Sierra Leone, and the Philippines have implemented local level mechanisms for implementing the resolution and NAPs. Several regional organizations have adopted Regional Action Plans (RAPs), including the European Union, North Atlantic Treaty Organization (NATO), Economic Community of West African States (ECOWAS), and the Pacific Islands Forum. RAPs coordinate regional priorities on women, peace, and security and help direct and prioritize regional organizations' programming and funding on the topic. NATO has used Resolution 1325 to increase the levels of women in the military and has influenced seven NATO member states to have increasing women's participation in the military as a goal in implementing the resolution.

=== Non-governmental organizations ===
NGOs play an important role in implementing Resolution 1325. NGOs have lobbied their national governments to develop National Action Plans and many NAPs have a NGO oversight body to hold governments accountable to their commitments. Grassroots NGOs, particularly women's organizations, also use UNSCR 1325 in conflict-affected countries to lobby their governments to comply with the resolution on the issues of including women in conflict negotiations or holding peacekeeping missions accountable for sexual abuse and exploitation. Established international NGOs play an important role in disseminating information on the resolution to grassroots organizations and training local actors on the resolution and how to use it.

== Impact ==
=== Recognition and scope ===
Resolution 1325 is used around the world as a policy tool to implement gender-sensitive conflict-related policies. It is also used as an organizing framework for actors outside of the United Nations, such as states, NGOs, and researchers, in a way that no other Security Council resolution has been used. For example, it is the only resolution to have its anniversary celebrated with reports, conferences, and special sessions of the Security Council, as well as the only resolution with NGOs dedicated to its implementation. Since 2000, women, peace, and security has become an important topic in international politics, undoubtedly fueled by the resolution's passage and subsequent advocacy for its implementation, as well as increased attention to sexual violence in armed conflict. Another major landmark was the 2011 Nobel Peace Prize, awarded to Ellen Johnson Sirleaf, Leymah Gbowee, and Tawakkol Karman "for their non-violent struggle for the safety of women and for women's rights to full participation in peace-building work". As the topic of women and war became more prominent, more policy-making bodies turned to the resolution and supported it.

Within the UN, the resolution precipitated increased attention to the issue of women and conflict. Prior to Resolution 1325, the Security Council rarely considered women apart from the occasional passing reference to women and children as vulnerable groups in conflict in need of protection. Since its passage, the Security Council has passed six more resolutions related to the topic of women and armed conflict. Furthermore, there has been a significant change in rhetoric, with more and more UN agencies, representatives, and member states discussing how gender inequality impacts peace and security. However, it has been suggested that these changes have been limited, with only 33 out of 225 Security Council resolutions passed in the three years after the passage of Resolution 1325 mentioning the words "gender" or "women".

=== Outcomes ===
Assessments of Resolution 1325 include annual Secretary-General reports in 2013 and 2014 and a conducted ten-year review of Resolution 1325 implementation conducted by the Department of Peacekeeping Operations looking at twelve UN peacekeeping missions and reported outcomes across the components of the resolution. Findings include:

- Women's political participation has had largely positive outcomes, with host countries seeing higher rates of female voters and politicians, as well as increased legal provisions to support gender equality.
- There continued to be low levels of women in peace negotiations, with women comprising less than 10% of those formally involved across all missions.
  - Academic research found that women were significantly more likely to be mentioned in peace processes and agreements after Resolution 1325.
  - The majority of UN-supported peace processes in 2011–2013 held regular consultations with women's organizations, and, in 2012 and 2013, all UN support teams included women.
- Security sector institutions saw limited gains in female uniformed personnel, despite increases in the number of uniformed women in peacekeeping missions.
- More peacekeeping operations missions have gender advisors—as of 2014, nine of the sixteen missions have gender advisors.
- There are mixed results in gender mainstreaming in DDR—some missions increased the numbers of women demobilized, but these gains were uneven across missions and reintegration remains a challenge.
- Sexual and gender-based violence continues to be widespread with impunity for those who commit it, despite increases in training and legislation.
  - Reports of sexual abuse and exploitation by peacekeeping forces continue to rise, despite increased attention to this problem within the UN.
  - Furthermore, women peace-builders and activists are regularly victims of violence and lack protection.
- Missions made a greater effort to protect women in refugee and internally displaced person settings through increased patrols and escorts, but resources for these protections were limited.

The 2014 Secretary-General's report on implementation of Resolution 1325 found that, while gender seems to be increasingly integrated into United Nations operations, challenges remain in fully implementing the resolution at the operational level. Within the UN, women, peace, and security is part of the rhetoric on peace and security: Security Council resolutions increasingly mention gender, UN Mission reports frequently mention women, peace, and security, and there is increased reporting on these issues in UN bodies. However, there continued to be widespread reports of sexual abuse and exploitation by peacekeeping operations, despite increased attention to the issue within the UN.

In honor of the resolution's 15th anniversary in 2015, the United Nations held a High-level Review of Resolution 1325 "to assess progress and accelerate action" at the Security Council's Open Debate on Women, Peace, and Security on 13 October 2015. Following the debate, UN Women published Preventing Conflict, Transforming Justice, Securing the Peace: A Global Study on the Implementation of United Nations Security Council Resolution 1325. The report covers progress and challenges, and makes recommendations for advancing the goals of the resolution across societal sectors.

In April 2016, UN Women and the Inclusive Peace and Transition Initiative, led by peace process expert Thania Paffenholz, issued a report initially prepared as an input for the High-Level Review, assessing women's inclusion and influence on peace negotiations.

== Criticisms ==
=== Gender essentialism ===
Some feminists criticize Resolution 1325 for relying on essentialist portrayals of women, rendering women as perpetual victims, and ignoring women's agency to bring about both violence and peace. For example, reports of violence against civilians tend to emphasize "women and children" as victims to illustrate the brutal nature of violence. Conversely, this framing also implies that men are not victims, despite male victims of sexual violence or the gender-based violence of killing men because they are men.

Gender essentialism also assumes that women are innately peaceful, usually due to their experience as mothers, which is one of the main reasons that people use to argue for including women in peace processes. Another frequently cited gender essentialist argument is that women are natural coalition builders and are more likely to work with members of other groups. Resolution 1325 incorporates these assumptions and they are frequently cited in the Secretary-General Reports, advocacy movements, and National Action Plans. The result is that women often feel the need to conform to certain stereotypes and that women who do not fit these ideals are marginalized in politics and policy.

=== Exclusive focus on women ===
A related criticism to that of gender essentialism is that by focusing exclusively on women the role of men is overlooked. According to this line of criticism, the values and attitudes among both men and women are more important than biological sex for violence and peace. Both men and women who hold feminist values, and thus are positive to gender equality, tend to be less warlike and intolerant. Since gender does not equal biological sex it is more relevant to focus on masculinities and femininities. For example, a study of political activists in Thailand found that men who identify with ideals of manhood emphasizing male superiority over women and the need for real men to be fierce and tough are more likely to participate in political violence.

=== Gender mainstreaming ===
Resolution 1325 supports gender mainstreaming, or the incorporation of a gender perspective into all policies and programs, in peacekeeping missions and other UN programs related to peace and security. Critics argue that other parts of the resolutions, such as having a Senior Gender Advisor, lead to the segregation of women's rights from all other peace and security issues, with women's issues thus becoming sidelined in a "gender ghetto" and remaining outside of the mainstream. By limiting women's issues to Gender Advisers or offices, security institutions continue to view gender issues as a niche topic and the institutions remain male-dominated systems. Germany initially did not implement a 1325 National Action Plan for this reason, arguing that it had mainstreamed gender concerns into its government agencies and policies, although it later implemented one in 2012.

=== Impacts ===
Despite the attention to implementing Resolution 1325 and developing indicators, there is little evidence of impacts in conflict-affected countries. The UN's own evaluations show limited progress only in a few areas, most notably women's political participation. Furthermore, the resolution depends on many unproven assumptions, such as the potential for women's participation to have a transformational effect on peace and security. However, recent initiatives have emphasized the need for more data to track results, including the upcoming High-Level Review of the resolution, which will likely provide more thorough analysis of its implementation and effects.

There is also research-based evidence suggesting a connection between gender inequality and the likelihood of conflicts.

== Related groups ==
The NGO Working Group on Women, Peace and Security is a coalition of eighteen NGOs, which collectively advocate for the equal and full participation of women in all efforts to create and maintain international peace and security. Formed in 2000 to call for a Security Council resolution on women, peace, and security, original members were:

- Women's International League for Peace and Freedom (WILPF)
- Amnesty International (AI)
- International Alert (IA)
- Women's Commission for Refugee Women and Children (WCRWC)
- Hague Appeal for Peace (HAP)

The NGO Working Group now focuses on implementation of all Security Council resolutions that address women, peace, and security. The group is still active, producing a monthly action points on the women, peace, and security issues affecting countries on Council's agenda.

PeaceWomen—one of the founding members of the NGO Working Group—is a project sponsored by the Women's International League for Peace and Freedom to promote the implementation of Resolution 1325, through providing a centralized hub of information on information related to women, peace, and security.

The Friends of 1325 is an informal or ad hoc group of UN member states who formed to advocate for the implementation of Resolution 1325; it is organized by Canada.

October 2020 saw the publication of a glossary entitled "Glossary of terms used in Resolution 1325 of the United Nations Security Council and its related resolutions on the Women, Peace and Security Agenda", translated from the original (French) into English by Claire Mazuhelli, edited by Tove Ivergård and Lina Hjärtström of Women's International League for Peace and Freedom (WILPF) Sweden, by author Annie Matundu Mbambi, gender and development consultant, Africa Regional Representative of the Women's International League for Peace and Freedom and former President of the Board of Directors of the same organization in the Democratic Republic of Congo (WILPF DRC).

== Related resolutions ==
Resolution 1325 is related to several other resolutions related to the topic of women, peace, and security, passed since 2000. These include:

- Resolution 1820 (2008), which condemns sexual violence as a weapon of war and declares rape and other forms of sexual violence as war crimes.
- Resolution 1888 (2009), which mandates that peacekeeping missions prevent and respond to sexual violence and which led to the creation of The Special Representative on Sexual Violence in Armed Conflict.
- Resolution 1889 (2009) on increasing women's participation in peace processes. This requests that the Secretary-General develop indicators to track the implementation of 1325, and establishes Women Protection Advisors to be deployed with peacekeeping missions.
- Resolution 1960 (2010) focuses on ending impunity for sexual violence in armed conflict by calling on the Secretary-General to "name and shame" armed groups that perpetrate sexual violence and for sanctions to deter conflict-related sexual violence.
- Resolution 2106 (2013) to address impunity on sexual violence in armed conflict and operationalize past resolutions. It also recognizes that sexual violence in conflict can also affect men and boys, as well as the community-wide trauma that sexual violence can inflict.
- Resolution 2122 (2013) reaffirms the Council's commitment to combating sexual violence in armed conflict and the full implementation of Resolution 1325 and other resolutions on women, peace, and security.
- Resolution 2242 (2015) establishes the Security Council's Informal Experts Group on Women, Peace and Security and focuses on greater integration of the agendas on women, peace and security with the UN's work on counter-terrorism and countering violent extremism.
- Resolution 2467 (2019) positions conflict-related sexual violence as firmly rooted in the broader women, peace and security agenda, calls for support and protection to women’s civil society organizations, and calls for attention to the issue of children born of rape.
- Resolution 2493 (2019) calls for full implementation of all previous resolutions on women, peace and security and requests the UN to develop context-specific approaches for women's participation in all UN-supported peace processes.

== See also ==
- List of United Nations Security Council Resolutions 1301 to 1400 (2000–2002)
- Vienna Declaration and Programme of Action
- U.S. National Action Plan on Women, Peace, and Security
