= CAAC =

CAAC or Caac may refer to:

- Civil Aviation Administration of China, which oversees civil aviation in China
  CAAC Airlines, China's former monopoly airline operated by CAAC
- Capital Area Activities Conference, a high school sports league centered on Lansing, Michigan, USA
- Cardiff Amateur Athletic Club, a Cardiff-based athletics club
- Working Group on Children and Armed Conflict, United Nations
- Chinese Athletics Administrative Center, a sporting governing body in China
- Computer-Aided Algorithmic Composition
- The Contemporary African Art Collection, a private collection created in 1990 by Italian business man Jean Pigozzi
- Cyclic alkyl amino carbenes, a class of chemical substances with a low valent carbon atom
- Caac language, spoken in New Caledonia
