= United Nations Security Council Resolution 2032 =

UN Security Council Resolution 2032
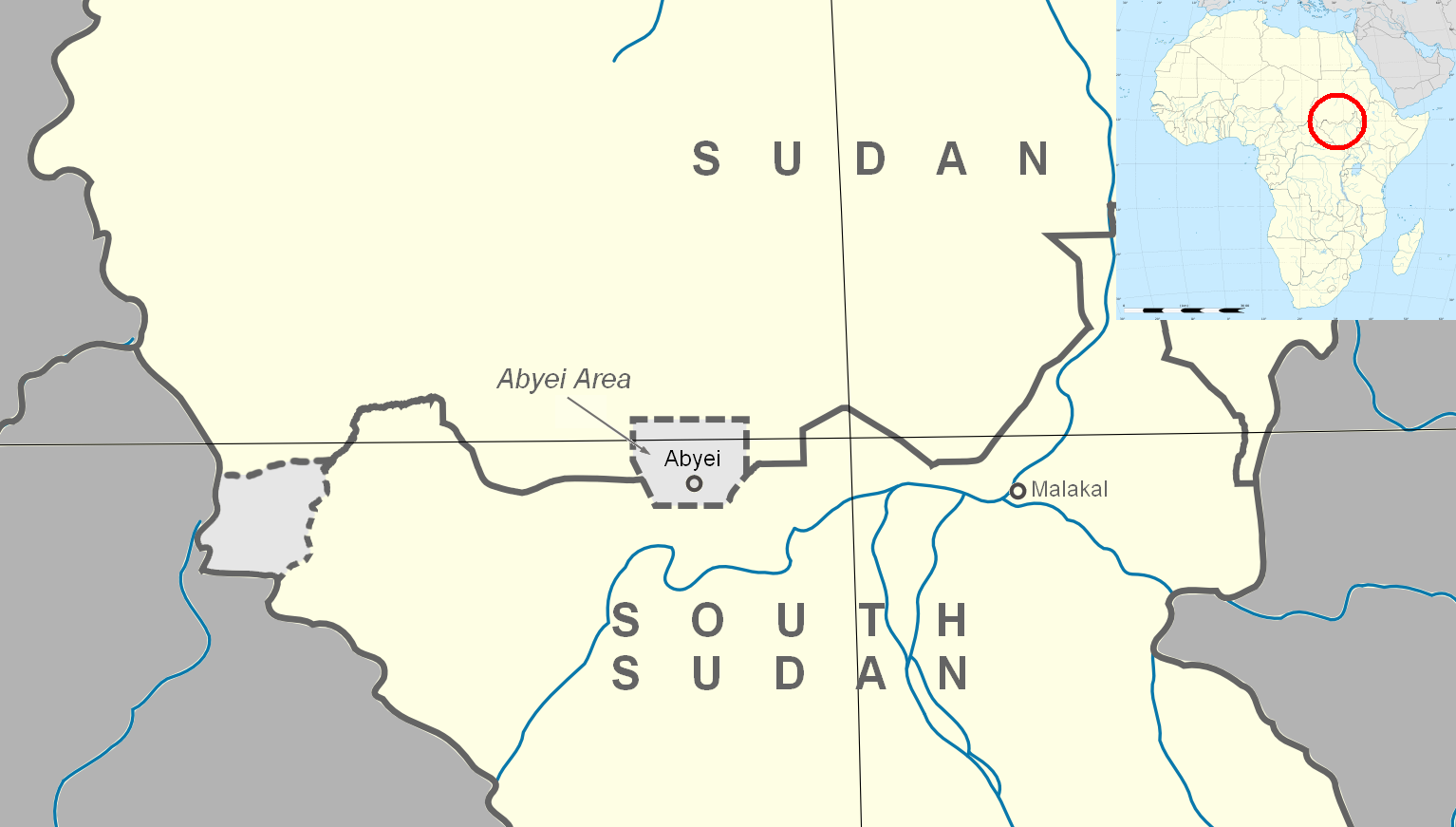
- Map of Abyei
- Date: 22 December 2011
- Meeting no.: 6,699
- Code: S/RES/2032 (Document)
- Subject: Reports of the Secretary-General on the Sudan
- Voting summary: 15 voted for; None voted against; None abstained
- Result: Adopted

Security Council composition
- Permanent members: China; France; Russia; United Kingdom; United States
- Non-permanent members: Bosnia–Herzegovina; Brazil; Colombia; Germany; Gabon; India; Lebanon; Nigeria; Portugal; South Africa

United Nations Security Council Resolution 2032 was unanimously adopted on December 22, 2011, after recalling resolution 1889 (2009). The council also demanded that Sudan and South Sudan urgently finalize the establishment of the Abyei Area Administration and Police Service in accordance with previous agreements, urging them to make use of the mechanisms that had been developed to resolve outstanding issues related to the borders and the demilitarized zone.

== See also ==
- List of United Nations Security Council Resolutions 2001 to 2100
