= U.S. National Action Plan on Women, Peace, and Security =

US initiative to support women

The U.S. National Action Plan on Women, Peace, and Security was adopted when President Barack Obama signed an executive order (Executive Order 13595) on December 19, 2011, 11 years after the United Nations Security Council adopted United Nations Security Council Resolution 1325 on women, peace, and security. It specified initiatives and activities that will empower and enlist women and girls in efforts to achieve international peace and security. The U.S. NAP was formally revised in June 2016. On June 11, 2019, the White House released the U.S. Strategy on Women, Peace, and Security, which superseded the National Action Plan.

The National Action Plan was developed by a broad inter-agency group led by White House National Security Council staff which also included representatives from civil society networks. The U.S. NAP contained five objectives outlining the U.S. government's commitments to promoting women's roles in global peace and security: National Integration and Institutionalization, Participation in Peace Processes and Decision-making, Protection from Violence, Conflict Prevention, and Access to Relief and Recovery. The plan also listed outcomes, actions, and responsible agencies for each objective.

To enhance implementation and increase accountability, the plan called for the three main implementing agencies – the Department of State, Department of Defense, and the U.S. Agency for International Development – to submit their own fully funded, time-bound plans for implementation and evaluation, with a requirement for annual reporting.

== Iterations and versions ==
- December 1, 2011 National Action Plan is created
- December 2, 2013 USAID Implementation Plan is released
- August 1, 2014 Overview of 2013 Implementation Plan is released
- April 7, 2015 Overview of 2014 Implementation Plan is released
- June 2016 updated National Action Plan is released
- October 2017 Women, Peace, and Security Act of 2017 enacted
- June 2019 The US Strategy on Women, Peace, and Security is released and supersedes the National Action Plan

== Challenges to implementation ==
An August 2012 Implementation Plan set priorities for implementation of the National Action Plan. Full implementation of women, peace, and security objectives put forward by the U.S. National Action Plan has been limited by external challenges ranging from lack of political will among international partners to societal discrimination against women in countries around the world. Internally, several factors have limited the ability of the U.S. government to fully integrate women, peace, and security objectives across all relevant work streams: resource and staffing limitations, insufficient training on gender-sensitive policies and programming, and uneven monitoring and evaluation are challenges to the plan.

As Secretary of State, Hillary Clinton led the integration of women's issues as a core component of US foreign assistance and foreign policy. When she stepped down in 2012, some questioned whether the gains would be preserved. An opinion piece in POLITICO stated, "The challenges for women are still steep, but they are stepping up to take ownership of their futures like never before. It’s hard to imagine an effective U.S. engagement with the world that does not take this powerful global change into account."

In 2015, a Huffington Post piece on foreign policy in Afghanistan referred to the US National Action Plan, observing, "In the political world, there is often a long distance between words on a page and realities on the ground."

Also in 2015, a New York Times article took President Obama to task for excluding women from regions impacted by violent extremism from a White House Summit on Countering Violent Extremism, "instead of honoring the U.S. NAP’s commitment to include women leaders."

== Feminist foreign policy pre-UNSCR 1325 ==
Ambassador Swanee Hunt was the U.S. ambassador to Austria in the Clinton administration. During that decade the region was embroiled in post-Soviet conflict, and Ambassador Hunt acted as a third party peace-maker. Writing for PRISM, a publication that addresses complex operations in security, Hunt discussed her role. During negotiations she arranged amongst Yugoslavian representatives she was embarrassed to realize she hadn't included a single woman in the peacemaking discussion, despite the many women contacts she had in the region. She lamented that if she had included the perspective of women who were dealing with the Balkan conflict it would have illuminated the dangers of partition and problem with appointing old war criminals who had destroyed these women's communities as new leaders. Hunt wrote,

“Women’s perspectives had been missing at Dayton where, many told me, they would have made clear the ‘guaranteed’ right of return would be meaningless without the apprehension of war criminals. How could anyone return to a village where the police chief or mayor, still in office, had overseen genocidal rapes and murders? Not ideology, but pragmatism was the common thread that ran through [women in Bosnia's] words to me. But they had been excluded—first, by their own nationalist power brokers, and then by ‘the internationals’ who rewarded extremists with all available seats at the negotiating table. The result was not only a flawed right of return, but also a country bifurcated.”

There was growing international sentiment in the 90s that the well being of people, not states, should be of utmost priority to the peace and security community.

This idea of women in peace and security was entered into the pop cultural cannon with then first-lady Hillary Clinton's remarks at the 1995 World Women Conference in Beijing. She proclaimed that “Human rights are women’s rights and women’s rights are human rights.” This speech signaled another turning point towards taking a gendered approach to foreign policy making. Clinton's speech highlights the rumblings about the ways wars uniquely impact women that were starting to be discussed in the early 90s. These rumblings eventually led to the passage of UNSCR 1325.

== United Nations Security Council Resolution 1325 ==
Approved by the UN in 2000, this resolution was “Reaffirming the important role of women in the prevention and resolution of conflicts and in peace-building, and stressing the importance of their equal participation and full involvement in all efforts for the maintenance and promotion of peace and security, and the need to increase their role in decision-making with regard to conflict prevention and resolution.”

The Landmark Resolution on Women, Peace, and Security urges all actors to “increase the participation of women and incorporate gender perspectives in all United Nations peace and security efforts and also calls on all parties to conflict to take special measures to protect women and girls from gender-based violence, particularly rape and other forms of sexual abuse, in situations of armed conflict.”

UNSCR 1325 was the culmination of the last decade's shift in international thinking about women and security. The UN took a hard look at how women are uniquely positioned to make lasting peace but are also disproportionately harmed by violent conflict in ways that are rarely prosecuted, gender based violence and sexual violence being a few examples.

In 2004 the UN urged all member states to create their own National Action Plans on Women, Peace, and Security. As of 2019 79 nations (40% of members) have adopted their own plans, with even fewer nations funding their plans as priorities in national budgets.

More recently there have been many conversations on how women will be most affected by the consequences of climate change, and how policy makers might purposefully include women in creating strategies to combat climate change.

== Executive Order 13595 ==
Executive Order 13595 was signed by President Obama on December 11, 2011. The plan is broken down into the five objectives, essentially the reasons behind the creation and implementation of the Executive Order, and the four benchmarks, which allow policymakers to measure the success of each new policy with specific guidelines in mind.

The Five Objectives:

1. National Integration and Institutionalization
2. Participation in Peace Processes and Decision-making
3. Protection from Violence
4. Conflict Prevention
5. Access to Relief and Recovery

The first objective, national integration and institutionalization, emphasizes that gender inclusion is essential to U.S. efforts to promote peace and prevent conflicts. The second objective, participation in peace processes and decision-making, highlights the responsibility of the U.S. government to uphold equality for women in positions of leadership in peace processes and decision-making positions. The third objective, protection from violence, discusses the U.S. role in preventing violence against women and holding perpetrators accountable to the fullest extent of the law. The fourth objective, conflict prevention, states that women's roles in conflict prevention position will be promoted as well as means to prevent conflict such as increasing women's access to education, health conditions, and economic opportunities. The fifth objective, access to relief and recovery, emphasizes that the U.S. government will respond to women and children in areas of conflict with accessible aid and assistance.

The Four Benchmarks:

1. Gender Analysis
2. Inclusion
3. Resources
4. Accountability

The four benchmarks are used to evaluate any actions carried out by the U.S. government through the U.S. National Action Plan on Women, Peace, and Security. The first benchmark, gender analysis, measures the impact of a policy on all genders. The second benchmark, inclusion, measures how well an action includes the consultation of relevant community members, specifically female community members and those directly impacted by a conflict or a policy. The third benchmark, resources, measures the budget of each project and if the project is an extension of an action already in place. The fourth benchmark, accountability, measures how accountable individuals, offices, and agencies are in ensuring an action is implemented successfully and that relevant deadlines are successfully met.

== U.S. National Action Plan on Women, Peace, and Security ==
Created on December 1, 2011, and maintained as mandated by Executive Order 13595 this plan is the culmination of the past 20 years of thinking on women and foreign policy. The plan is equally about promoting women's involvement in peacemaking in order to have more stable peace and protecting women against gender based violence that is overlooked in times of war and inadequately prosecuted.

The plan was deemed politically expedient in large part due to the growing proof that including women in peace processes makes the deals more effective. “Evidence shows that peace agreements are more likely to be secured—and are more likely to endure—when women are meaningfully involved.” That is the tactical portion of the argument for the NAP, women mean good peace deals and increased security. Women make up less than 5% of peace agreement signers, and 50% of peace agreements fail within five years, the thinking goes that if the first number includes more women the second number might include longer peace.

The feminist argument policy for the plan lies with the idea that Hillary Clinton articulated in the 90s, that women's rights are human rights, and therefore women should be given the agency to determine peace in their countries where they make up half the population. “Tragically, war remains a regular and recurring feature of the human experience In many instances, conflicts have recurred or been prolonged in significant part because women—those who suffered the worst of the violence and bore the burden of reconstruction—were excluded from the negotiating table and the benefits of peace” War also disproportionately affects women and that gender based violence should be included in discourse around war crimes.

This plan was implemented during Hillary Clinton's tenure as Secretary of State, and the plan faced backlash as being simply a women's issue or a pet project of Secretary Clinton because she was a woman, a largely inconsequential piece of U.S. foreign policy. In response Secretary Clinton offered these remarks when speaking at a release event shortly after the plan was announced, “Now, why is all this happening, all these countries, the United Nations, NATO, and certainly us? Well, the reason is because we are convinced. We have enough anecdotal evidence and research that demonstrates women in peacekeeping is both the right thing to do and the smart thing, as well. It’s right, because, after all, women are affected disproportionately by conflict; they deserve to participate in the decisions that shape their own lives. And it’s the smart thing because we have seen again and again that women participating in these processes builds more durable peace.”

== Larger implications for feminist foreign policy ==
The U.S. National Action Plan on Women, Peace, and Security has led to the United States adopting a way of looking at the peace process through a gender lens. The field of feminist foreign policy has historically been left out of the peace process. But now with the U.S. National Action Plan on Women, Peace, and Security there is precedent for inclusion of those affected by peace discussions to have a place in this crucial process, specifically women.

Since the implementation of the U.S. National Action Plan on Women, Peace, and Security there have been a few key global moments that show the larger impact on bringing feminist foreign policy as more mainstream in the international community. A few key events include:

- G8 Foreign Ministers Meeting (April 11, 2013) - Foreign Ministers endorsed the Declaration of Sexual Violence in Conflict
- “Women Key to Peace and Security” Speech by Sec. of State John Kerry - continued commitment to supporting women in order to build lasting peace in conflict and post-conflict areas
- “Women of Character, Courage, and Commitment at the Department of Defense” - highlights how women leaders in U.S. DoD promotes national foreign interests through their peacebuilding skills
- Global Summit to End Sexual Violence in Conflict June 2014 - Sec. of State John Kerry in London continues to announce U.S. financial support and launching increased initiatives
- U.S. Dep. of State “Women Leaders: Promoting Peace and Security” bringing 85 women to explore how women can advocate for peace, promote stability, and improve security conditions
- “Call to Action Ministerial on Protection from Gender Based Violence in Emergencies” Sec. of State John Kerry encourages that not only women leaders should care about this issue
- October 2015 - U.S. continues commitment through series of financial support totalling $31.3 million

The impact of this plan is also present in the academic world. Since the implementation of the U.S. National Action Plan on Women, Peace, and Security through Executive Order 13595 by President Barack Obama there have been academic institutions establishing specific programs focused on advancing the topic of women, peace, and security. A few key examples of programs creation at academic institutions in the United States and internationally include:

- The Georgetown Institute for Women, Peace and Security, established in 2010
- The Program on Women, Peace, and Security (WPS) at Texas A&M University established in November 2015
- Centre for Women, Peace and Security at The London School of Economics and Political Science established in 2015
- Women, Peace, and Security at Columbia University

Along with specific academic programs, academic institutions have also created spaces to increase the discussion around women, peace, and security through course offerings, fellowship programs, and lecture series.

In academic literature there has been an increase in the discussion of how to battle violence and advocate for lasting peace through the Women, Peace, and Security agenda. A few key examples of academics specifically addressing the impact of Women, Peace, and Security on foreign policy are Laura Shepherd and Megan MacKenzie, who both are currently working at the University of Sydney in Sydney, Australia.

== Women, Peace, and Security Act ==
One of the early pieces of legislation enacted by the Trump administration was the Women, Peace, and Security Act in 2017. While the law does not formally cite UNSCR 1325 or Executive Order 13595, it marks a formal step to codify in U.S. law the importance of women to the nation and globe's peace and security. The law was the first comprehensive legislation in the world recognizing women as critical to peacemaking and security maintenance and echoed many of themes captured within UN Security Council resolutions. Its preamble states

“This bill expresses the sense of Congress that: the United States should be a global leader in promoting the participation of women in conflict prevention, management, and resolution and post-conflict relief and recovery efforts; the political participation and leadership of women in fragile environments, particularly during democratic transitions, is critical to sustaining democratic institutions; and the participation of women in conflict prevention and conflict resolution helps promote more inclusive and democratic societies and is critical to country and regional stability.”

The Women, Peace, and Security Act required a national strategy as well as stand-alone implementation plans for each participating department, including the Department of Defense, the Department of Homeland Security, the Department of State, and the U.S. Agency for International Development.

The U.S. Strategy on Women, Peace, and Security was released on June 11, 2019, and formally supplanted the U.S. National Action Plan. In a statement marking the release, the White House recognized that ”societies that empower women economically and politically are far more stable and peaceful.“

A corresponding government-wide metrics framework was released in October 2019, offering a singular framework for measuring progress.
