= United Nations Security Council Resolution 1960 =

UN Security Council Resolution 1960
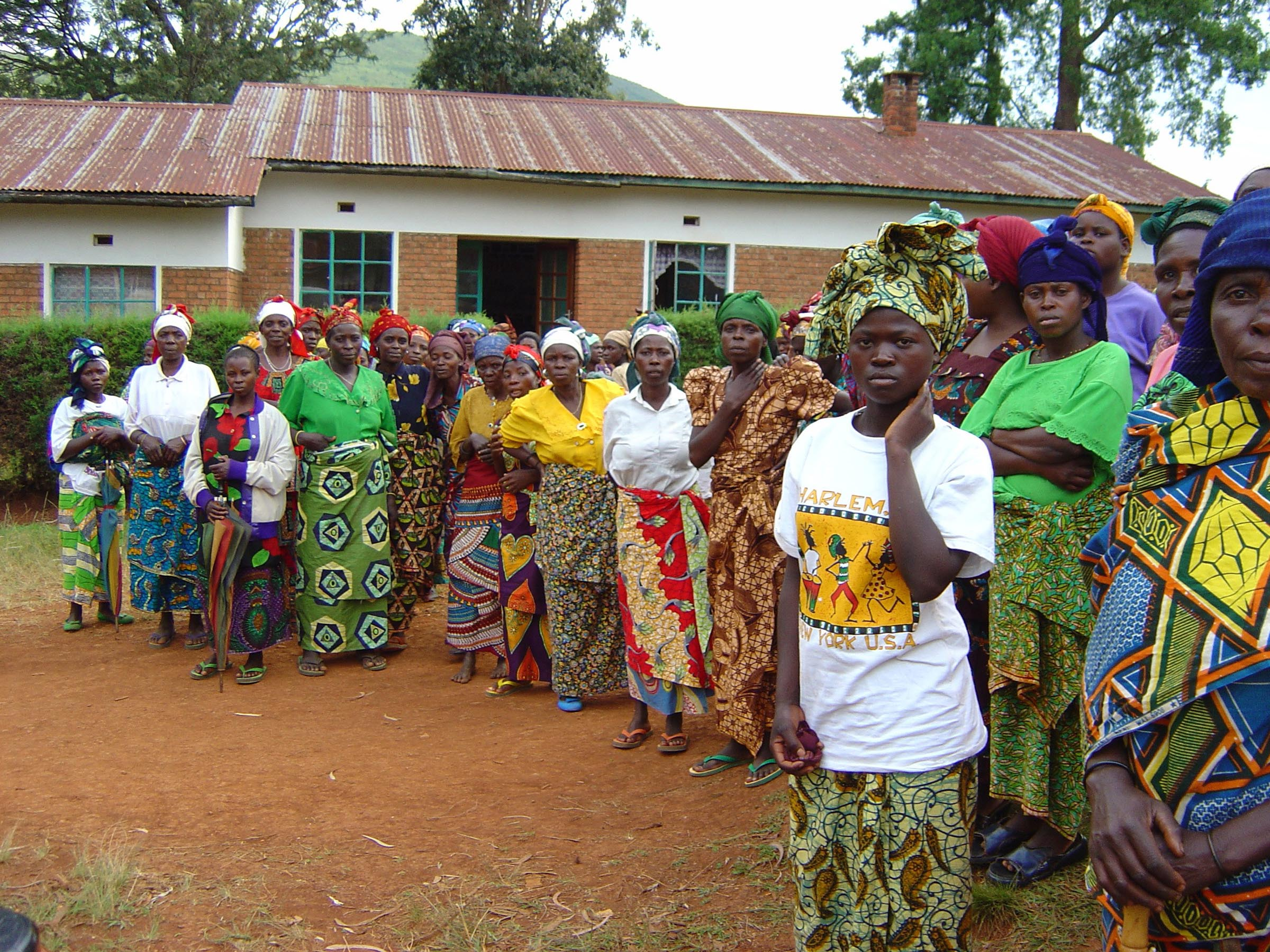
- Meeting of victims of sexual violence in the Democratic Republic of the Congo
- Date: 16 December 2010
- Meeting no.: 6,453
- Code: S/RES/1960 (Document)
- Subject: Women and peace and security
- Voting summary: 15 voted for; None voted against; None abstained
- Result: Adopted

Security Council composition
- Permanent members: China; France; Russia; United Kingdom; United States
- Non-permanent members: Austria; Bosnia–Herzegovina; Brazil; Gabon; Japan; Lebanon; Mexico; Nigeria; Turkey; Uganda

United Nations Security Council Resolution 1960, adopted unanimously on December 16, 2010, after recalling resolutions 1325 (2000), 1612 (2005), 1674 (2006), 1820 (2008), 1882 (2009), 1888 (2009), 1889 (2009) and 1894 (2009), the Council requested information on parties suspected of patterns of sexual violence during armed conflict to be made available to it.

The resolution was sponsored by 60 countries. Its adoption was praised by Human Rights Watch, which called it "a tremendous step toward ending this horrendous practice".

== Observations ==
In the preamble of the resolution, the Council expressed concern at the slow progress on the issue of sexual violence in armed conflict, particularly against women and children. Moreover, despite calls to all parties involved in conflict and condemnation, such acts continued to occur. It reminded all states to comply with international law and for leaders to demonstrate commitment to prevent sexual violence, combat impunity and uphold accountability, as inaction would send the wrong message. Perpetrators of war crimes and genocide had to prosecuted, emphasising the primary responsibility of states to respect and ensure human rights of people within their territory.

The resolution noted that ending impunity was essential if a society was to recover from conflict, and in this regard, there needed to be better access to health care, psychosocial support, legal assistance and the needs of persons with disabilities. The Council recalled the number of sexual offences in the Rome Statute of the International Criminal Court. It welcomed attempts to address the issue in peacekeeping missions, including tackling sexual violence and promoting the role of women in civil and military functions.

== Acts ==
The Council condemned the widespread and systematic use of sexual abuse against the civilian population in situations of armed conflict, and that taking steps to combat it would contribute towards the maintenance of international peace and security. It called for an end to all acts of sexual violence. The Secretary-General was asked to include information on parties suspected to be responsible for acts of rape or other acts of sexual violence, which the Council would use to engage with the parties or take action against them. The list would be made public.

The resolution asked parties to armed conflict to make commitments against the use of sexual violence and investigations into alleged abuses, which the Secretary-General was asked to monitor. The Council stated its intention to designate criteria pertaining to acts of rape and other forms of sexual violence when reviewing or adopting sanctions. Meanwhile, the Secretary-General was instructed to devise monitoring, analysis and reporting arrangements on conflict-related sexual violence, while ensuring full transparency.

The Security Council praised the work of gender advisers and looked forward to the appointment of women protection advisers in peacekeeping missions. States were encouraged to use scenario-based training materials provided by the Secretary-General before the deployment of peacekeeping operations, with the Council pledging to pay attention to sexual violence in mandate renewals and authorisations. Furthermore, states were asked deploy greater numbers of female police and military personnel in peacekeeping operations.

Finally, the Secretary-General was asked to strengthen the policy of zero tolerance on sexual exploitation and abuse by United Nations personnel, and report regularly to the Council on progress in implementing the current resolution.

== See also ==
- List of United Nations Security Council Resolutions 1901 to 2000 (2009–2011)
- Women's rights
