= United Nations Security Council Resolution 2068 =

UN Security Council Resolution 2068
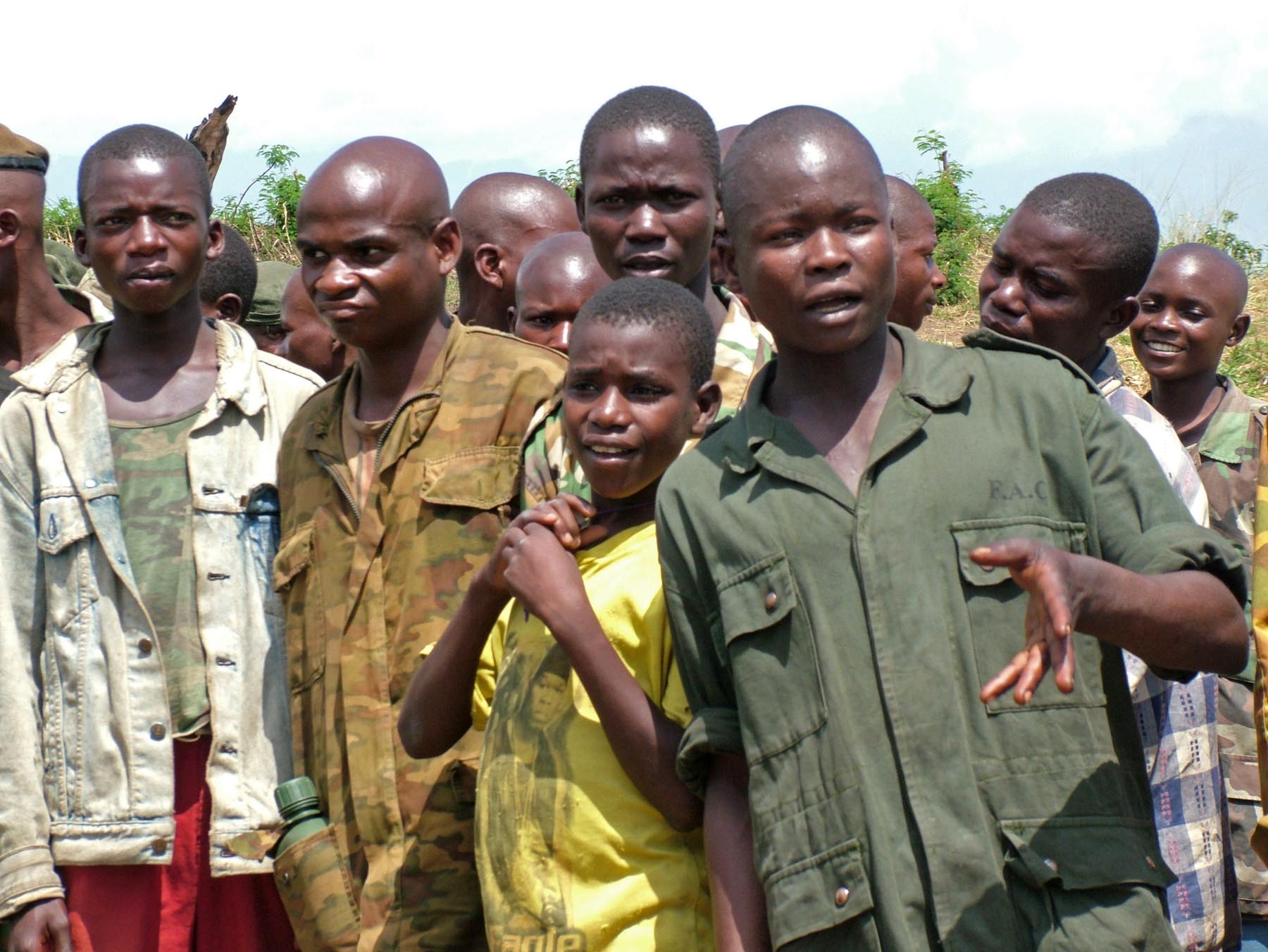
- Child soldiers in the Congo
- Date: 19 September 2012
- Meeting no.: 6,838
- Code: S/RES/2068 (Document)
- Subject: Children and armed conflict
- Voting summary: 11 voted for; None voted against; 4 abstained
- Result: Adopted

Security Council composition
- Permanent members: China; France; Russia; United Kingdom; United States
- Non-permanent members: Azerbaijan; Colombia; Germany; Guatemala; India; Morocco; Pakistan; Portugal; South Africa; Togo

United Nations Security Council Resolution 2068 was adopted on 19 September 2012. It declared the readiness of the United Nations Security Council to impose sanctions on armed groups persistently violating the human rights of children including child abuse and child soldier.

Four of the fifteen members of the Security Council, Azerbaijan, China, Pakistan, and Russia, abstained from voting, expressing their governments' reservations on the text adopted, while the other eleven members voted in favour of the resolution.

== See also ==
- List of United Nations Security Council Resolutions 2001 to 2100
- Military use of children
- Working Group on Children and Armed Conflict
