= Working Group on Children and Armed Conflict =

United Nations working group

The United Nations Security Council Working Group on Children and Armed Conflict (CAAC) was introduced in July 2005 to recommend methods of protecting children impacted by armed conflicts.

== Formation ==
The CAAC came out of the 2005 Millennium Summit as a voice denouncing the use of children in armed conflicts. Children in many parts of the world are being forced to bear arms and wage war alongside adults. To address and counter this heinous practice, the Security Council decided to establish a working group to address this matter.

== Programmes ==
The United Nations Security Council Working Group on Children and Armed Conflict was established by the United Nations Security Council Resolution 1612 in 2005 to address issues related to children in armed conflict situations. Representatives of the 15 member countries of the Council regularly meet and discuss countries or situations with a view to providing written recommendations that would have to be followed up by the concerned countries or situations. In discharging its work, the Working Group is assisted by the Office of Special Representative of the Secretary General on Children and Armed Conflict, which provides substantive inputs to the work of the Working Group and follows up on the agreed outcome of the Working Group. The Working Group produces conclusions and recommendations that have been developed among the fifteen members of the Working Group. Since its inception, there has been progress in this field that is of particular importance to the international community.

=== Negotiations ===
Negotiation in the context of the United Nations Security Council tends to be intensive and time-consuming and may be trying for those who have little patience. Negotiations normally occur inside one of the UN conference rooms, but in some cases there will be informal negotiations among members to find an agreed outcome. This interplay of formal and informal negotiation contributes to the fluidity and active dynamics of the process itself. A certain outcome can be agreed after a few meetings but other can consume considerable amount of time that span to months of negotiation. This is due to the complexity and sensitivity of the issue at hand that one single word would need long hour of negotiation as it can be interpreted in various ways depending on the national interests of the concerned countries and other factors.

Take for example negotiation on a resolution on one particular issue, one of the operative paragraphs can generate heated debate whether the Security Council should "take note" the report from the Secretary General, or should the Security Council just "acknowledge with appreciation the report" or "welcome the report". In most cases, the Security Council should welcome or at minimum acknowledge with appreciation the report since in most cases reports by the Secretary General is in compliance with the explicit request of the Security Council. This issue can generate such a long debate because the report might contain elements that are directly or indirectly affecting the national interests of one of the members. On one side, "to acknowledge with appreciation" might be construed as challenging or undermining the said country. On the other side, "to acknowledge with appreciation" can be used as a negotiating tool to put pressures on the said country that viewed it as a threat or challenging its national interests. It is worth to note as well that reports of the Secretary-General can be highly political and sensitive. Here, we generally use the term Secretary-General to refer to the UN Secretariat that is mandated to render services to the Member-States of the United Nations that are currently composed of 193 countries (including, annual and thematic reports)

It is worth noting that negotiation in the UN setting is typically a multi-party negotiation where there are more than two countries that are involved in the negotiation. Since there are more than two countries, there are multiple interests that have to be considered and accommodated.

The Special Representative of the Secretary-General for Children and Armed Conflict is a member of the United Nations Development Group.

== See also ==
- United Nations Security Council Resolution 2068
