= United Nations Security Council Resolution 2069 =

UN Security Council Resolution 2069
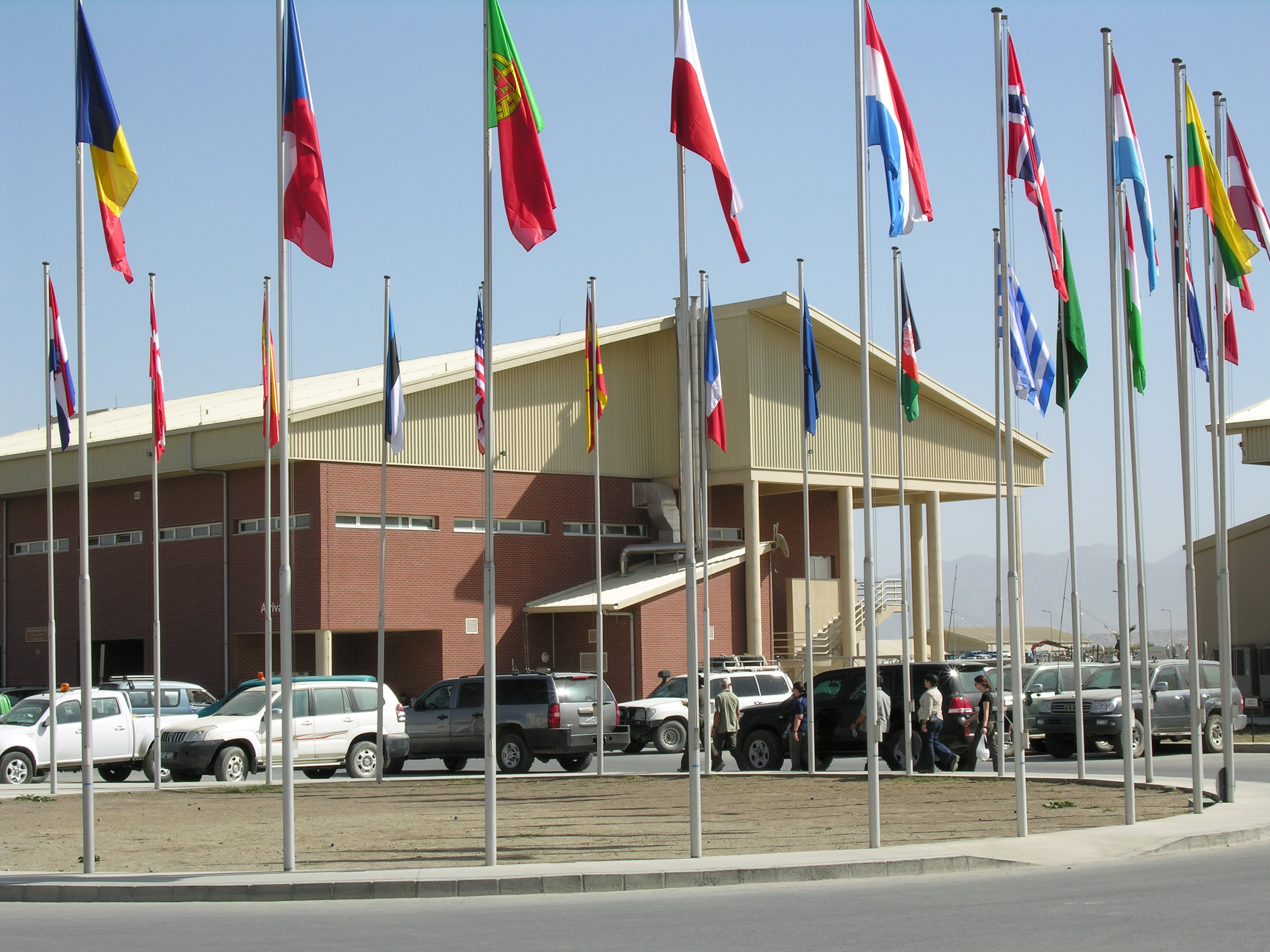
- ISAF's military terminal at Kabul International Airport
- Date: 9 October 2012
- Meeting no.: 6,843
- Code: S/RES/2069 (Document)
- Subject: The situation in Afghanistan
- Voting summary: 15 voted for; None voted against; None abstained
- Result: Adopted

Security Council composition
- Permanent members: China; France; Russia; United Kingdom; United States
- Non-permanent members: Azerbaijan; Colombia; Germany; Guatemala; India; Morocco; Pakistan; Portugal; South Africa; Togo

United Nations Security Council Resolution 2069 was unanimously adopted at its 6843rd meeting, on 9 October 2012.

== See also ==
- List of United Nations Security Council Resolutions 2001 to 2100
- War in Afghanistan (2001–2021)
