= United Nations Security Council Resolution 2122 =

UN Security Council Resolution 2122
- Date: 18 October 2013
- Meeting no.: 7,044
- Code: S/RES/2122 (Document)
- Subject: Women and Peace and Security
- Voting summary: 15 voted for; None voted against; None abstained
- Result: Adopted

Security Council composition
- Permanent members: China; France; Russia; United Kingdom; United States
- Non-permanent members: Argentina; Australia; Azerbaijan; Guatemala; South Korea; Luxembourg; Morocco; Pakistan; Rwanda; Togo

United Nations Security Council resolution 2122 was adopted in 2013.

== See also ==
- List of United Nations Security Council Resolutions 2101 to 2200 (2013–2015)
