= United Nations Security Council Resolution 2242 =

UN Security Council Resolution 2242
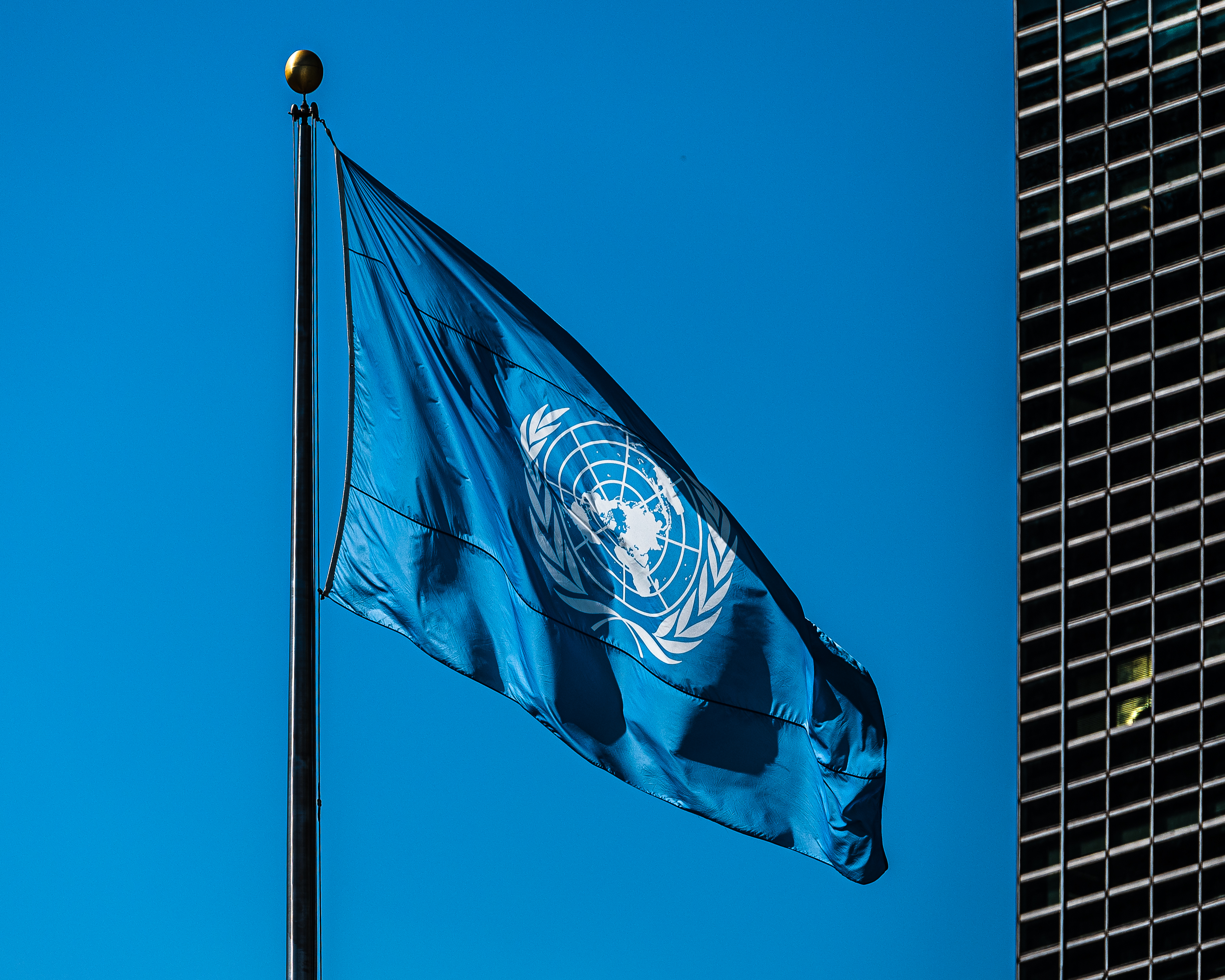
- UN flag
- Date: 13 October 2015
- Meeting no.: 7,533
- Code: S/RES/2242 (Document)
- Subject: Women and Peace and Security
- Voting summary: 15 voted for; None voted against; None abstained
- Result: Adopted

Security Council composition
- Permanent members: China; France; Russia; United Kingdom; United States
- Non-permanent members: Angola; Chad; Chile; Jordan; Lithuania; Malaysia; New Zealand; Nigeria; Spain; Venezuela

United Nations Security Council resolution 2242, noting the nexus of women, war, and climate change, was adopted in 2015. The Resolution recognized that climate change affects women especially. Ultimately, resolution 2242 "reaffirms that women’s empowerment and gender equality are critical to conflict prevention and broader efforts to maintain international peace and security."

== See also ==
- List of United Nations Security Council Resolutions 2201 to 2300 (2015–2016)
