= United Nations Security Council Resolution 2106 =

UN Security Council Resolution 2106
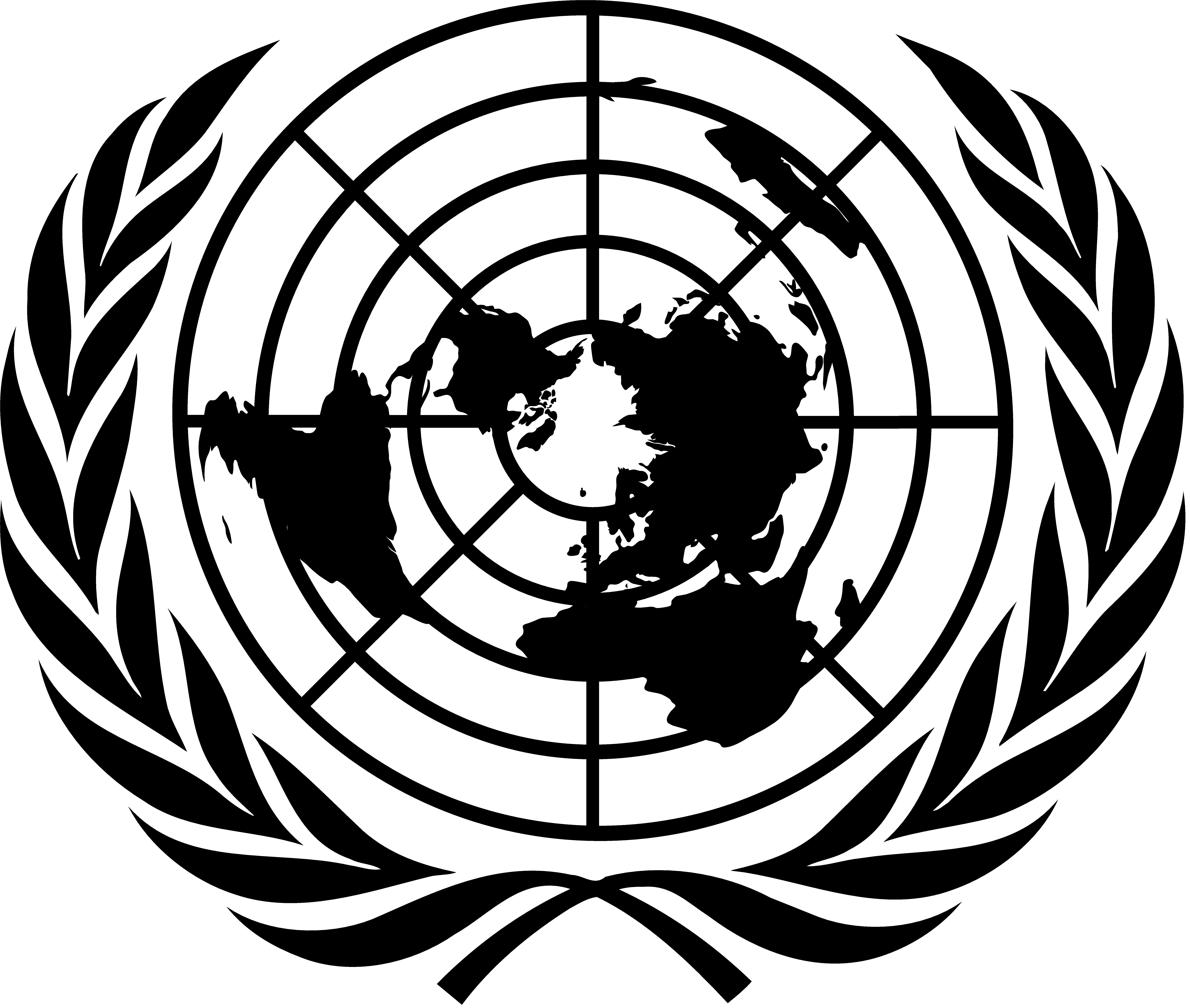
- UN emblem
- Date: 24 June 2013
- Meeting no.: 6984
- Code: S/RES/2106 (Document)
- Subject: Women and Peace and Security
- Voting summary: 15 voted for; None voted against; None abstained
- Result: Adopted

Security Council composition
- Permanent members: China; France; Russia; United Kingdom; United States
- Non-permanent members: Argentina; Australia; Azerbaijan; Guatemala; South Korea; Luxembourg; Morocco; Pakistan; Rwanda; Togo

Adopted unanimously on June 24th, 2013, the United Nations Security Council Resolution 2106 (S/RES/2106) centers around the protection of women from sexual violence, especially in armed conflict or post-conflict areas. The resolution highlights the need for countries to both:

(1) implement firm regulations around the prosecution of sexual violence crimes

(2) adequately address the origin of such crimes

It further states that in order to fulfill these needs, promoting women's (political/social/economic) empowerment, gender equality, and encouraging men and boys' cooperation to combat women-centered violence is imperative in order to enact long-term change.

== Historical Context and Implementation ==
The United Nations first classified rape as a war crime with Security Council Resolution 1820 in 2008. Rape and other forms of sexual violence are also explicitly prohibited under International Humanitarian Law (IHL). Resolution 2106 addresses the need to challenge the idea of sexual violence in conflict areas being an inevitability, or a symptom of specific cultural values.

Resolution 2106 is the sixth resolution passed relating to Women, Peace and Security, and the fourth relating to sexual violence in conflict. This resolution differs from previous resolutions passed by the UN Security Council in that it establishes more specific processes for how women's empowerment and protection from sexual violence in conflict areas can be achieved. It also urges that these process be implemented at a more accelerated rate.

While the resolution emphasizes the need for such protections for women and girls first and foremost, as sexual violence disproportionately impacts them, it also notably specifies that men and boys are also able to be victims of sexual violence. Further implementation of outlined process would only serve to benefit them as well, whether they be direct victims or "secondarily traumatized as forced witnesses".

A need for Women Protection Advisors (WPAs) to be deployed in armed-conflict and post-conflict areas to protect against sexual violence was first outlined as a need in Resolution 1888, which was adopted in 2009. Resolution 2106 indicates that deployment of WPAs to conflict areas has not been sufficient, and must be increased for effective implementation in accordance to Resolution 1888. Resolution 2106 further detailed a need for these Advisors to be effectively trained, and for systemic checks to be put in place to assess such training.

Most prominently, Resolution 2106 specified a need for more strict and accurately enforced legal action against perpetrators of sexual violence. Sexual violence when implemented as a war tactic often both worsens and lengthens the duration of armed conflict. Criminal prosecution is absolutely necessary to hinder the occurrence of such acts and help maintain international security long-term.

== Reflection ==
CARE International, an international NGO focused on providing humanitarian advocacy and relief, offers salient points of reflection to the passing of Resolution 2106.

First, they emphasize that seeking justice through criminal prosecution of perpetrators of sexual crimes is important, but must never come at the cost of the safety of their victims. An important consideration that must be made is that victims of sexual violence face often face retaliatory violence should they seek retribution. Therefore, it is of utmost importance that protection of victims is provided alongside prosecution of the perpetrators.

They also specify the importance for medical, mental health and general well-being services as well as livelihood support services to be offered to victims in conflict areas.

== Related Resolutions ==
Ten resolutions on Women, Peace, and Security have been adopted by the United Nations Security Council, alongside Resolution 2106.

1. Resolution 1325

2. Resolution 1820

3. Resolution 1888

4. Resolution 1889

5. Resolution 1960

6. Resolution 2106: See above

7. Resolution 2122

8. Resolution 2242

9. Resolution 2467

10. Resolution 2493

== See also ==
- List of United Nations Security Council Resolutions 2101 to 2200 (2013–2015)
