= United Nations Security Council Resolution 1888 =

UN Security Council Resolution 1888
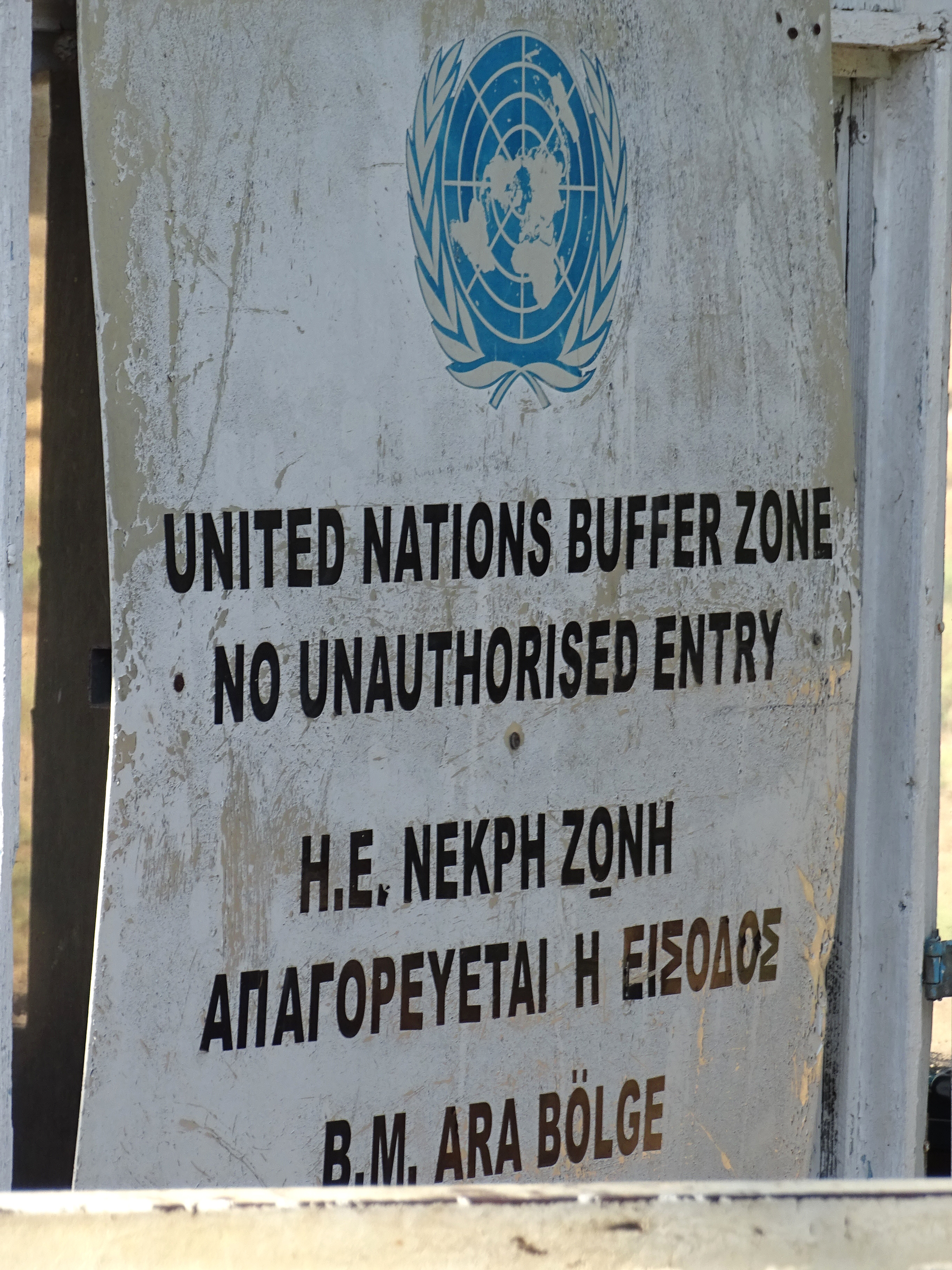
- Buffer zone in Nicosia
- Date: 30 September 2009
- Meeting no.: 6,195
- Code: S/RES/1888 (Document)
- Subject: Women and peace and security
- Voting summary: 15 voted for; None voted against; None abstained
- Result: Adopted

Security Council composition
- Permanent members: China; France; Russia; United Kingdom; United States
- Non-permanent members: Austria; Burkina Faso; Costa Rica; Croatia; Japan; Libya; Mexico; Turkey; Uganda; Vietnam

United Nations Security Council Resolution 1888 was unanimously adopted on 30 September 2009. It was introduced by United States Secretary of State Hillary Clinton, who also presided over the session. The resolution established the United Nations Special Representative on Sexual Violence in Conflict.

== Resolution ==
The Security Council resolution specifically mandates peacekeeping missions to protect women and children from rampant sexual violence during armed conflict, and requested the Secretary-General to appoint a special representative to coordinate a range of mechanisms to fight the crimes.

Secretary of State Hillary Clinton of the United States, which holds the September Presidency of the 15-member body, United Nations Secretary-General Ban Ki-moon, national ministers, and other representatives of Council members praised the unanimous adoption of resolution 1888 (2009) as a substantial step forward on many fronts.

Among other measures, the resolution called on the Secretary-General to rapidly deploy a team of experts to situations of particular concern in terms of sexual violence, to work with United Nations personnel on the ground and national Governments on strengthening the rule of law.

By other terms of the text, the Council affirmed that it would consider the prevalence of rape and other forms of sexual violence when imposing or renewing targeted sanctions in situations of armed conflict.

To enhance the effectiveness of measures for the protection of women and children by peacekeeping missions, the Council decided to identify women’s protection advisers among gender advisers and human rights protection units. Other provisions of the text included the strengthening of monitoring and reporting on sexual violence, the retraining of peacekeepers, national forces and police, and calls to boost the participation of women in peacebuilding and other post-conflict processes.

== See also ==
- List of United Nations Security Council Resolutions 1801 to 1900 (2008–2009)
- United Nations Security Council Resolution 1325
