= United Nations Security Council Resolution 1820 =

UN Security Council Resolution 1820
- Date: 19 June 2008
- Meeting no.: 5,916
- Code: S/RES/1820 (Document)
- Subject: Women and peace and security
- Voting summary: 15 voted for; None voted against; None abstained
- Result: Adopted

Security Council composition
- Permanent members: China; France; Russia; United Kingdom; United States
- Non-permanent members: Burkina Faso; Belgium; Costa Rica; Croatia; Indonesia; Italy; Libya; Panama; South Africa; Vietnam

United Nations Security Council Resolution 1820 was unanimously adopted on 19 June 2008. It condemns the use of sexual violence as a tool of war, and declares that “rape and other forms of sexual violence can constitute war crimes, crimes against humanity or a constitutive act with respect to genocide”. The adoption of the resolution marked the first time that the UN explicitly linked sexual violence as a tactic of war with women, peace, and security issues. Security Council Resolution 1820 reinforces United Nations Security Council Resolution 1325 and highlights that sexual violence in conflict constitutes a war crime and demands parties to armed conflict to immediately take appropriate measures to protect civilians from sexual violence, including training troops and enforcing disciplinary measures. In November 2010, the UN Secretary General presented a report on the implementation of UNSCR 1820.

== Resolution ==
According to a press release by the United Nations Security Council on 19 June 2008,

The Security Council today demanded the “immediate and complete cessation by all parties to armed conflict of all acts of sexual violence against civilians,” expressing its deep concern that, despite repeated condemnation, violence and sexual abuse of women and children trapped in war zones was not only continuing, but, in some cases, had become so widespread and systematic as to “reach appalling levels of brutality”.

Capping a day-long ministerial-level meeting on “women, peace and security”, the 15-member Council unanimously adopted resolution 1820 (2008), which noted that “rape and other forms of sexual violence can constitute war crimes, crimes against humanity or a constitutive act with respect to genocide”. It also affirmed the Council’s intention, when establishing and renewing State-specific sanction regimes, to consider imposing “targeted and graduated” measures against warring factions who committed rape and other forms of violence against women and girls.

The resolution also noted that women and girls are particularly targeted by the use of sexual violence, including in some cases as “a tactic of war to humiliate, dominate, instil fear in, disperse and/or forcibly relocate civilian members of a community or ethnic group”. Stressing that such violence could significantly exacerbate conflicts and impede peace processes, the text affirmed the Council’s readiness to, where necessary, adopt steps to address systematic sexual violence deliberately targeting civilians, or as a part of a widespread campaign against civilian populations.

Further to the text, the Council demanded that all parties to armed conflict take immediate and appropriate measures to protect civilians, including by, among others, enforcing appropriate military disciplinary measures and upholding the principle of command responsibility; training troops on the categorical prohibition of all forms of sexual violence against civilians; debunking myths that fuel sexual violence; and vetting armed and security forces to take into account past sexual violence.

== See also ==
- List of United Nations Security Council Resolutions 1801 to 1900 (2008–2009)
