= United Nations Security Council Resolution 1889 =

UN Security Council Resolution 1889
- Date: 5 October 2009
- Meeting no.: 6,196
- Code: S/RES/1889 (Document)
- Subject: Women and peace and security
- Voting summary: 15 voted for; None voted against; None abstained
- Result: Adopted

Security Council composition
- Permanent members: China; France; Russia; United Kingdom; United States
- Non-permanent members: Austria; Burkina Faso; Costa Rica; Croatia; Japan; Libya; Mexico; Turkey; Uganda; Vietnam

United Nations Security Council Resolution 1889 was unanimously adopted on 5 October 2009.

== Resolution ==
The Security Council this morning called for a wide range of measures to strengthen the participation of women at all stages of peace processes, focusing on the period after peace agreements have been reached, as it began an intensive day-long discussion on the topic.

Through the unanimous adoption of resolution 1889 (2009), the Council reaffirmed its landmark 2000 resolution 1325 on “women and peace and security”, and condemned continuing sexual violence against women in conflict and post-conflict situations. It urged Member States, United Nations bodies, donors and civil society to ensure that women's protection and empowerment was taken into account during post-conflict needs assessment and planning, and factored into subsequent funding and programming.

It also called on all those involved in the planning for disarmament, demobilization and integration programmes, in particular, to take into account the needs of women and girls associated with armed groups, as well as the needs of their children.

Through the text, the Council requested the Secretary-General to submit a report within 12 months focused on women in post-conflict situations, and to ensure cooperation between the Special Representative of the Secretary-General on Children and Armed Conflict and the Special Representative on sexual violence in armed conflict, whose appointment had been requested by last week's resolution 1888 (2009).

“A cessation of conflict should not result in the marginalization of women and girls, nor their relegation to stereotypical roles,” United Nations Deputy Secretary-General Asha-Rose Migiro said as she opened the discussion on behalf of Secretary-General Ban Ki-moon.

== See also ==
- List of United Nations Security Council Resolutions 1801 to 1900 (2008–2009)
