= List of United Nations Security Council Resolutions 2401 to 2500 =

This is a list of United Nations Security Council Resolutions 2401 to 2500 adopted between 24 February 2018 and 4 December 2019.

Resolution	Date	Vote	Concerns
2401	24 February 2018	15–0–0	Situation in the Middle East (Syrian Civil War)
2402	26 February 2018	15–0–0	Renewing sanctions against Yemen
2403	28 February 2018	Adopted without vote	Date of an election to fill a vacancy in the International Court of Justice
2404	28 February 2018	15–0–0	The situation in Guinea-Bissau
2405	8 March 2018	15–0–0	The situation in Afghanistan
2406	15 March 2018	15–0–0	Reports of the Secretary-General on the Sudan and South Sudan
2407	21 March 2018	15–0–0	Non-proliferation/Democratic People's Republic of Korea
2408	27 March 2018	15–0–0	The situation in Somalia
2409	27 March 2018	15–0–0	The situation concerning the Democratic Republic of the Congo
2410	10 April 2018	13–0–2 (abstentions: China and Russian Federation)	The question concerning Haiti (MINUJUSTH)
2411	13 April 2018	15–0–0	Reports of the Secretary-General on the Sudan and South Sudan
2412	23 April 2018	15–0–0	Reports of the Secretary-General on the Sudan and South Sudan
2413	26 April 2018	15–0–0	Post-conflict peacebuilding
2414	27 April 2018	12–0–3 (abstentions: China, Ethiopia, Russian Federation)	The situation concerning Western Sahara
2415	15 May 2018	15–0–0	The situation in Somalia
2416	15 May 2018	15–0–0	Reports of the Secretary-General on the Sudan and South Sudan
2417	24 May 2018	15–0–0	Protection of civilians in armed conflict
2418	31 May 2018	9–0–6 (abstentions: Bolivia, China, Equatorial Guinea, Ethiopia, Kazakhstan, Russian Federation)	Reports of the Secretary-General on the Sudan and South Sudan
2419	6 June 2018	15–0–0	Maintenance of international peace and security
2420	11 June 2018	15–0–0	The situation in Libya
2421	14 June 2018	15–0–0	The situation concerning Iraq
2422	27 June 2018	14–0–1 (abstention: Russian Federation)	International Residual Mechanism for Criminal Tribunals
2423	28 June 2018	15–0–0	The situation in Mali
2424	29 June 2018	15–0–0	The situation concerning the Democratic Republic of the Congo
2425	29 June 2018	15–0–0	Reports of the Secretary-General on the Sudan and South Sudan
2426	29 June 2018	15–0–0	The situation in the Middle East
2427	9 July 2018	15–0–0	Children and armed conflict
2428	13 July 2018	9–0–6 (abstentions: Bolivia, China, Equatorial Guinea, Ethiopia, Kazakhstan, Russian Federation)	Reports of the Secretary-General on the Sudan and South Sudan
2429	13 July 2018	15–0–0	Reports of the Secretary-General on the Sudan and South Sudan
2430	26 July 2018	15–0–0	Renewal of the UNFICYP mandate until 31 January 2019 (Situation in Cyprus)
2431	30 July 2018	15–0–0	Renewal of the AMISOM mandate until 31 May 2019
2432	30 August 2018	15–0–0	The situation in Mali
2433	30 August 2018	15–0–0	Extends mandate of the United Nations Interim Force in Lebanon
2434	13 September 2018	15–0–0	Extends mandate of the United Nations Support Mission in Libya
2435	13 September 2018	15–0–0	Extends mandate of the United Nations Verification Mission in Colombia
2436	21 September 2018	15–0–0	United Nations peacekeeping operations
2437	3 October 2018	15–0–0	Maintenance of international peace and security
2438	11 October 2018	15–0–0	Reports of the Secretary-General on the Sudan and South Sudan
2439	30 October 2018	15–0–0	The situation concerning the Democratic Republic of the Congo
2440	31 October 2018	12–0–3 (abstentions: Bolivia, Ethiopia, Russian Federation)	The situation in Western Sahara
2441	5 November 2018	13–0–2 (abstentions: China and Russian Federation)	The situation in Libya
2442	6 November 2018	15–0–0	The situation in Somalia
2443	6 November 2018	15–0–0	The situation in Bosnia and Herzegovina
2444	14 November 2018	15–0–0	The situation in Somalia
2445	15 November 2018	15–0–0	Reports of the Secretary-General on the Sudan and South Sudan
2446	15 November 2018	15–0–0	Extends mandate of the United Nations Multidimensional Integrated Stabilization Mission in the Central African Republic
2447	13 December 2018	15–0–0	United Nations peacekeeping operations
2448	13 December 2018	13–0–2 (abstentions: China and Russian Federation)	The situation in the Central African Republic
2449	13 December 2018	13–0–2 (abstentions: China and Russian Federation)	The situation in the Middle East
2450	21 December 2018	15–0–0	Extends mandate of the United Nations Disengagement Observer Force
2451	21 December 2018	15–0–0	The situation in the Middle East
2452	16 January 2019	15–0–0	Establishing the United Nations Mission to support the Hodeidah Agreement
2453	30 January 2019	15–0–0	The situation in Cyprus
2454	31 January 2019	15–0–0	The situation in the Central African Republic
2455	7 February 2019	15–0–0	Reports of the Secretary-General on the Sudan and South Sudan
2456	26 February 2019	15–0–0	The situation in Yemen
2457	27 February 2019	15–0–0	Cooperation between the United Nations and regional and sub-regional organizations in maintaining international peace and security
2458	28 February 2019	15–0–0	The situation in Guinea-Bissau
2459	15 March 2019	14–0–1 (abstention: Russian Federation)	Reports of the Secretary-General on the Sudan and South Sudan
2460	15 March 2019	15–0–0	The situation in Afghanistan
2461	27 March 2019	15–0–0	The situation in Somalia
2462	28 March 2019	15–0–0	Threats to international peace and security caused by terrorist acts
2463	29 March 2019	15–0–0	The situation concerning the Democratic Republic of the Congo
2464	10 April 2019	15–0–0	Non-proliferation/Democratic People's Republic of Korea
2465	12 April 2019	15–0–0	Reports of the Secretary-General on the Sudan and South Sudan
2466	12 April 2019	13–0–2 (abstentions: Dominican Republic and Russian Federation)	The question concerning Haiti
2467	23 April 2019	13–0–2 (abstentions: China and Russian Federation)	Women and peace and security
2468	30 April 2019	13–0–2 (abstentions: Russian Federation and South Africa)	The situation concerning Western Sahara
2469	14 May 2019	15–0–0	Reports of the Secretary-General on the Sudan and South Sudan
2470	21 May 2019	15–0–0	The situation in Iraq
2471	31 May 2019	10–0–5 (abstentions: China, Côte d'Ivoire, Equatorial Guinea, Russian Federation, South Africa)	Reports of the Secretary-General on the Sudan and South Sudan
2472	31 May 2019	15–0–0	The situation in Somalia
2473	10 June 2019	15–0–0	The situation in Libya
2474	11 June 2019	15–0–0	Protection of civilians in armed conflict - Missing persons in armed conflict.
2475	20 June 2019	15–0–0	Protection of civilians in armed conflict
2476	25 June 2019	13–0–2 (abstentions: China and Dominican Republic)	The question concerning Haiti
2477	26 June 2019	15–0–0	The situation in the Middle East
2478	26 June 2019	15–0–0	The situation concerning the Democratic Republic of the Congo
2479	27 June 2019	15–0–0	Reports of the Secretary-General on the Sudan and South Sudan
2480	28 June 2019	15–0–0	The situation in Mali
2481	15 July 2019	15–0–0	The situation in the Middle East
2482	19 July 2019	15–0–0	Threats to international peace and security
2483	25 July 2019	15–0–0	The situation in Cyprus
2484	29 August 2019	15–0–0	The situation in Mali
2485	29 August 2019	15–0–0	The situation in the Middle East
2486	12 September 2019	15–0–0	The situation in Libya
2487	12 September 2019	15–0–0	Extends Mandate of the United Nations Verification Mission in Colombia
2488	12 September 2019	15–0–0	The situation in the Central African Republic
2489	17 September 2019	15–0–0	The situation in Afghanistan
2490	20 September 2019	15–0–0	Threats to international peace and security
2491	3 October 2019	15–0–0	Maintenance of international peace and security
2492	15 October 2019	15–0–0	Reports of the Secretary-General on the Sudan and South Sudan
2493	29 October 2019	15–0–0	Women and peace and security
2494	30 October 2019	13–0–2 (abstentions: Russian Federation and South Africa)	The situation concerning Western Sahara
2495	31 October 2019	15–0–0	Reports of the Secretary-General on the Sudan and South Sudan
2496	5 November 2019	15–0–0	The situation in Bosnia and Herzegovina
2497	14 November 2019	15–0–0	Reports of the Secretary-General on the Sudan and South Sudan
2498	15 November 2019	12–0–3 (abstentions: China, Equatorial Guinea, Russian Federation)	The situation in Somalia
2499	15 November 2019	15–0–0	Extends mandate of the United Nations Multidimensional Integrated Stabilization Mission in the Central African Republic
2500	4 December 2019	15–0–0	The situation in Somalia

== See also ==
- Lists of United Nations Security Council resolutions
- List of United Nations Security Council Resolutions 2301 to 2400
- List of United Nations Security Council Resolutions 2501 to 2600
