= United Nations Security Council Resolution 251 =

UN Security Council Resolution 251
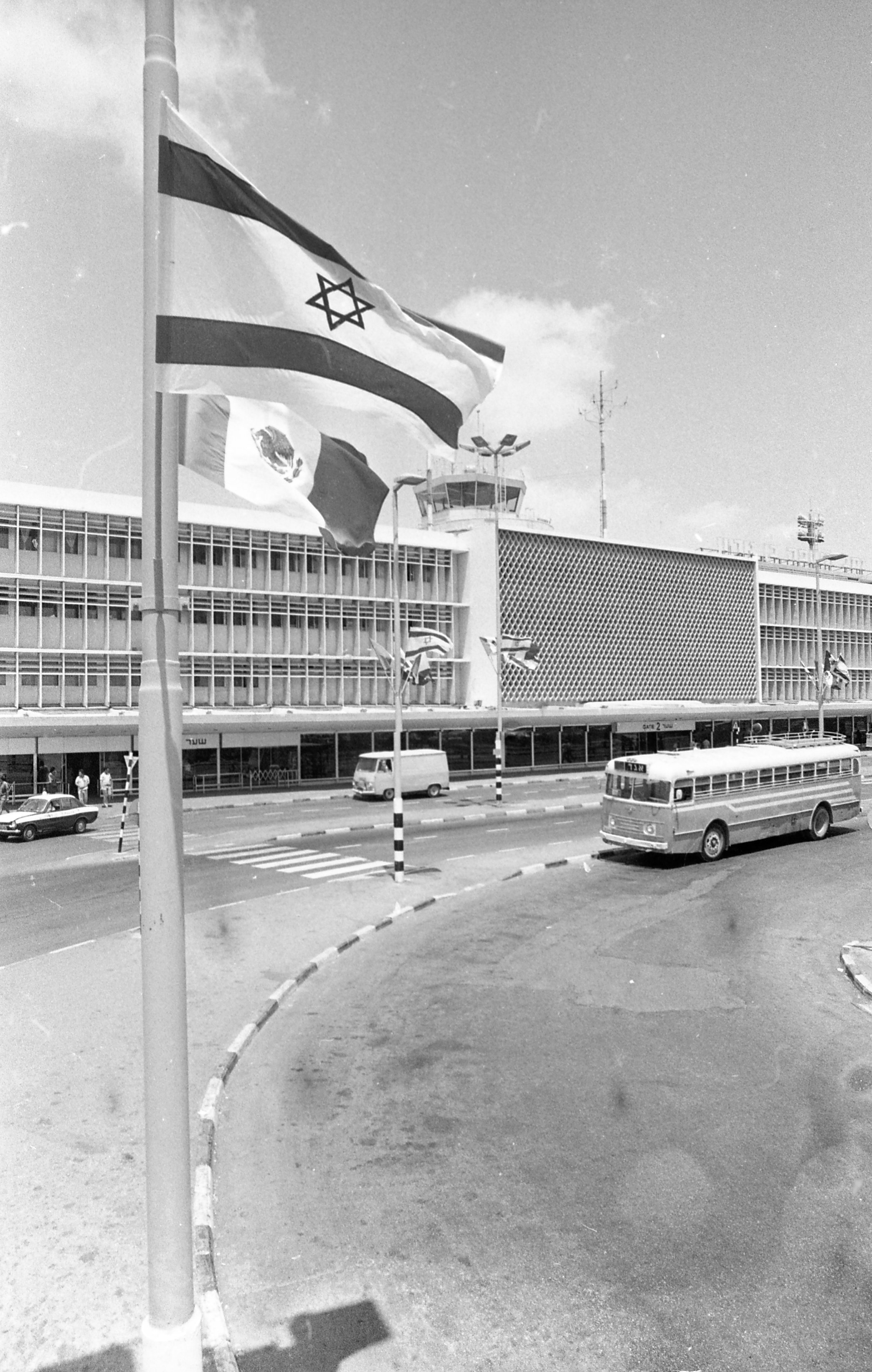
- Israel flag
- Date: May 2 1968
- Meeting no.: 1420
- Code: S/RES/251 (Document)
- Subject: The Situation in the Middle East
- Voting summary: 15 voted for; None voted against; None abstained
- Result: Adopted

Security Council composition
- Permanent members: China; France; Soviet Union; United Kingdom; United States
- Non-permanent members: Algeria; Brazil; Canada; Denmark; Ethiopia; Hungary; India; Pakistan; Paraguay; Senegal

United Nations Security Council Resolution 251, adopted unanimously on May 2, 1968, the Council deeply deplored Israel holding a military parade in Jerusalem in disregard of the unanimous decision adopted by the Council in resolution 250.

== See also ==
- Arab–Israeli conflict
- List of United Nations Security Council Resolutions 201 to 300 (1965–1971)
