= United Nations Security Council Resolution 494 =

UN Security Council Resolution 494
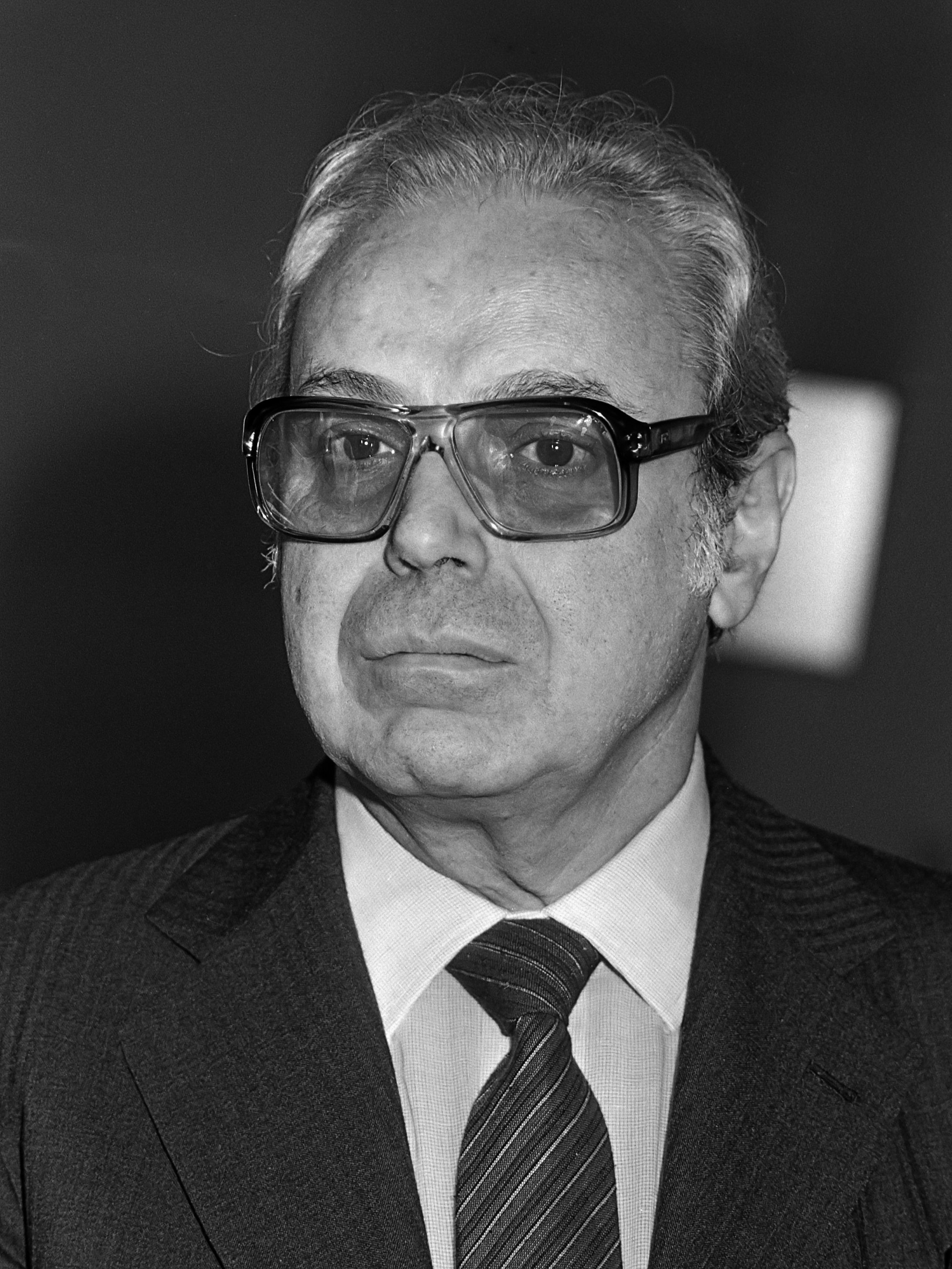
- Javier Pérez de Cuéllar
- Date: 11 December 1981
- Meeting no.: 2,312
- Code: S/RES/494 (Document)
- Subject: Recommendation regarding the appointment of the Secretary-General
- Voting summary: 15 voted for; None voted against; None abstained
- Result: Adopted

Security Council composition
- Permanent members: China; France; Soviet Union; United Kingdom; United States
- Non-permanent members: East Germany; Ireland; Japan; Mexico; Niger; Panama; Philippines; Spain; Tunisia; Uganda

United Nations Security Council Resolution 494, adopted on 11 December 1981, having considered the question of the recommendation for the appointment of the Secretary-General of the United Nations, the council recommended to the General Assembly the Mr. Javier Pérez de Cuéllar be appointed for a five-year term from 1 January 1982, to 31 December 1986.

The resolution was adopted unanimously by the council.

== See also ==
- List of United Nations Security Council Resolutions 401 to 500 (1976–1982)
- United Nations Security Council Resolution 589
