= List of United Nations resolutions concerning Syria =

The United Nations resolutions concerning Syria have mainly dealt with the Arab–Israeli conflict, Syrian occupation of Lebanon and the Syrian Civil War.

== Security Council Resolutions ==
| Resolution | Date | Vote | Concerns |
|---|---|---|---|
| 242 | 22 November 1967 | Unanimous | This was a British sponsored compromise between the three-power and US drafts, calling on all parties to end territorial claims, respect sovereignty, and for Israel to withdraw from occupied territories. This resolution affirmed that the establishment of just and lasting peace in the Middle East should include the application of certain principles inter alia. |
| 338 | 22 October 1973 | 14-0-1 | This resolution decided that, concurrently with a ceasefire, peace negotiations should start in the context of the 1973 Arab-Israeli War. |
| 350 | 31 May 1974 | 13-0-2 | This resolution established UNDOF. |
| 497 | 17 December 1981 | Unanimous | This resolution nullified Israeli annexation of the Golan Heights. |
| 887 | 29 November 1993 | Unanimous | United Nations Disengagement Observer Force Zone |
| 962 | 29 November 1994 | Unanimous | United Nations Disengagement Observer Force Zone |
| 1276 | 24 November 1999 | Unanimous | This resolution called upon the parties concerned to implement immediately its resolution 338 (1973). |
| 1578 | 15 December 2004 | Unanimous | This resolution extended the mandate of UNDOF until 30 June 2005. |
| 1595 | 7 April 2005 | Unanimous | Syrian occupation of Lebanon |
| 1605 | 17 June 2005 | Unanimous | This resolution extended the mandate of UNDOF until 31 December 2005. |
| 1636 | 31 October 2005 | Unanimous | Assassination of former Lebanese Prime Minister Rafic Hariri |
| 2042 | 14 April 2012 | Unanimous | The Syrian Civil War observer force resolution |
| 2043 | 21 April 2012 | Unanimous | Establishes of the United Nations Supervision Mission in Syria |
| 2059 | 20 July 2012 | Unanimous | Renews mandate of Syrian Observer Mission for 30 days. |
| 2118 | 27 September 2013 | Unanimous | Syrian civil war, Framework for Elimination of Syrian Chemical Weapons. |
| 2139 | February 22, 2014 | Unanimous | Syrian civil war, access for humanitarian aid. |
| 2165 | 14 July 2014 | Unanimous | Syrian civil war, Humanitarian situation in Syria and the establishment of a monitoring mechanism |
| 2209 | 6 March 2015 | 14–0–1 (abstentions; Venezuela) | Syrian civil war, Chemical weapons in Syria |
| 2254 | 18 December 2015 | Unanimous | Syrian civil war, Cease fire |
| 2268 | 26 February 2016 | Unanimous | calling for a cessation of hostilities and a grant for access to humanitarian workers in Syria. |
| 2314 | 31 October 2016 | Unanimous | Extends Mandate of the OPCW-UN Joint Investigative Mechanism to Identify Perpetrators of Chemical Weapons Use in Syria. |
| 2319 | 17 November 2016 | Unanimous | Renewed the mandate of the OPCW-UN Joint Investigative Mechanism for a further year. |
| 2328 | 19 December 2016 | Unanimous | Demanding Immediate, Unhindered Access for Observation of Monitoring Civilian Evacuations from Aleppo, Syria. |
| 2332 | 21 December 2016 | Unanimous | Renewed the authorisation for cross-border aid delivery in Syria until 10 January 2018. |
| 2336 | 31 December 2016 | Unanimous | Calls on all the parties to allow humanitarian agencies rapid, safe and unhindered access throughout Syria. |
| 2393 | 19 December 2017 | Unanimous | Calls on all parties for a ceasefire, to not hinder humanitarian aid, calling an end to human rights abuses and a concern to the amount of terrorists moving out from- and into Syria |
| 2401 | 24 February 2018 | Unanimous | Calls for a nationwide ceasefire in Syria for 30 days starting from 24 February 2018. |
| 2449 | 13 December 2018 | Unanimous | Renewing the authorisation for cross-border and cross-line humanitarian access to Syria. |
| 2533 | 11 July 2020 | Unanimous | Humanitarian situation in Syria |

== General Assembly Resolutions ==
| Resolution | Date | Sponsors | Vote | For | Abstain | Against | Absent | Concerns |
|---|---|---|---|---|---|---|---|---|
| A/RES/72/191 "Situation of Human Rights in the Syrian Arab Republic" | December 19, 2017 | Japan, Qatar, Saudi Arabia, Ukraine, USA | 109-58-17 | For: Albania; Andorra; Antigua and Barbuda; Argentina; Australia; Austria; Bahamas; Bahrain; Barbados; Belgium; Belize; Botswana; Brazil; Bulgaria; Burkina Faso; Cabo Verde; Cameroon; Canada; Central African Republic; Chad; Chile; Colombia; Comoros; Costa Rica; Ivory Coast; Croatia; Cyprus; Czech Republic; Denmark; Djibouti; El Salvador; Estonia; Finland; France; Gambia; Georgia; Germany; Greece; Guatemala; Haiti; Honduras; Hungary; Iceland; Israel; Ireland; Jamaica; Japan; Jordan; Kuwait; Latvia; Liberia; Liechtenstein; Lithuania; Luxembourg; Macedonia; Malawi; Malaysia; Maldives; Malta; Marshall Islands; Mauritania; Mexico; Moldova; Monaco; Montenegro; Morocco; Nauru; Netherlands; New Zealand; Norway; Palau; Panama; Papua New Guinea; Peru; Poland; Portugal; Qatar; Romania; St. Kitts and Nevis; St. Lucia; Samoa; San Marino; Saudi Arabia; Senegal; Seychelles; Sierra Leone; Slovakia; Slovenia; Solomon Islands; Somalia; South Korea; Spain; Sri Lanka; Sweden; Switzerland; Thailand; Timor-Leste; Togo; Turkey; Tuvalu; Ukraine; UAE; UK; USA; Uruguay; Vanuatu; Yemen | Abstain: Angola; Armenia; Bangladesh; Benin; Bhutan; Bosnia and Herzegovina; Brunei; Cambodia; Republic of the Congo; Democratic Republic of the Congo; Dominican Republic; Ecuador; Egypt; Equatorial Guinea; Eritrea; Ethiopia; Fiji; Gabon; Ghana; Guinea; Guinea-Bissau; Guyana; India; Indonesia; Kazakhstan; Kenya; Kiribati; Kyrgyzstan; Laos; Lebanon; Lesotho; Madagascar; Mali; Mauritius; Mongolia; Mozambique; Namibia; Nepal; Niger; Nigeria; Oman; Pakistan; Paraguay; Rwanda; St. Vincent and the Grenadines; Singapore; South Africa; Sudan; Suriname; Tajikistan; Tanzania; Tonga; Trinidad and Tobago; Tunisia; Turkmenistan; Uganda; Vietnam; Zambia | Against: Algeria; Belarus; Bolivia; Burundi; China; Cuba; Iran; Iraq; Myanmar; Nicaragua; North Korea; Philippines; Russia; Syria; Uzbekistan; Venezuela; Zimbabwe | Absent: Afghanistan; Azerbaijan; Dominica; Grenada; Libya; Sao Tome and Principe; Serbia; South Sudan; Swaziland | |

== See also ==
- Vetoed UN resolutions on Syria
- Syrian conflict peace proposals
- List of Middle East peace proposals
- Authorization for the Use of Military Force Against the Government of Syria to Respond to Use of Chemical Weapons (S.J.Res 21) - September 2013 - Proposed United States resolution to authorize the President of the United States to intervene militarily in Syria in response to alleged chemical weapons attacks.
