= United Nations Security Council Resolution 589 =

United Nations Security Council resolution

UN Security Council Resolution 589
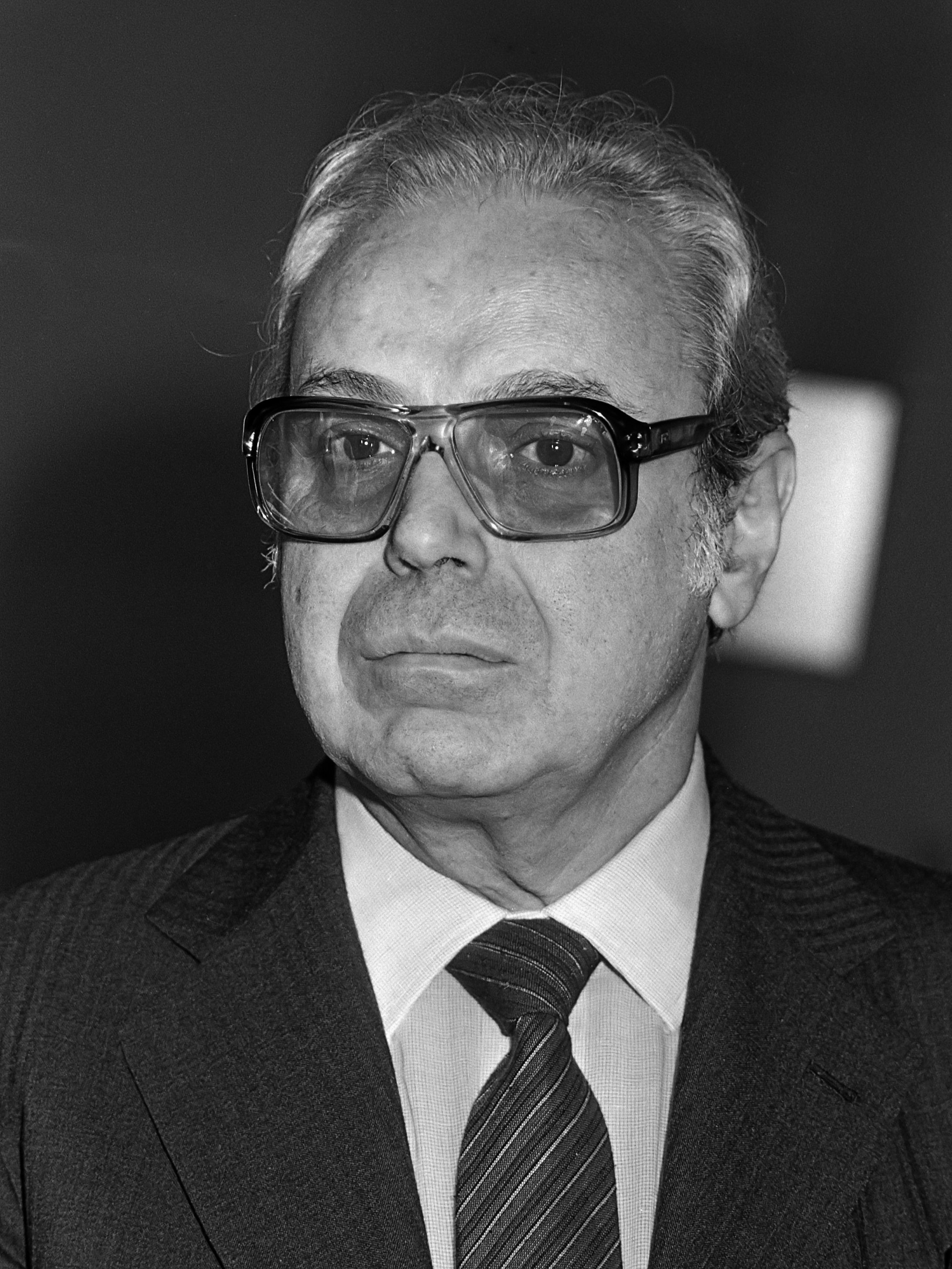
- Javier Pérez de Cuéllar
- Date: 10 October 1986
- Meeting no.: 2,714
- Code: S/RES/589 (Document)
- Subject: Recommendation regarding the appointment of the Secretary-General
- Voting summary: 15 voted for; None voted against; None abstained
- Result: Adopted

Security Council composition
- Permanent members: China; France; Soviet Union; United Kingdom; United States
- Non-permanent members: Australia; Bulgaria; Congo; Denmark; Ghana; Madagascar; Thailand; Trinidad and Tobago; United Arab Emirates; Venezuela

United Nations Security Council Resolution 589, adopted unanimously at a closed meeting on 10 October 1986, having considered the question of the recommendation for the appointment of the Secretary-General of the United Nations, the council recommended to the General Assembly the Mr. Javier Pérez de Cuéllar be appointed for a second five-year term from 1 January 1987, to 31 December 1991.

The resolution was adopted unanimously by the council.

== See also ==
- List of United Nations Security Council Resolutions 501 to 600 (1982–1987)
- United Nations Security Council Resolution 494
