= United Nations Security Council Resolution 250 =

UN Security Council Resolution 250
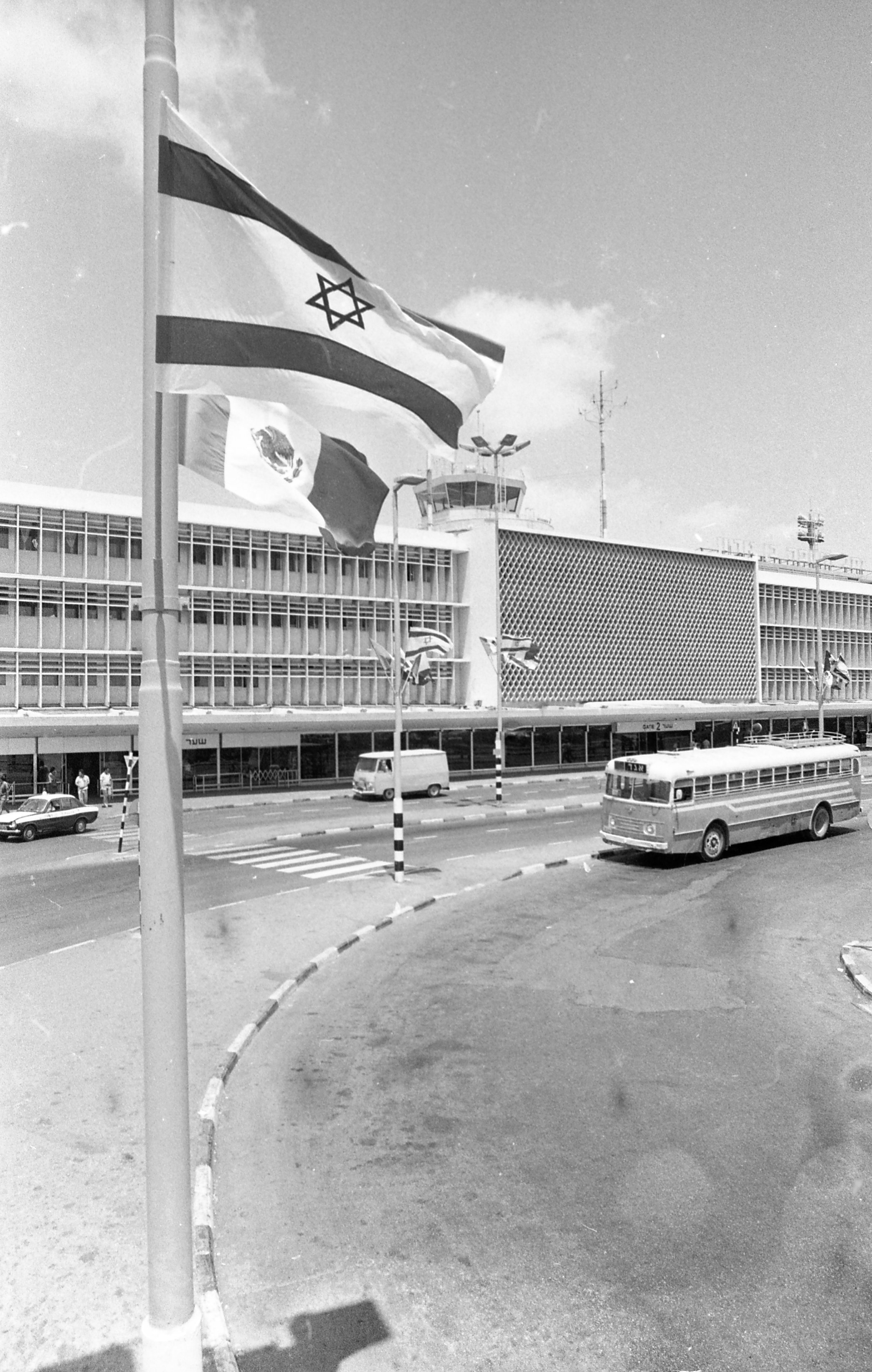
- Israel flag
- Date: April 27 1968
- Meeting no.: 1417
- Code: S/RES/250 (Document)
- Subject: The Situation in the Middle East
- Voting summary: 15 voted for; None voted against; None abstained
- Result: Adopted

Security Council composition
- Permanent members: China; France; Soviet Union; United Kingdom; United States
- Non-permanent members: Algeria; Brazil; Canada; Denmark; Ethiopia; Hungary; India; Pakistan; Paraguay; Senegal

United Nations Security Council Resolution 250, adopted unanimously on April 27, 1968, warned Israel against holding an Independence Day Parade in Jerusalem, Israel's proclaimed capital. Israel ignored the resolution. In response, the Council passed UNSC resolution 251 condemning Israel's actions.

== See also ==
- Arab–Israeli conflict
- List of United Nations Security Council Resolutions 201 to 300 (1965–1971)
