= United Nations Security Council Resolution 2410 =

United Nations Security Council Resolution

UN Security Council Resolution 2410
- UN emblem
- Date: 10 April 2018
- Meeting no.: 8,226
- Code: S/RES/2410 (Document)
- Subject: The question concerning Haiti
- Voting summary: 13 voted for; None voted against; 2 abstained
- Result: Adopted

Security Council composition
- Permanent members: China; France; Russia; United Kingdom; United States
- Non-permanent members: Bolivia; Côte d'Ivoire; Equatorial Guinea; Ethiopia; Kazakhstan; Kuwait; Netherlands; Peru; Poland; Sweden

United Nations Security Council Resolution 2410 was adopted on 10 April 2018. According to the resolution, the Security Council voted to extend the mandate of UN Mission for Justice Support in Haiti (MINUJUSTH) until 15 April 2019.

Thirteen members of the Council voted in favor, while China and Russia abstained.

== See also ==
- List of United Nations Security Council Resolutions 2401 to 2500 (2018–2019)
