= United Nations Security Council Resolution 2500 =

UN Security Council Resolution 2500
- UN emblem
- Date: 4 December 2019
- Meeting no.: 8,678
- Code: S/RES/2500 (Document)
- Subject: Somalia
- Voting summary: 15 voted for; None voted against; None abstained
- Result: Adopted

Security Council composition
- Permanent members: China; France; Russia; United Kingdom; United States
- Non-permanent members: Belgium; Côte d'Ivoire; Dominican Republic; Equatorial Guinea; Germany; Indonesia; Kuwait; Peru; Poland; South Africa

United Nations Security Council resolution 2500 "on piracy and armed robbery at sea off the coast of Somalia" was adopted in 2019.

== See also ==
- List of United Nations Security Council Resolutions 2401 to 2500 (2018–2019)
