= 2013 Nobel Peace Prize =

The 2013 Nobel Peace Prize
- Organisation for the Prohibition of Chemical Weapons (OPCW)
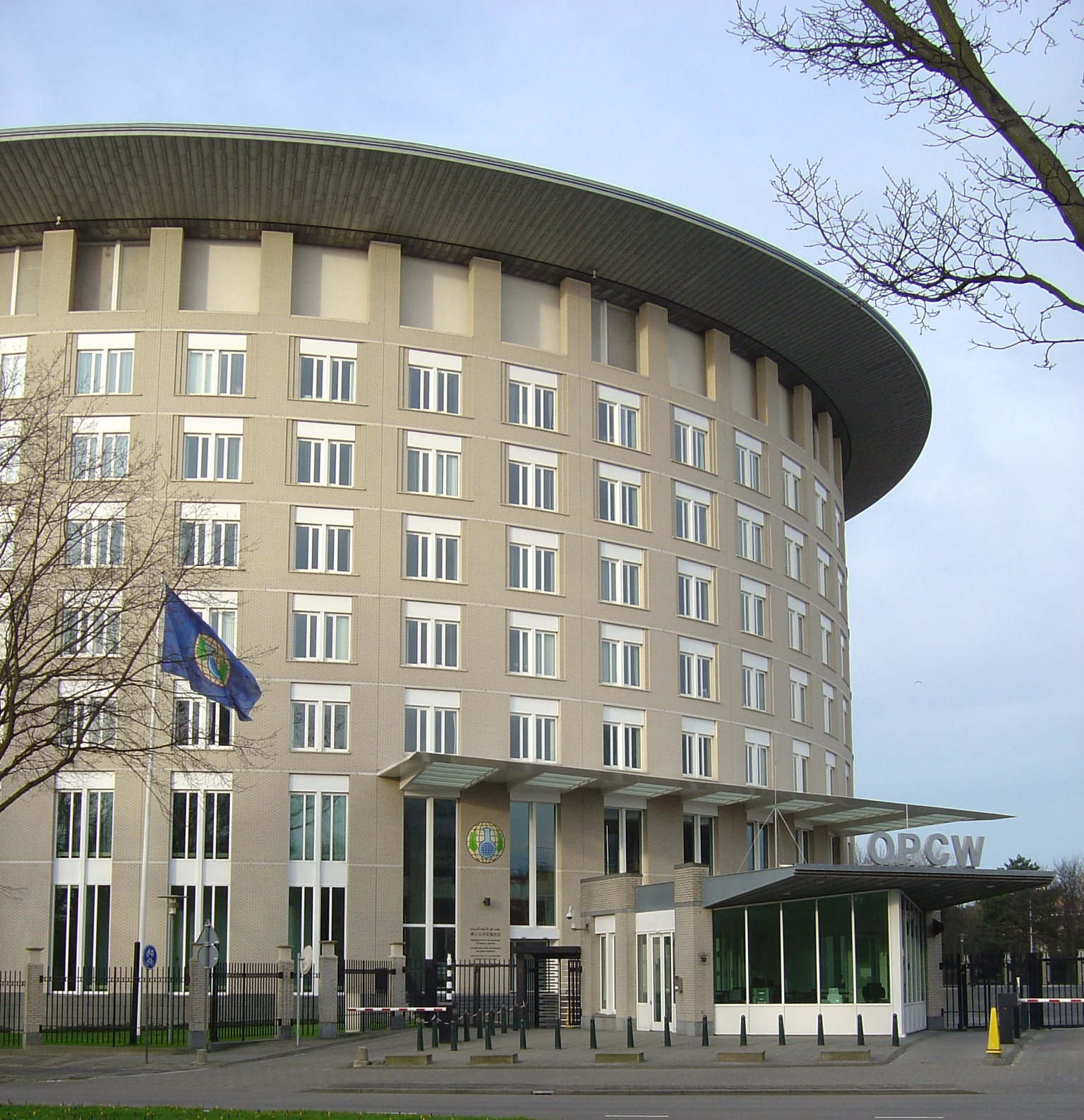
- "for its extensive efforts to eliminate chemical weapons."
- Date: 11 October 2013 (announcement by Thorbjørn Jagland); 10 December 2013 (ceremony)
- Location: Oslo, Norway
- Presented by: Norwegian Nobel Committee
- Rewards: 8 million SEK ($1.25M, €0.9M)
- First award: 1901
- Website: Official website

The 2013 Nobel Peace Prize was awarded to the Organisation for the Prohibition of Chemical Weapons (founded in 1997) for their "extensive work to eliminate chemical weapons". The award citation indicated the organization was awarded the prize, because they "have defined the use of chemical weapons as taboo under international law. Recent events in Syria, where chemical weapons have again been put to use, have underlined the need to enhance the efforts to do away with such weapons." The committee criticized Russia and the United States for not meeting the extended deadline for destruction of its chemical weapons, and noted that certain countries "are still not members". The OPCW was the 22nd organization to be awarded the prize.

== Nomination ==
The Norwegian Nobel Committee announced on 4 March 2013, it had received 259 nominations for the prize. This was the highest number of nominations ever: 18 more than the previous record year 2011. Of those 259 nominations, 50 were for organizations.

== Announcement ==
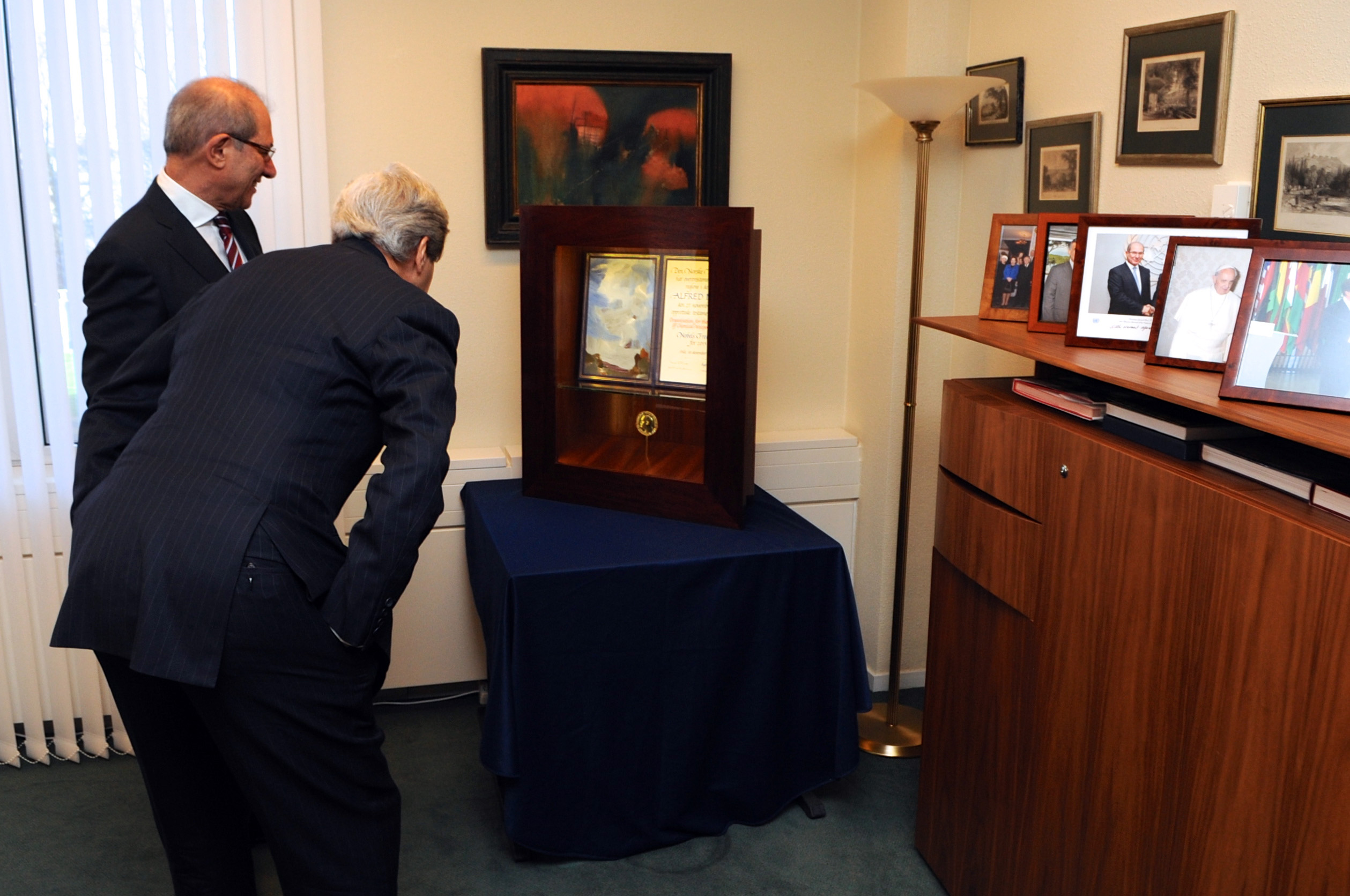
OPCW Director-General Ahmet Üzümcü shows U.S. Secretary John Kerry the Organization's Nobel Peace Prize, 24 March 2014.

The winner of the Award was announced on 11 October 2013. The press release indicated that the OPCW was awarded the prize for "its extensive efforts to eliminate chemical weapons". The announcement further reiterated the development of the Chemical Weapons Convention, which establishes the OPCW, as well as earlier instruments such as the Geneva Convention of 1925, but also indicated the use of chemical weapons during World War II and afterwards "by both states and terrorists".

The use of chemical weapons in Syria was also mentioned as a recent event underscoring the importance of elimination of chemical weapons. The OPCW contributed to the UN mission investigating the use of chemical weapons in Ghouta and its activities since 1 October entailed supervision of destruction activities, which followed the accession of Syria to the Chemical Weapons Convention (and its provisional application), OPCW Executive Council Decision EC-M-33/DEC.1. and was mandated via the United Nations Security Council Resolution 2118.

The Nobel Committee was critical towards Russia and the United States for not meeting their extended deadlines for the full destruction of its chemical weapons in 2012, and mentioned that some states "are still not members". Non-member states of the OPCW are the states which are not party to the Chemical Weapons Convention: Angola, Egypt, Israel, Myanmar, North Korea and South Sudan.

== Committee ==
The Nobel Peace Prize is awarded by the Norwegian Nobel Committee. For the 2013 award, the members were:

- Thorbjørn Jagland (chair, born 1950), former President of the Storting and former Prime Minister
- Kaci Kullmann Five (deputy chair, born 1951), former member of Parliament and cabinet minister.
- Inger-Marie Ytterhorn (1941–2021), member of Parliament.
- Berit Reiss-Andersen (born 1954), former state secretary for the Minister of Justice and the Police.
- Gunnar Stålsett (born 1935), former bishop of Oslo.

== Organisation for the Prohibition of Chemical Weapons ==
Members of the OPCW Members Non-Members

The Organisation for the Prohibition of Chemical Weapons (OPCW) is an intergovernmental organisation, located in The Hague, Netherlands. The organisation promotes and verifies the adherence to the Chemical Weapons Convention which prohibits the use of chemical weapons and requires their destruction. The organization was established on 29 April 1997, upon the entry into force of the Chemical Weapons Convention. The verification consists both of evaluation of declarations by member states and on-site inspections. The principal body of the organization is the "conference of states parties", which normally is convened yearly. The Executive Council is the executive organ of the organisation and consists of 41 States Parties. The "Technical Secretariat" applies most of the activities mandated by the Council and is the body where most of the employees of the organisation work. Ahmet Üzümcü is Director-General of the OPCW.

All 190 parties to the Chemical Weapons Convention are automatically members of the OPCW. Non-members are Israel and Myanmar, which are signatory states that have not ratified the Chemical Weapons Convention, and Angola, Egypt, North Korea and South Sudan, which have neither signed nor acceded to the Chemical Weapons Convention.

== Reaction ==
OPCW Director-General Ahmet Üzümcü told reporters that he hoped his organisation's work would help "to achieve peace in that country [Syria] and end the suffering of its people."

United Nations Secretary General Ban Ki-moon congratulated the organisation's work.

USA Today quoted a London-based Syrian opposition activist who doubted Syrian people would be celebrating the award. Similarly, a spokesperson for the Syrian National Coalition labelled the prize "ironic".

Pakistani politician Imran Khan called on the US and Russia to destroy their own chemical weapons.
