= United Nations Security Council Resolution 2118 =

United Nations Security Council resolution

UN Security Council Resolution 2118
- Date: 27 September 2013
- Meeting no.: 7038
- Code: S/RES/2117 (Document)
- Subject: Agreement to eliminate Syria's chemical weapons — Syrian civil war
- Voting summary: 15 voted for; None voted against; None abstained
- Result: Adopted

Security Council composition
- Permanent members: China; France; Russia; United Kingdom; United States
- Non-permanent members: Argentina; Australia; Azerbaijan; Guatemala; South Korea; Luxembourg; Morocco; Pakistan; Rwanda; Togo

United Nations Security Council Resolution 2118 was adopted unanimously on 27 September 2013, in regard to the Framework for Elimination of Syrian Chemical Weapons during the Syrian civil war. It recalled United Nations Security Council Resolutions 1540, 2042 and 2043 and occurred on the sidelines of the General debate of the sixty-eighth session of the United Nations General Assembly. Under the Resolution, Syria had until mid-2014 to destroy its chemical weapons arsenal; and the Resolution also outlines plans for a transition. Despite a few hiccups, the OPCW reported that the destruction was largely on schedule.

== Background ==
According to the United Nations, chemical weapons had been used in the Ghouta attacks on 21 August 2013. The Syrian government blamed rebels for the attack and for all other chemical weapons attacks in Syria. In response to the Ghouta events, a coalition of countries led by the United States and France, blamed the Syrian government for the attack and threatened air strikes on Syria as punishment. Russia maintained its opposition to any military action in Syria and blocked Western-led efforts at the United Nations Security Council for UN-sanctioned military intervention.

During the G20 summit on 6 September, Russian President Vladimir Putin and U.S. President Barack Obama discussed the idea of putting Syria's chemical weapons under international control.

On 9 September 2013, U.S. Secretary of State John Kerry suggested that the air strikes could be averted if Syria turned over "every single bit" of its chemical weapons stockpiles within a week, but State Department officials stressed that Kerry's statement and its one-week deadline were rhetorical in light of the unlikelihood of Syria turning over its chemical weapons. However, hours after Kerry's statement, Russian Foreign Minister Sergey Lavrov announced that Russia had suggested to Syria that it relinquish its chemical weapons and Syrian Foreign Minister Walid al-Moallem immediately welcomed the proposal. This then led to the Framework for Elimination of Syrian Chemical Weapons. After Syria ratified the treaty to join the Organisation for the Prohibition of Chemical Weapons (OPCW) and turned over a preliminary set of documents in regard to its chemical weapons stockpile to the OPCW, more discussions and Russian claims that the West was seeking to ensure air strikes would remain an option if the chemical weapons were not turned over, the United Nations Security Council passed resolution 2118.

Prior to the vote, the Executive Council of the OPCW adopted a blueprint with a timeline of verification, removal and destruction of Syria's arsenal of sarin and other chemical weapons by mid-2014 in an "accelerated" programme compared to the regular destruction deadlines under the Chemical Weapons Convention. Director-General Ahmet Üzümcü said: "This decision sends an unmistakable message that the international community is coming together to work for peace in Syria, beginning with the elimination of chemical weapons in that country."

== Resolution ==
During the discussion for the resolution from 20:15 to 21:45 EST, speakers included the Ministers of Foreign Affairs of Russia (Sergey Lavrov), the United States (John Kerry) the United Kingdom (William Hague), Luxembourg (Jean Asselborn), France (Laurent Fabius), Azerbaijan (Elmar Mammadyarov), South Korea (Yun Byung-se), China (Wang Yi), Guatemala (Fernando Carrera), Morocco (Saad-Eddine El Othmani) and Argentina (Héctor Timerman), as well as the Adviser to the Prime Minister on National Security and Foreign Affairs of Pakistan (Sartaj Aziz) and the permanent representatives of Rwanda, Togo and Australia.

After recalling United Nations Security Council Resolutions 1540, 2042 and 2043, the resolution reaffirmed the Security Council′s "strong commitment to the sovereignty, independence and territorial integrity of the Syrian Arab Republic", reaffirmed "that the proliferation of chemical weapons, as well as their means of delivery, constitutes a threat to international peace and security", recalled that Syria had on 22 November 1968 acceded to the 1925 Geneva Protocol, condemned "any use of chemical weapons in the Syrian Arab Republic, in particular the attack on 21 August 2013, in violation of international law", and bound Syria to the implementation plan presented in a decision of the Organisation for the Prohibition of Chemical Weapons (OPCW): Syria had until 30 June 2014 to complete the destruction of its chemical weapons.

The resolution also calls for a "transitional governing body exercising full executive powers, which could include members of the present Government and the opposition and other groups and shall be formed on the basis of mutual consent;" while still claiming the process is "for the Syrian people to determine the future of the country. All groups and segments of society in the Syrian Arab Republic must be enabled to participate in a national dialogue process. That process must be not only inclusive but also meaningful." The steps in this regard include

a review of the constitutional order and the legal system. The result of constitutional drafting would be subject to popular approval; upon establishment of the new constitutional order, it will be necessary to prepare for and conduct free and fair multiparty elections for the new institutions and offices that have been established; women must be fully represented in all aspects of the transition.

It further noted the difficulty of a transition and mentioned that such a transition should be peaceable.

== Issues ==
While enforcement of the resolution was an issue, another problem that arose was dealing with the chemical weapons, as only the U.S. and Russia have the industrial-scale capacity to store and dispose of the chemical weapons. As such Russian Deputy Foreign Minister Sergei Ryabkov announced two days before the resolution that Russia would be willing to offer its assistance in securing the chemical-weapons sites, it would not take possession of any part of the arsenal; since the U.S. bans the importation and transportation of such munitions, the inspectors would have to work inside Syria amid the civil war. Boston University professor William Keylor wrote to Bloomberg:

It is hard to imagine chemical-weapons inspectors, protected by Russian or other troops, engaging in the complicated task of destroying the stockpiles of chemical weapons in the midst of a civil war. If the inspectors or their protectors come under fire from either side, what will the response of the international community be?

== Reactions ==
United Nations

Secretary-General Ban Ki-moon said:

For many months, I have said that the confirmed use of chemical weapons in Syria required a firm, united and decisive response. Tonight, the international community has delivered. A red light for one form of weapons does not mean a green light for others. This is not a license to kill with conventional weapons. All the violence must stop. All the guns must fall silent.

Supranational bodies

The OPCW Executive Council Decision indicated that it would start inspections no later than 1 October and that a plan was approved to eliminate all of Syria's chemical weapons by mid-2014.

States

Domestic

Syrian Foreign Minister Walid Muallem said: "We will commit because we are determined to go forward in the respect of [the agreement of] destroying the chemical weapons." Ambassador to the United Nations Bashar Jaafari also hailed the resolution and added that Syria was "fully committed" to attending the proposed peace conference and that the resolution answered the concerns of Syria and those who supported the opposition - Turkey, Saudi Arabia, Qatar, France and the US - should also abide by it. However, the partisan opposition leader, Ahmad al-Jarba, said that the accord will not "end the suffering in Syria."

Rest of the world

Many states welcomed the resolution in general, while some, like Bahrain, Togo and Denmark, specifically welcomed the resolution at the general debate of the sixty-eighth session of the United Nations General Assembly.

China's Foreign Minister Wang Yi applauded the unanimous resolution and welcomed peace initiatives for the conflict, saying:

This is the first time that the Security Council has taken a joint major action on the Syrian issue in more than one year. In dealing with the Syrian issue, the Security Council must bear in mind the purposes and principles of the UN Charter, act with a sense of responsibility to the Syrian people, the world and history, and ensure that any decision it takes can stand the test of history. We hope that the relevant parties will stay in close cooperation, fulfil their respective responsibilities and implement the OPCW decision and Security Council resolution in a comprehensive and accurate manner so as to eventually achieve a proper settlement of the issue of chemical weapons in Syria.

He added that neither Syria not the region could afford another war.

France's Foreign Minister Laurent Fabius said Syria's cooperation "must be unconditional and fully transparent. This resolution is not our final goal, but only a first step. We must now implement it. One cannot trust a regime, which, until recently, denied possessing such weapons."

Russia's Sergey Lavrov said of the resolution that it "does not allow for any automatic use of force or measures of enforcement" for compliance failures and that the UN Security Council would then have to "carefully" consider any decisions on enforcement. He, however, also said: "The United Nations Security Council ... will stand ready to take action under Chapter VII of the charter, quite clearly."

U.S. Secretary of State John Kerry called on the Syrian government to "give unfettered access" to its stocks of chemical weapons and would face repercussions for its failure to do so. He added:

This resolution makes clear that those responsible for this heinous act must be held accountable. We are here because actions have consequences and now, should the regime fail to act, there will be consequences... Our original objective was to degrade and deter Syria's chemical-weapons capability [and a U.S. attack] could have achieved that. Tonight's resolution accomplishes even more [by moving to eliminate] one of the largest chemical-weapons stockpiles on earth.

His call for access was echoed by British Foreign Secretary William Hague. U.S. Ambassador to the UN Samantha Power said: "This resolution breaks new ground. The Security Council is establishing a new international norm;" while the National Security Advisor Susan Rice said called it "a strong, binding and enforceable UNSC resolution." Skepticism came from Republican Senators John McCain and Lindsey Graham who issued a join statement that read the accord does not change the "reality on the ground" and added: "This resolution is another triumph of hope over reality. It contains no meaningful or immediate enforcement mechanisms, let alone a threat of the use of force for the Assad regime's noncompliance. The whole question of enforcement has been deferred." Prior to the vote the head of the Senate Foreign Relations Committee Robert Menendez was concerned that the vote would shift focus from ending "the barbarism and wanton violence of the Assad regime" [sic] to removing one method of war.

Others

The editor of Russia in Global Affairs, Fyodr Lukyanov, said of the deal that "it was the compromise version;" while the director for Eurasia and the Middle East at the Eurasia Group, Cliff Kupchan, said: "It was predictable in the best way it could be. We're very clear-eyed about this." The associate director of New York University's Center on International Cooperation wrote: "The language of the resolution is less important than Russia's willingness to make Assad [sic] comply. The whole deal still pivots on Moscow's commitment to making it work."

== Follow-up ==
The UN Security Council issued an Australia and Luxembourg-drafted non-binding statement on 2 October seeking to enhance aid access. The statement called on Syria to

take immediate steps to facilitate the expansion of humanitarian relief operations, and lift bureaucratic impediments and other obstacles. [Including] promptly facilitating safe and unhindered humanitarian access to people in need, through the most effective ways, including across conflict lines and, where appropriate, across borders from neighbouring countries.

It also urged all sides in the conflict to "immediately demilitarise medical facilities, schools and water stations, refrain from targeting civilian objects, and agree on the modalities to implement humanitarian pauses, as well as key routes to enable promptly...the safe and unhindered passage of humanitarian convoys." At the time of writing, Syria had approved 12 international aid groups but their aid struggled to meet demand and faced delays as they had to negotiate with many government and opposition checkpoints.

== Mission ==
The UN sent in inspectors to carry out the removal and destruction of Syria's arsenal. Their mission was praised by the U.S. and Russia, while Kerry said that he was pleased with the government's cooperation, which was also commended by the inspectors, and the "record time" of the progress made. Ban Ki-moon suggested basing the unit in Cyprus and establishing an OPCW - UN Joint Mission in this regard that would "seek to conduct an operation the likes of which, quite simply, have never been tried before" and that the mission was "dangerous and volatile". He suggested there would be composed of 100 people, including inspectors and support staff. In regard to its work commencing in Syria, the OPCW was awarded the 2013 Nobel Peace Prize. The inspectors also faced security problems such as the Four Seasons Hotel Damascus they were residing at in Damascus was near the site of mortar shelling.

On 31 October, the OPCW reported that the declared production and mixing facilities had been destroyed a day before the deadline. It said that it had inspected 21 out of 23 chemical weapons sites across the country, though two other sides were too dangerous to inspect but the chemical equipment had been moved to other sites which had been inspected. A statement from the organization read: "The OPCW is satisfied it has verified, and seen destroyed, all declared critical production, mixing, filling equipment from all 23 sites." By early November the search of disclosed sites was nearly over.

Albania confirmed that it was requested by the U.S. to destroy the chemical weapons on its soil. However, parliamentary Speaker Ilir Meta said:

We were contacted by the United States, but no decision has been made yet. Any decision will be made transparently and will take into account the interest of the country. I do not think that Albania has the capacity, even other much bigger and more developed countries do not accept to do it.

This was despite protests against having any such weapons on the country's sovereign soil. In response to protests in Tirana and elsewhere, Prime Minister Edi Rama said of the request to destroy the arsenal that "it is impossible for Albania to get involved in this operation." NATO Deputy Secretary General Alexander Vershbow said that the destruction of the chemical weapons was discussed between NATO and Russian defence ministers in Brussels in October. He added that the head of the UN-OPCW mission, Sigrid Kaag, would notify NATO and Russian officials of its work.

The OPCW said that the "most critical" will be removed from the country by the end of 2013 and all the other chemicals except isopropanol would be taken out by 5 February. It added that "sequenced destruction" will start on 15 December and that "priority weapons" will be destroyed by the end of March 2014 with the entire arsenal being cleansed by the end of June 2014. However, it did not say where the destructions would appear. France and Belgium were possible locations, while Norway agreed to provide a merchant ship and an escorting warship to transport the material. The OPCW had, by November 2013, also said that it had neutralised 60 percent of Syria's declared unfilled munitions.

Due to a lack of states willing to host the chemical weapons for its destruction, the OPCW's head, Ahmet Uzümcü, said that the 798 tonnes of chemicals and 7.7 million litres of effluent to be transported and disposed off could be done at sea (international waters). "...all measures, in fact, will be taken appropriately either during the transportation of those substances by ship and also during the destruction." He added that he expected the U.S. to "take the lead" in the process as "there are already some facilities manufactured by the U.S. that can be installed easily on a ship or on land." The U.S. later offered to destroy 500 tonnes of "priority" chemicals on one its ships. The OPCW announced an international plan to destroy the weapons. Russian armoured trucks would carry the munitions (including mustard gas, sarin and VX nerve gas) out of the country, tracked by U.S. satellite equipment and Chinese surveillance cameras. However, the 31 December date was pushed back till 31 March 2014 for the most dangerous weapons. Finland will provide chemical weapons emergency-response capabilities and Russia will also provide the sailors and naval vessels to secure cargo operations at Latakia, while the U.S. will adapt naval vessels for the destruction. Additionally, the British Foreign Office promised to help transport and dispose of 150 tonnes of industrial-grade stockpiled chemicals. Russian Defence Minister Sergei Shoigu commented in the last week of 2013, it had sent 25 armored trucks and 50 other vehicles to help transport the toxic munitions out of the country.

Though the 31 December deadline was missed due to the ongoing conflict, in early January 2014 the first batch of chemicals were taken out of the country for destructions. The OPCW-UN mission reported that those materials had been moved from two unnamed sites to Latakia before being loaded onto a Danish commercial vessel with maritime security for the cargo being provided by China, Denmark, Norway and Russia while moving the shipment to the U.S. naval vessel. Uzumcu said: "This is an important step commencing the transportation of these materials as part of the plan to complete their disposal outside the territory of Syria. I encourage the Syrian government to maintain the momentum to remove the remaining priority chemicals, in a safe and timely manner, so that they can be destroyed outside of Syria as quickly as possible." The coordinator of the mission, Sigrid Kaag, said of this activity that "it is first in a series of moves that the Syrian authorities are expected to undertake to ensure that all chemical agents will be taken out of the country." U.S. State Department spokeswomen Jen Psaki said: "Much more needs to be done. We have no reason to believe that the regime has gone back on any aspect of their promise."

In late January 2014, the U.S. criticised what it said was a slowing pace of removal of the priority one and two chemicals that were declared. Defence Secretary Chuck Hagel expressed "concern" on a visit to Poland over the delay and added "I do not know what the Syrian government's motives are - if this is incompetence - or why they are behind in delivering these materials. They need to fix this." U.S. Ambassador Robert Mikulak also criticised the alleged inaction in a statement to the OPCW. "The effort to remove chemical agent and key precursor chemicals from Syria has seriously languished and stalled." In response, Russian diplomat Mikhail Ulyanov said that "the Syrians are approaching the fulfilment of their obligations seriously and in good faith." Deputy Foreign Minister Gennady Gatilov then added that the 1 March deadline will be met and that "the Syrians announced that the removal of a large shipment of chemical substances is planned in February."

After missing the 5 February deadline to remove its declared munitions out of the country, Syria proposed a 100-day plan. The OPCW-UN mission met in the Hague to discuss these proposals. An unnamed UN diplomat suggested it could still be removed by March and that Syria's proposed end May deadline would not leave enough time for all munitions to be destroyed by the end of June. In early March, the OPCW confirmed that a third of Syrian chemical weapons, including mustard gas, were shipped for destruction abroad; it added that six consignments of toxic agents it had declared were handed over and that two more shipments were headed for Latakia to be transferred to the U.S. navy ship MV Cape Ray and other commercial destruction facilities in the U.K. and Germany. Syria also submitted a revised plan to remove all its chemical weapons by the end of April 2014, which was under negotiation at an executive council meeting at the OPCW. On 27 March, the OPCW announced that 49% of the raw materials used for poison gas and nerve agents were sent abroad for destruction and that 53.6% of the chemicals were either removed or already destroyed inside the country.

The OPCW mission head, Sigrid Kaag, said that Syria could meet the 27 April deadline to remove all its chemical agents from the country to be destroyed by 30 June. Syria had, however, suspended some transfers for security reasons, but would resume them in the "coming days." Kaag also warned the UNSC that further delays would make it "increasingly challenging" to adhere to the deadline. "I have repeated to Syrian authorities the need for a swift resumption of the removal operation. Operations have to restart immediately." Kaag added that 72 containers filled with chemical weapons were ready to be transferred to Latakia for shipment out of the country and that this would now account for 90 percent of the country's stockpile. In total the OPCW had said by the end of March 2014 that the total chemicals to be removed or destroyed was 53.6% and that Syria had pledged to remove all its chemicals by 13 April, except for those that were in areas "that are presently inaccessible," for which a further two weeks was given. On 20 April, Kaag said that 80% of the declared material has been shipped out and that Syria was on course to meet the 27 April deadline.

On 27 April, Kaag said that despite the security challenges the government was required to meet the 30 June deadline to destroy all toxic chemicals. She added that 7.5-8% of the declared material remained in the country at "one particular site. "However, 92.5 percent of chemical weapons material removed or destroyed is significant progress. A small percentage is to be destroyed, regardless, in-country. That can be done. It's a matter of accessing the site." Another dispute was whether Syria would be mandated to destroy 12 remaining chemical weapons production sites. Syria planned to seal them as they had been rendered unusable, but Western countries called for them to be destroyed because it may be able to be reopened in the future.

== See also ==
- List of United Nations Security Council Resolutions 2101 to 2200 (2013–2015)
