= United Nations Security Council Resolution 2428 =

United Nations Security Council Resolution

UN Security Council Resolution 2428
- UN emblem
- Date: 13 July 2018
- Meeting no.: 8,310
- Code: S/RES/2428 (Document)
- Subject: Sudan and South Sudan
- Voting summary: 9 voted for; None voted against; 6 abstained
- Result: Adopted

Security Council composition
- Permanent members: China; France; Russia; United Kingdom; United States
- Non-permanent members: Bolivia; Côte d'Ivoire; Equatorial Guinea; Ethiopia; Kazakhstan; Kuwait; Netherlands; Peru; Poland; Sweden

United Nations Security Council Resolution 2428 was adopted on 13 July 2018. According to the resolution, the Security Council voted to impose an arms embargo in South Sudan in addition to current sanctions until 31 May 2019.

Nine members of the Council voted in favor, while Bolivia, China, Equatorial Guinea, Ethiopia, Kazakhstan and Russia abstained.

== See also ==
- List of United Nations Security Council Resolutions 2401 to 2500 (2018–2019)
