= United Nations Security Council Resolution 2042 =

UN Security Council Resolution 2042
- Flag of Syria
- Date: 14 April 2012
- Meeting no.: 6,751
- Code: S/RES/2042 (Document)
- Subject: Syrian uprising
- Voting summary: 15 voted for; None voted against; None abstained
- Result: Adopted

Security Council composition
- Permanent members: China; France; Russia; United Kingdom; United States
- Non-permanent members: Azerbaijan; Colombia; Germany; Guatemala; India; Morocco; Pakistan; Portugal; South Africa; Togo

United Nations Security Council Resolution 2042 was unanimously adopted on 14 April 2012.

== Content ==
The resolution, which authorizes the dispatch of an advance team of up to 30 unarmed military observers to Syria to monitor compliance with the ceasefire agreement, passed 15–0.

The observers will be tasked with establishing and maintaining contact with both sides of the conflict, and making reports on compliance with the ceasefire agreement until a full mission is deployed in the country.

== See also ==
- List of United Nations Security Council Resolutions 2001 to 2100
- United Nations Security Council Resolution 2043 of 21 April 2012
- List of United Nations resolutions concerning Syria
