= Vetoed United Nations Security Council resolutions on Syria =

This is a list of vetoed United Nations Security Council resolutions regarding the Syrian Civil War.

Date	Draft	Drafters	Vetoing members	Explanations of veto
10 July 2020	S/2020/667		China; Russia	
7 July 2020	S/2020/654		China; Russia	
20 December 2019	S/2019/961		China; Russia	
19 September 2019	S/2019/756	Belgium, Germany and Kuwait	China; Russia	Zhang Jun (China), said that the humanitarian situation in Syria was created by terrorist organizations attempting to spread their influence. His delegation had proposed reasonable revisions, but the draft failed to touch upon the essence of the issue or to address China's core concerns. The complicated and sensitive humanitarian situation should be considered in a balanced way, without focusing on select issues. The international community must fully respect Syria's sovereignty, independence, unity and territorial integrity, listen to the views of its Government and seek a solution through political means, while also paying attention to post-war reconstruction and economic development. He encouraged the council to support an alternative draft resolution, proposed by the Russian Federation and China, that addresses humanitarian and counter-terrorism issues in Syria in a comprehensive manner. He firmly rejected groundless accusations made by representatives of the United Kingdom and the United States, stressing that China has the right to decide independently how it will vote in the council.; Vasily Nebenzya (Russia), said Council President for September, speaking in his national capacity, said that, if it was true that the "humanitarian troika" was guided exclusively by humanitarian objectives, then his delegation would support its draft resolution. Unfortunately, the goal of the text is to save international terrorists entrenched in Idlib from their final defeat. Throughout the negotiations, the Russian Federation has had a difficult feeling about the text. Improbable and unsubstantiated figures about mass movements of people are being thrown about, but no large-scale military operations are under way in Idlib, where the ceasefire announced on 31 August has been undermined by terrorists. In taking its decisions, the Council cannot be guided by lies and misinformation, he said, calling it immoral to speculate about the lives of civilians held hostage by terrorists who have connections to Western colleagues on the council. From the outset, his delegation had warned the co‑sponsors that their resolution would to fail, yet they have put it to a vote. He called on those delegations that want to see the situation resolved in Syria to reject the text.; Syria who was present but not voting called it a "surreal farce" that three western nations drafted a politically biased resolution instead of a humanitarian one, further alleging war crimes by the United States and rebel funding by Kuwait. Syria commended Russia and China for voting down the draft.
10 April 2018	S/2018/321	Albania, Australia, Bulgaria, Canada, Denmark, Estonia, Finland, France, Germany, Italy, Latvia, Lithuania, Montenegro, Netherlands, Norway, Peru, Poland, Qatar, Republic of Moldova, Slovenia, Sweden, The former Yugoslav Republic of Macedonia, Turkey, Ukraine, United Kingdom of Great Britain and Northern Ireland and United States of America	Russia	
17 November 2017	S/2017/970	Japan	Russia	
16 November 2017	S/2017/962	France, Italy, Japan, Sweden, Ukraine, United Kingdom of Great Britain and Northern Ireland and United States of America	Russia	
24 October 2017	S/2017/884	Albania, Australia, Austria, Belgium, Bulgaria, Canada, Croatia, Cyprus, Czechia, Denmark, Estonia, Finland, France, Germany, Greece, Hungary, Iceland, Ireland, Israel, Italy, Japan, Latvia, Liechtenstein, Lithuania, Luxembourg, Malta, Montenegro, Netherlands, Norway, Poland, Portugal, Qatar, Republic of Korea, Romania, Slovakia, Slovenia, Spain, Turkey, Ukraine, United Kingdom of Great Britain and Northern Ireland and United States of America	Russia	
12 April 2017	S/2017/315	France, United Kingdom of Great Britain and Northern Ireland and United States of America	Russia	Russian deputy envoy to the Security Council, Vladimir Safronkov: The primary problem was the fact that the draft resolution by the troika designated the guilty party prior to an independent and objective investigation.
28 February 2017	S/2017/172	Albania, Australia, Austria, Belgium, Bulgaria, Canada, Croatia, Cyprus, Czechia, Denmark, Estonia, Finland, France, Germany, Greece, Iceland, Ireland, Israel, Italy, Japan, Latvia, Liechtenstein, Lithuania, Luxembourg, Malta, Montenegro, Netherlands, New Zealand, Norway, Poland, Portugal, Qatar, Romania, Saudi Arabia, Slovakia, Spain, Sweden, Turkey, Ukraine, United Arab Emirates, United Kingdom of Great Britain and Northern Ireland and United States of America	China, Russia	
5 December 2016	S/2016/1026	Andorra, Australia, Austria, Belgium, Bulgaria, Canada, Costa Rica, Croatia, Cyprus, Czech Republic, Denmark, Estonia, Finland, France, Georgia, Germany, Greece, Hungary, Iceland, Ireland, Italy, Latvia, Lithuania, Luxembourg, Malta, Mexico, Monaco, Morocco, Netherlands, Norway, Poland, Portugal, Qatar, Romania, San Marino, Saudi Arabia, Senegal, Slovakia, Slovenia, Spain, Sweden, Turkey, Ukraine, United Arab Emirates, United Kingdom of Great Britain and Northern Ireland and United States of America	China, Russia	
8 October 2016	S/2016/846	Andorra, Australia, Austria, Belgium, Bulgaria, Canada, Costa Rica, Croatia, Cyprus, Czech Republic, Denmark, Estonia, Finland, France, Georgia, Germany, Greece, Hungary, Iceland, Ireland, Italy, Latvia, Lithuania, Luxembourg, Malta, Mexico, Monaco, Morocco, Netherlands, Norway, Poland, Portugal, Qatar, Romania, San Marino, Saudi Arabia, Senegal, Slovakia, Slovenia, Spain, Sweden, Turkey, Ukraine, United Arab Emirates, United Kingdom of Great Britain and Northern Ireland and United States of America	Russia	Russian Foreign Ministry: The text of the document, which was obviously drawn up with Washington's encouragement directly after the United States refused to observe the Russian-US agreements on the Syrian settlement, flagrantly misrepresented the actual state of affairs and had a politically charged and unbalanced character. The French-proposed document indiscriminately laid the blame for the escalation of tensions in the Syrian Arab Republic solely on the country's authorities and plainly attempted, through a ban on military flights over the city of Aleppo, to afford protection to Jabhat al-Nusra terrorists and the militants that have merged with it, despite the UN member states' obligation to fight the terrorist threat with all available means. The draft resolution completely obscured the fact that the humanitarian crisis in Aleppo was provoked deliberately, when in August and September the militants refused to provide access to humanitarian convoys, threatening to open fire on them. At the same time, the document ignored the need to promptly initiate an intra-Syrian political process, which is being sabotaged by the same Syrian opposition members who are supported and covered by the West in every possible way.
22 May 2014	S/2014/348: Reaffirms its strong condemnation of the widespread violations of human rights and international humanitarian law by the Syrian authorities and pro-government militias, as well as the human rights abuses and violations of international humanitarian law by non-State armed groups.; Refer the situation in the Syrian Arab Republic described in paragraph 1 above since March 2011 to the Prosecutor of the International Criminal Court.	Albania, Andorra, Australia, Belgium, Botswana, Bulgaria, Canada, Central African Republic, Chile, Croatia, Cyprus, Czech Republic, Democratic Republic of the Congo, Denmark, Estonia, Finland, France, Georgia, Germany, Greece, Hungary, Iceland, Ireland, Italy, Ivory Coast, Japan, Jordan, Latvia, Libya, Liechtenstein, Lithuania, Luxembourg, Macedonia, Malta, Marshall Islands, Mexico, Moldova, Monaco, Montenegro, Netherlands, New Zealand, Norway, Panama, Poland, Portugal, Qatar, Romania, Samoa, San Marino, Saudi Arabia, Senegal, Serbia, Seychelles, Slovakia, Slovenia, South Korea, Spain, Sweden, Switzerland, Turkey, UAE, Ukraine, United Kingdom, United States	China, Russia	Wang Min (Extraordinary and Plenipotentiary Ambassador of China to the UN): Any action seeking referral to the International Criminal Court should be based on the premise of respect for the judicial sovereignty of States and the principle of complementarity. Historically, China had always held reservations about referring situations to the Court. Although current efforts to seek a political solution were experiencing difficulties, the international community must remain patient.; Vitaly Churkin (Permanent Representative of Russia to the UN): although the motivations of delegations supporting the draft resolution and their emotions are understandable, it was difficult to understand France's motivation since that delegation had been fully aware of the result of tabling the text draft. "P5" unity had been demonstrated through concrete positive results like resolutions 2118 on the destruction of Syria's chemical weapons, or resolution 2139 on humanitarian issues. "Why deal a blow to the P5 in this case?"
19 July 2012	S/2012/538: Commend the United Nations' Supervision Mission in Syria (UNSMIS) personnel for their continued efforts in a dangerous and volatile environment.; Cease troop movements towards population centres, and all use of heavy weapons in such centres.; Decide that, if the Syrian authorities have not fully complied with paragraph above within ten days, then it shall impose immediately measures under Article 41 of the UN Charter (complete or partial interruption of economic relations and of rail, sea, air, postal, telegraphic, radio, and other means of communication, and the severance of diplomatic relations).	France, Germany, Portugal, United Kingdom, United States	China, Russia	Li Baodong (Permanent Representative of the People's Republic of China to the UN): The draft resolution, however, was counter-productive, as it had uneven content that put pressure on only one party, which would only derail the issue from the track of political settlement and undermine regional peace and stability.; Vitaly Churkin (Permanent Representative of Russia to the UN): Instead of levelling insinuations against the Russian Federation, which throughout the conflict had provided key support for the Annan mission, those members had today made "unacceptable statements". They could have done something to promote dialogue with their Syrian counterparts, rather than fan the flames of conflict, including of Syrian terrorist groups, as they furthered their own "geopolitical designs".
4 February 2012	S/2012/77: Supports the Plan of Action of the League of Arab States of 2 November 2011 and its decision of 22 January 2012.; Requests the Secretary-General to report on the implementation of this resolution, in consultation with the League of Arab States, within 21 days after its adoption.; Reviews implementation of this resolution within 21 days and, in the event of non-compliance, to consider further measures.	Bahrain, Colombia, Egypt, France, Germany, Jordan, Kuwait, Libya, Morocco, Oman, Portugal, Qatar, Saudi Arabia, Togo, Tunisia, Turkey, United Arab Emirates, United Kingdom, United States	China, Russia	Li Baodong (Permanent Representative of the People's Republic of China to the UN): The country's sovereignty, independence and territorial integrity must be respected and he asked for the respect of the Syrian people for a reform process that was in their own interest.; Vitaly Churkin (Permanent Representative of Russia to the UN): The draft resolution voted down today sought to send an "unbalanced" message to Syria, and it did not accurately reflect the situation there. No proposal had been made to end attacks by armed groups, or their association with extremists.
4 October 2011	S/2011/612: Condemns the continued grave and systematic human rights violations and the use of force against civilians by the Syrian authorities, and expresses profound regret at the deaths of thousands of people including women and children.; Calls upon all States to exercise vigilance and restraint over the direct or indirect supply, sale or transfer to Syria of arms and related materiel of all types, as well as technical training, financial resources or services, advice, or other services or assistance related to such arms and related material.; Expresses its intention to review Syria's implementation of this resolution within 30 days and to consider its options, including measures under Article 41 of the United Nations Charter (complete or partial interruption of economic relations and of rail, sea, air, postal, telegraphic, radio, and other means of communication, and the severance of diplomatic relations).	France, Germany, Portugal, United Kingdom	China, Russia	Li Baodong (Permanent Representative of the People's Republic of China to the UN): The Council should encourage those objectives while respecting Syria's sovereignty's and territorial integrity. Any action it took should contribute to peace and stability and comply with the United Nations Charter principles of non-interference in internal affairs. His country's position on those principles had remained consistent and firm.; Vitaly Churkin (Permanent Representative of Russia to the UN): The Russian Federation could not agree with the accusatory tone against Damascus, he said, nor the ultimatum of sanctions against peaceful crisis settlement. The Russian Federation's proposals on the non-acceptability of military intervention, among others, had not been taken into account.

== See also ==
- List of United Nations resolutions concerning Syria
- List of vetoed United Nations Security Council resolutions
