= United Nations Security Council Resolution 2533 =

UNSC resolution adopted in 2020 for situation in Syria

UN Security Council Resolution 2533
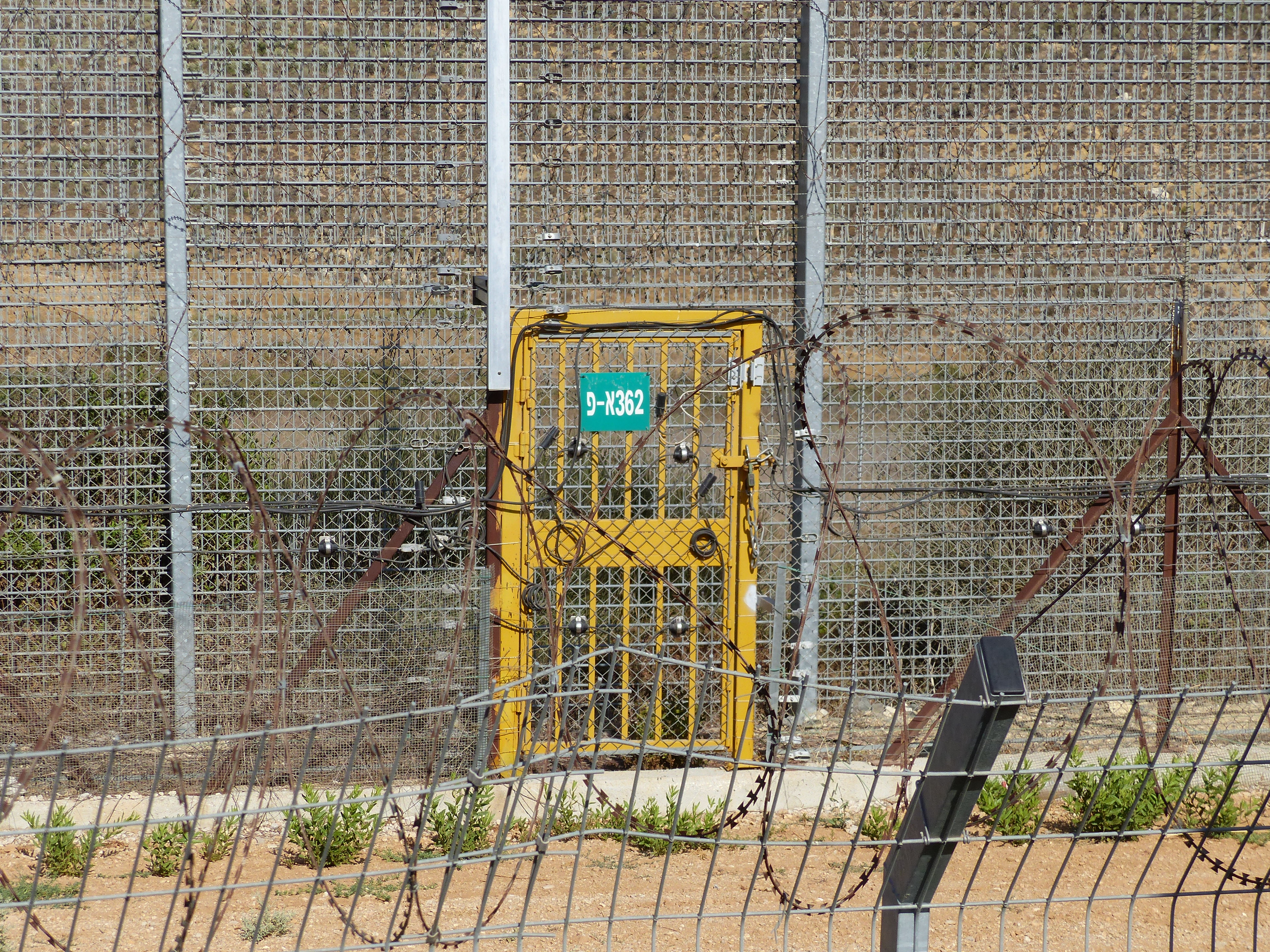
- Syria border
- Date: 11 July 2020
- Code: S/RES/2533 (2020) (Document)
- Subject: Humanitarian situation in Syria
- Voting summary: 12 voted for; None voted against; 3 abstained
- Result: Adopted

Security Council composition
- Permanent members: China; France; Russia; United Kingdom; United States
- Non-permanent members: Belgium; Dominican Republic; Estonia; Germany; Indonesia; Niger; St.Vincent–Grenadines; South Africa; Tunisia; Vietnam

United Nations Security Council Resolution 2533 was passed by 12 votes and 3 abstentions and adopted on 11 July 2020. It renewed authorization to deliver humanitarian assistance of medical and food supplies into Syria.

The adoption of resolutions, the UN Security Council has authorized UN agencies and their partners to use routes across conflict lines and the border crossings at Bab al-Salam, Bab al-Hawa, Al-Ramtha and Al-Yaarubiyah. After the resolution 2533, the Government of Syria is notified in advance of each shipment, renewal of relief delivery authorization and monitoring mechanism for a period of 12 months is done.

== Statement ==
The Security Council,

Recalling its resolutions its past resolutions on humanitarian situation in Syria and its Presidential Statements of 3 August 2011 (S/PRST/2011/16), 21 March 2012 (S/PRST/2012/6), 5 April 2012 (S/PRST/2012/10), 2 October 2013 (S/PRST/2013/15), 24 April 2015 (S/PRST/2015/10),17 August 2015 (S/PRST/2015/15), and 8 October 2019 (S/PRST/2019/12),

Reaffirming its strong commitment to the sovereignty, independence, unity and territorial integrity of Syria and to the purposes and principles of the Charter of the United Nations, Determining that the devastating humanitarian situation in Syria continues to constitute a threat to peace and security in the region, Underscoring that Member States are obligated under Article 25 of the Charter of the United Nations to accept and carry out the Council’s decisions,

1. Demands the full and immediate implementation of all provisions of all relevant Security Council resolutions, including resolutions 2139 (2014), 2165 (2014), 2191 (2014), 2258 (2015), 2332 (2016), 2393 (2017), 2401 (2018), 2449 (2018) and 2504 (2020);
2. Decides to renew the decisions in paragraphs 2 and 3 of Security Council resolution 2165 (2014), for a period of twelve months, that is, until 10 July 2021, excluding the border crossings of Al-Ramtha, Al Yarubiyah and Bab al-Salam;
3. Requests the Secretary-General to brief the Council monthly and to provide a report on a regular basis, at least every 60 days, on the implementation of resolutions 2139 (2014), 2165 (2014), 2191 (2014), 2258 (2015), 2332 (2016), 2393 (2017), 2401 (2018), 2449 (2018), 2504 (2020) and this resolution and on compliance by all relevant parties in Syria and further requests the Secretary-General to continue to include in his reports overall trends in United Nations cross-line and cross-border humanitarian access and detailed information on the humanitarian assistance delivered through United Nations humanitarian cross-border operations, including on the number of beneficiaries, locations of aid deliveries at district-level and the volume and nature of items delivered;
4. Decides to remain actively seized of the matter.

— UNSC official document
