= United Nations Security Council Resolution 2401 =

UN Security Council Resolution 2401
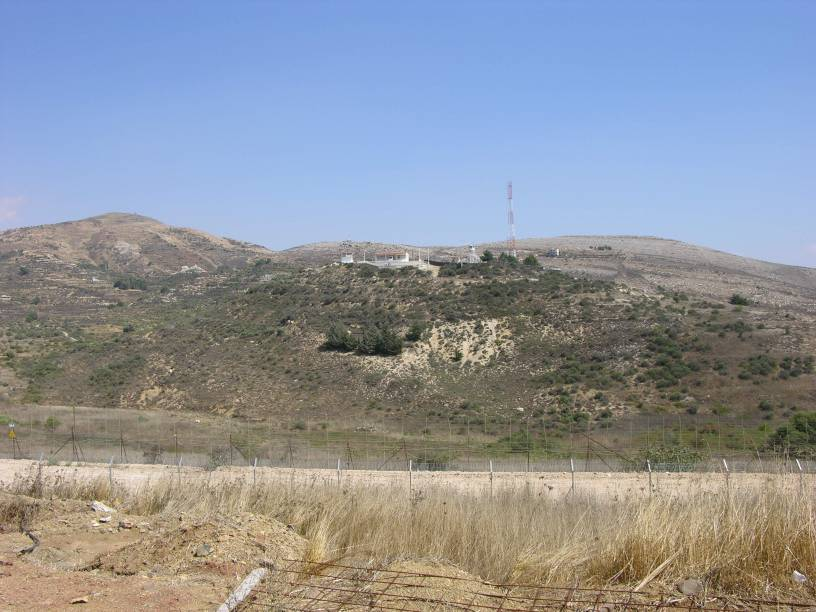
- Syria border
- Date: 24 February 2018
- Code: S/RES/2401 (2018) (Document)
- Subject: Syria
- Voting summary: 15 voted for; None voted against; None abstained
- Result: Adopted

Security Council composition
- Permanent members: China; France; Russia; United Kingdom; United States
- Non-permanent members: Bolivia; Côte d'Ivoire; Equatorial Guinea; Ethiopia; Kazakhstan; Kuwait; Netherlands; Peru; Poland; Sweden

United Nations Security Council Resolution 2401 was unanimously adopted on 24 February 2018. It calls for a nationwide ceasefire in Syria for 30 days. According to the resolution, the cease-fire does not apply to military operations against the Islamic State, al-Qaeda and Al-Nusra Front and their associates, and other terrorist groups as designated by the Security Council.

After adoption, Syrian Permanent Representative Bashar Jaafari stated that the regime would continue to practice "a sovereign right of self-defense" and would go after what it deemed were terrorist groups.

While People's Protection Units accepted the resolution 2401 and said that it would act, according to the Sana news agency, the Turkish Army continues to fight in Afrin, and has continued its attacks after the passage of the resolution.

French President, Emmanuel Macron, telephoned the Turkish President, Recep Tayyip Erdogan, telling him that the truce in Syria also applies in the Afrin Region. "I think the resolution was clear here in naming exactly which groups are considered to be exempt from the ceasefire," State Department Spokesperson Nauert said. Turkish Deputy Prime Minister, Bekir Bozdag, has accused the United States of using double standards.

== See also ==
- List of United Nations resolutions concerning Syria
- Rif Dimashq offensive (February 2018)
