= List of vetoed United Nations Security Council resolutions =

This is a list of United Nations Security Council Resolutions that have been vetoed by one of the five permanent members of the Security Council since 16 February 1946.

== Resolutions ==
Date	Draft	Meeting record	Agenda item	Vetoing permanent member
30 October 2026	S/2026/868	S/PV.10260	The situation concerning Western Sahara	Russia
17 September 2026	S/2026/740	S/PV.10224	Non-proliferation (Iran)	China; Russia
7 April 2026	S/2026/273	S/PV.10130	The situation in the Middle East (2026 Strait of Hormuz crisis)	China; Russia
18 September 2025	S/2025/583	S/PV.10000	The situation in the Middle East, including the Palestinian question (Gaza war)	United States
4 June 2025	S/2025/353	S/PV.9929	The situation in the Middle East, including the Palestinian question (Gaza war)	United States
24 February 2025	S/2025/115; S/2025/116	S/PV.9866	Maintenance of peace and security of Ukraine	Russia
20 November 2024	S/2024/835	S/PV.9790	The situation in the Middle East, including the Palestinian question (Gaza war)	United States
18 November 2024	S/2024/826	S/PV.9786	Reports of the Secretary-General on the Sudan and South Sudan	Russia
24 April 2024	S/2024/302	S/PV.9616	Non-proliferation (see also: Outer Space Treaty)	Russia
18 April 2024	S/2024/312	S/PV.9609	Admission of new Members Palestine (State of Palestine)	United States
28 March 2024	S/2024/255	S/PV.9591	Non-proliferation/Democratic People's Republic of Korea	Russia
22 March 2024	S/2024/239	S/PV.9584	The situation in the Middle East, including the Palestinian question (Gaza war)	China; Russia
20 February 2024	S/2024/173	S/PV.9552	The situation in the Middle East, including the Palestinian question (Gaza war)	United States
22 December 2023	S/2023/1029 oral amendment	S/PV.9520	The situation in the Middle East, including the Palestinian question (Gaza war)	United States
8 December 2023	S/2023/970	S/PV.9499	The situation in the Middle East, including the Palestinian question (Gaza war)	United States
25 October 2023	S/2023/792	S/PV.9453	The situation in the Middle East, including the Palestinian question (Gaza war)	China; Russia
18 October 2023	S/2023/773	S/PV.9442	The situation in the Middle East, including the Palestinian question (Gaza war)	United States
30 August 2023	S/2023/638	S/PV.9408	The situation in Mali	Russia
11 July 2023	S/2023/506	S/PV.9371	The situation in the Middle East (Syria)	Russia
30 September 2022	S/2022/720	S/PV.9143	Maintenance of peace and security of Ukraine	Russia
8 July 2022	S/2022/538	S/PV.9087	The situation in the Middle East (Syria)	Russia
26 May 2022	S/2022/431	S/PV.9048	Non-proliferation/Democratic People's Republic of Korea	China; Russia
25 February 2022	S/2022/155	S/PV.8979	Letter dated 28 February 2014 from the Permanent Representative of Ukraine to the United Nations addressed to the President of the Security Council (S/2014/136). (Russian invasion of Ukraine)	Russia
13 December 2021	S/2021/990	S/PV.8926	Maintenance of international peace and security: Climate and security	Russia
31 August 2020	S/2020/852	S/2020/870; S/2020/865	Threats to international peace and security caused by terrorist attacks	United States
10 July 2020	S/2020/667	S/2020/693; S/2020/681	Humanitarian access to Syria	China; Russia
7 July 2020	S/2020/654	S/2020/661; S/2020/657	Humanitarian access to Syria	China; Russia
20 December 2019	S/2019/961	S/PV.8697	Humanitarian access to Syria (via borders with Iraq and Turkey)	China; Russia
19 September 2019	S/2019/756	S/PV.8623	The situation in the Middle East (concerning the Northwestern Syria offensive, part of the ongoing Syrian civil war)	China; Russia
28 February 2019	S/2019/186	S/PV.8476	The situation in the Bolivarian Republic of Venezuela (concerning the Venezuelan presidential crisis and the results of the 2018 presidential election)	China; Russia
1 June 2018	S/2018/516	S/PV.8274	Middle East situation, including the Palestinian question (concerning the 2018 Gaza border protests)	United States
10 April 2018	S/2018/321	S/PV.8228	The situation in the Middle East (Use of chemical weapons in the Syrian Civil War)	Russia
26 February 2018	S/2018/156	S/PV.8190	Sanctions against Yemen (Yemeni Civil War (2014–present))	Russia
18 December 2017	S/2017/1060	S/PV.8139	Middle East situation, including the Palestinian question (concerning the United States recognition of Jerusalem as Israeli capital)	United States
17 November 2017	S/2017/970	S/PV.8107	Middle East (Use of chemical weapons in the Syrian Civil War)	Russia
16 November 2017	S/2017/962	S/PV.8105	Middle East (Use of chemical weapons in the Syrian Civil War)	Russia
24 October 2017	S/2017/884	S/PV.8073	Middle East (Use of chemical weapons in the Syrian Civil War)	Russia
12 April 2017	S/2017/315	S/PV.7922	Middle East (Use of chemical weapons in the Syrian Civil War)	Russia
28 February 2017	S/2017/172	S/PV.7893	Middle East (Use of chemical weapons in the Syrian Civil War)	China; Russia
5 December 2016	S/2016/1026	S/PV.7825	Middle East (Syrian civil war)	China; Russia
8 October 2016	S/2016/846	S/PV.7785	Middle East (Syrian civil war)	Russia
29 July 2015	S/2015/562	S/PV.7498	Letter dated 28 February 2014 from the Permanent Representative of Ukraine to the United Nations addressed to the President of the Security Council (S/2014/136). (downing of Malaysia Airlines flight MH 17)	Russia
8 July 2015	S/2015/508	S/PV.7481	The situation in Bosnia and Herzegovina (20th anniversary of the Srebrenica massacre during the Bosnian War)	Russia
22 May 2014	S/2014/348	S/PV.7180	Middle East – Syria (Syrian civil war)	China; Russia
15 March 2014	S/2014/189	S/PV.7138	Letter dated 28 February 2014 from the Permanent Representative of Ukraine to the United Nations addressed to the President of the Security Council (S/2014/136). (concerning the Russian annexation of the Crimean peninsula)	Russia
19 July 2012	S/2012/538	S/PV.6810	Middle East – Syria (Syrian civil war)	China; Russia
4 February 2012	S/2012/77	S/PV.6711	Middle East – Syria (Syrian civil war)	China; Russia
4 October 2011	S/2011/612	S/PV.6627	Middle East – Syria (Syrian civil war)	China; Russia
18 February 2011	S/2011/24	S/PV.6484	Middle East situation, including the Palestinian question (concerning Israeli settlements)	United States
15 June 2009	S/2009/310	S/PV.6143	Georgia (Russo-Georgian War)	Russia
11 July 2008	S/2008/447	S/PV.5933	Peace and Security – Africa (Zimbabwe) (conflict surrounding 2008 Zimbabwean general election)	China; Russia
12 January 2007	S/2007/14	S/PV.5619	Myanmar (concerning Military junta rule preluding the Saffron Revolution)	China; Russia
11 November 2006	S/2006/878	S/PV.5565	Middle East situation, including the Palestinian question (concerning the 2006 shelling of Beit Hanoun and Palestinian rocket attacks on Israel)	United States
13 July 2006	S/2006/508	S/PV.5418	Middle East situation, including the Palestinian question (concerning the 2006 Hezbollah cross-border raid and the start of the 2006 Lebanon War)	United States
5 October 2004	S/2004/783	S/PV.5051	Middle East situation, including the Palestinian question (concerning the Second Intifada)	United States
21 April 2004	S/2004/313	S/PV.4947	Cyprus (Cyprus dispute and the Annan Plan for Cyprus)	Russia
25 March 2004	S/2004/240	S/PV.4934	Middle East situation, including the Palestinian question (concerning the Second Intifada)	United States
14 October 2003	S/2003/980	S/PV.4842	The situation in the Middle East, including the Palestinian question (concerning the Second Intifada)	United States
16 September 2003	S/2003/891	S/PV.4828	The situation in the Middle East, including the Palestinian question (concerning the Second Intifada)	United States
20 December 2002	S/2002/1385	S/PV.4681	The situation in the Middle East, including the Palestinian question (concerning the Second Intifada)	United States
30 June 2002	S/2002/712	S/PV.4563	The situation in Bosnia and Herzegovina (concerning the Dayton Agreement which ended the Bosnian War)	United States
14-15 December 2001	S/2001/1199	S/PV.4438	The situation in the Middle East, including the Palestinian question (concerning the Second Intifada)	United States
27-28 March 2001	S/2001/270	S/PV.4305	The situation in the Middle East, including the Palestinian question (concerning the Second Intifada)	United States
25 February 1999	S/1999/201	S/PV.3982	The situation in the former Yugoslav Republic of Macedonia (the effect of the Kosovo War on Macedonia which eventually led to 2001 insurgency in the Republic of Macedonia)	China
21 March 1997	S/1997/241	S/PV.3756	The situation in the occupied Arab territories (Israeli settlements, specifically Har Homa)	United States
7 March 1997	S/1997/199	S/PV.3747	The situation in the occupied Arab territories (Israeli settlements, specifically Har Homa)	United States
10 January 1997	S/1997/18	S/PV.3730	Central America: efforts towards peace (the Guatemalan Peace Process 1994-1996 ending the Guatemalan Civil War)	China
19 November 1996	S/1996/952	S/PV.3714	Appointment of Secretary-General	United States
17 May 1995	S/1995/394	S/PV.3538	The situation in the occupied Arab territories (Israeli settlements)	United States
2 December 1994	S/1994/1358	S/PV.3475	The situation in the Republic of Bosnia and Herzegovina (Yugoslav Wars, mainly the Bosnian War)	Russia
11 May 1993	S/25693	S/PV.3211	The situation in Cyprus (United Nations Peacekeeping Force in Cyprus concerning the Cyprus dispute)	Russia
31 May 1990	S/21326	S/PV.2926	The situation in the occupied Arab territories (First Intifada)	United States
17 January 1990	S/21084	S/PV.2905	Letter dated 3 January 1990 from Nicaragua to the President of the Security Council (concerning the violation of the diplomatic status of the Nicaraguan Embassy in Panama by U.S. Special Forces during the United States invasion of Panama)	United States
23 December 1989	S/21048	S/PV.2902	The situation in Panama (United States invasion of Panama)	France; United Kingdom; United States
7 November 1989	S/20945/Rev.1	S/PV.2889	The situation in the occupied Arab territories (First Intifada)	United States
9 June 1989	S/20677	S/PV.2867	The situation in the occupied Arab territories (First Intifada)	United States
17 February 1989	S/20463	S/PV.2850	The situation in the occupied Arab territories (First Intifada)	United States
11 January 1989	S/20378	S/PV.2841	Letters dated 4 January 1989 from Libya and Bahrain to the President of the Security Council (1989 air battle near Tobruk involving the United States and Libya)	France; United Kingdom; United States
14 December 1988	S/20322	S/PV.2832	The situation in the Middle East (Israeli–Lebanese conflict)	United States
10 May 1988	S/19868	S/PV.2814	The situation in the Middle East (Israeli–Lebanese conflict)	United States
15 April 1988	S/19780	S/PV.2806	The situation in the occupied Arab territories (First Intifada)	United States
8 March 1988	S/19585	S/PV.2797	The question of South Africa (Apartheid and South African Border War)	United Kingdom; United States
1 February 1988	S/19466	S/PV.2790	The situation in the occupied Arab territories (First Intifada)	United States
18 January 1988	S/19434	S/PV.2784	The situation in the Middle East (Israeli–Lebanese conflict)	United States
9 April 1987	S/18785	S/PV.2747	The situation in Namibia (South African Border War)	United Kingdom; United States
20 February 1987	S/18705	S/PV.2738	The question of South Africa (Apartheid and South African Border War)	United Kingdom; United States
28 October 1986	S/18428	S/PV.2718	Letter dated 17 October 1986 from Nicaragua to the President of the Security Council (Nicaragua v. United States about United States support for the Contras)	United States
31 July 1986	S/18250	S/PV.2704	Letter dated 22 July 1986 from Nicaragua to the President of the Security Council (Nicaragua v. United States about United States support for the Contras)	United States
18 June 1986	S/18163	S/PV.2693	Complaint by Angola against South Africa (Angolan Civil War)	United Kingdom; United States
23 May 1986	S/18087/Rev.1	S/PV.2686	The situation in Southern Africa (South African Border War)	United Kingdom; United States
21 April 1986	S/18016/Rev.1	S/PV.2682	Letters dated 15 April 1986 from Libya, Burkina Faso, Syria and Oman to the President of the Security Council (1986 United States bombing of Libya)	France; United Kingdom; United States
6 February 1986	S/17796/Rev.1	S/PV.2655	Letter dated 4 February 1986 from Syria to the President of the Security Council (Israel intercepts Libyan plane)	United States
30 January 1986	S/17769/Rev.1	S/PV.2650	The situation in the occupied Arab territories (Positions on Jerusalem)	United States
17 January 1986	S/17730/Rev.2	S/PV.2642	The situation in the Middle East (Israeli–Lebanese conflict)	United States
15 November 1985	S/17633	S/PV.2629	The situation in Namibia (Transitional Government of National Unity (Namibia) and the South African Border War)	United Kingdom; United States
13 September 1985	S/17459	S/PV.2605	The situation in the occupied Arab territories	United States
26 July 1985	S/17354/Rev.1	S/PV.2602	The question of South Africa	United Kingdom; United States
10 May 1985	S/17172	S/PV.2580	Letter dated 6 May 1985 from Nicaragua to the President of the Security Council	United States
12 March 1985	S/17000	S/PV.2573	The situation in the Middle East (1982 Lebanon War)	United States
6 September 1984	S/16732	S/PV.2556	The situation in the Middle East (1982 Lebanon War)	United States
4 April 1984	S/16463	S/PV.2529	Letter dated 29 March 1984 from Nicaragua to the President of the Security Council (Foreign interference, including the mining of harbors in the Contra War)	United States
29 February 1984	S/16351/Rev.2	S/PV.2519	The situation in the Middle East (1982 Lebanon War)	Soviet Union
27-28 October 1983	S/16077/Rev.1	S/PV.2491	The situation in Grenada (United States-led Invasion of Grenada and the events leading up to it)	United States
12 September 1983	S/15966/Rev.1	S/PV.2476	Letters dated 1 September 1983 from the US, the Republic of Korea, Canada and Japan to the President of the Security Council and Letter dated 2 September 1983 from Australia to the President of the Security Council (Soviet shooting down of commercial Korean Air Lines Flight 007)	Soviet Union
2 August 1983	S/15895	S/PV.2461	The situation in the occupied Arab territories	United States
6 August 1982	S/15347/Rev.1	S/PV.2391	The situation in the Middle East (1982 Lebanon War)	United States
26 June 1982	S/15255/Rev.2	S/PV.2381	The situation in the Middle East (1982 Lebanon War)	United States
8 June 1982	S/15185	S/PV.2377	The situation in the Middle East (1982 Lebanon War)	United States
4 June 1982	S/15156/Rev.2	S/PV.2373	Question concerning the situation in the region of the Falkland Islands (Islas Malvinas) (Falklands War)	United Kingdom; United States
20 April 1982	S/14985	S/PV.2357	The situation in the occupied Arab territories (status of Jerusalem)	United States
2 April 1982	S/14943	S/PV.2348	The situation in the occupied Arab territories	United States
2 April 1982	S/14941	S/PV.2347	Letter dated 19 March 1982 from Nicaragua to the Secretary-General (Foreign interference in the Contra War)	United States
20 January 1982	S/14832/Rev.1	S/PV.2329	The situation in the occupied Arab territories (Israeli occupation of the Golan Heights)	United States
31 August 1981	S/14664/Rev.2	S/PV.2300	Complaint by Angola against South Africa (Angolan Civil War)	United States
30 April 1981	S/14459 S/14460/Rev.1 S/14461 S/14462	S/PV.2277	The situation in Namibia (South African Border War)	France; United Kingdom; United States
30 April 1980	S/13911	S/PV.2220	The question of the exercise by the Palestinian people of its inalienable rights (Israeli–Palestinian conflict)	United States
11-13 January 1980	S/13735	S/PV.2191	Letters dated 22 December 1979 from the US to the President of the Security Council US and Iran hostage question	Soviet Union
7-9 January 1980	S/13729	S/PV.2190	Letter dated 3 January 1980 from 52 countries to the President of the Security Council (Soviet–Afghan War)	Soviet Union
16 March 1979	S/13162	S/PV.2129	The situation in South-East Asia and its implications for international peace and security China and Viet Nam border dispute (Cambodian–Vietnamese War and the responding Sino-Vietnamese War)	Soviet Union
15 January 1979	S/13027	S/PV.2112	Telegram dated 3 January 1979 from Democratic Kampuchea to the President of the Security Council (Cambodian–Vietnamese War)	Soviet Union
31 October 1977	S/12310/Rev.1 S/12311/Rev.1 S/12312/Rev.1	S/PV.2045	The question of South Africa (Apartheid, the South African Border War, and South Africa's Nuclear Weapons program)	France; United Kingdom; United States
15 November 1976	S/12226	S/PV.1972	Admission of new Members Viet Nam (Socialist Republic of Viet Nam)	United States
19 October 1976	S/12211	S/PV.1963	The situation in Namibia (South African Border War)	France; United Kingdom; United States
29 June 1976	S/12119	S/PV.1938	The question of the exercise by the Palestinian people of its inalienable rights (Israeli–Palestinian conflict and Arab–Israeli conflict)	United States
23 June 1976	S/12110	S/PV.1932	Admission of new Members Angola (People's Republic of Angola)	United States
25 March 1976	S/12022	S/PV.1899	Request by Libya and Pakistan for consideration of the serious situation arising from recent developments in the occupied Arab territories (Israeli–Palestinian conflict, the status of Jerusalem, and Israeli-occupied territories after the Six-Day War)	United States
6 February 1976	S/11967	S/PV.1888	The situation in the Comoros (regarding France's sovereignty over the island of Mayotte, the 1974 independence referendum, and the upcoming 1976 referendum)	France
26 January 1976	S/11940	S/PV.1879	The Middle East problem including the Palestinian question (concerning the Palestinian right of return and Israeli-occupied territories after the Six-Day War)	United States
8 December 1975	S/11898	S/PV.1862	The situation in the Middle East (Israeli–Lebanese conflict)	United States
30 September 1975	S/11832 S/11833	S/PV.1846	Admission of new Members Democratic Republic of Viet-Nam (North Vietnam) and Republic of South Viet-Nam (Provisional Revolutionary Government)	United States
11 August 1975	S/11795 S/11796	S/PV.1836	Admission of new Members Democratic Republic of Viet-Nam (North Vietnam) and Republic of South Viet-Nam (Provisional Revolutionary Government)	United States
6 June 1975	S/11713	S/PV.1829	The situation in Namibia (South African Border War)	France; United Kingdom; United States
30 October 1974	S/11543	S/PV.1808	Relationship between the UN and South Africa (Apartheid and the South African Border War)	France; United Kingdom; United States
31 July 1974	as amended S/11400	S/PV.1788	The situation in Cyprus (Turkish invasion of Cyprus)	Soviet Union
26 July 1973	S/10974	S/PV.1735	The situation in the Middle East (Israeli–Palestinian conflict and Israeli-occupied territories after the Six-Day War)	United States
22 May 1973	S/10928	S/PV.1716	Question concerning the situation in Southern Rhodesia (South African and Portuguese involvement in the Rhodesian Bush War)	United Kingdom; United States
21 March 1973	S/10931/Rev.1	S/PV.1704	Consideration of measures for the maintenance and strengthening of peace and security in Latin America (Ownership of the Panama Canal per the 1903 Hay–Bunau-Varilla Treaty and increasing desire for Panamanian ownership)	United States
29 September 1972	as amended S/10805/Rev.1	S/PV.1666	Question concerning the situation in Southern Rhodesia (Rhodesia's Unilateral Declaration of Independence and the Rhodesian Bush War)	United Kingdom
10 September 1972	S/10784	S/PV.1662	The situation in the Middle East (1972 Israeli air raid in Syria and Lebanon)	United States
25 August 1972	S/10771	S/PV.1660	Admission of new Members Bangladesh (People's Republic of Bangladesh)	China
4 February 1972	S/10606	S/PV.1639	Consideration of questions relating to Africa of which the Security Council is currently seized and implementation of the council's relevant resolutions the situation in Southern Rhodesia (Rhodesia's Unilateral Declaration of Independence and the Rhodesian Bush War)	United Kingdom
30 December 1971	S/10489	S/PV.1623	Question concerning the situation in Southern Rhodesia (Rhodesia's Unilateral Declaration of Independence and the Rhodesian Bush War)	United Kingdom
13 December 1971	S/10446/Rev.1	S/PV.1613	Letter dated 12 December 1971 from the US to the President of the Security Council concerning the India-Pakistan question (Indo-Pakistani War of 1971)	Soviet Union
5 December 1971	S/10423	S/PV.1607	Letter dated 4 December 1971 from Argentina, Belgium, Burundi, Italy, Japan, Nicaragua, Somalia, the UK and the US to the President of the Security Council concerning the India-Pakistan question (Indo-Pakistani War of 1971)	Soviet Union
4 December 1971	S/10416	S/PV.1606	Letter dated 4 December 1971 from Argentina, Belgium, Burundi, Italy, Japan, Nicaragua, Somalia, the UK and the US to the President of the Security Council concerning the India-Pakistan question (Indo-Pakistani War of 1971)	Soviet Union
10 November 1970	S/9976	S/PV.1556	Question concerning the situation in Southern Rhodesia (Rhodesia's Unilateral Declaration of Independence and the Rhodesian Bush War)	United Kingdom
17 March 1970	S/9696	S/PV.1534	Question concerning the situation in Southern Rhodesia (Rhodesia's Unilateral Declaration of Independence and the Rhodesian Bush War)	United Kingdom; United States
22 August 1968	S/8761	S/PV.1443	Letter dated 21 August 1968 from Canada, Denmark, France, Paraguay, the UK and the US to the President of the Security Council concerning the situation in Czechoslovakia (USSR-led Warsaw Pact invasion of Czechoslovakia)	Soviet Union
4 November 1966	S/7575/Rev.1	S/PV.1319	The Palestine question (Syrian and Israeli clashes as part of War over Water (Jordan river))	Soviet Union
21 December 1964	as amended S/6113	S/PV.1182	The Palestine question (Events of 13 November 1964 as part of War over Water (Jordan river))	Soviet Union
17 September 1964	S/5973	S/PV.1152	Letter dated 3 September 1964 from Malaysia to the President of the Security Council (the Landing at Labis as part of Indonesia–Malaysia confrontation)	Soviet Union
13 September 1963	S/5425/Rev.1	S/PV.1069	The situation in Southern Rhodesia (legitimacy of the Rhodesian Front government and UK rule in Southern Rhodesia prior to the Rhodesian Bush War)	United Kingdom
3 September 1963	S/5407	S/PV.1063	The Palestine question (the murder of two Israel citizens on 19 August 1963 at Almagor by perpetrators entering from Syria)	Soviet Union
22 June 1962	S/5134	S/PV.1016	The India-Pakistan question (India–Pakistan relations)	Soviet Union
18 December 1961	S/5033	S/PV.988	Letter dated 18 December 1961 from Portugal to the President of the Security Council concerning Goa (armed Annexation of Goa by India)	Soviet Union
30 November 1961	S/5006	S/PV.985	Applications for Membership Kuwait	Soviet Union
24 November 1961	S/4985/Rev.1	S/PV.982	Situation in the Republic of the Congo	Soviet Union
7 July 1961	S/4855	S/PV.960	Complaints by Kuwait in respect of the situation arising from the threat by Iraq to the territorial integrity of Kuwait (British military operation to support the newly independent state of Kuwait against territorial claims by Iraq)	Soviet Union
21 February 1961	S/4733/Rev.1	S/PV.942	Situation in the Republic of the Congo	Soviet Union
13 December 1960	S/4578/Rev.1	S/PV.920	Letter dated 13 July 1960 from the Secretary-General to the President of the Security Council the situation in the Congo (Congo Crisis)	Soviet Union
3-4 December 1960	S/4567/Rev.1	S/PV.911	Applications for membership Mauritania (Islamic Republic of Mauritania)	Soviet Union
17 September 1960	S/4523	S/PV.906	Letter dated 13 July 1960 from the Secretary-General to the President of the Security Council concerning the situation in the Congo (Congo Crisis)	Soviet Union
26 July 1960	S/4409/Rev.1	S/PV.883	Telegrams dated 13 July 1960 from the USSR to the Secretary-General (Soviet MiG fighter in the Barents Sea shot down a US RB-47 on 1 July 1960)	Soviet Union
26 July 1960	S/4411	S/PV.843	Telegrams dated 13 July 1960 from the USSR to the Secretary-General (Soviet MiG fighter in the Barents Sea shot down a US RB-47 on 1 July 1960)	Soviet Union
9 December 1958	S/4129/Rev.1 S/4130/Rev.1	S/PV.843	Admission of new Members Republic of Korea (South Korea) and Viet-Nam (Republic of Vietnam)	Soviet Union
22 July 1958	S/4055/Rev.1	S/PV.837	Letter dated 22 May 1958 from Lebanon and Letter dated 17 July 1958 from Jordan to the President of the Security Council Complaints by Lebanon and Jordan concerning the interference in their internal affairs by the United Arab Republic (concerning the 1958 Lebanon crisis)	Soviet Union
18 July 1958	S/4050/Rev.1	S/PV.834	Letter dated 22 May 1958 from Lebanon and Letter dated 17 July 1958 from Jordan to the President of the Security Council Complaints by Lebanon and Jordan concerning the interference in their internal affairs by the United Arab Republic (concerning the 1958 Lebanon crisis)	Soviet Union
2 May 1958	S/3995	S/PV.817	Complaint by USSR in a letter to the President of the Security Council dated 18 April 1958 entitled Urgent measures to put an end to flights by US military aircraft armed with atomic and hydrogen bombs in the direction of the frontiers of the Soviet Union (Operation Head Start)	Soviet Union
9 September 1957	S/3884 S/3885	S/PV.790	Admission of new Members Republic of Korea (South Korea) and Viet-Nam (Republic of Vietnam)	Soviet Union
20 February 1957	S/3787	S/PV.773	The India-Pakistan question (Kashmir conflict and India–Pakistan relations)	Soviet Union
4 November 1956	S/3730/Rev.1	S/PV.754	Letter dated 27 October 1956 from France, the UK and the US to the President of the Security Council concerning the situation in Hungary (Soviet involvement in the Hungarian Revolution of 1956)	Soviet Union
30 October 1956	S/3713/Rev.1	S/PV.750	Letter dated 29 October 1956 from the US to the President of the Security Council concerning the Palestine question (Suez Crisis)	France; United Kingdom
30 October 1956	S/3710	S/PV.749	Letter dated 29 October 1956 from the US to the President of the Security Council concerning the Palestine question (Suez Crisis)	France; United Kingdom
13 October 1956	S/3671	S/PV.743	Situation created by the unilateral action of the Egyptian Government in bringing to an end the system of international operation of the Suez Canal, which was confirmed by the Suez Canal Convention of 1888	Soviet Union
15 December 1955	S/3510	S/PV.706	Admission of new Members Japan	Soviet Union
14 December 1955	S/3509	S/PV.705	Admission of new Members	Soviet Union
20 June 1954	S/3236/Rev.1	S/PV.675	Cablegram dated 19 June 1954 from Guatemala to the President of the Security Council (CIA backed 1954 Guatemalan coup d'état)	Soviet Union
18 June 1954	S/3229	S/PV.674	Letter dated 29 May 1954 from Thailand to the President of the Security Council (Viet Minh incursion into Thailand)	Soviet Union
29 March 1954	S/3188/Corr.1	S/PV.664	The Palestine question (Egypt's non-compliance with Resolution 95)	Soviet Union
22 January 1954	S/3151/Rev.2	S/PV.656	The Palestine question (concerning the DMZ of the Israel–Syria Mixed Armistice Commission)	Soviet Union
13 March 1953	S/PV.613	S/PV.613	Appointment of Secretary-General	Soviet Union
19 September 1952	S/2758 S/2759 S/2760	S/PV.603	Admission of new Members Cambodia (Kingdom of Cambodia), Laos (Kingdom of Laos), and Vietnam (State of Vietnam)	Soviet Union
18 September 1952	S/2754	S/PV.602	Admission of new Members Japan (Japan)	Soviet Union
16 September 1952	S/2483	S/PV.600	Admission of new Members Libya (Kingdom of Libya)	Soviet Union
9 July 1952	S/2688	S/PV.590	Question of a request for investigation of alleged bacterial warfare (Allegations of biological warfare in the Korean War)	Soviet Union
3 July 1952	S/2671	S/PV.587	Question of a request for investigation of alleged bacterial warfare (Allegations of biological warfare in the Korean War)	Soviet Union
6 February 1952	S/2443	S/PV.573	Admission of new Members Italy	Soviet Union
30 November 1950	S/1894	S/PV.530	Complaint of armed invasion of Taiwan (Formosa); Complaint of aggression upon the Republic of Korea (Korean War)	Soviet Union
12 September 1950	S/1752	S/PV.501	Complaint of bombing by air forces of the territory of China (US mistakenly bombs Chinese airstrip on 27 August 1950 during the Korean War)	Soviet Union
6 September 1950	S/1653	S/PV.496	Complaint of aggression upon the Republic of Korea (Korean War)	Soviet Union
13 December 1949	S/1431	S/PV.456	The Indonesian question	Soviet Union
18 October 1949	S/1399/Rev.1 S/1408/Rev.1	S/PV.452	Regulation and reduction of armaments and armed forces (United Nations Commission on Conventional Armaments)	Soviet Union
11 October 1949	S/1398	S/PV.450	Regulation and reduction of armaments and armed forces (United Nations Commission on Conventional Armaments)	Soviet Union
13 September 1949	S/1331 S/1332 S/1333 S/1334 S/1335 S/1336 S/1337	S/PV.443	Application for Membership Ceylon (Dominion of Ceylon), Finland, Ireland, Italy, Portugal, and Transjordan (Jordan)	Soviet Union
7 September 1949	S/1385	S/PV.439	Application for Membership Nepal	Soviet Union
8 April 1949	S/1305	S/PV.423	Application for Membership Republic of Korea (South Korea)	Soviet Union
15 December 1948	S/PV.384	S/PV.384	Application for Membership Ceylon (Dominion of Ceylon)	Soviet Union
25 October 1948	S/1048	S/PV.372	Identical notifications dated 29 September 1948 from France, the UK and the US to the Secretary-General (Berlin Blockade)	Soviet Union
18 August 1948	S/PV.351	S/PV.351	Application for Membership Ceylon (Dominion of Ceylon)	Soviet Union
22 June 1948	S/836	S/PV.325	Letter dated 26 May 1948 from the Chairman of the Atomic Energy Commission to the President of the Security Council transmitting the Third Report of the commission (United Nations Atomic Energy Commission)	Soviet Union
24 May 1948	S/PV.303	S/PV.303	Letter dated 12 Mar 1948 from Chile to the Secretary-General events in Czechoslovakia preliminary question (Soviet backed 1948 Czechoslovak coup d'état)	Soviet Union
10 April 1948	S/PV.279	S/PV.279	Application for Membership Italy	Soviet Union
1 October 1947	S/PV.206	S/PV.206	Application for Membership Finland and Italy	Soviet Union
15 September 1947	S/552	S/PV.202	The Greek question concerning the situation in northern Greece (Greek Civil War)	Soviet Union
25 August 1947	S/PV.194	S/PV.194	The Indonesian question	French Fourth Republic
21 August 1947	S/PV.190	S/PV.190	Application for Membership Austria (Allied-occupied Austria) and Italy	Soviet Union
19 August 1947	S/486	S/PV.188	The Greek question Greek frontier incidents (Greek Civil War concerning neighbors Yugoslavia, Albania, and Bulgaria)	Soviet Union
19 August 1947	S/471; S/471/Add.1	S/PV.188	The Greek question Greek frontier incidents (Greek Civil War concerning neighbors Yugoslavia, Albania, and Bulgaria)	Soviet Union
18 August 1947	S/PV.186	S/PV.186	Application for Membership Ireland, Portugal, Transjordan (Jordan)	Soviet Union
29 July 1947	S/PV.170	S/PV.170	The Greek question Greek frontier incidents (Greek Civil War concerning neighbors Yugoslavia, Albania, and Bulgaria)	Soviet Union
25 March 1947	S/PV.122	S/PV.122	Incidents in the Corfu Channel	Soviet Union
20 September 1946	S/PV.70	S/PV.70	Telegram dated 24 August 1946 from the Ukrainian Soviet Socialist Republic to the Secretary-General. The telegram addresses two issues, the border incidents provoked by the Greek armed forces at the Albanian border, and the aggravation of the situation by the presence of British troops. (Greek Civil War)	Soviet Union
29 August 1946	S/PV.57	S/PV.57	Application for Membership Ireland, Portugal, Transjordan (Jordan)	Soviet Union
26 June 1946	S/PV.49	S/PV.49	The Spanish question (Specifically, the question of actions to be taken with regards to Francoist Spain)	Soviet Union
18 June 1946	S/PV.45	S/PV.47	The Spanish question (Specifically, the question of actions to be taken with regards to Francoist Spain)	Soviet Union
16 February 1946	S/PV.23	S/PV.23	Letter from the Heads of the Lebanese and Syrian delegations to the Secretary-General dated 4 February 1946. The letter was in regard to the withdrawal of French and British troops from their territories.	Soviet Union

== Vetoes by Country ==
Raw data

== Republic of China ==
The lone veto ever cast by the Republic of China, blocking the General Assembly membership of Mongolia, was not its own resolution and does not appear in the above table. Instead, the membership applications of 18 countries were being discussed, and the Soviet Union initially demanded 18 different resolutions in the order they applied (which would place Albania and Mongolia first). Other Security Council members objected, and the President of the Security Council (New Zealand) offered a compromise where all 18 applicants would be in one resolution, but each applicant would be voted on separately as though it were an amendment, followed by a larger vote on the whole resolution. The Soviet Union agreed to the compromise on the condition that it was worded so that the General Assembly had to either admit all 18 countries or none of them.

However, after the Republic of China vetoed the amendment containing Mongolia, the Soviet Union cast 13 more vetoes on all the remaining applicants except those in Eastern Europe. (Note: The Soviet Union also vetoed amendments for South Korea and South Vietnam, which were not part of the original 18 and were voted on before Albania due to procedural rules.) The larger vote on the whole resolution, now containing only four Eastern European countries, then failed without veto as the Soviet Union was the only member to vote in favour.

== See also ==
- United Nations
- United Nations Security Council
- United Nations Security Council veto power
- Vetoed United Nations Security Council resolutions on Syria
