= Lists of United Nations Security Council resolutions =

United Nations Security Council resolutions are measures adopted by the fifteen members of the Security Council of the United Nations (UNSC); the UN body charged with "primary responsibility for the maintenance of international peace and security".

== Resolutions by number ==
All resolutions are included in these chronological lists.

- 1 to 100 (25 January 1946 – 27 October 1953)
- 101 to 200 (24 November 1953 – 15 March 1965)
- 201 to 300 (19 March 1965 – 12 October 1971)
- 301 to 400 (20 October 1971 – 7 December 1976)
- 401 to 500 (14 December 1976 – 28 January 1982)
- 501 to 600 (25 February 1982 – 19 October 1987)
- 601 to 700 (30 October 1987 – 17 June 1991)
- 701 to 800 (31 July 1991 – 8 January 1993)
- 801 to 900 (8 January 1993 – 4 March 1994)
- 901 to 1000 (4 March 1994 – 23 June 1995)
- 1001 to 1100 (30 June 1995 – 27 March 1997)
- 1101 to 1200 (28 March 1997 – 30 September 1998)
- 1201 to 1300 (15 October 1998 – 31 May 2000)
- 1301 to 1400 (31 May 2000 – 28 March 2002)
- 1401 to 1500 (28 March 2002 – 14 August 2003)
- 1501 to 1600 (26 August 2003 – 4 May 2005)
- 1601 to 1700 (31 May 2005 – 10 August 2006)
- 1701 to 1800 (11 August 2006 – 20 February 2008)
- 1801 to 1900 (20 February 2008 – 16 December 2009)
- 1901 to 2000 (16 December 2009 – 27 July 2011)
- 2001 to 2100 (28 July 2011 – 25 April 2013)
- 2101 to 2200 (25 April 2013 – 12 February 2015)
- 2201 to 2300 (15 February 2015 – 26 July 2016)
- 2301 to 2400 (26 July 2016 – 8 February 2018)
- 2401 to 2500 (24 February 2018 – 4 December 2019)
- 2501 to 2600 (16 December 2019 – 15 October 2021)
- 2601 to 2700 (29 October 2021 – 19 October 2023)
- 2701 to 2800 (19 October 2023 – 13 November 2025)
- 2801 to 2900 (14 November 2025 – present)

== Resolutions by year ==
These links go directly to a year (or the bottom of the page) in one of the lists in the Resolutions by number section. Some years continue in the next list.

- 1946
- 1947
- 1948
- 1949
- 1950
- 1951
- 1952
- 1953
- 1954
- 1955
- 1956
- 1957
- 1958
- 1959
- 1960
- 1961
- 1962
- 1963
- 1964
- 1965
- 1966
- 1967
- 1968
- 1969
- 1970
- 1971
- 1972
- 1973
- 1974
- 1975
- 1976
- 1977
- 1978
- 1979
- 1980
- 1981
- 1982
- 1983
- 1984
- 1985
- 1986
- 1987
- 1988
- 1989
- 1990
- 1991
- 1992
- 1993
- 1994
- 1995
- 1996
- 1997
- 1998
- 1999
- 2000
- 2001
- 2002
- 2003
- 2004
- 2005
- 2006
- 2007
- 2008
- 2009
- 2010
- 2011
- 2012
- 2013
- 2014
- 2015
- 2016
- 2017
- 2018
- 2019
- 2020
- 2021
- 2022
- 2023
- 2024
- 2025
- 2026

== Resolutions by topic ==
These are lists of resolutions about the same topic. There are more topics in Category:United Nations Security Council resolutions by topic but it only shows a link to resolutions with their own article. As of 2023 that is nearly all resolutions until 2013 but few since then.

- Cyprus
- Iran
- Iraq
- Israel
- Lebanon
- Nagorno-Karabakh conflict
- North Korea
- Palestine
- Syria
- Western Sahara
- Yemen
- Conflicts in former Yugoslavia

== Vetoed resolutions ==
Vetoed resolutions are not adopted so they are not included in the earlier lists.

- List of vetoed resolutions
- Vetoed resolutions on Syria
- Draft resolution on Israeli settlements, 2011
