= United Nations Supervision Mission in Syria =

United Nations peacekeeping mission in Syria

- Abbreviation: UNSMIS
- Formation: 21 April 2012
- Head: Robert Mood until date Babacar Gaye
- Parent organization: United Nations Security Council

The United Nations Supervision Mission in Syria (UNSMIS) was a United Nations peacekeeping mission in Syria, set up in 2012 as a result of United Nations Security Council Resolution 2043 in response to the Syrian Civil War. It was commanded by Norwegian Major General Robert Mood until 20 July 2012 followed by Lieutenant General Babacar Gaye from Senegal. Although observers remain in the country, Mood suspended their mission on June 16, 2012, citing "escalating violence". Observers will conduct no further patrols and stay in their current positions until the suspension is lifted. On 20 July 2012, the Security Council extended UNSMIS for a final period of 30 days. According to resolution 2059, the Council would only consider more extensions in the event that the Secretary-General reports and the Security Council confirms the cessation of the use of heavy weapons and a reduction in the level of violence sufficient by all sides to allow UNSMIS to implement its mandate.

== Make-up and strength ==
Resolution 2043 authorizes up to 304 unarmed military observers, plus an appropriate civilian component. As of 30 June 2012, UNSMIS consisted of 280 military observers, 81 international civilian staff and 41 local civilian staff. Military personnel came from Armenia, Bangladesh, Benin, Brazil, Burkina Faso, Burundi, Cambodia, Chad, China, Croatia, Czech Republic, Denmark, Ecuador, Egypt, Fiji, Finland, France, Ghana, Indonesia, Ireland, Italy, Jordan, Kenya, Kyrgyzstan, Mauritania, Morocco, Nepal, Netherlands, New Zealand, Niger, Nigeria, North Korea, Norway, Paraguay, Philippines, Romania, Russia, Senegal, Slovenia, Sweden, Switzerland, Togo, Vietnam, Yemen and Zimbabwe.

On 25 July 2012, Under-Secretary-General for Peacekeeping Operations Hervé Ladsous announced that about half of the military observers have been sent back to their countries.

On August 16, France's UN Ambassador Gerard Araud, the current Security Council president, said the conditions to extend the mission beyond August 20, among which a significant reduction of violence, were not met and the mission would end. Russia organised new UN meetings in New York on Friday, August 17, and called on all sides to end the violence.

On 20 July, the Security Council extended UNSMIS for a final period of 30 days. According to resolution S/RES/2059, the Council would only consider further extensions to the mission in the event that the Secretary-General reports and the Security Council confirms the cessation of the use of heavy weapons and a reduction in the level of violence sufficient by all sides to allow the UNSMIS monitors to implement their mandate. The two conditions set by the Council were not met. This was reported in a Secretary-General's letter to the Security Council on 10 August, in which he also set forth his observations on the future work of the United Nations in Syria.

== See also ==
- United Nations Security Council Resolution 2043
- United Nations Security Council Resolution 2059
- Syrian peace process
