= United Nations Security Council Resolution 2043 =

UN Security Council Resolution 2043
- Flag of Syria
- Date: 21 April 2012
- Meeting no.: 6,756
- Code: S/RES/2043 (Document)
- Subject: Syrian uprising
- Voting summary: 15 voted for; None voted against; None abstained
- Result: Adopted

Security Council composition
- Permanent members: China; France; Russia; United Kingdom; United States
- Non-permanent members: Azerbaijan; Colombia; Germany; Guatemala; India; Morocco; Pakistan; Portugal; South Africa; Togo

United Nations Security Council Resolution 2043 was unanimously adopted on 21 April 2012.

The resolution resulted in the setting up of the United Nations Supervision Mission in Syria to observe the implementation of the Kofi Annan peace plan for Syria on the Syrian Civil War. The United Nations Supervision Mission in Syria was frozen in early June 2012, following an increasingly unstable and violent situation in Syria.

== See also ==
- List of United Nations Security Council Resolutions 2001 to 2100
- List of United Nations resolutions concerning Syria
