= List of United Nations Security Council Resolutions 2101 to 2200 =

This is a list of United Nations Security Council Resolutions 2101 to 2200 adopted between 25 April 2013 and 12 February 2015.

Resolution	Date	Vote	Concerns
2101	25 April 2013	15–0–0	Situation in Côte d'Ivoire
2102	2 May 2013	15–0–0	Situation in Somalia
2103	22 May 2013	15–0–0	Situation in Guinea-Bissau
2104	29 May 2013	15–0–0	Separation of Sudan and South Sudan
2105	5 June 2013	15–0–0	Extends mandate of expert panel monitoring sanctions against Iran
2106	24 June 2013	15–0–0	Reaffirming 14 resolutions
2107	27 June 2013	15–0–0	Situation of Iraq and Kuwait
2108	27 June 2013	15–0–0	Tensions in the Middle East
2109	11 July 2013	15–0–0	Situation in Sudan and South Sudan
2110	24 July 2013	15–0–0	Situation in Iraq
2111	24 July 2013	15–0–0	Situation in Somalia
2112	30 July 2013	15–0–0	Situation in Côte d'Ivoire
2113	30 July 2013	15–0–0	Reports of the Secretary-General on Sudan
2114	30 July 2013	13–0–2 (abstentions: Azerbaijan, Pakistan)	Situation in Cyprus, extends mandate of UNFICYP
2115	29 August 2013	15–0–0	Situation in the Middle East, extends mandate of UNIFIL
2116	18 September 2013	15–0–0	Situation in Liberia
2117	26 September 2013	14–0–1 (abstention: Russian Federation)	Small arms and light weapons, Arms Trade Treaty
2118	27 September 2013	15–0–0	On chemical weapons in Syria
2119	10 October 2013	15–0–0	Situation in Haiti
2120	10 October 2013	15–0–0	Situation in Afghanistan
2121	10 October 2013	15–0–0	Situation in the Central African Republic
2122	18 October 2013	15–0–0	Reaffirming 6 resolutions
2123	12 November 2013	15–0–0	Situation in the former Yugoslavia
2124	12 November 2013	15–0–0	Situation in Somalia
2125	18 November 2013	15–0–0	Situation in Somalia
2126	25 November 2013	15–0–0	Situation in Sudan and South Sudan
2127	5 December 2013	15–0–0	Situation in the Central African Republic, creation of MISCA
2128	10 December 2013	15–0–0	Commending the governmental progress in Liberia
2129	17 December 2013	15–0–0	Reaffirming combatting terrorism
2130	18 December 2013	15–0–0	Reaffirming the International Criminal Tribunal for the former Yugoslavia
2131	18 December 2013	15–0–0	Situation in the Middle East
2132	24 December 2013	15–0–0	Situation in South Sudan
2133	27 January 2014	15–0–0	On threats to international peace and security caused by terrorist acts
2134	28 January 2014	15–0–0	Situation in Central African Republic, extends mandate of BINUCA
2135	30 January 2014	15–0–0	Situation in Cyprus, extends mandate of UNFICYP
2136	30 January 2014	15–0–0	Situation in Democratic Republic of the Congo
2137	13 February 2014	15–0–0	Situation in Burundi
2138	13 February 2014	15–0–0	Situation in Darfur
2139	22 February 2014	15–0–0	Humanitarian aid access in Syria
2140	26 February 2014	15–0–0	Situation in Yemen
2141	5 March 2014	15–0–0	Non-proliferation / North Korea
2142	5 March 2014	15–0–0	Situation in Somalia
2143	7 March 2014	15–0–0	Children and armed conflict
2144	14 March 2014	15–0–0	Situation in Libya
2145	17 March 2014	15–0–0	Situation in Afghanistan
2146	19 March 2014	15–0–0	Situation in Libya
2147	28 March 2014	15–0–0	Situation of the Democratic Republic of the Congo
2148	3 April 2014	15–0–0	Situation in Sudan
2149	10 April 2014	15–0–0	Situation in Central African Republic
2150	16 April 2014	15–0–0	Prevention and fight against genocide and other serious crimes under international law
2151	28 April 2014	15–0–0	Security sector reform
2152	29 April 2014	15–0–0	Situation in Western Sahara
2153	29 April 2014	15–0–0	Situation in Côte d'Ivoire
2154	8 May 2014	15–0–0	Creation of the Captain Mbaye Diagne Medal for Exceptional Courage
2155	27 May 2014	15–0–0	Situation in South Sudan
2156	29 May 2014	15–0–0	Separation of Sudan and South Sudan
2157	29 May 2014	15–0–0	Situation in Guinea-Bissau
2158	29 May 2014	15–0–0	Situation in Somalia
2159	9 June 2014	15–0–0	Extends mandate of expert panel monitoring sanctions against Iran
2160	17 June 2014	15–0–0	Threats to international peace and security caused by terrorist acts by Taliban
2161	17 June 2014	15–0–0	Threats to international peace and security caused by terrorist acts by Al-Qaida
2162	25 June 2014	15–0–0	Extends the mandate of UN Operation in Côte d'Ivoire (UNOCI)
2163	25 June 2014	15–0–0	Extends the mandate of the UN Disengagement Observer Force (UNDOF)
2164	25 June 2014	15–0–0	Extends the mandate of the UN Multidimensional Integrated Stabilization Mission in Mali (MINUSMA)
2165	14 July 2014	15–0–0	Humanitarian situation in Syria and the establishment of a monitoring mechanism
2166	21 July 2014	15–0–0	Ukraine and Malaysia Airlines Flight 17
2167	28 July 2014	15–0–0	Reaffirms support for African Union and European Union collaboration with peacekeeping operations
2168	30 July 2014	15–0–0	Cyprus and extends mission of UNFICYP
2169	30 July 2014	15–0–0	Condemns ISIL, reaffirms and extends the mandate of UNAMI
2170	15 August 2014	15–0–0	Threats to international peace and security caused by ISIL and al-Nusra Front
2171	21 August 2014	15–0–0	Conflict prevention
2172	26 August 2014	15–0–0	Israel, Lebanon, UNIFIL
2173	27 August 2014	15–0–0	Extends mandate of AU/UN hybrid peacekeeping operation in Darfur
2174	27 August 2014	15–0–0	Situation in Libya
2175	29 August 2014	15–0–0	Protection of humanitarian personnel and UN and associated personnel in armed conflict
2176	15 September 2014	15–0–0	Extends mandate of United Nations Mission in Liberia (UNMIL)
2177	18 September 2014	15–0–0	The creation United Nations Mission for Ebola Emergency Response (UNMEER)
2178	24 September 2014	15–0–0	Threats to international peace and security caused by terrorist acts
2179	14 October 2014	15–0–0	Reports of the Secretary-General on the Sudan and South Sudan
2180	14 October 2014	15–0–0	Haiti
2181	21 October 2014	15–0–0	The Situation in the Central African Republic
2182	24 October 2014	13–0–2 (abstentions: Jordan, Russian Federation)	The Situation in Somalia
2183	11 November 2014	14–0–1 (abstention: Russian Federation)	The Situation in Bosnia and Herzegovina
2184	12 November 2014	15–0–0	The Situation in Somalia
2185	20 November 2014	15–0–0	Peacekeeping Operations
2186	25 November 2014	15–0–0	The Situation in Guinea-Bissau
2187	25 November 2014	15–0–0	Reports of the Secretary-General on the Sudan and South Sudan
2188	9 December 2014	15–0–0	The Situation in Liberia
2189	12 December 2014	15–0–0	The Situation in Afghanistan
2190	15 December 2014	15–0–0	The Situation in Liberia
2191	17 December 2014	15–0–0	The situation in the Middle East
2192	18 December 2014	15–0–0	The situation in the Middle East
2193	18 December 2014	14–0–1 (abstention: Russian Federation)	International Tribunal - Yugoslavia
2194	18 December 2014	15–0–0	International Tribunal - Rwanda
2195	19 December 2014	15–0–0	Threats to international peace and security
2196	22 January 2015	15–0–0	Situation in the Central African Republic
2197	29 January 2015	15–0–0	Situation in Cyprus
2198	29 January 2015	15–0–0	Situation in the Democratic Republic of the Congo
2199	12 February 2015	15–0–0	Threats to international peace and security caused by terrorism
2200	12 February 2015	15–0–0	Situation in South Sudan and Sudan

== See also ==
- Lists of United Nations Security Council resolutions
- List of United Nations Security Council Resolutions 2001 to 2100
- List of United Nations Security Council Resolutions 2201 to 2300
