= United Nations Security Council Resolution 2093 =

UN Security Council Resolution 2093
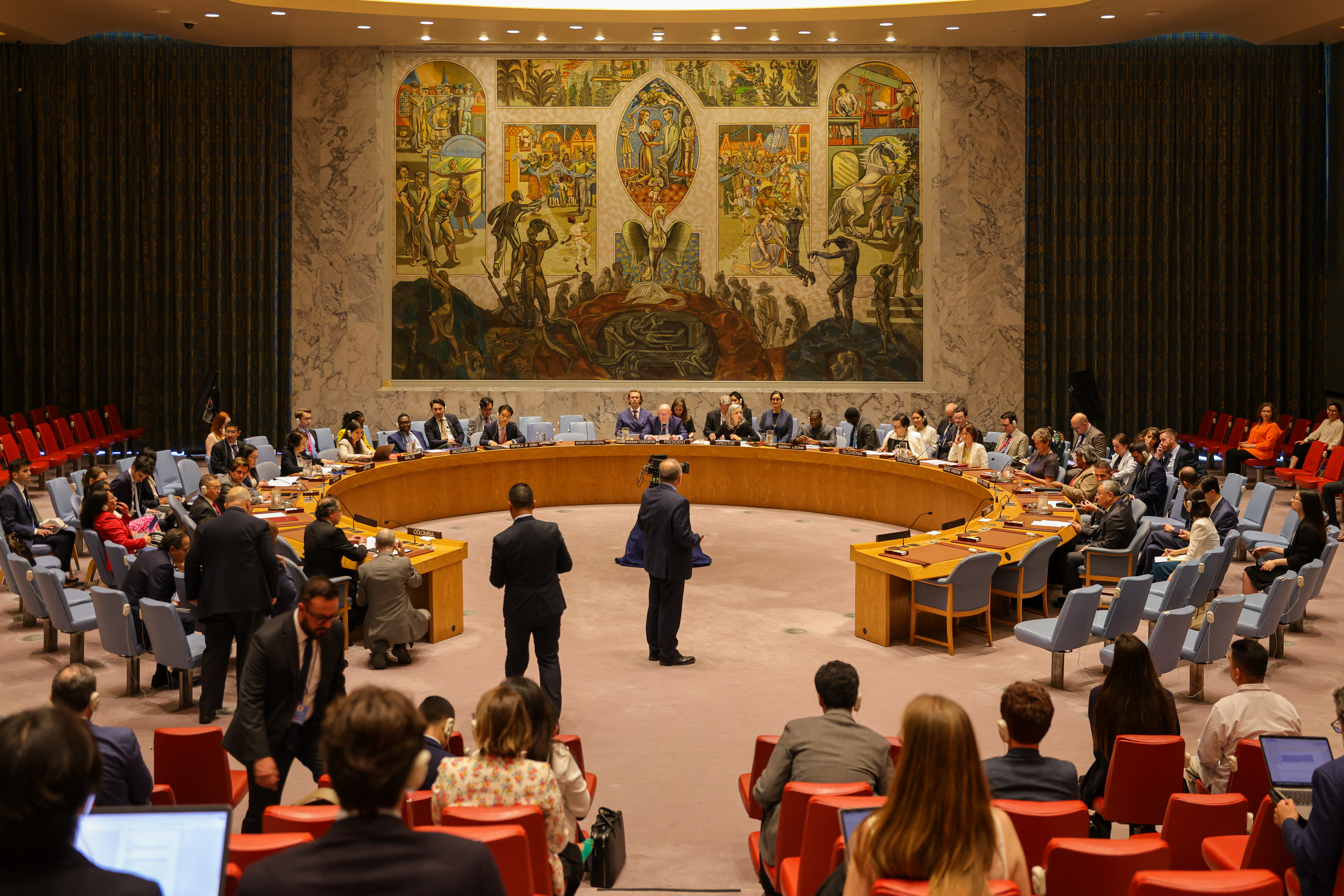
- UN Security Council
- Date: 6 March 2013
- Meeting no.: 6,929
- Code: S/RES/2093 (Document)
- Subject: The situation in Somalia
- Voting summary: 15 voted for; None voted against; None abstained
- Result: Adopted

Security Council composition
- Permanent members: China; France; Russia; United Kingdom; United States
- Non-permanent members: Argentina; Australia; Azerbaijan; Guatemala; South Korea; Luxembourg; Morocco; Pakistan; Rwanda; Togo

United Nations Security Council Resolution 2093 was unanimously adopted on 6 March 2013.

== Resolution ==
Upon assuming office, President Hassan Sheikh Mohamud and his Cabinet in the new Federal Government of Somalia resumed efforts by Somali and international stakeholders to end the 21-year UN arms embargo on Somalia, which was at the time the oldest such global weapons blockade. The Security Council had imposed the prohibition in 1992, shortly after the start of the civil war and the toppling of the Siad Barre regime, in order to stop the flow of weapons to feuding militia groups. An eventual repeal of the embargo had been among the future objectives of the signatories in the transitional Roadmap political process of 2011-2012. Mohamud's government, Somali security analysts and military experts argued that lifting the ban on the procurement of arms would facilitate the Somali authorities' attempts at strengthening the Somali Armed Forces, and would more effectively equip the military to quash the remnants of the Islamist insurgency. The United States, African Union, Arab League, and Intergovernmental Authority on Development all backed the proposal. In March 2013, UN Secretary-General Ban Ki-moon likewise urged Security Council members to vote to remove the sanctions so as to help the Somali authorities fortify their security apparatus and consolidate military gains.

Although the United Kingdom and France reportedly expressed reservations over increasing the general flow of arms into Somalia, UK officials began drafting a resolution to ease the embargo on weapons purchases by the Somali government for a provisional period of one year. The draft resolution would require either the Somali authorities or the state supplying the military equipment to notify the council "at least five days in advance of any deliveries of weapons and military equipment[...] providing details of such deliveries and assistance and the specific place of delivery in Somalia". Additionally, the proposal mandates that the Somali government should routinely provide updates on the army's structural status, as well as information on the extant infrastructure and protocols designed to ensure the weaponry's safe delivery, storage and maintenance.

At its 6 March 2013 meeting, the 15-member UN Security Council unanimously approved resolution 2093 to suspend the arms embargo on Somalia for a one year period. The endorsement officially lifts the purchase ban on light weapons, but retains certain restrictions on the procurement of heavy arms such as surface-to-air missiles, howitzers and cannons. It stipulates that the blockade "shall not apply to deliveries of weapons or military equipment or the provision of advice, assistance or training, intended solely for the development of the security forces of the Federal Government of Somalia, and to provide security for the Somali people, except in relation to deliveries of the items set out in the annex to this resolution." The repeal adds that the arms will be supplied "solely for the development of the security forces of the Federal Government of Somalia may not be resold to, transferred to, or made available for use by, any individual or entity not in the service of the Security Forces of the Federal Government of Somalia." It was slated to be reviewed in 2014.

The resolution also extended the mandate of the African Union Mission in Somalia (AMISOM) for another year, until 28 February 2014. Similarly, it decided that the United Nations Political Office for Somalia (UNPOS) had fulfilled its mandate and should be replaced by a new expanded special political mission as soon as possible; that mission emerged as the United Nations Assistance Mission in Somalia (UNSOM) under Security Council resolution 2102 of 2 May 2013.

== See also ==
- List of United Nations Security Council Resolutions 2001 to 2100
