= United Nations Security Council Resolution 2117 =

UN Security Council Resolution 2117
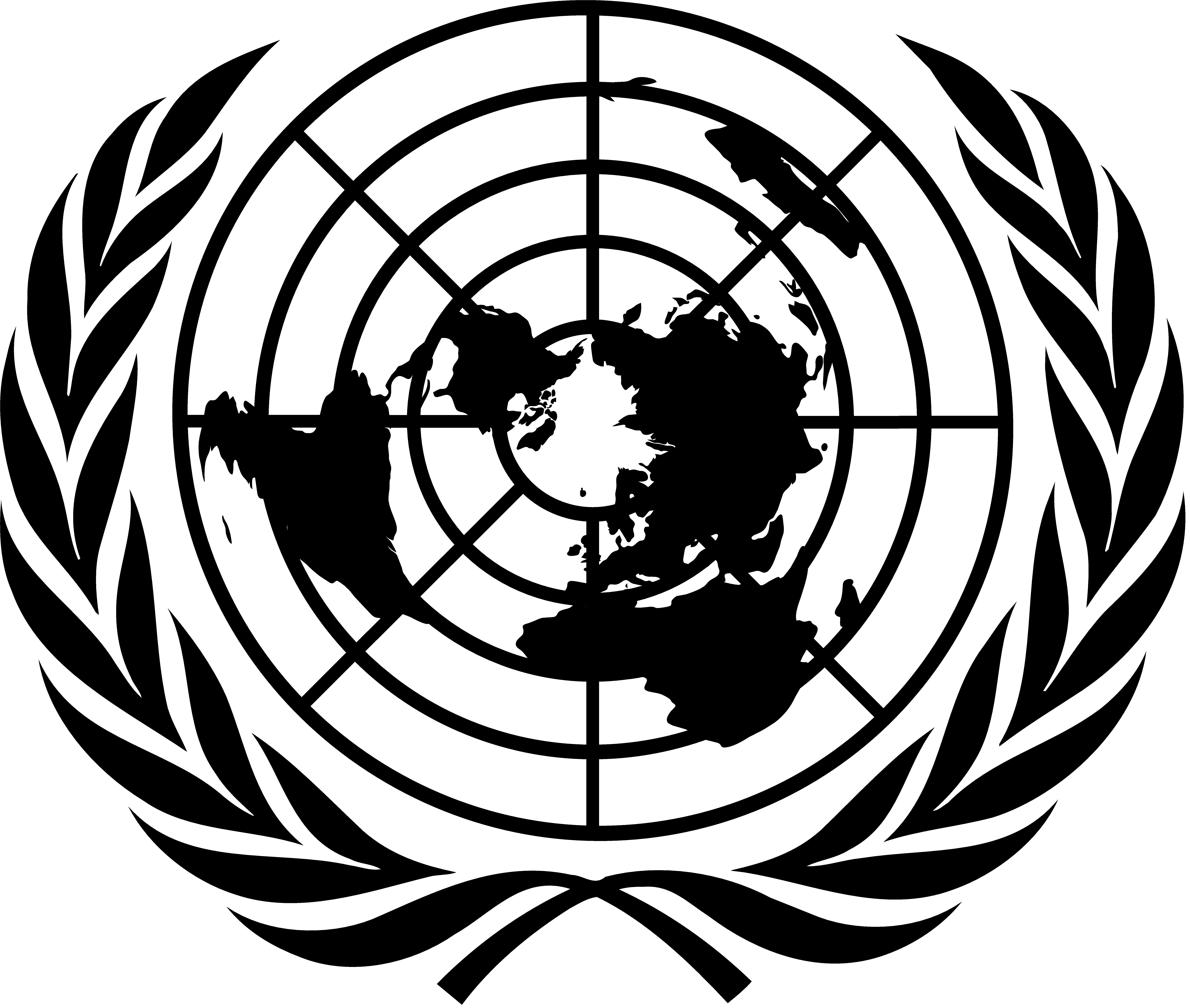
- UN emblem
- Date: 26 September 2013
- Meeting no.: 7036
- Code: S/RES/2117 (Document)
- Subject: Small arms and light weapons
- Voting summary: 14 voted for; None voted against; 1 abstained
- Result: Adopted

Security Council composition
- Permanent members: China; France; Russia; United Kingdom; United States
- Non-permanent members: Argentina; Australia; Azerbaijan; Guatemala; South Korea; Luxembourg; Morocco; Pakistan; Rwanda; Togo

United Nations Security Council resolution 2117 was adopted in 2013. Russia abstained.

== See also ==
- List of United Nations Security Council Resolutions 2101 to 2200 (2013–2015)
