= United Nations Security Council Resolution 2115 =

UN Security Council Resolution 2115
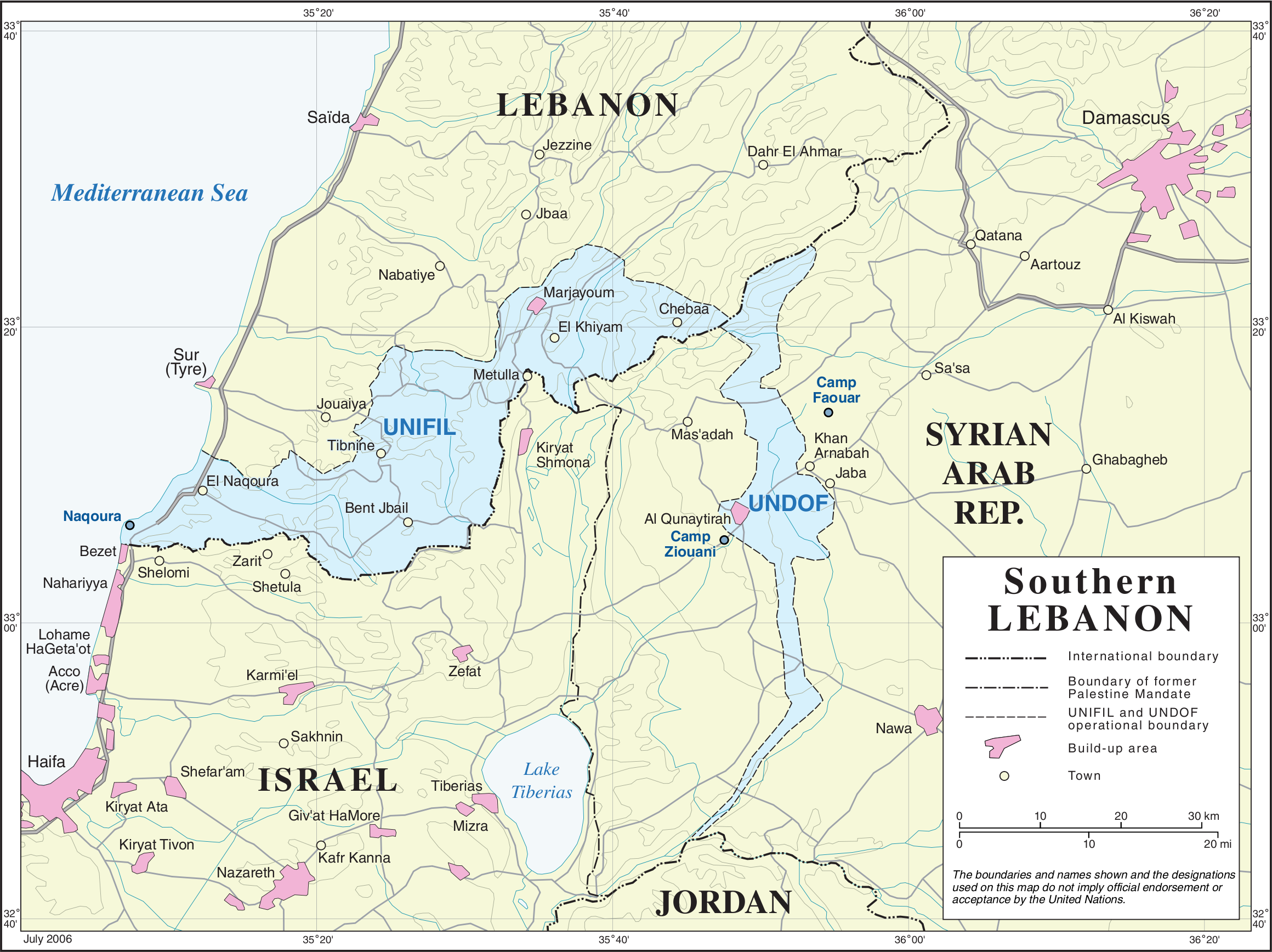
- UNIFIL and UNDOF map
- Date: 29 August 2013
- Meeting no.: 7025
- Code: S/RES/2115 (Document)
- Subject: Middle East
- Voting summary: 15 voted for; None voted against; None abstained
- Result: Adopted

Security Council composition
- Permanent members: China; France; Russia; United Kingdom; United States
- Non-permanent members: Argentina; Australia; Azerbaijan; Guatemala; South Korea; Luxembourg; Morocco; Pakistan; Rwanda; Togo

United Nations Security Council Resolution 2115 was adopted on 29 August 2013. It extended the mandate of UNIFIL until 31 August 2014.

== See also ==
- List of United Nations Security Council Resolutions 2101 to 2200 (2013–2015)
