= United Nations Security Council Resolution 2121 =

UN Security Council Resolution 2121
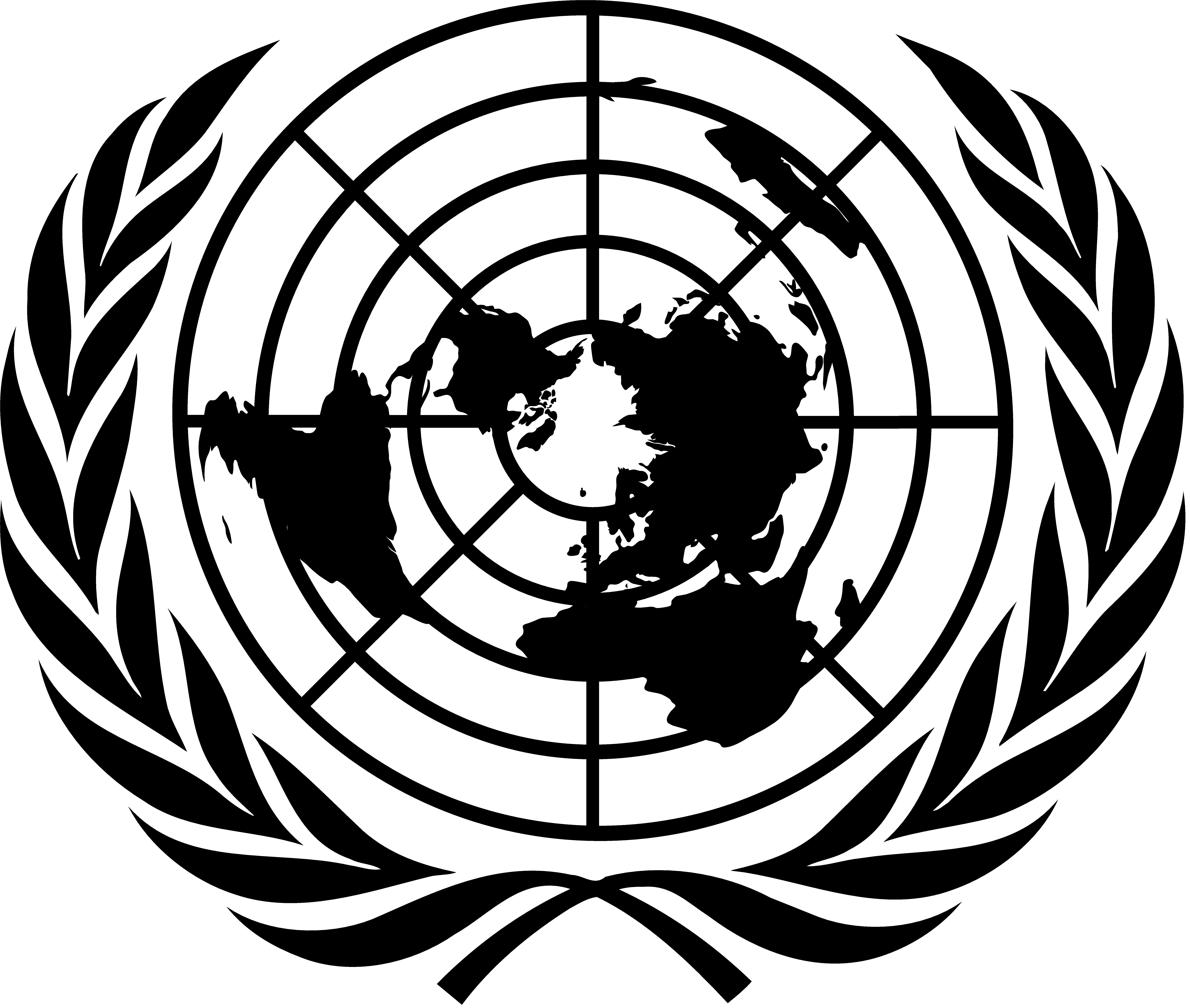
- UN emblem
- Date: 10 October 2013
- Meeting no.: 7,042
- Code: S/RES/2121 (Document)
- Subject: Central African Republic
- Voting summary: 15 voted for; None voted against; None abstained
- Result: Adopted

Security Council composition
- Permanent members: China; France; Russia; United Kingdom; United States
- Non-permanent members: Argentina; Australia; Azerbaijan; Guatemala; South Korea; Luxembourg; Morocco; Pakistan; Rwanda; Togo

United Nations Security Council resolution 2121 was adopted unanimously on 10 October, at the Council's 7,042nd meeting, by a vote of 15 in favour, 0 against, and 0 abstentions.

== Background ==
Following negotiations brokered by the Economic Community of Central African States (ECCAS), the government of the Central African Republic and the Séléka rebel coalition signed the Libreville Agreements on 11 January 2013, intended to end an armed rebellion through a power-sharing transition.

On 24 March 2013, Séléka forces seized power in Bangui, and the UN Secretary-General called for a swift restoration of constitutional order.

== Provisions ==
The resolution expressed the Council's support for the Libreville Agreements, the N'Djamena Declaration, and the N'Djamena Summit Road Map as the basis for a peaceful resolution of the crisis, and demanded swift implementation of transitional arrangements so that elections could be held within 18 months of the start of the transition.

The Council placed primary responsibility on the CAR's transitional authorities for protecting the population and preserving territorial unity, condemned the 24 March takeover and associated violence and looting, and demanded that Séléka and other armed groups disarm immediately.

The resolution strengthened the mandate of the UN Integrated Peacebuilding Office in the CAR (BINUCA), and directed the Council to consider options for supporting the African Union-led International Support Mission in the CAR (MISCA), including a UN logistics package or eventual conversion into a UN peacekeeping operation.

== Aftermath ==
In response to the resolution, the Secretary-General dispatched an interagency Technical Assessment Mission to the CAR from 27 October to 8 November 2013, led by Assistant Secretary-General for Peacekeeping Operations Edmond Mulet.

Pursuant to paragraph 22 of the resolution, the Secretary-General's follow-up report on the CAR was issued as document S/2013/677, on 15 November 2013.

Resolution 2121 was followed two months later by Resolution 2127 (5 December 2013), which authorized the deployment of MISCA and a French military force with a stronger mandate to protect civilians in the CAR.

== See also ==
- List of United Nations Security Council Resolutions 2101 to 2200 (2013–2015)
