= United Nations Security Council Resolution 2114 =

UN Security Council Resolution 2114
- Flag of Cyprus
- Date: 30 July 2013
- Meeting no.: 7014
- Code: S/RES/2114 (Document)
- Subject: Cyprus
- Voting summary: 13 voted for; None voted against; 2 abstained
- Result: Adopted

Security Council composition
- Permanent members: China; France; Russia; United Kingdom; United States
- Non-permanent members: Argentina; Australia; Azerbaijan; Guatemala; South Korea; Luxembourg; Morocco; Pakistan; Rwanda; Togo

United Nations Security Council resolution 2114, adopted on 30 July 2013, after recalling all relevant resolutions on Cyprus, the Council discussed expanding the UN peacekeeping mission in Cyprus as part of a wider process to settle the Cyprus dispute.

Resolution 2114 was adopted by 13 votes to none, with 2 abstentions from Azerbaijan and Pakistan.

== See also ==
- Cyprus dispute
- List of United Nations Security Council Resolutions 2101 to 2200 (2013–2015)
- United Nations Buffer Zone in Cyprus
- Turkish Invasion of Cyprus
