= Mbaye Diagne =

Senegalese Army officer (1958–1994)

- Born: 18 March 1958; Koki, Senegal
- Died: 31 May 1994 (aged 36); Kigali, Rwanda
- Military career
- Allegiance: Senegal
- Branch: Senegalese Army
- Service years: 1983–1994
- Rank: Captain
- Units: 12th Training Battalion; 6th Infantry Battalion
- Conflicts: Casamance conflict Rwandan Genocide †
- Awards: National Order of the Lion, rank of Knight

Mbaye Diagne (18 March 1958 – 31 May 1994) was a Senegalese military officer who served in Rwanda as a United Nations military observer from 1993 to 1994. During the Rwandan genocide, he undertook many missions on his own initiative to save the lives of civilians.

Diagne was born in Senegal. After graduating from the University of Dakar, he enrolled in the Senegalese Army's École Nationale des Officiers d'Active. He completed his schooling the following year and eventually attained the rank of captain. He was given command of the 3rd Company of the 6th Infantry Battalion and fought in the Casamance conflict from 1989 to 1993.

That year, Diagne was sent to Rwanda as part of an Organisation of African Unity military observer team tasked with monitoring the Rwandan Civil War, a conflict fought between the Hutu-dominated government and the Tutsi-led Rwanda Patriotic Front (RPF). Later, he was assigned to the United Nations Assistance Mission for Rwanda (UNAMIR), a UN peacekeeping force meant to oversee the implementation of the Arusha Accords—a peace agreement designed to end the war. In April 1994, the President of Rwanda was killed. Hutu extremists initiated the Rwandan genocide, targeting members of the Tutsi ethnic minority. They murdered moderate Hutu Prime Minister Agathe Uwilingiyimana, and Diagne rescued her children and secured them safe passage out of the country. He then undertook numerous missions on his own around Kigali in violation of the UN's rules of engagement, hiding Tutsis in his car and evacuating them to UN installations. He also protected some Hutus and worked to safeguard the Senegalese expatriate community. Various estimates exist for the number of lives Diagne saved, ranging as high as over 1,000.

On 31 May 1994, Diagne was killed when a mortar shell launched by RPF forces exploded near his car while he was stopped at a government checkpoint. His death led the UN to suspend relief operations in Kigali. His body was repatriated to Senegal and buried with full military honours. In 2005, Diagne was posthumously awarded the rank of Knight in Senegal's National Order of the Lion. The UN Security Council created the Captain Mbaye Diagne Medal for Exceptional Courage in 2014 in his honour.

== Early life ==
Mbaye Diagne was born on 18 March 1958 in Koki, Louga region, Senegal. His first language was Wolof, but he learned to speak others, including English and French. He grew up in Pikine, a suburb of Dakar. Diagne was one of nine children, and the first person in his family to attend university, studying at the University of Dakar. He married Yacine Mar Diop and had a son, Cheikh, and a daughter, Coumba, with her.

== Military career ==
=== Senegalese service ===
In January 1983, Diagne enrolled in the École Nationale des Officiers d'Active (National School for Active Officers). He graduated in July 1984 and was made head of section of the 12th Training Battalion of the Senegalese Army. In 1985, he was made promotion encadreur (organiser) at the Ecole Nationale des Sous-Officiers d'Active (National School of Active Non-Commissioned Officers). He eventually attained the rank of captain. In 1989, Diagne was given command of the 3rd Company of the Confederal Battalion, later the 6th Infantry Battalion, in Bignona. From there, he fought in the Casamance conflict until 1993.

=== Service in Rwanda ===
In 1993, Diagne was sent to Rwanda as a military observer attached to an Organisation of African Unity team meant to monitor the Rwandan Civil War, a conflict fought between the Hutu-dominated government of Rwanda and the Tutsi-led Rwanda Patriotic Front (RPF). Later that year, the United Nations created Assistance Mission for Rwanda (UNAMIR), a UN peacekeeping force meant to oversee the implementation of the Arusha Accords—a peace agreement designed to end the war. Diagne was then reassigned to UNAMIR and served officially as a military liaison officer between UNAMIR and the Rwandan government. On 6 April 1994, the plane carrying the President of Rwanda, Juvénal Habyarimana, was shot down. Soon thereafter the civil war resumed while Hutu extremists moved to seize power and began the Rwandan genocide, targeting members of the Tutsi ethnic minority. The Interahamwe, a Hutu extremist militia, erected roadblocks across the Rwandan capital, Kigali, to screen for Tutsis. The following morning Prime Minister Agathe Uwilingiyimana, a moderate Hutu who preferred to negotiate a power-sharing agreement with the Tutsis, was assassinated by soldiers of the Presidential Guard at her home in Kigali. The ten Belgian peacekeepers assigned to her protection were also murdered. Diagne heard rumours of Uwilingiyimana's murder from people fleeing to Hôtel des Mille Collines, which was occupied by UN peacekeepers. He came to investigate and found the prime minister's four children being hidden in the adjoining United Nations Development Programme housing compound. Later that morning UNAMIR Force Commander General Roméo Dallaire—also investigating Uwilingiyimana's whereabouts—drove down to the compound and encountered Diagne behind the gates. The captain informed him of the prime minister's murder and expressed concern that the Presidential Guard would return and kill the children. Before departing, Dallaire assured Diagne that UNAMIR armoured personnel carriers would arrive later that day to rescue the children and UNDP employees. Diagne chose to wait with the children, but the armoured vehicles never appeared. Diagne then put the children in the back seat of his own vehicle, covered them with clothes, and brought them to the hotel. From there he smuggled the children past numerous Interahamwe checkpoints and brought them to Kigali International Airport where he secured them safe passage on a Canadian plane to Kenya.

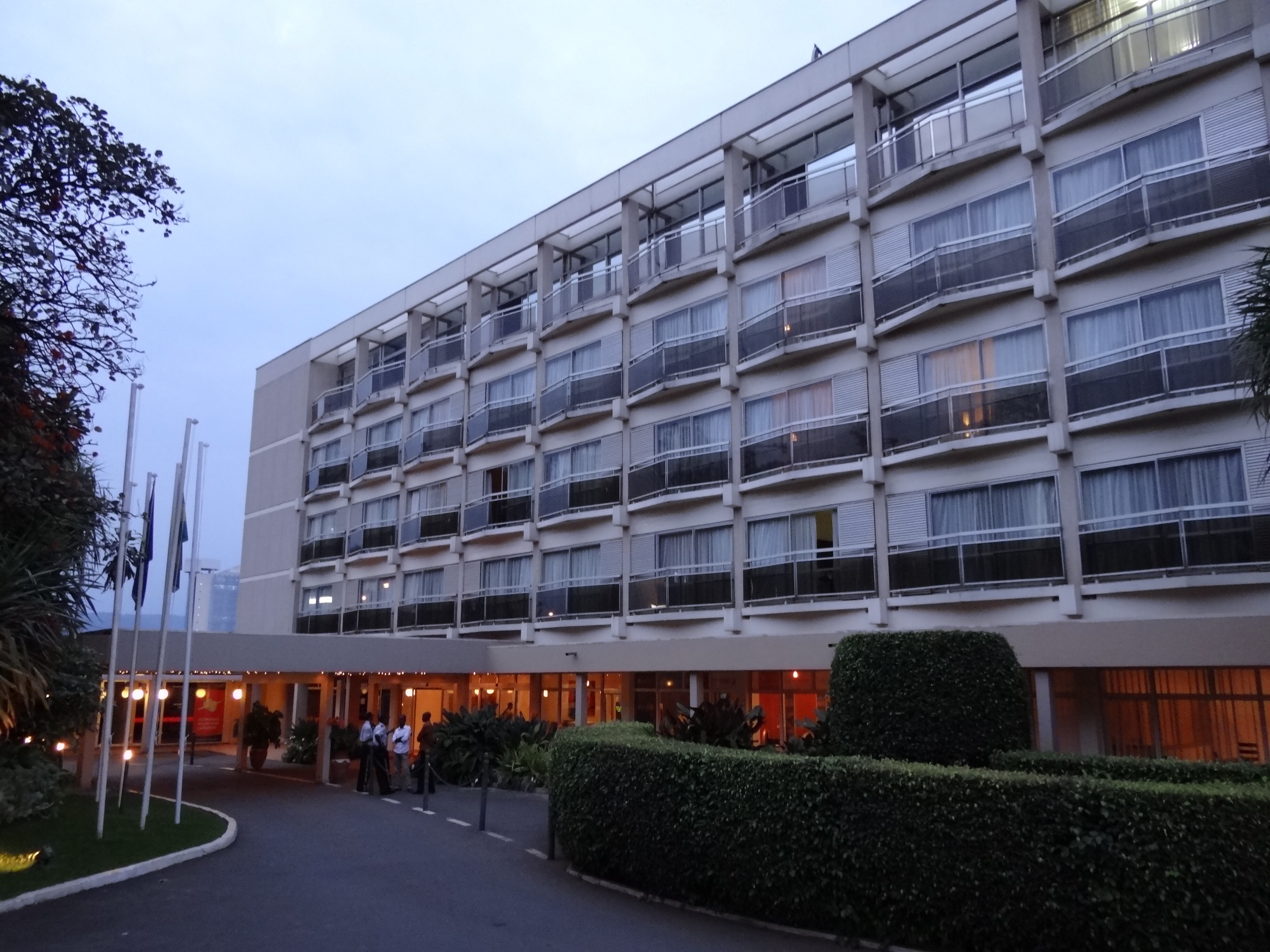
Mbaye brought many of the people he rescued during the genocide to the Hôtel des Mille Collines (pictured) for safety.

Despite UN rules prohibiting personnel from intervening in the conflict, it soon became apparent to other UNAMIR personnel that Diagne was ignoring orders and carrying out rescue missions. He would go out alone in his vehicle to rescue Tutsis and bring them to safety before they could be hunted down and killed. He also recovered some Hutus. Because he had to pass through dozens of checkpoints manned by Interahamwe tasked with killing Tutsis and moderate Hutus, Diagne ferried at most five people on each trip, often taking them to the Hôtel des Mille Collines or Amahoro Stadium, both under UN guard, for safety. In order to get past the checkpoints, he relied on his extensive contacts among the military and militias, his ability to defuse tense situations with quick jokes, and occasional bribes of cigarettes, money and—though he was a devout Muslim—alcohol. He paid off militiamen to facilitate the escape of Rwandan employees of UN aid projects. He once spent a full day ferrying 25 Tutsis in his car from a house in Nyamirambo next to a government military base past checkpoints to a safer location. He also acted to protect the Senegalese expatriate community in the country. In one instance, he stood between an armed Hutu priest and a woman the priest was about to execute, shouting "Why are you killing this woman? You must not do this because if you do the whole world will know," and eventually convincing the priest to let her live.

Dallaire was aware of Diagne's actions but did not attempt to stop him. Gregory Alex, the head of the UN Humanitarian Assistance Team in Rwanda gave an explanation as to why Diagne was not rebuked: "Here's someone who stepped out of line and [the general is] not going to discipline him because he's doing the right thing." BBC journalist Mark Doyle befriended Diagne and knew of his actions, but omitted mention of him in his news dispatches because he feared that the Rwandan government would learn of his rescues and try to stop him. In one instance, Doyle was riding in Diagne's car when the two were stopped by a Hutu militia. The militiamen questioned whether Doyle was Belgian, since they were suspicious of Belgians. Diagne defused the situation by joking that he was a "black Belgian" before commanding the militia to let them pass.

A UN peacekeeper filmed by Diagne a few days before the latter died.

UNAMIR eventually managed to negotiate an agreement with the Rwandan government, whereby they would facilitate the transfer of endangered Hutus behind rebel lines to the government in exchange for being allowed to evacuate endangered Tutsis from government territory to the rebel-held areas. During the first such transfer, a UN convoy laden with Tutsis leaving the Hôtel des Mille Collines was attacked by a militia armed with machetes. Unarmed, Diagne stood atop one of the lorries, striking militiamen with his gear bag and kicking them to protect the civilians. The convoy later returned to the hotel. Diagne also captured amateur video footage of the UN peacekeepers in Rwanda during the genocide, which became one of the few video records of the event.

Various estimates exist for the number of lives Daigne saved. Dallaire credited him with protecting "dozens upon dozens", while Alex stated that he saved "at least hundreds". Babacar Faye, a Senegalese soldier who served in UNAMIR, asserted that Diagne saved at least 400 or 500 people. The United States Department of State estimated that he protected as many as 600 people. Academic Richard Siegler posited that he may have saved 1,000 or more lives.

== Death ==
On 31 May, just 12 days before he was scheduled to go back to Senegal, Diagne drove alone back to UNAMIR Force Headquarters in Kigali with a message for Dallaire from Rwandan Armed Forces Chief of Staff Augustin Bizimungu. While Mbaye was stopped at a Rwandan Armed Forces checkpoint at a bridge along the Boulevard du MRND, RPF forces fired a mortar at the position. Shrapnel entered through the rear window of Diagne's jeep and hit him in the back of the head, killing him instantly. Alex realised that the UN did not have a body bag for Diagne and was forced to make one from a light blue UNICEF tarp and tape:

We're calling around for a body bag, and there's no body bags, there's nothing, and you wonder .... and as we were starting to put this together, we were saying here's a guy who gave his ultimate—who did everything—and we don't even have a body bag; nothing to, you know, show him some respect. We had some UNICEF plastic sheeting and we had some tape. We're folding them up, and the creases aren't right, because his feet are so damn big. And you don't want that for him; you want it to be like, you know, just laid out perfectly. So that when people look at him, they know that he was something great.

Personnel at the UNAMIR Force Headquarters held a minute of silence in Diagne's honour and hosted a small parade at the airport on 1 June. Diagne was the 12th UNAMIR peacekeeper to die in the conflict, and his death led the UN to suspend relief operations in Kigali. After five days, Diagne's body was repatriated to Senegal. He was buried there with full military honours.

== Honours and commemoration ==
The Captain Mbaye Diagne Medal for Exceptional Courage ribbon bar.

On 1 June 2005, Diagne was posthumously awarded the rank of Knight in Senegal's National Order of the Lion. On 4 July 2010, President of Rwanda Paul Kagame accorded Diagne with the Umurinzi honour—Rwanda's Campaign Against Genocide Medal. The following year the United States Department of State accorded him a Tribute To Persons Of Courage certificate. His actions during the genocide were featured in a 2004 Frontline documentary about the event, Ghosts of Rwanda. On 8 May 2014, the UN Security Council created the Captain Mbaye Diagne Medal for Exceptional Courage in honour of the actions of Diagne during the Rwandan Genocide. His family was given the award in May 2016. An Italian veteran of UNAMIR created an association to "promote Diagne’s memory and support his family’s development." On 31 May 2019, the Senegalese Army renamed its training centre in Thiès after Diagne.
