= United Nations Security Council Resolution 2111 =

UN Security Council Resolution 2111
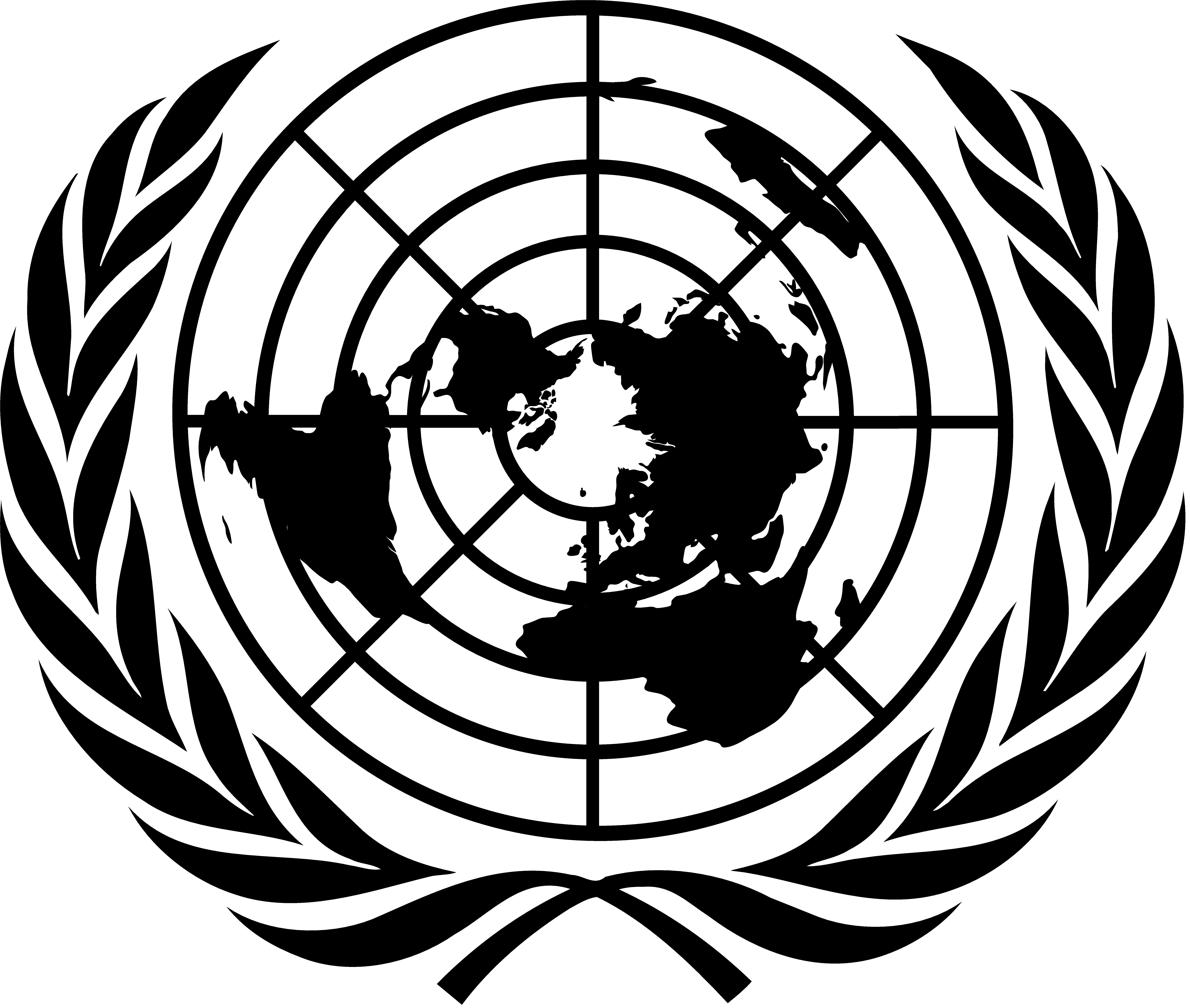
- UN emblem
- Date: 24 July 2013
- Meeting no.: 7009
- Code: S/RES/2111 (Document)
- Subject: Somalia
- Voting summary: 15 voted for; None voted against; None abstained
- Result: Adopted

Security Council composition
- Permanent members: China; France; Russia; United Kingdom; United States
- Non-permanent members: Argentina; Australia; Azerbaijan; Guatemala; South Korea; Luxembourg; Morocco; Pakistan; Rwanda; Togo

United Nations Security Council resolution 2111 was adopted in 2013.

The resolution mandates the group monitoring sanctions imposed on Somalia, explicitly targeting parties that obstructed justice while further easing funding and equipment restrictions on the United Nations and European Union missions in that country.

== See also ==
- List of United Nations Security Council Resolutions 2101 to 2200 (2013–2015)
