= United Nations Security Council Resolution 2182 =

UN Security Council Resolution 2182
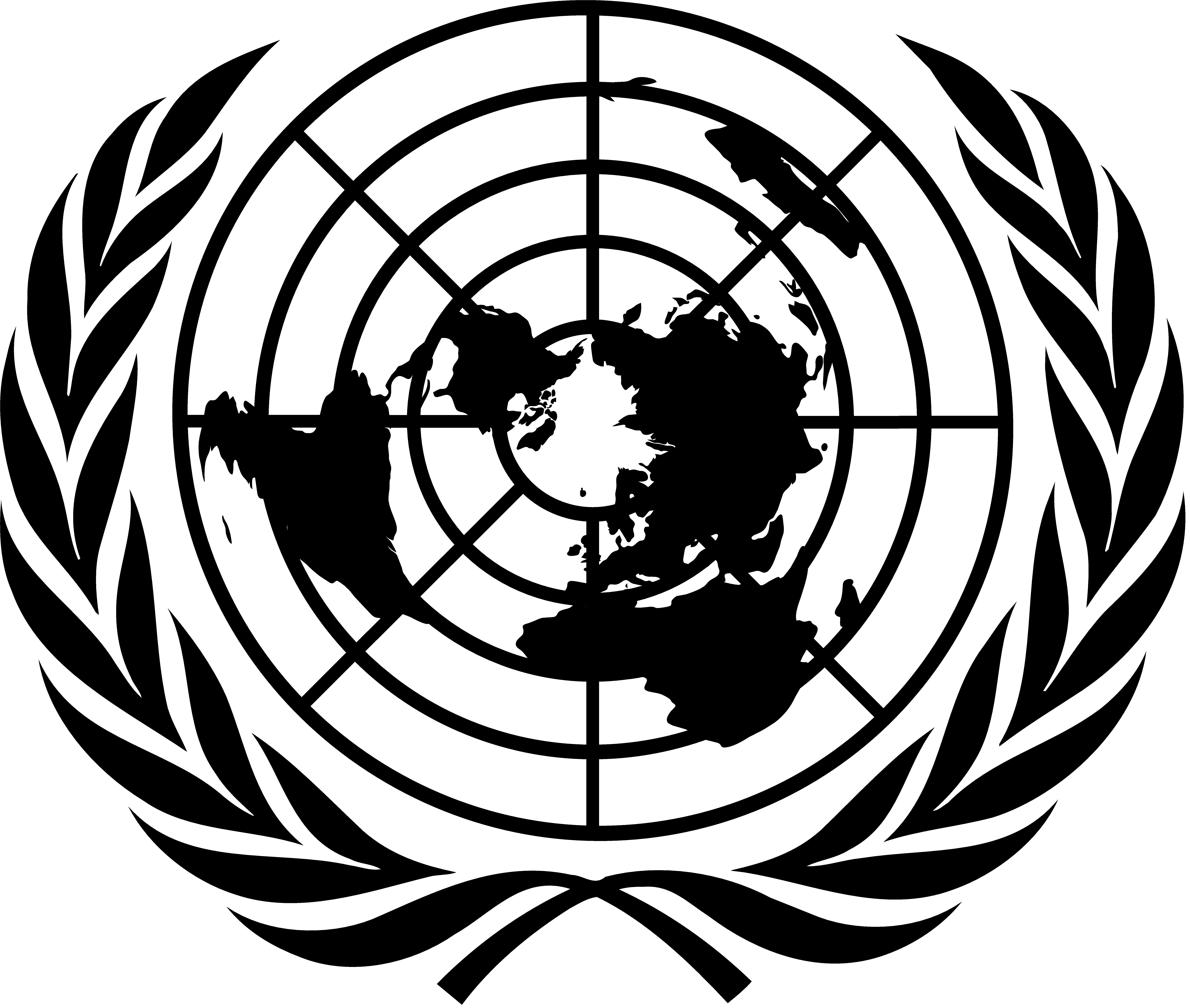
- UN emblem
- Date: 24 October 2014
- Meeting no.: 7286
- Code: S/RES/2182 (Document)
- Subject: The situation in Somalia and Eritrea
- Voting summary: 13 voted for; None voted against; 2 abstained
- Result: Adopted

Security Council composition
- Permanent members: China; France; Russia; United Kingdom; United States
- Non-permanent members: Argentina; Australia; Chad; Chile; Jordan; South Korea; Lithuania; Luxembourg; Nigeria; Rwanda

United Nations Security Council Resolution 2182 was adopted on 24 October 2014. The resolution had 13 votes support and none against, with Jordan and Russia abstaining.

== See also ==
- List of United Nations Security Council Resolutions 2101 to 2200
