= United Nations Assistance Mission in Somalia =

United Nations mission in Somalia

UNSOM
- United Nations Assistance Mission in Somalia (Note: French: Mission d'assistance des Nations Unies en Somalie (MANUSOM); Spanish: Misión de Asistencia de las Naciones Unidas en Somalia (UNSOM); Russian: Миссия Организации Объединенных Наций по содействию Сомали (МООНСОМ); Chinese: 联合国索马里援助团 (联索援助团); Arabic: بعثة الأمم المتحدة لتقديم المساعدة إلى الصومال.)
- Hawlgalka Kaalmaynta Qaramada Midoobay ee Soomaaliya (UNSOM)
- Predecessor: United Nations Political Office for Somalia (UNPOS)
- Successor: United Nations Transitional Mission in Somalia
- Formation: 3 June 2013; 13 years ago
- Dissolved: 1 November 2024
- Type: Special political mission
- Legal status: Disbanded
- Headquarters: Mogadishu, Somalia
- Head of Mission: James Swan
- Parent organization: Department of Political and Peacebuilding Affairs
- Staff: 362
- Website: unsom.unmissions.org

The United Nations Assistance Mission in Somalia (UNSOM) was a special political mission of the United Nations Department of Political and Peacebuilding Affairs. Its primary purpose was to assist the Federal Government of Somalia in achieving peace, stability and reconciliation. It worked closely with and supported the work of the African Union Mission in Somalia (AMISOM) and the African Union Transition Mission in Somalia.

UNSOM replaced the United Nations Political Office for Somalia (UNPOS), which was in existence from 15 April 1995 until the expiration of its Security Council mandate on 2 June 2013.

On 30 October 2024, the United Nations Security Council voted 15–0 to dissolve the United Nations Assistance Mission in Somalia and formed a new mission called the United Nations Transitional Mission in Somalia, which began operations on 1 November 2024.

On 31 October 2024, the United Nations Assistance Mission in Somalia (UNSOM) concluded its operations after United Nations Security Council resolution 2753 established the United Nations Transitional Assistance Mission in Somalia (UNTMIS) as its successor. The transition responds to a request from Somalia's Federal Government for a two-year handover period. By October 2026, the mission's functions are expected to fully transfer to support Somalia's development goals.

The Mission had its headquarters in Mogadishu and also had offices in Kismaayo (in the state of Jubaland), Hargeisa (in the self-declared Republic of Somaliland), Garowe (Puntland), Baidoa (South West) and Belet Weyne (Hirshabelle).

== Mandate ==
UNSOM was created by means of United Nations Security Council resolution 2102, adopted unanimously on 3 June 2013. Under that resolution, it was charged with:

- Providing good offices in support of Somalia's peace and reconciliation process
- Providing the Somali government and AMISOM with strategic policy advice on peacebuilding and statebuilding.
- Assisting the government in coordinating international donor support.
- Building the capacity of the government to promote human rights, women's empowerment and child protection, to prevent conflict-related sexual and gender-based violence, to strengthen its institutions of justice, and to help ensure accountability for crimes.
- Monitoring and helping to investigate and prevent human rights abuses or violations of international humanitarian law, including those committed against children and women.

Originally established for an initial period of twelve months, the Mission's mandate was renewed by successive Security Council resolutions until 31 October 2024.

== Structure ==
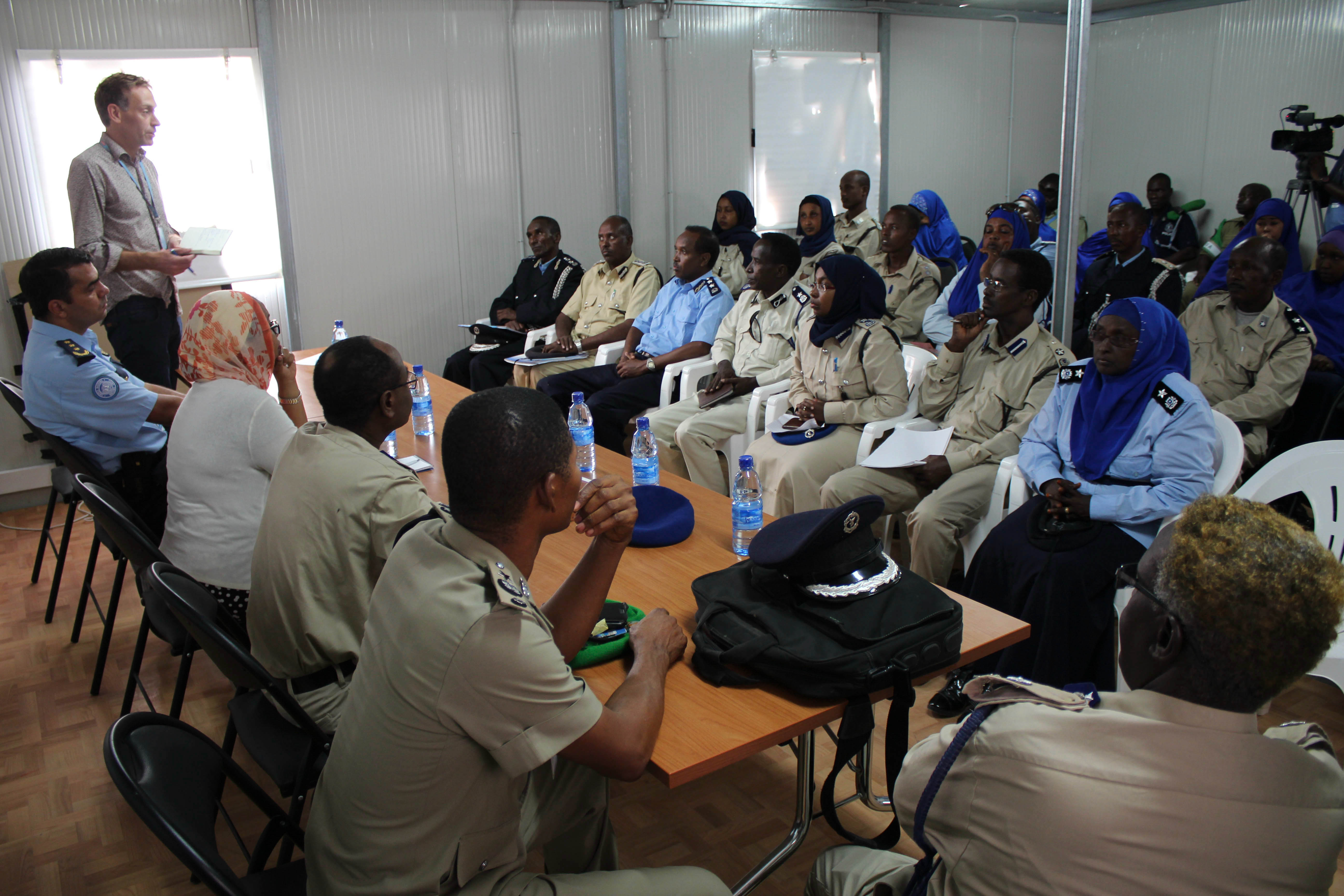
A training session on human rights for police officers organized by UNDP, Human Rights Watch, UNSOM and AMISOM, held in Mogadishu in June 2014.

The Mission comprises the following groups and sections:

- Political Affairs and Mediation Group (PMAG)
- Integrated Electoral Support Group (IESG)
- Rule of Law and Security Institutions Group (ROLSIG)
  - Police Section
  - Disarmament, Demobilisation and Reintegration Section (DDR)
  - Defence Sector Reform Section (DSR)
  - Joint Justice and Corrections Service (JJCS)
  - Integrated Security Sector Reform Section (I-SSR)
  - United Nations Mine Action Service (UNMAS)
- Human Rights and Protection Group (HRPG)
- Gender Office
- Preventing and Countering Violent Extremism (PCVE)
- Strategic Communications and Public Affairs Group (SCPAG)
- Donor Coordination
- Community Recovery and Extension of State Authority and Accountability Team (CRESTA/A)
- Climate Security Team
- Inter-Agency Youth Working Group

== Heads of Mission ==
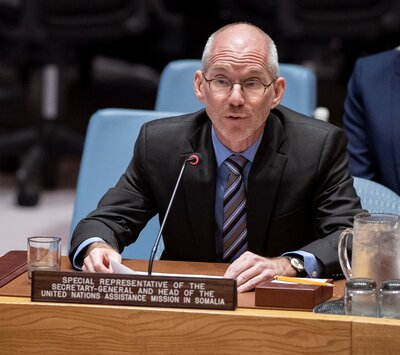
James Swan, acting Special Representative assumed since 14 May 2024

The Mission was led by the Special Representative of the Secretary-General for Somalia and Head of the United Nations Assistance Mission in Somalia. The Head of Mission was assisted by two Deputy Special Representatives.

Head of Mission	Nationality	Appointed
James Swan	United States	14 May 2024
Catriona Laing	United Kingdom	3 May 2023
James Swan	United States	30 May 2019
Nicholas Haysom	South Africa	12 September 2018
Michael Keating	United Kingdom	23 November 2015
Nicholas Kay	United Kingdom	29 April 2013

== Contributing countries ==
As of 30 November 2023, fourteen countries contributed a total of 647 personnel (military and civilian) to the mission:

Country	Personnel
Brazil	2
Finland	1
Germany	1
Ghana	2
India	1
Indonesia	1
Nepal	1
Sierra Leone	1
Sweden	2
Thailand	2
Turkey	1
Uganda	627
United Kingdom	2
Zimbabwe	3

== See also ==
- African Union Mission in Somalia
- United Nations Operation in Somalia I (UNOSOM I)
- United Nations Operation in Somalia II (UNOSOM II)
