= Captain Mbaye Diagne Medal =

UN Security Council Resolution 2154
- An illustration of the medal
- Date: 8 May 2014
- Meeting no.: 7170
- Code: S/RES/2154 (Document)
- Subject: Creation of the Captain Mbaye Diagne Medal for Exceptional Courage
- Voting summary: 15 voted for; None voted against; None abstained
- Result: Adopted

Security Council composition
- Permanent members: China; France; Russia; United Kingdom; United States
- Non-permanent members: Argentina; Australia; Chad; Chile; Jordan; South Korea; Lithuania; Luxembourg; Nigeria; Rwanda

Ribbon

The Captain Mbaye Diagne Medal for Exceptional Courage is, along with the Dag Hammarskjöld Medal and the United Nations Medal, one of three awards of the United Nations. It is awarded to "military, police, civilian United Nations personnel and associated personnel who demonstrate exceptional courage, in the face of extreme danger, while fulfilling the mandate of their missions or their functions, in the service of humanity and the United Nations". It was created on 8 May 2014 by the United Nations Security Council in its Resolution 2154 (Note: The Security Council unanimously adopted Resolution 2154 on 8 May 2014 at its 7170th meeting.) and is named for Mbaye Diagne, a Senegalese Captain and Military Observer serving with the United Nations Assistance Mission for Rwanda (UNAMIR), who was killed in action in Kigali on 31 May 1994.

The first medal was awarded posthumously to Diagne and was received by his widow and two children in the UN General Assembly Hall on 19 May 2016. In 2019, it was awarded to Private Chancy Chitete, from the Malawian contingent of the United Nations Organization Stabilization Mission in the Democratic Republic of the Congo (MONUSCO), who was killed during fighting against the Allied Democratic Forces. On 26 May 2022, the Captain Mbaye Diagne Medal was awarded posthumously to Captain Abdelrazakh Hamit Bahar of Chad for his bravery during his deployment with the United Nations Multidimensional Integrated Stabilization Mission in Mali (MINUSMA).

In 2026, Uruguayan Sergeant Matías Reyes Peñaloza became the fourth recipient of the Captain Mbaye Diagne Medal. The medal was awarded by the United Nations Secretary-General, António Guterres, in an official ceremony, in recognition of Reyes's service and commitment to peace, both on mission with Stabilization Mission in the Democratic Republic of the Congo (MONUSCO) and in the performance of his duty.

== Award requirements and design ==
The medal is awarded, irrespective of the United Nations Medal, to persons who, while participating in a UN mission in an extremely dangerous situation, have shown extraordinary courage.

On the front side of the gold-coloured medal is the emblem of the United Nations with the text United Nations, Exceptional Courage, on the back the text Captain Mbaye Diagne Medal, in the Service of Peace. The ribbon is light blue-gold striped.

== Medal ==
- 2016: Mbaye Diagne, Senegal
- 2019: Chancy Chitete, Malawi
- 2022: Abdelrazakh Hamit Bahar, Chad
- 2026: Matías Reyes Peñaloza, Uruguay
