= United Nations Security Council Resolution 2167 =

UN Security Council Resolution 2167
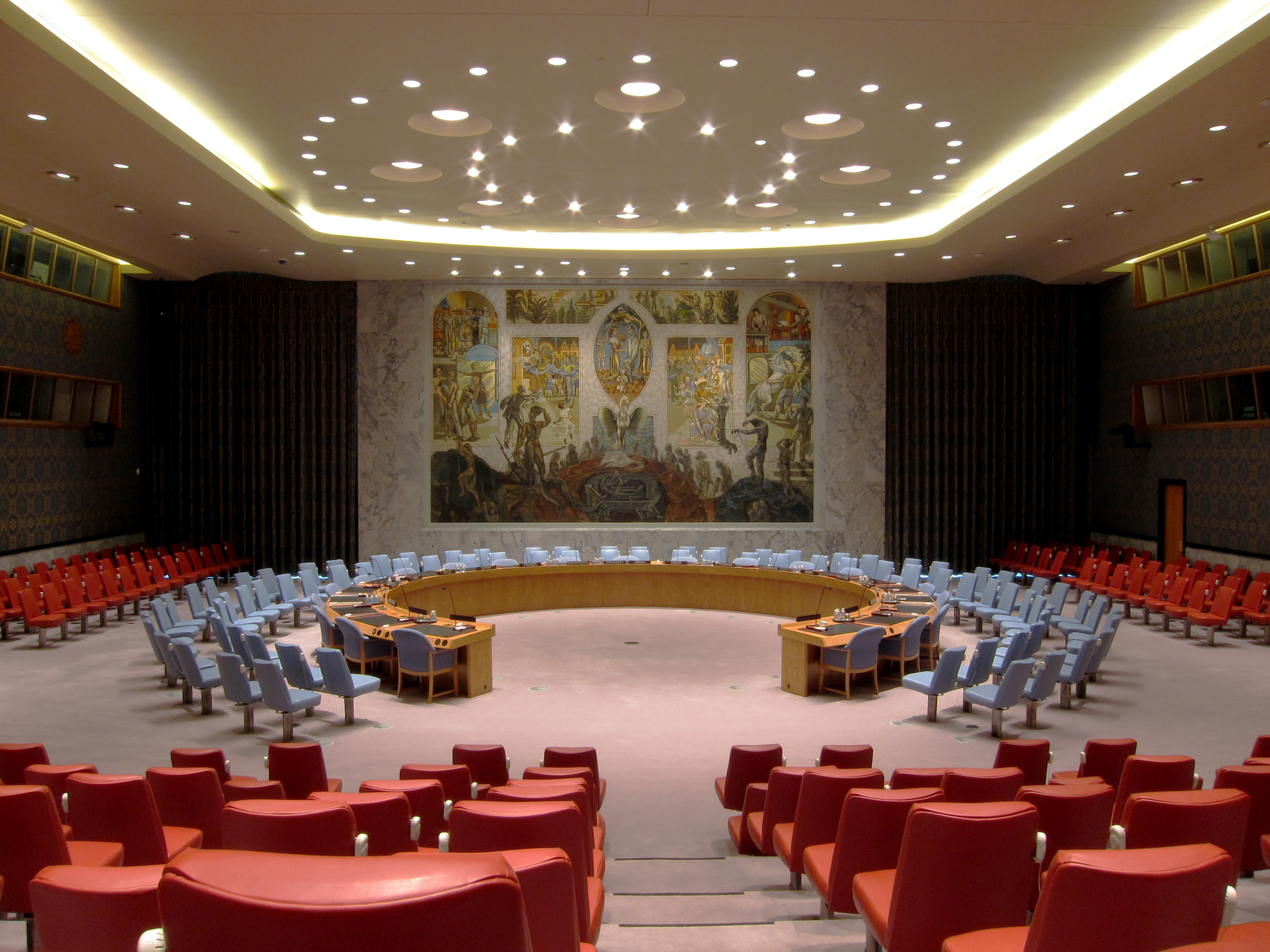
- UN Security Council Chamber in New York City
- Date: 28 July 2014
- Meeting no.: 7,228
- Code: S/RES/2167 (Document)
- Subject: On enhancing the relationship between the United Nations and regional/subregional organizations, in particular the African Union
- Voting summary: 15 voted for; None voted against; None abstained
- Result: Adopted

Security Council composition
- Permanent members: China; France; Russia; United Kingdom; United States
- Non-permanent members: Argentina; Australia; Chad; Chile; Jordan; South Korea; Lithuania; Luxembourg; Nigeria; Rwanda

United Nations Security Council Resolution 2167, concerning the critical role of regional cooperation in International Peacekeeping and Security was adopted unanimously on 28 July 2014. The resolution originated through a debate initiated by the Permanent Representative of Rwanda by sending a letter dated 3 July addressed to the Secretary-General. The 15 member body emphasised that concrete steps should be taken by United Nations and regional organisations (especially the African Union) to strengthen their relationships and develop more effective partnership. The resolution reaffirms support for African Union and European Union collaboration with peacekeeping operations.

== Observations ==
Acting under Chapter VIII of the UN Charter, the Security Council (SC) reaffirmed its previous resolutions 1809(2008), 2033(2012) and 2086 (2013). It reiterated the need for cooperation between UN and regional organizations due to various reasons, such as-

- Pertinent role of such organizations in post-conflict peace-building in a region;
- Ability of regional organizations to understand the root causes of armed conflicts owing to their knowledge of the region, which can be a benefit for their efforts to influence the prevention or resolution of such conflicts.

== Acts ==
The Security Council stressed upon the utility of developing effective partnerships with regional/sub-regional organizations. This partnership is important as local entities can respond to disputes and emerging crises much quicker than the UN, thereby preventing or at least mitigating the potentially negative consequences.

The SC also asked regional organizations to accelerate the work on establishment of 'Standby Arrangements System' for conflict prevention and peace keeping. The Council also called upon the Secretary-General to coordinate with and support the African Union Commission in its development of a list of needed capacities and recommendations on ways the African Union can further develop its military, police, technical, logistic and administrative capabilities.
