= United Nations Security Council Resolution 1910 =

UN Security Council Resolution 1910
- Somalia
- Date: 28 January 2010
- Meeting no.: 6,266
- Code: S/RES/1910 (Document)
- Subject: The situation in Somalia
- Voting summary: 15 voted for; None voted against; None abstained
- Result: Adopted

Security Council composition
- Permanent members: China; France; Russia; United Kingdom; United States
- Non-permanent members: Austria; Bosnia–Herzegovina; Brazil; Gabon; Japan; Lebanon; Mexico; Nigeria; Turkey; Uganda

United Nations Security Council Resolution 1910, adopted unanimously on January 28, 2010, after hearing recommendations from the Secretary-General and recalling resolutions 1325 (2000), 1612 (2005), 1674 (2006), 1738 (2006), 1820 (2008), 1863 (2009), 1882 (2009), 1888 (2009) and 1894 (2009), the Council authorised the mandate of the African Union Mission to Somalia (AMISOM) to be extended until January 31, 2011, asking it to increase its strength to carry out its mandate.

The Council, acting under Chapter VII of the United Nations Charter, asked AMISOM to assist the Transitional Federal Government to develop police and security forces, ensuring that all equipment and services were used transparently and effectively. It also requested the Secretary-General assist in this process, but not to transfer funds until January 31, 2011.

The resolution also called for Member States to contribute to the United Nations Trust Fund for AMISOM.

== See also ==
- List of United Nations Security Council Resolutions 1901 to 2000 (2009–2011)
- Somali Civil War
- Somali Civil War (2009–present)
