= Democratic Republic of the Congo–Mexico relations =

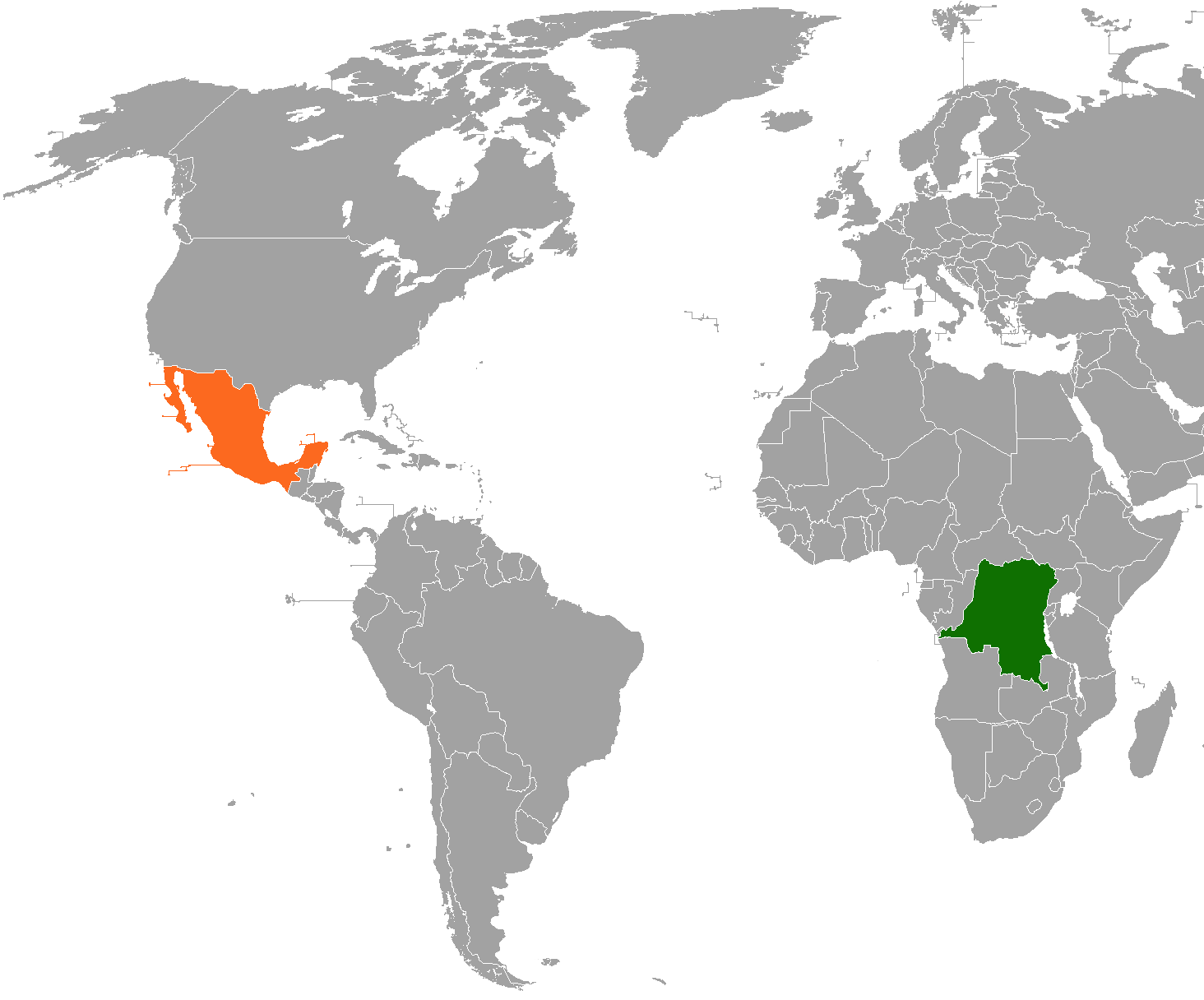

- DR Congo: Mexico

The nations of the Democratic Republic of the Congo and Mexico established diplomatic relations in 1975. Both nations are members of the Group of 24 and the United Nations.

== History ==
During the Atlantic slave trade, Spain transported many African slaves from the Congo to Mexico where they arrived primarily to the port city of Veracruz. In June 1960, Mexico recognized the independence of Congo-Kinshasa from Belgium. In January 1961, Mexican Foreign Secretary Manuel Tello Baurraud, expressed his regret at the death of former Congolese Prime Minister Patrice Lumumba.

The DR Congo (at the time known as Zaire) and Mexico formally established diplomatic relations on 31 July 1975. Since the establishment of diplomatic relations, relations between both nations have primarily taken place at international forums such as at the United Nations.

Mexico, as a non-permanent member of the United Nations Security Council from 1980 to 1981 and again from 2002 to 2003; voted for resolutions addressing the situation in the DR Congo. Some of these resolutions were the following: UN Resolution 1399, 1417, 1445, 1457, 1896, 1906, 1925 and 1952 (to name a few). In 2007, Mexico accredited for the first time its ambassador resident in Addis Ababa, Ethiopia to the government of the DR Congo.

In December 2010, Congolese Minister of the Environment, Tosi Mpanu Mpanu, attended the 2010 United Nations Climate Change Conference held in Cancún, Mexico. In April 2014, Congolese Minister for Planning, Celestin Vunabandi Kanyamihigo, paid a visit to Mexico. In May 2014, Congolese Vice Minister for Cooperation Dismas Magbengu Swana Emin also paid a visit to Mexico to attend a conference. In November 2014, Mexican Ambassador to Ethiopia, Alfredo Miranda Ortiz, attended the “Africa Regional Meeting” being held in the Congolese capital of Kinshasa.

In early 2019, several hundred Congolese migrants entered Mexico en route to the United States. Many of the Congolese migrants are asylum seekers fleeing political violence in their country of origin and from the Ebola virus. Many of the migrants were also coming from Angola which expelled more than 300,000 Congolese refugees from the country in 2018. As a result of strict immigration laws in the United States, many of the Congolese migrants have asked for asylum in Mexico not wanting to return to the DR Congo. In 2023, 540 Congolese nationals were registered and residing in Mexico.

== High-level visits ==
High-level visits from the DR Congo to Mexico

- Minister of the Environment Tosi Mpanu Mpanu (2010)
- Minister for Planning Celestin Vunabandi Kanyamihigo (2014)
- Vice Minister for Cooperation Dismas Magbengu Swana Emin (2014)

== Scholarship ==
The Mexican government offers each year scholarships for nationals of the Democratic Republic of the Congo to study postgraduate studies at Mexican higher education institutions. In addition, Mexico has a community of Congolese, some of whom are prominent professors who are part of the teaching staff of public and private universities in the country.

== Trade ==
In 2023, trade between the DR Congo and Mexico totaled US$8 million. DR Congos's main exports to Mexico include: cases, bags, boxes to store and similar containers; articles of iron or steel, sheets binder mechanisms, electronic integrated circuits, and parts for engines. Mexico's main exports to the DR Congo include: medicines, malt extracts, discs, tapes, and other media for sound recordings; motors and generators, and fish.

== Diplomatic missions ==
- DR Congo is accredited to Mexico from its embassy in Washington, D.C., United States.
- Mexico is accredited to the DR Congo from its embassy in Nairobi, Kenya.

== See also ==
- Foreign relations of the Democratic Republic of the Congo
- Foreign relations of Mexico
