= United Nations Security Council Resolution 1995 =

UN Security Council Resolution 1995
- Date: 6 July 2011
- Meeting no.: 6,573
- Code: S/RES/1995 (Document)
- Subject: International Criminal Tribunal for Rwanda
- Voting summary: 15 voted for; None voted against; None abstained
- Result: Adopted

Security Council composition
- Permanent members: China; France; Russia; United Kingdom; United States
- Non-permanent members: Bosnia–Herzegovina; Brazil; Colombia; Germany; Gabon; India; Lebanon; Nigeria; Portugal; South Africa

United Nations Security Council Resolution 1995, adopted unanimously on July 6, 2011, after recalling resolutions 955 (1995), 1503 (2003) and 1534 (2003) on the International Criminal Tribunal for Rwanda (ICTR), the Council permitted temporary judges at the tribunal to vote or stand as candidates in elections to the presidency of the ICTR.

The resolution was adopted in response to shortages in staffing at the tribunal.

== Resolution ==
=== Observations ===
In the preamble of the resolution, the Security Council recalled Resolution 1966 (2010) which established a residual mechanism and called on the ICTR to complete all its work by December 31, 2014. It further recalled that the branch of the mechanism relating to the ICTR was to begin functioning on July 1, 2012.

Meanwhile, Council members acknowledged that four permanent judges would be redeployed from the Trial to the Appeals Chamber and two others would leave the tribunal, upon the completion of their cases. There was concern at staffing levels at the tribunal.

=== Acts ===
Acting under Chapter VII of the United Nations Charter, the council decided to allow temporary judges at the ICTR to vote and stand as candidates in elections to the presidency of the tribunal. In this regard, temporary judges elected to the presidency would have the same powers as permanent judges, and, if elected as vice president, could act as president when required to do so. This would not affect the temporary status of the judge.

The resolution gave Judge Dennis Byron special permission to work part-time while engaging in another judicial occupation from September 1, 2011 until the end of his current case. The Council noted the intention of the tribunal to complete the case by December 2011, and urged the President of the ICTR to ensure that Judge Byron remained impartial and that there was no conflict of interest or delay in the case.

Resolution 1995 reaffirmed the importance of the trial of all persons indicted by the ICTR, calling on all states, particularly those in the African Great Lakes region, to co-operate with the tribunal. In particular, the arrest of Félicien Kabuga, Augustin Bizimana, Protais Mpiranya and other indictees was called for.

Meanwhile, Council members stressed the necessity of the tribunal being adequately staffed in order to carry out its work. Finally, the Council praised states that had concluded agreements with the enforcement of sentences of persons convicted by the ICTR to serve their sentences in their territories, and urged countries that had not concluded agreements to do so.

== See also ==
- List of United Nations Security Council Resolutions 1901 to 2000 (2009 – 2011)
- Rwandan genocide
