= United Nations Security Council Resolution 1983 =

UN Security Council Resolution 1983
- HIV/AIDS prevalence worldwide
- Date: 7 June 2011
- Meeting no.: 6,547
- Code: S/RES/1983 (Document)
- Subject: The responsibility of the Security Council in the maintenance of international peace and security: HIV/AIDS and international peacekeeping operations
- Voting summary: 15 voted for; None voted against; None abstained
- Result: Adopted

Security Council composition
- Permanent members: China; France; Russia; United Kingdom; United States
- Non-permanent members: Bosnia–Herzegovina; Brazil; Colombia; Germany; Gabon; India; Lebanon; Nigeria; Portugal; South Africa

United Nations Security Council Resolution 1983 was adopted unanimously on June 7, 2011, after recalling meetings on HIV/AIDS in Africa and in the mandates of peacekeeping operations, as well as resolutions 1308 (2000), 1325 (2000), 1820 (2008), 1888 (2009), 1889 (2009), 1894 (2009) and 1960 (2010). The Council encouraged the inclusion of HIV/AIDS prevention, treatment, care and support in its peacekeeping mandates.

The adoption of Resolution 1983 marked the second time HIV/AIDS and the impact on international peace and security had been discussed by the Security Council. The resolution, tabled by Gabon, came ahead of a three-day high-level meeting concerning the international community's response to HIV/AIDS.

== Resolution ==
=== Observations ===
The Security Council was concerned that since the beginning of the HIV epidemic 30 years ago, more than 60 million people had been infected, 25 million had died and 16 million children were orphaned by AIDS. It recognised that the issue required an "exceptional and comprehensive global response" as it posed a threat to all societies. Council members emphasised the role of the General Assembly and Economic and Social Council in addressing HIV/AIDS. The Joint United Nations Programme on HIV/AIDS (UNAIDS) was praised for its response to HIV/AIDS in appropriate forums.

The preamble of the resolution recognised the impact HIV/AIDS had in society, particularly in conflict and post-conflict situations through mass movements of people, sexual violence and limited access to medical care. The Council noted, therefore, that it was important to end conflict-related violence and empowering women to reduce their risk of exposure to HIV. There was also concern at the rise in health-related issues by United Nations personnel. Furthermore, the protection of civilians by United Nations peacekeeping operations could contribute towards fighting HIV/AIDS, and welcomed initiatives by countries to implement HIV treatment, care, prevention and support.

=== Acts ===
Council members emphasised that urgent action was needed to curb the impact of the HIV epidemic in conflict and post-conflict situations, through local, national, regional and international initiatives. The Council noted the "disproportionate burden" of HIV/AIDS on women that continued to affect gender equality and the empowerment of women and urged assistance in this context.

The resolution recognised that United Nations peacekeeping operations were important factors in the response against HIV/AIDS, and welcomed its inclusion in its peacekeeping mandates, stressing support was needed to address the social stigma and discrimination associated with the disease. The Secretary-General was urged to consider a variety of HIV/AIDS-related issues in his activities concerning the prevention and resolution of conflict, and strengthen efforts to implement the zero-tolerance sexual exploitation policy.

The Security Council encouraged the use of HIV prevention, treatment, care and support in its peacekeeping missions, such as through counselling, testing programmes and assistance provided to national institutions; such efforts needed to be intensified, according to the resolution. Finally, co-operation among states was welcomed and encouraged in the role of HIV/AIDS prevention, treatment, care and support.

== See also ==
- Joint United Nations Programme on HIV/AIDS
- List of countries by HIV/AIDS adult prevalence rate
- List of United Nations Security Council Resolutions 1901 to 2000 (2009 – 2011)
- United Nations Special Envoy for HIV/AIDS in Africa
