= United Nations Security Council Resolution 1928 =

UN Security Council Resolution 1928
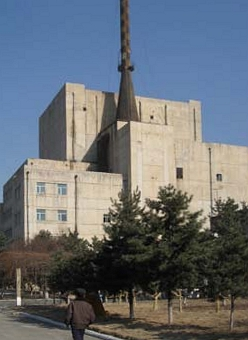
- Reactor at the Yongbyon Nuclear Scientific Research Center in North Korea
- Date: 7 June 2010
- Meeting no.: 6,333
- Code: S/RES/1928 (Document)
- Subject: Non-proliferation; Democratic People's Republic of Korea
- Voting summary: 15 voted for; None voted against; None abstained
- Result: Adopted

Security Council composition
- Permanent members: China; France; Russia; United Kingdom; United States
- Non-permanent members: Austria; Bosnia–Herzegovina; Brazil; Gabon; Japan; Lebanon; Mexico; Nigeria; Turkey; Uganda

United Nations Security Council Resolution 1928, adopted unanimously on June 7, 2010, after recalling resolutions 825 (1993), 1540 (2004), 1695 (2006), 1718 (2006), 1874 (2009) and 1887 (2009) on the topics of North Korea and nuclear weapons, the Council extended the mandate of a panel of experts monitoring sanctions against the country until June 12, 2011.

The Security Council determined that the proliferation and delivery of nuclear, chemical and biological weapons constituted a threat to international peace and security. Acting under Chapter VII of the United Nations Charter, the Council extended the mandate of the expert panel established in Resolution 1874 to monitor the newly strengthened sanctions regime against North Korea, imposed after an underground nuclear test conducted in May 2009. The panel was requested to provide a report by November 12, 2010 and a second report 30 days prior to the termination of its current mandate with its findings and recommendations.

Finally, all states, United Nations agencies and others were urged to co-operate fully with the Committee of the Security Council established in Resolution 1718 and the expert panel.

== See also ==
- 2009 North Korean nuclear test
- List of United Nations Security Council Resolutions 1901 to 2000 (2009–2011)
- North Korea and weapons of mass destruction
