= United Nations Security Council Resolution 1993 =

UN Security Council Resolution 1993
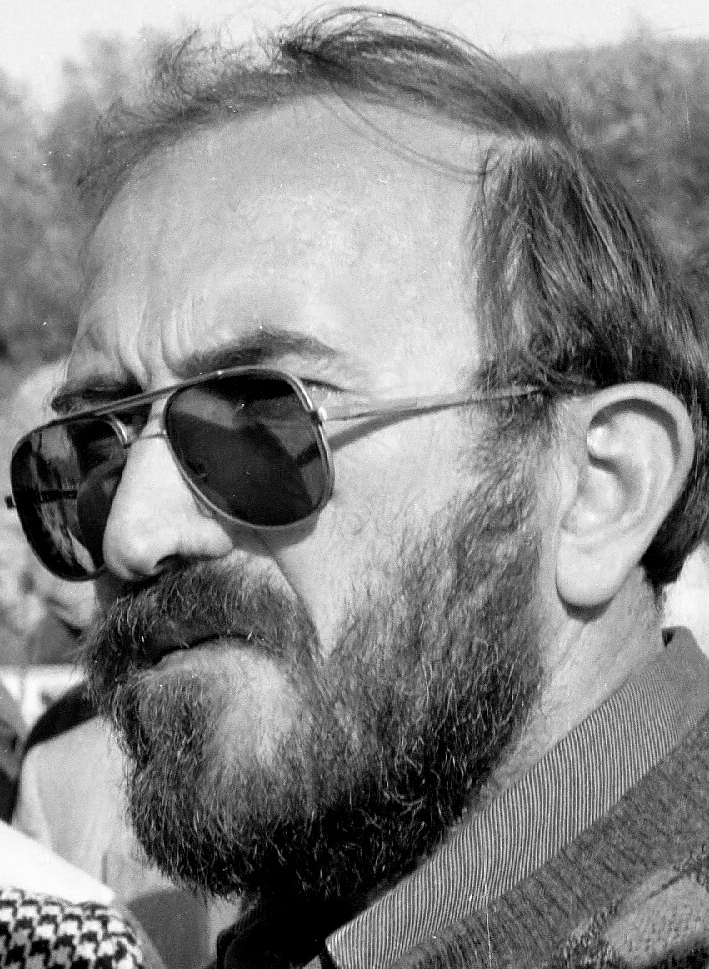
- Resolution 1993 called for the arrest of Goran Hadžić
- Date: 29 June 2011
- Meeting no.: 6,571
- Code: S/RES/1993 (Document)
- Subject: International Tribunal for the former Yugoslavia
- Voting summary: 15 voted for; None voted against; None abstained
- Result: Adopted

Security Council composition
- Permanent members: China; France; Russia; United Kingdom; United States
- Non-permanent members: Bosnia–Herzegovina; Brazil; Colombia; Germany; Gabon; India; Lebanon; Nigeria; Portugal; South Africa

United Nations Security Council Resolution 1993, adopted unanimously on June 29, 2011, after recalling resolutions 827 (1993), 1503 (2003) and 1534 (2003), the Council extended the terms of office of 17 permanent and temporary judges at the International Criminal Tribunal for the former Yugoslavia (ICTY).

== Resolution ==
=== Observations ===
In Resolution 1966 (2010), the Security Council had established a mechanism whereby it expected the ICTY to complete its work by December 31, 2014. The Council recalled Resolution 1931 (2010) which expressed the intention to renew the terms of judges. There was also concern at staffing levels at the ICTY and the implications on the work of the tribunal.

=== Acts ===
Under Chapter VII of the United Nations Charter, the Council extended the terms of the following permanent judges until December 31, 2012, or until the completion of their cases:

- Jean-Claude Antonetti (France)
- Guy Delvoie (Belgium)
- Burton Hall (Bahamas)
- Christoph Flügge (Germany)
- O-Gon Kwon (South Korea)
- Bakone Justice Moloto (South Africa)
- Howard Morrison (United Kingdom)
- Alphons Orie (Netherlands)

The terms of the following temporary ad litem judges were extended until December 31, 2012, or until the completion of their cases:

- Melville Baird (Trinidad and Tobago)
- Elizabeth Gwaunza (Zimbabwe)
- Frederik Harhoff (Denmark)
- Flavia Lattanzi (Italy)
- Antoine Kesia-Mbe Mindua (Democratic Republic of Congo)
- Prisca Matimba Nyambe (Zambia)
- Michèle Picard (France)
- Árpád Prandler (Hungary)
- Stefan Trechsel (Switzerland)

The resolution reiterated the importance of co-operation of all states with the ICTY and of the trial of all persons indicted, particularly calling for the arrest of Goran Hadžić. Adequate levels of staffing were also important at the ICTY in order for it to complete its work and the issue had to be addressed.

Finally, the Council praised states that had concluded agreements with the enforcement of sentences of persons convicted by the ICTY to serve their sentences in their territories, and urged countries that had not concluded agreements to do so.

== See also ==
- Breakup of Yugoslavia
- List of people indicted in the International Criminal Tribunal for the former Yugoslavia
- List of United Nations Security Council Resolutions 1901 to 2000 (2009 – 2011)
- Yugoslav Wars
