= United Nations Security Council Resolution 1982 =

UN Security Council Resolution 1982
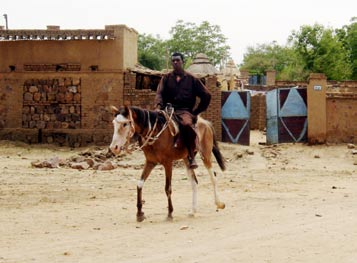
- Janjaweed militia in Sudan
- Date: 17 May 2011
- Meeting no.: 6,537
- Code: S/RES/1982 (Document)
- Subject: The situation in Sudan
- Voting summary: 15 voted for; None voted against; None abstained
- Result: Adopted

Security Council composition
- Permanent members: China; France; Russia; United Kingdom; United States
- Non-permanent members: Bosnia–Herzegovina; Brazil; Colombia; Germany; Gabon; India; Lebanon; Nigeria; Portugal; South Africa

United Nations Security Council Resolution 1982, adopted unanimously on May 17, 2011, after recalling all previous resolutions on the situation in Sudan, the Council extended the mandate of an expert panel monitoring the arms embargo and other sanctions against the country until February 19, 2012.

== Observations ==
The Security Council recalled a report by the expert panel and determined the situation in Sudan to remain a threat to international peace and security in the region.

== Acts ==
Acting under Chapter VII of the United Nations Charter, the Council reaffirmed the importance of measures set out in previous resolutions, including Resolution 1945 (2010). It decided to extend the mandate of the expert panel–established in Resolution 1591 (2005)–monitoring sanctions against Sudan, including an arms embargo, until February 19, 2012.

The panel was required to provide a report to the Council 30 days before the end of its mandate.

== See also ==
- African Union – United Nations Hybrid Operation in Darfur
- List of United Nations Security Council Resolutions 1901 to 2000 (2009–2011)
- Second Sudanese Civil War
- War in Darfur
