= United Nations Security Council Resolution 1986 =

UN Security Council Resolution 1986
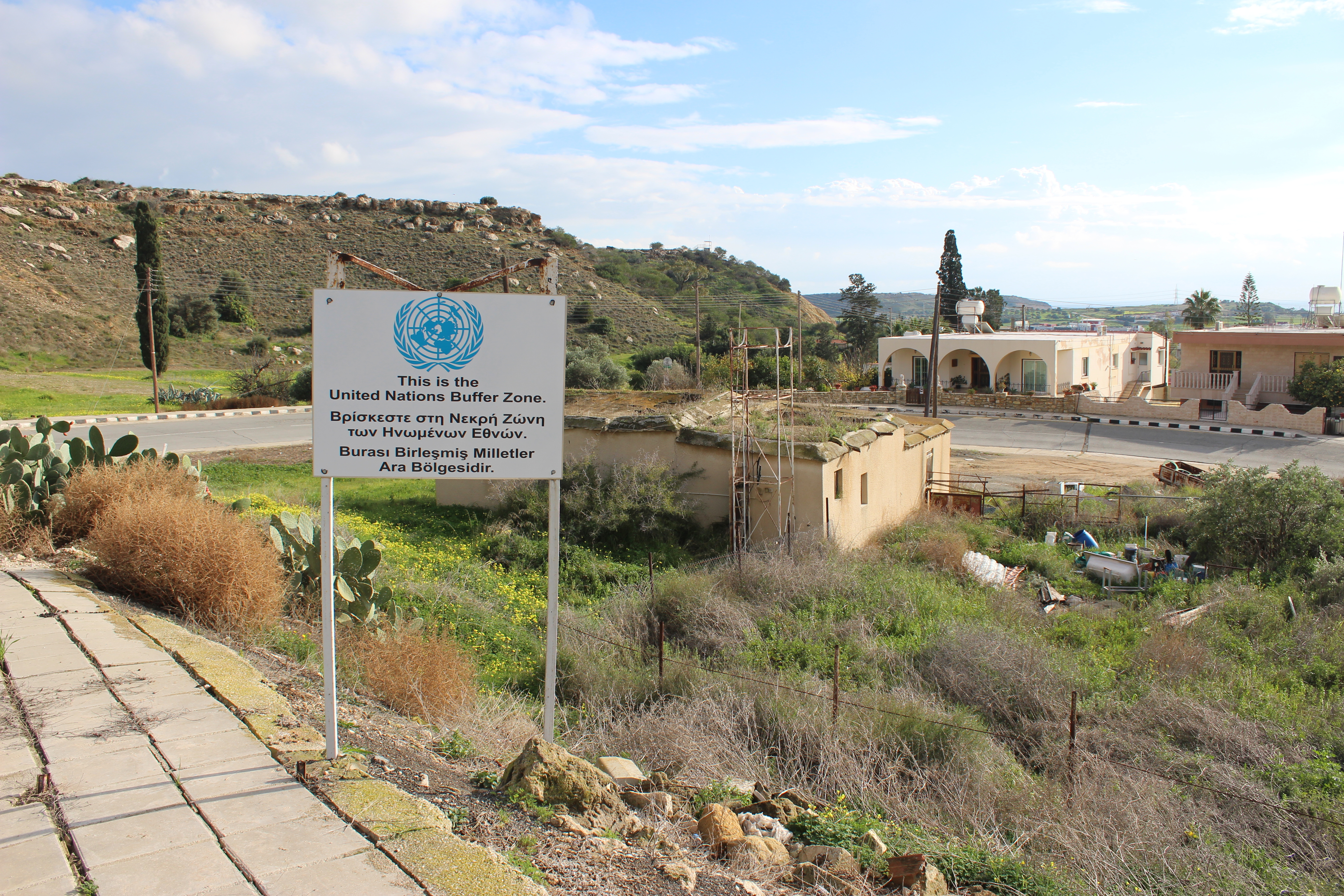
- Buffer zone in Cyprus
- Date: 13 June 2011
- Meeting no.: 6,554
- Code: S/RES/1986 (Document)
- Subject: The situation in Cyprus
- Voting summary: 15 voted for; None voted against; None abstained
- Result: Adopted

Security Council composition
- Permanent members: China; France; Russia; United Kingdom; United States
- Non-permanent members: Bosnia–Herzegovina; Brazil; Colombia; Germany; Gabon; India; Lebanon; Nigeria; Portugal; South Africa

United Nations Security Council Resolution 1986, adopted unanimously on June 13, 2011, after reaffirming all resolutions on the situation in Cyprus, particularly resolutions 1251 (1999) and 1953 (2010), the Council extended the mandate of the United Nations Peacekeeping Force in Cyprus (UNFICYP) for a further six months until December 15, 2011, calling for an intensification of negotiations between the Greek and Turkish Cypriot leaders.

== Resolution ==
=== Observations ===
The Security Council noted that the Cypriot government had agreed to the continued presence of UNFICYP on the island. A solution to the conflict was down to the Cypriots themselves, and there was a unique opportunity to achieve a lasting settlement. There was progress in the peace talks though the Council remained concerned that progress was slow and at the "unacceptability" of the status quo. It welcomed the implementation of confidence-building measures by both Cyprus and Northern Cyprus and encouraged further crossing points to be opened along the Green Line.

The Council remained convinced that a durable settlement of the Cyprus dispute would be beneficial for all Cypriots and the situation in the buffer zone would improve if both sides accepted the 1989 aide-mémoire used by the United Nations. It was convinced that undermining the credibility of the United Nations was detrimental to the peace process. Furthermore, the Council welcomed progress in demining activities, the efforts of the Committee on Missing Persons, and agreed that the active participation of civil society groups and bi-communal contacts was essential to the political process. There was a need to focus public messages on the "way ahead".

=== Acts ===
The resolution welcomed the progress of negotiations and the prospect of progress in the near future towards a settlement. In this regard, it called on the two Cypriot leaders to intensify negotiations, improve their atmosphere, and increase the participation of civil society. Furthermore, both sides were called upon to participate in consultations on the demarcation of the buffer zone and the 1989 aide-mémoire.

The Turkish Cypriot side was urged to restore the military status quo in Strovilia that existed there before June 30, 2000. It also called for access for deminers. Finally, the Secretary-General Ban Ki-moon was requested to submit a report by December 1, 2011 on the implementation of the current resolution.

== See also ==
- Cyprus dispute
- List of United Nations Security Council Resolutions 1901 to 2000 (2009 – 2011)
- United Nations Buffer Zone in Cyprus
- Turkish invasion of Cyprus
