= United Nations Security Council Resolution 1930 =

UN Security Council Resolution 1930
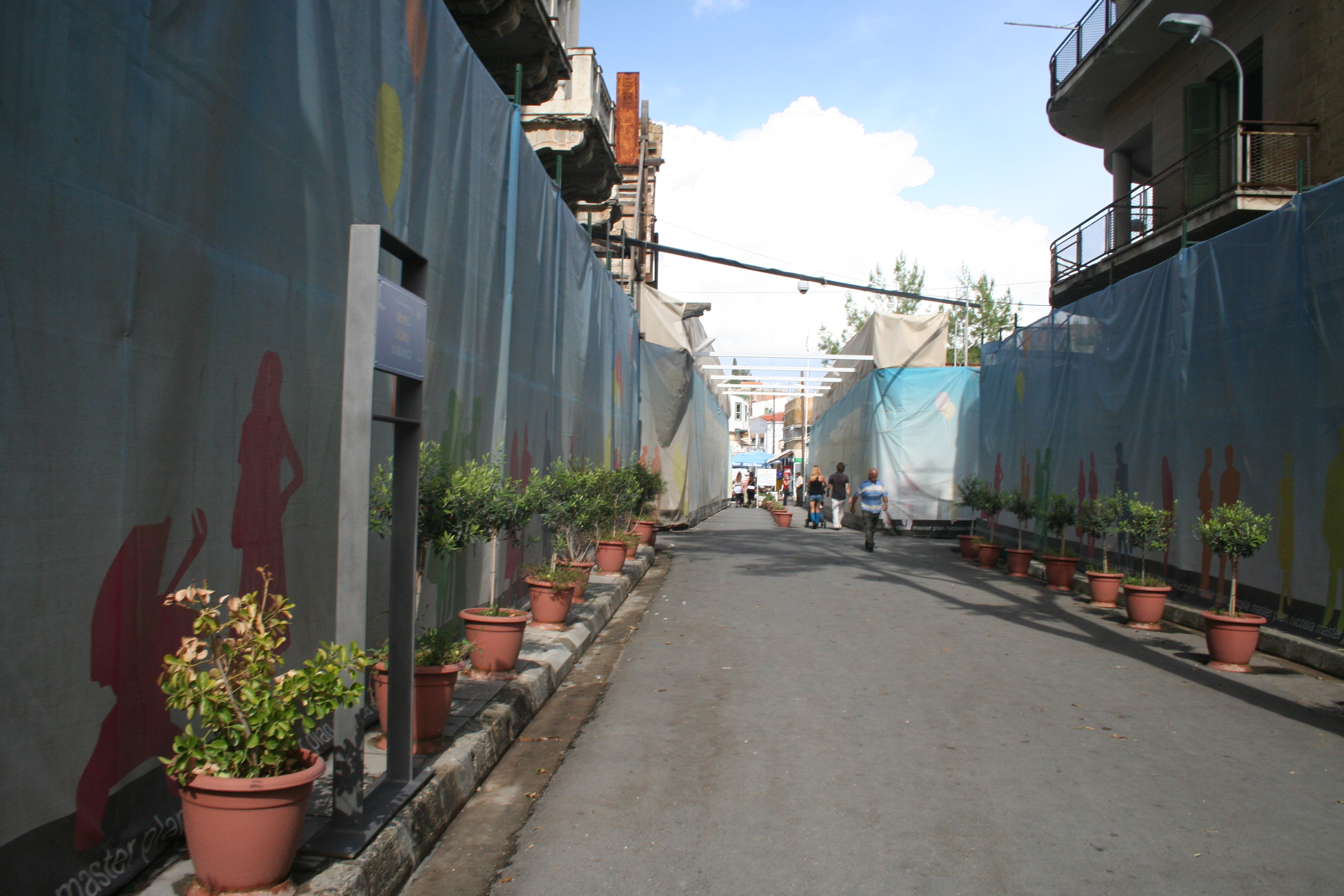
- Ledra Street in Nicosia
- Date: 15 June 2010
- Meeting no.: 6,339
- Code: S/RES/1930 (Document)
- Subject: The situation in Cyprus
- Voting summary: 14 voted for; 1 voted against; None abstained
- Result: Adopted

Security Council composition
- Permanent members: China; France; Russia; United Kingdom; United States
- Non-permanent members: Austria; Bosnia–Herzegovina; Brazil; Gabon; Japan; Lebanon; Mexico; Nigeria; Turkey; Uganda

United Nations Security Council Resolution 1930, adopted on June 15, 2010, after reaffirming all resolutions on the situation in Cyprus, particularly Resolution 1251 (1999), the Council extended the mandate of the United Nations Peacekeeping Force in Cyprus (UNFICYP) for a further six months until December 15, 2010 while negotiations towards a settlement of the dispute on the island were underway.

The resolution, sponsored by China, France, Russia, the United Kingdom and United States, was adopted by 14 votes to one against from Turkey. The Turkish representative said that Resolution 1930, like all previous Security Council resolutions extending UNFICYP, was formulated as if there was only one government on the island.

== Resolution ==
=== Observations ===
The Security Council noted that the Cypriot government had agreed to the continued presence of UNFICYP on the island. A solution to the conflict was down to the Cypriots themselves, and there was a unique opportunity to achieve a lasting settlement. Negotiations were under way and it was still hoped that a solution would be found in 2010. It welcomed the implementation of confidence-building measures by both Cyprus and Northern Cyprus and encouraged further crossing points to be opened along the Green Line.

The Council remained convinced that a durable settlement of the Cyprus dispute would be beneficial for all Cypriots and the situation in the buffer zone would improve if both sides accepted the 1989 aide-mémoire used by the United Nations. It welcomed progress in demining activities; the efforts of the Committee on Missing Persons; the appointment of Lisa Buttenheim as the Secretary-General's new Special Representative; and agreed that the active participation of civil society groups and bi-communal contacts was essential to the political process.

=== Acts ===
The resolution welcomed the progress of negotiations and the prospect of progress in the near future towards a settlement. In this regard, it called for the full exploitation of the United Nations-backed talks and the implementation of other confidence-building measures as indicated in the Secretary-General's report. Furthermore, both sides were called upon to participate in consultations on the demarcation of the buffer zone and the 1989 aide-mémoire. The talks were established in 2008 with the aim of working towards a bi-federal, bi-zonal with political equality.

The Turkish Cypriot side was urged to restore the military status quo in Strovilia that existed there before June 30, 2000. Finally, the Secretary-General Ban Ki-moon was requested to submit a report by December 1, 2010 on the implementation of the current resolution.

== See also ==
- Cyprus dispute
- List of United Nations Security Council Resolutions 1901 to 2000 (2009–2011)
- United Nations Buffer Zone in Cyprus
- Turkish Invasion of Cyprus
