= United Nations Security Council Resolution 1994 =

UN Security Council Resolution 1994
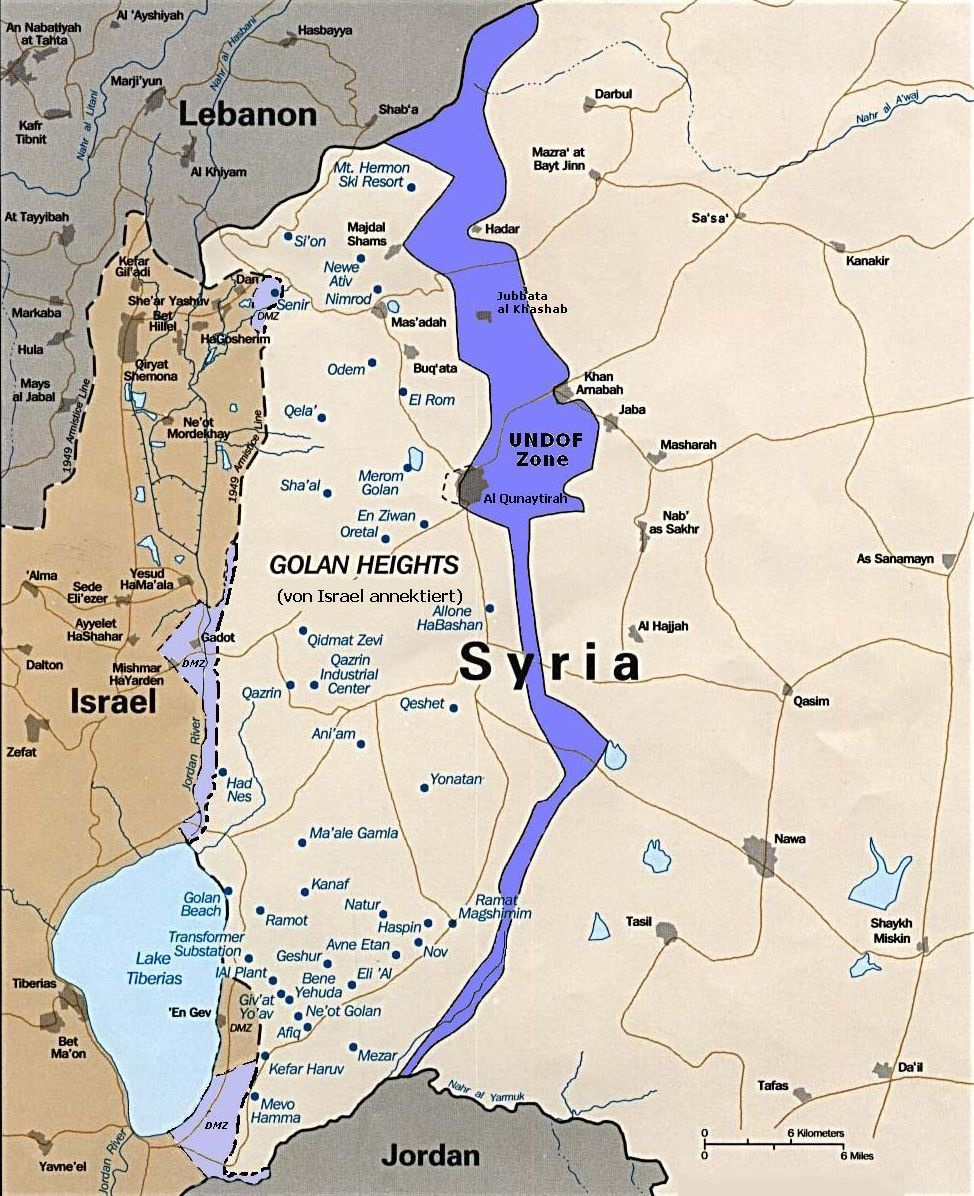
- UNDOF area in the Golan Heights
- Date: 30 June 2011
- Meeting no.: 6,572
- Code: S/RES/1994 (Document)
- Subject: The situation in the Middle East
- Voting summary: 15 voted for; None voted against; None abstained
- Result: Adopted

Security Council composition
- Permanent members: China; France; Russia; United Kingdom; United States
- Non-permanent members: Bosnia–Herzegovina; Brazil; Colombia; Germany; Gabon; India; Lebanon; Nigeria; Portugal; South Africa

United Nations Security Council Resolution 1994, adopted unanimously on 30 June 2011, after considering a report by the Secretary-General Ban Ki-moon regarding the United Nations Disengagement Observer Force (UNDOF), the Council extended its mandate for a further six months until 31 December 2011.

UNDOF was established in 1974 by Resolution 350 (1974) to monitor the ceasefire between Israel and Syria.

== Adoption ==
During discussions, some Council members—such as France, Germany, the United Kingdom and United States—expressed concern that recent violence along Israel's border with Syria had been instigated by the Syrian government in an attempt to divert attention away from a domestic uprising as part of the Arab Spring; however, Russia and China said the issues should not be interlinked, nor were on the Council's agenda.

== Details ==
The Security Council called for the implementation of Resolution 338 (1973) which demanded negotiations take place between the parties for a peaceful settlement of the situation in the Middle East. It called for all parties to respect the 1974 ceasefire agreement, which had been placed in "jeopardy" due to recent violence. Meanwhile, Council members welcomed UNDOF's efforts to implement the Secretary-General's zero-tolerance policy on sexual exploitation and abuse.

Finally, the Secretary-General was requested to report before the end of UNDOF's mandate on measures to implement Resolution 338 and developments in the situation. The report of the Secretary-General pursuant to the previous resolution on UNDOF indicated that the situation in the Middle East continued to remain tense until a settlement could be reached, with the Secretary-General encouraging peace talks to resume which were broke off in December 2008.

== See also ==
- Arab–Israeli conflict
- Golan Heights
- Israel–Syria relations
- List of United Nations Security Council Resolutions 1901 to 2000 (2009 – 2011)
