= United Nations Security Council Resolution 1738 =

UN Security Council Resolution 1738
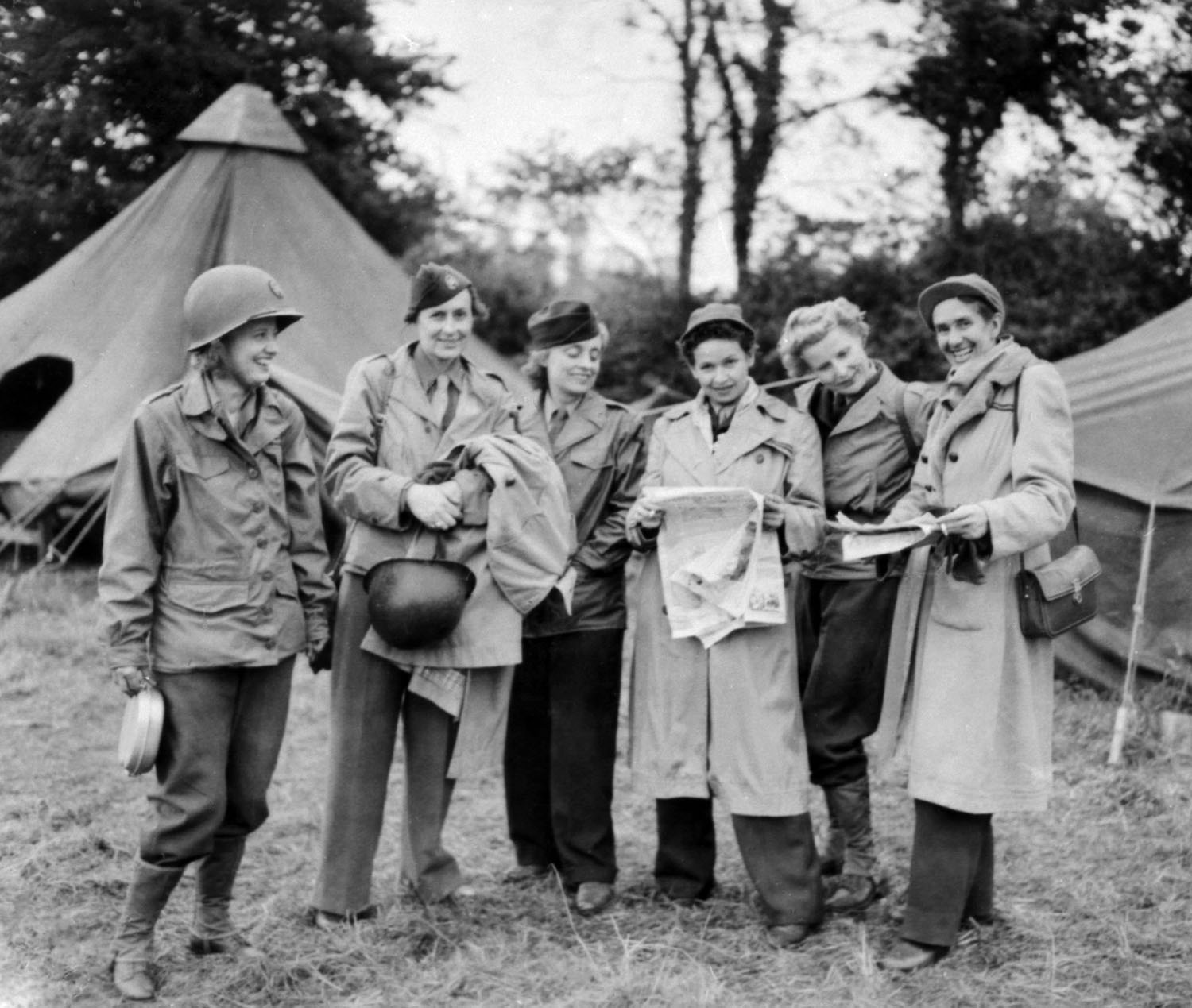
- Female correspondents during World War II
- Date: 23 December 2006
- Meeting no.: 5,613
- Code: S/RES/1738 (Document)
- Subject: Protection of civilians in armed conflict
- Voting summary: 15 voted for; None voted against; None abstained
- Result: Adopted

Security Council composition
- Permanent members: China; France; Russia; United Kingdom; United States
- Non-permanent members: Argentina; Rep. of the Congo; Denmark; Ghana; Greece; Japan; Peru; Qatar; Slovakia; Tanzania

United Nations Security Council Resolution 1738, adopted unanimously on December 23, 2006, after reaffirming resolutions 1265 (1999), 1296 (2000), 1502 (2003) and 1674 (2006) on the protection of civilians in armed conflict, the Council condemned attacks against journalists in conflict situations. It was the last resolution adopted by the Security Council in 2006.

The text was sponsored by France and Greece. The passage of Resolution 1738 was welcomed by media freedom groups such as Reporters Without Borders.

== Resolution ==
=== Observations ===
In the preamble of the resolution, the Security Council reaffirmed its responsibility in the maintenance of international peace and security under the United Nations Charter, while further reaffirming that parties to armed conflict were responsible in taking steps to protect civilians. In this context, it recalled the Geneva Conventions and Protocols I and II, with particular attention to references concerning the protection of journalists. There were also existing prohibitions in international law against the deliberate targeting of civilians in armed conflict and Council members called for those responsible for attacks to be brought to justice.

The resolution reaffirmed the need for a broad strategy of conflict prevention which addressed the causes of the conflict in order to protect civilians. It expressed concern at acts of violence against journalists, media professionals and associated personnel, in violation of international humanitarian law. Furthermore, the Council recognised that the issue of protecting journalists in armed conflict was "urgent and important".

=== Acts ===
Resolution 1738 condemned attacks on journalists, media and associated personnel, calling for an end to such practices. It stated that these personnel were to be considered as civilians and had to be protected and respected. Additionally, equipment and installations used by the media were also considered to constitute civilian objects and thus were not to be the target of any military action.

The Council also deplored incitement to violence in the media, further stating that it would take further action against media broadcasts inciting genocide, crimes against humanity and violations of international humanitarian law. All parties involved in conflict had to comply fully with their obligations concerning the protection of civilians in armed conflict, including media personnel.

Council members regarded the deliberate targeting of civilians and other protected persons in conflict as a threat to international peace and security and expressed an intention to consider further action if necessary. States that had not become party to the Additional Protocols of the Geneva Conventions were invited to do so.

== See also ==
- Laws of war
- List of United Nations Security Council Resolutions 1701 to 1800 (2006–2008)
- List of ongoing military conflicts
