= United Nations Security Council Resolution 1947 =

UN Security Council Resolution 1947
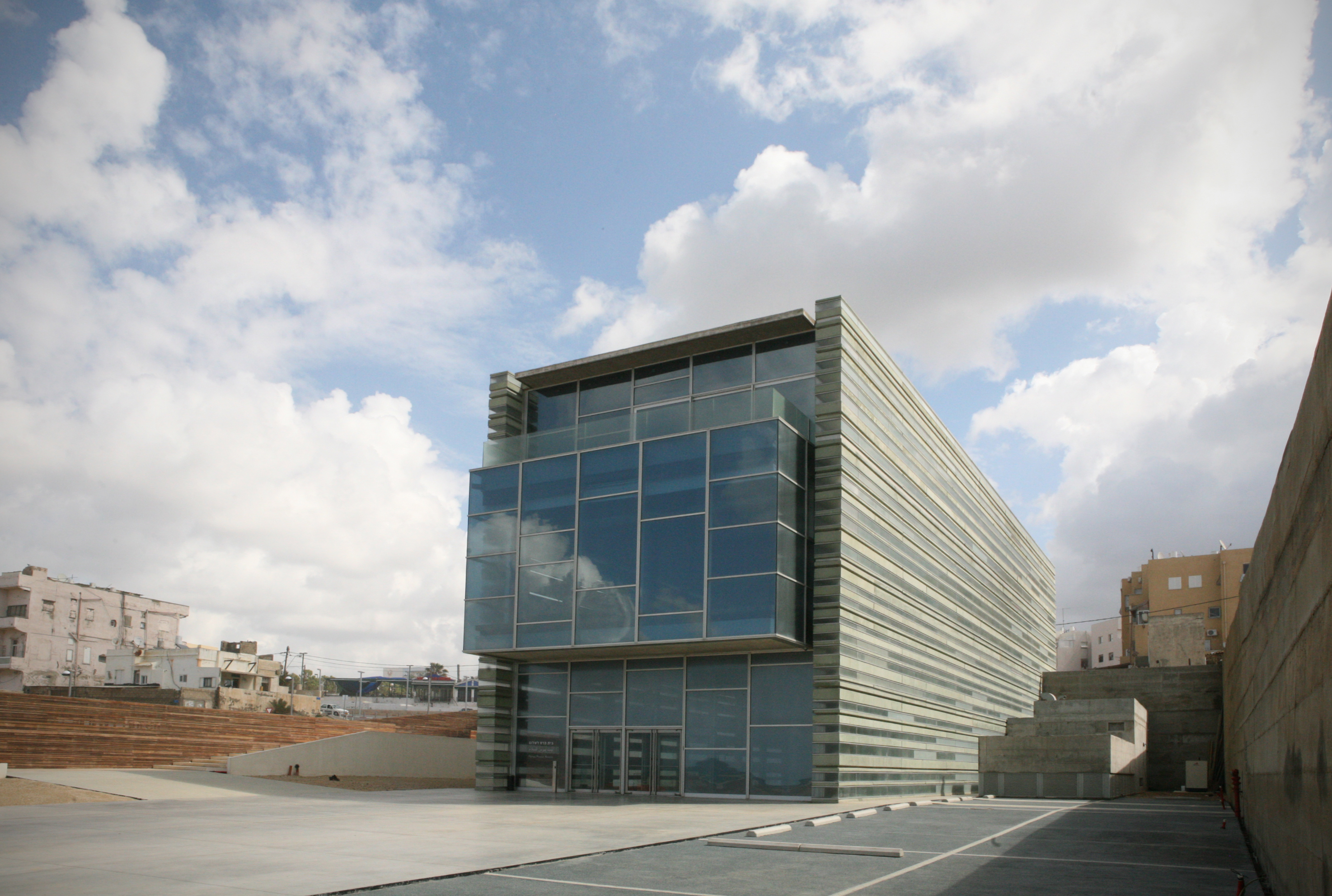
- Peres Center for Peace in Tel Aviv
- Date: 29 October 2010
- Meeting no.: 6,414
- Code: S/RES/1946 (Document)
- Subject: Post-conflict peacebuilding
- Voting summary: 15 voted for; None voted against; None abstained
- Result: Adopted

Security Council composition
- Permanent members: China; France; Russia; United Kingdom; United States
- Non-permanent members: Austria; Bosnia–Herzegovina; Brazil; Gabon; Japan; Lebanon; Mexico; Nigeria; Turkey; Uganda

United Nations Security Council Resolution 1947, adopted unanimously on October 29, 2010, after recalling Resolution 1645 (2005), the Council reaffirmed the role of the United Nations Peacebuilding Commission within the organisation.

The Security Council began by reaffirming the importance of peacebuilding carried out by the United Nations and the need for continued support in this area. It recognised the role of the Peacebuilding Commission to address the needs of countries emerging from conflict towards peace.

The resolution welcomed a review of United Nations peacebuilding and all United Nations actors were requested to take forward recommendations contained in the report to improve the effectiveness of the Peacebuilding Commission. Adequate support and resources for peacebuilding efforts were recognised by the Council to meet challenges. The Peacebuilding Council was instructed to report on progress towards meeting the recommendations contained in the review in its annual reports to the Security Council.

Finally, a further comprehensive review was called for five years after the adoption of the current resolution.

== See also ==
- Environmental peacebuilding
- List of United Nations Security Council Resolutions 1901 to 2000 (2009–2011)
- Peacekeeping
- Peacemaking
- United Nations Peacebuilding Fund
