= United Nations Security Council Resolution 1926 =

UN Security Council Resolution 1926
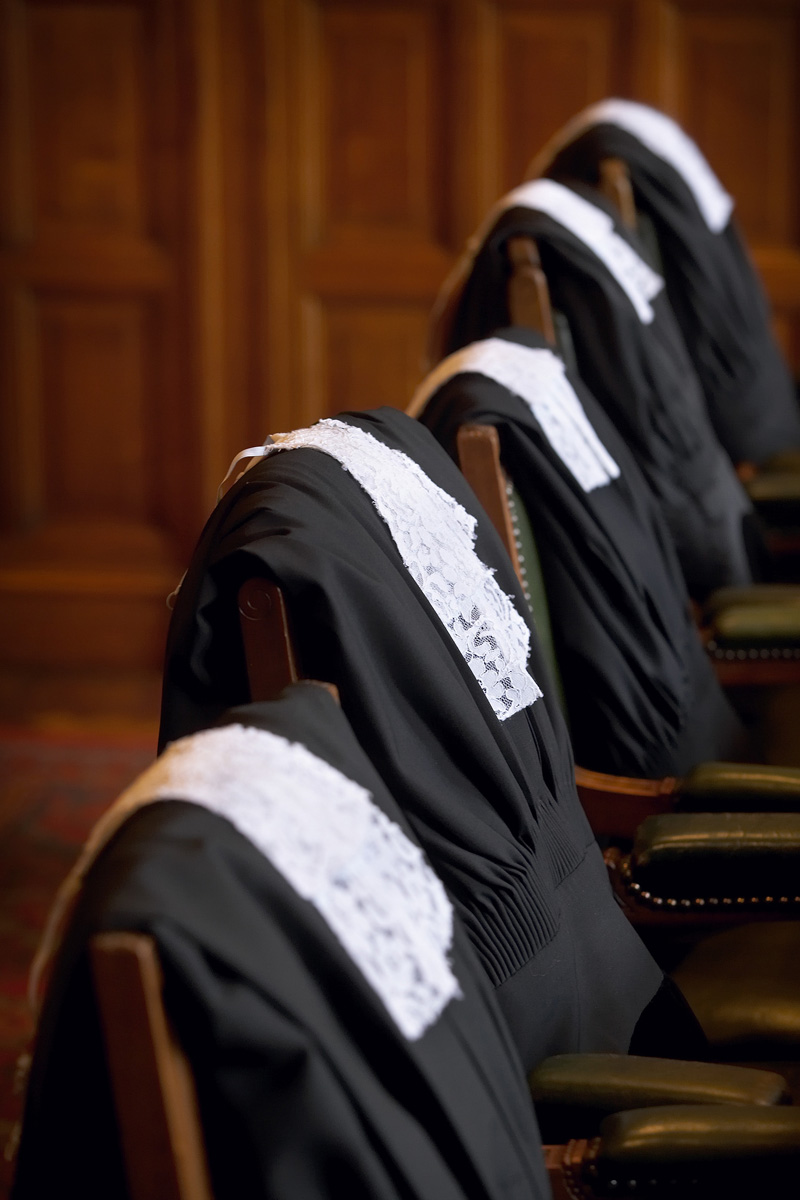
- Robes at the ICJ
- Date: 2 June 2010
- Meeting no.: 6,327
- Code: S/RES/1926 (Document)
- Subject: International Court of Justice
- Voting summary: 15 voted for; None voted against; None abstained
- Result: Adopted

Security Council composition
- Permanent members: China; France; Russia; United Kingdom; United States
- Non-permanent members: Austria; Bosnia–Herzegovina; Brazil; Gabon; Japan; Lebanon; Mexico; Nigeria; Turkey; Uganda

United Nations Security Council Resolution 1926, adopted unanimously on June 2, 2010, after noting the resignation of International Court of Justice (ICJ) judge Thomas Buergenthal with effect from September 6, 2010. The Council decided that the election to fill the vacancy would take place on September 9, 2010 at a meeting of the Security Council and at a meeting of the General Assembly.

The vacancy had to be filled in accordance with the Statute of the ICJ. Buergenthal had served at the ICJ since March 2000. He was re-elected in 2006 to serve a nine-year term beginning in February 2006.

== See also ==
- Judges of the International Court of Justice
- List of United Nations Security Council Resolutions 1901 to 2000 (2009–2011)
