= United Nations Security Council Resolution 1961 =

UN Security Council Resolution 1961
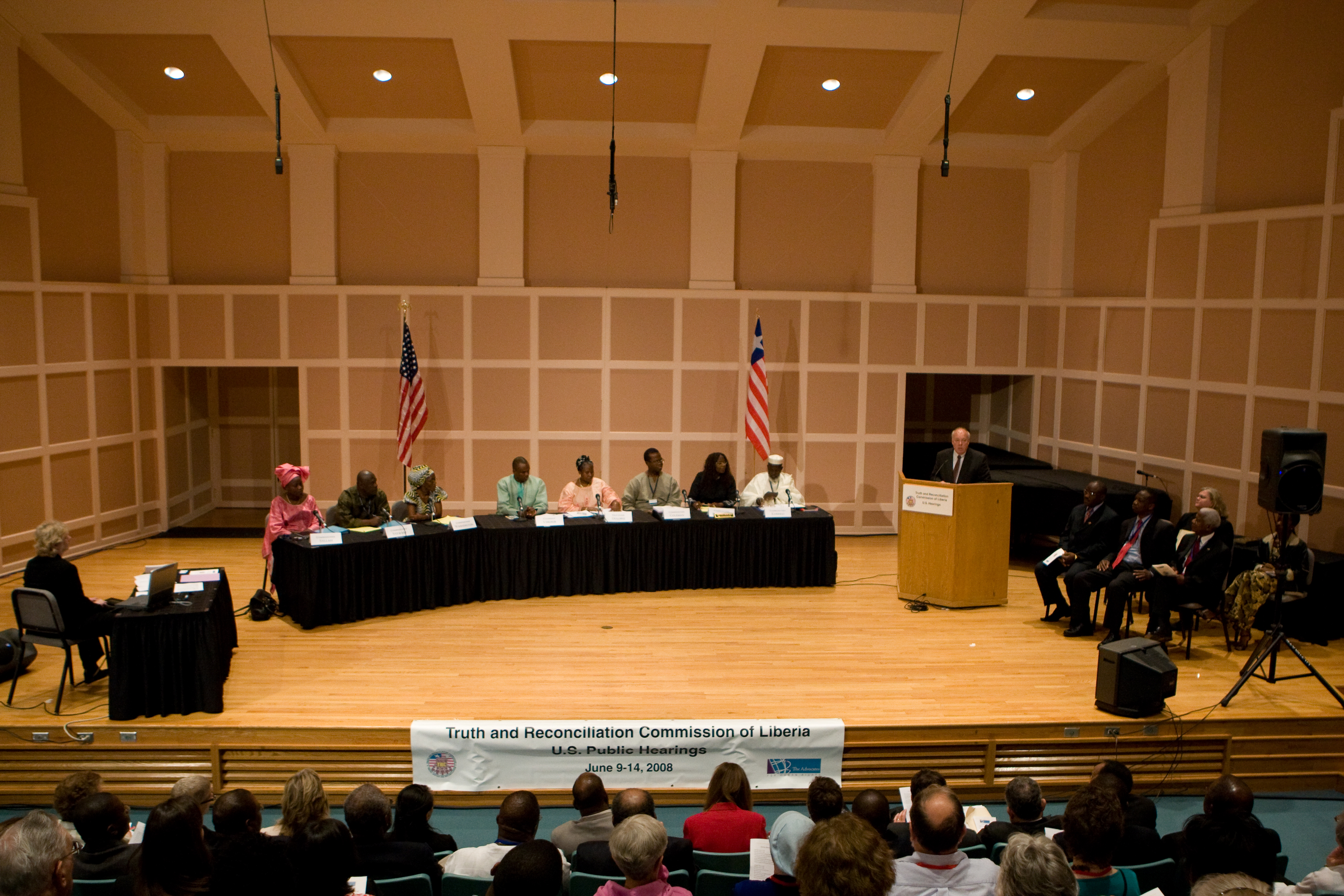
- Liberian Truth and Reconciliation Commission
- Date: 17 December 2010
- Meeting no.: 6,454
- Code: S/RES/1961 (Document)
- Subject: The situation in Liberia
- Voting summary: 15 voted for; None voted against; None abstained
- Result: Adopted

Security Council composition
- Permanent members: China; France; Russia; United Kingdom; United States
- Non-permanent members: Austria; Bosnia–Herzegovina; Brazil; Gabon; Japan; Lebanon; Mexico; Nigeria; Turkey; Uganda

United Nations Security Council Resolution 1961, adopted unanimously on December 17, 2010, after recalling previous resolutions on the situation in Liberia, the Council renewed an arms embargo against the country and travel sanctions for persons that threatened the peace process for a further twelve months.

== Resolution ==
=== Observations ===
In the preamble of the resolution, the Council welcomed progress made by the Liberian government in rebuilding the country since January 2006. It noted decisions not to extend sanctions relating to timber and diamonds described in Resolution 1521 (2003). Despite progress, the Council regarded the situation in Liberia as a threat to peace and security in the region. The United Nations Mission in Liberia (UNMIL) had to continue to improve security throughout Liberia.

=== Acts ===
Acting under Chapter VII of the United Nations Charter, travel restrictions and an arms embargo were extended for an additional twelve months. Financial sanctions imposed in 2004 were to remain in force, given the lack of progress in implementing financial measures. The Council declared that if conditions were met then the sanctions would be reviewed, which included the freezing of former President Charles Taylor's assets.

Finally, the mandate of an expert panel monitoring the sanctions was extended for a year until December 16, 2011.

== See also ==
- List of United Nations Security Council Resolutions 1901 to 2000 (2009–2011)
- Second Liberian Civil War
