= United Nations Security Council Resolution 1964 =

UN Security Council Resolution 1964
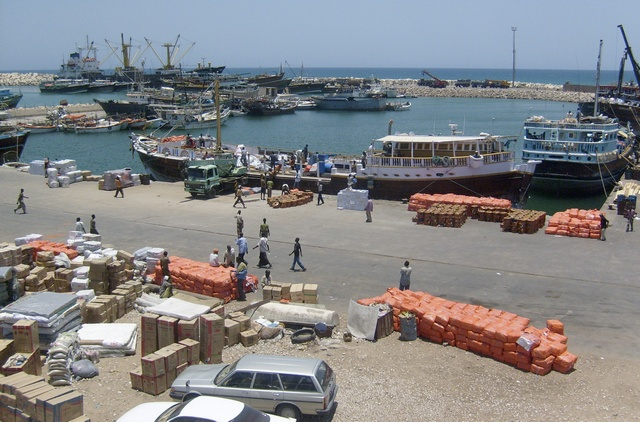
- The port of Bosaso in Somalia
- Date: 22 December 2010
- Meeting no.: 6,461
- Code: S/RES/1964 (Document)
- Subject: The situation in Somalia
- Voting summary: 15 voted for; None voted against; None abstained
- Result: Adopted

Security Council composition
- Permanent members: China; France; Russia; United Kingdom; United States
- Non-permanent members: Austria; Bosnia–Herzegovina; Brazil; Gabon; Japan; Lebanon; Mexico; Nigeria; Turkey; Uganda

United Nations Security Council Resolution 1964, adopted unanimously on December 22, 2010, after recalling previous resolutions on the situation in Somalia, the Council authorised the continuation of the mandate of the African Union Mission to Somalia (AMISOM) until September 30, 2011, and increased its size from 8,000 to 12,000 personnel.

The Security Council said the increase was to protect the government and civilian population from al-Shabaab Islamist rebels and other groups. African Nations had requested a total of 20,000 troops, however the Security Council felt this number was excessive.

== Resolution ==
=== Observations ===
In the preamble of the resolution, the Council reaffirmed its support of the Djibouti Peace Process and the role of the Transitional Federal Government. It stated that the parties in Somalia had to renounce violence and co-operate in order to bring about peace and stability in the country. The Council commended the role of AMISOM and the contributions of Burundi and Uganda to the force, and reiterated the importance of fully functioning security services in Somalia.

Meanwhile, there was concern about the humanitarian situation in the country, and attacks on humanitarian aid workers; all violence and human rights violations against the civilian population and aid workers were condemned. Furthermore, concern was expressed at the decline in humanitarian funding for Somalia, with the Council urging states to contribute.

=== Acts ===
Acting under Chapter VII of the United Nations Charter, African Union member states were authorised to continue their mission in Somalia until September 30, 2011, and increase the size of AMISOM to 12,000 personnel, up from 8,000. The Secretary-General Ban Ki-moon was instructed to provide logistical services to the operation. It recalled its intention within Resolution 1863 (2008) to consider the possibility of establishing a United Nations peacekeeping mission in Somalia.

The resolution called for the safety of humanitarian workers to be guaranteed; the end of violence and human rights violations against the population; and welcomed efforts of United Nations offices and agencies to increase the presence of the United Nations in Somalia.

== See also ==
- List of United Nations Security Council Resolutions 1901 to 2000 (2009–2011)
- Somali Civil War
- Somali Civil War (2009–present)
