= United Nations Security Council Resolution 1991 =

UN Security Council Resolution 1991
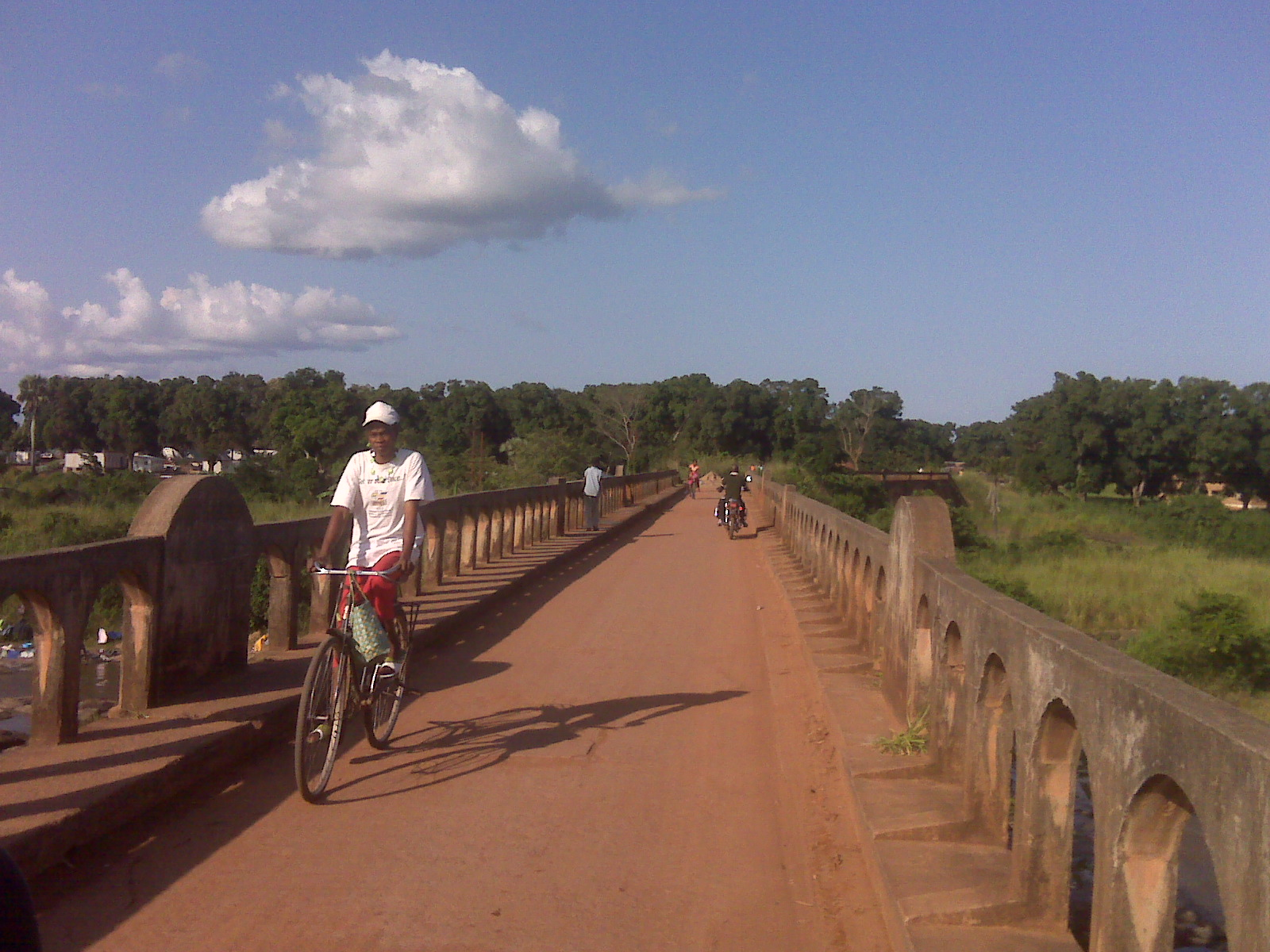
- Dungu in northeastern Democratic Republic of the Congo
- Date: 28 June 2011
- Meeting no.: 6,568
- Code: S/RES/1991 (Document)
- Subject: The situation in the Democratic Republic of the Congo
- Voting summary: 15 voted for; None voted against; None abstained
- Result: Adopted

Security Council composition
- Permanent members: China; France; Russia; United Kingdom; United States
- Non-permanent members: Bosnia–Herzegovina; Brazil; Colombia; Germany; Gabon; India; Lebanon; Nigeria; Portugal; South Africa

United Nations Security Council Resolution 1991, adopted unanimously on June 28, 2011, after reaffirming previous resolutions on the situation in the Democratic Republic of the Congo, the Council extended the mandate of the United Nations Organization Stabilization Mission in the Democratic Republic of the Congo (MONUSCO) until June 30, 2012.

The resolution was drafted by France.

== Resolution ==
=== Observations ===
In the preamble of the resolution, the Council noted that the overall security situation in the Democratic Republic of the Congo had improved in recent years, but there were still major problems with armed groups and human rights abuses in the east of the country. Improved regional co-operation on economic stability in the Great Lakes region was further encouraged and praised.

Furthermore, it was important that free, fair and credible general elections planned for November 2011 were held. The Security Council also condemned attacks on United Nations and humanitarian personnel, and acknowledged the losses that the MONUSCO mission had already suffered.

=== Acts ===
The Chapter VII resolution renewed the mandate of MONUSCO for a further period of one year until the end of June 2012. The Security Council confirmed that the priority was to protect civilians, while the Congolese government remained responsible for their safety. The configuration of MONUSCO would depend on the situation on the ground: the military operations in the northeast, the enhanced capacities of the government and the extension of state authority throughout the country.

Meanwhile, Council members demanded that rebel groups, such as the Democratic Forces for the Liberation of Rwanda and the Lord's Resistance Army immediately end all violence and human rights abuses. There was also concern at the promotion of individuals suspected of abuses in the country's security forces.

The resolution further decided that MONUSCO could provide support to local, provincial and national elections where requested by the Congolese authorities. The detention of Bernard Munyagishari at the International Criminal Tribunal for Rwanda was welcomed.

== See also ==
- Dongo conflict
- Ituri conflict
- Kivu conflict
- List of United Nations Security Council Resolutions 1901 to 2000 (2009 – 2011)
