= United Nations Security Council Resolution 1937 =

UN Security Council Resolution 1937
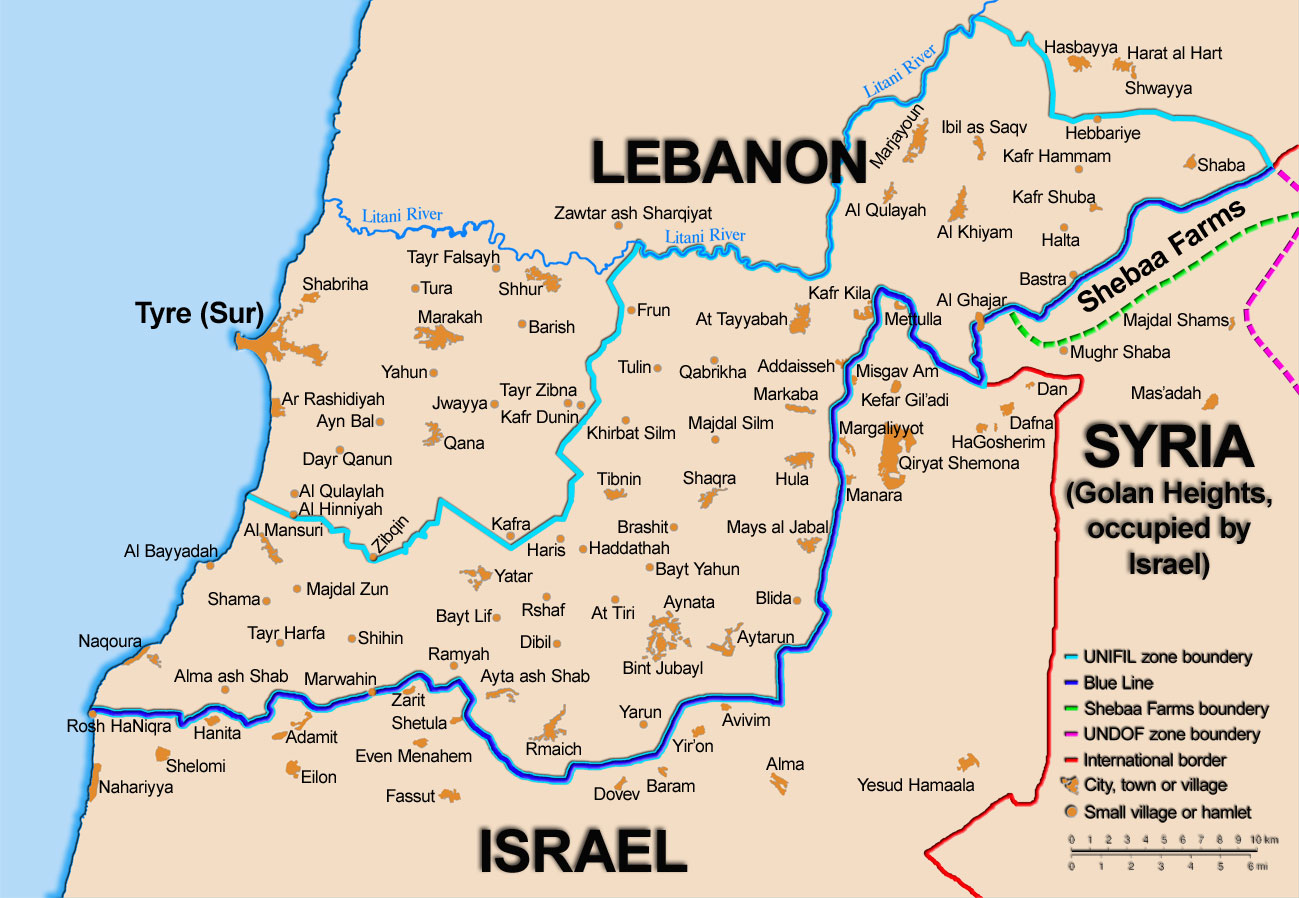
- Blue Line along the Israel–Lebanon border
- Date: 30 August 2010
- Meeting no.: 6,375
- Code: S/RES/1937 (Document)
- Subject: The situation in the Middle East
- Voting summary: 15 voted for; None voted against; None abstained
- Result: Adopted

Security Council composition
- Permanent members: China; France; Russia; United Kingdom; United States
- Non-permanent members: Austria; Bosnia–Herzegovina; Brazil; Gabon; Japan; Lebanon; Mexico; Nigeria; Turkey; Uganda

United Nations Security Council Resolution 1937 was a resolution passed in the wake of the recent 2010 Israel–Lebanon border clash, requested by the Lebanese government and adopted unanimously on August 30, 2010, that extended the mandate of the United Nations Interim Force in Lebanon (UNIFIL) for a further twelve months—until August 31, 2011—and called upon all parties to respect the Blue Line.

The resolution specifically recalled eight past resolutions: 425 (1978), 426 (1978), 1559 (2004), 1680 (2006), 1701 (2006), 1773 (2007), 1832 (2008), and 1884 (2009).

== Resolution ==
=== Observations ===
The Security Council called upon all parties to fully implement Resolution 1701 and reaffirmed the Security Council's commitment in this regard. It expressed concern at the violation of the resolution on August 3, 2010 during a border clash between the Lebanese Armed Forces and Israel Defense Forces near the Israeli kibbutz of Misgav Am and the Lebanese village of Adaisseh. The Council emphasised full compliance with the arms embargo in Resolution 1701 and called on all parties to respect the Blue Line and to assist with making it clearly visible. It also recalled a request from the Lebanese government to deploy an international force to assist it in exercising its authority throughout the territory and affirmed UNIFIL's authority to take any action it deems necessary in accordance with its mandate.

=== Acts ===
Extending UNIFIL's mandate for another year, the Council commended the force in establishing a new strategic environment in southern Lebanon and its co-operation with the Lebanese Armed Forces. It welcomed the deployment of an additional brigade of Lebanese forces to the south and called for further deployments in accordance with Resolution 1701. All parties were called upon to prevent hostilities and violations of the Blue Line and to fully co-operate with UNIFIL and the United Nations. Deploring recent incidents involving UNIFIL, the Council called on all parties to respect the safety and freedom of movement of the operation.

Meanwhile, the resolution called upon concerned parties to co-operate with the Security Council and Secretary-General Ban Ki-moon to make progress towards a long-term solution and permanent ceasefire. It urged the Israeli government to withdraw its forces from northern Ghajar immediately, and reaffirmed its call to make the area between the Blue Line and the Litani River a zone free of any armed personnel and weapons except for those of UNIFIL and Lebanese national forces.

Addressing the Secretary-General, the Council called on him to continue reporting on the implementation of Resolution 1701 and welcomed efforts to implement his zero-tolerance policy on sexual exploitation and abuse.

Finally, the resolution concluded by stressing the importance of a just and lasting peace in the Middle East based on relevant Security Council resolutions including 242 (1967), 338 (1973), 1515 (2003) and 1850 (2008).

== See also ==
- 2010 Israel–Lebanon border clash
- Blue Line
- Israeli–Lebanese conflict
- List of United Nations Security Council Resolutions 1901 to 2000 (2009–2011)
