= United Nations Security Council Resolution 1903 =

UN Security Council Resolution 1903
- Location of Liberia
- Date: 17 December 2009
- Meeting no.: 6,246
- Code: S/RES/1903 (Document)
- Subject: The situation in Liberia
- Voting summary: 15 voted for; None voted against; None abstained
- Result: Adopted

Security Council composition
- Permanent members: China; France; Russia; United Kingdom; United States
- Non-permanent members: Austria; Burkina Faso; Costa Rica; Croatia; Japan; Libya; Mexico; Turkey; Uganda; Vietnam

United Nations Security Council Resolution 1903, adopted unanimously on December 17, 2009, renewed a travel ban on persons deemed to be a threat to the peace in Liberia for 12 months, demanding the Government of Liberia to continue enforcing an asset freeze imposed upon those sanctioned individuals. The Council also readjusted the arms embargo on the country by allowing the Liberian government and UN peacekeepers in the country to receive certain military materiel for 12 months.

The resolution also extended the mandate of the Panel of Experts for an additional time until 20 December 2010, to monitor the implementation of measures set forward in Resolution 1903. It tasked the Panel to report back on the progress in the timber sector and to cooperate actively with the Kimberley Process Certification Scheme, noting it had terminated previous export bans on diamonds and timber from the country.

After the resolution was passed, Liberia's Deputy Information Minister Cletus Sieh said the action "demonstrates the Liberian Government's commitment to the rebuilding of peace and development in the country" and the determination to improve Liberia's international standing.

== See also ==
- History of Liberia
- List of United Nations Security Council Resolutions 1901 to 2000 (2009–2011)
- United Nations Mission in Liberia
