= United Nations Security Council Resolution 1971 =

UN Security Council Resolution 1971
- Location of Sierra Leone
- Date: 3 March 2011
- Meeting no.: 6,493
- Code: S/RES/1971 (Document)
- Subject: United Nations Mission in Liberia
- Voting summary: 15 voted for; None voted against; None abstained
- Result: Adopted

Security Council composition
- Permanent members: China; France; Russia; United Kingdom; United States
- Non-permanent members: Bosnia–Herzegovina; Brazil; Colombia; Germany; Gabon; India; Lebanon; Nigeria; Portugal; South Africa

United Nations Security Council Resolution 1971, adopted unanimously on March 3, 2011, after recalling previous resolutions on the situation in Liberia and Sierra Leone, including Resolution 1626 (2005), the Council requested the United Nations Mission in Liberia (UNMIL) to withdraw its military personnel providing security for the Special Court for Sierra Leone, and placed the responsibility for security with the Sierra Leone Police.

== Resolution ==
=== Observations ===
Resolution 1626 had authorised an UNMIL contingent to protect the Special Court. The Security Council praised the role of UNMIL, particularly the Mongolian contingent of the mission. It noted that the Registrar of the Special Court had stated that there would be no need for a military guard after February 2011, while the Sierra Leone government had requested that a withdrawal be postponed until late February or early March 2011.

=== Acts ===
Acting under Chapter VII of the United Nations Charter, the Council ended the authorisation given to 150 UNMIL personnel to protect the Special Court and asked it to withdraw by 7 March 2011. UNMIL could also no longer evacuate officials of the Special Court in the event of an emergency. The Council awaited security to be provided by local security, while the United Nations Integrated Peacebuilding Office in Sierra Leone (UNIPSIL) was instructed to include officials of the Special Court within its evacuation procedures.

== See also ==
- List of United Nations Security Council Resolutions 1901 to 2000 (2009–2011)
- Second Liberian Civil War
- Sierra Leone Civil War
