= United Nations Security Council Resolution 1914 =

UN Security Council Resolution 1914
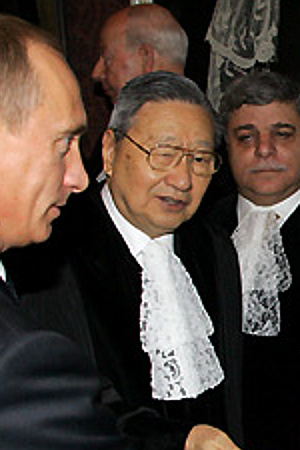
- Shi Jiuyong in 2005
- Date: 18 March 2010
- Meeting no.: 6,285
- Code: S/RES/1914 (Document)
- Subject: International Court of Justice
- Voting summary: 15 voted for; None voted against; None abstained
- Result: Adopted

Security Council composition
- Permanent members: China; France; Russia; United Kingdom; United States
- Non-permanent members: Austria; Bosnia–Herzegovina; Brazil; Gabon; Japan; Lebanon; Mexico; Nigeria; Turkey; Uganda

United Nations Security Council Resolution 1914, adopted unanimously on 18 March 2010, after noting the resignation of International Court of Justice (ICJ) judge Shi Jiuyong and that the vacancy must be filled in accordance with the Statute of the ICJ, the Council decided that the election to fill the vacancy would take place on 29 June 2010 at a meeting of the Security Council and at a meeting of the General Assembly at its 64th session.

Shi had served at the ICJ since February 1994. He was re-elected in 2003, and served as Vice-President of the Court from 2000 to 2003 and as its president from 2003 until 2006.

== See also ==
- Judges of the International Court of Justice
- List of United Nations Security Council Resolutions 1901 to 2000 (2009–2011)
