= List of United Nations Security Council Resolutions 1901 to 2000 =

This is a list of United Nations Security Council Resolutions 1901 to 2000 adopted between 16 December 2009 and 27 July 2011.

| Resolution | Date | Vote | Concerns |
|---|---|---|---|
| 1901 | 16 December 2009 | 15–0–0 | Terms of judges at the International Criminal Tribunal for Rwanda |
| 1902 | 17 December 2009 | 15–0–0 | Extends mandate of the United Nations Integrated Office in Burundi |
| 1903 | 17 December 2009 | 15–0–0 | Lifts arms embargo on Liberia, renewal of travel bans on certain officials; extends mandate of expert panel |
| 1904 | 17 December 2009 | 15–0–0 | Regime of sanctions against Al-Qaeda, the Taliban and associated groups |
| 1905 | 21 December 2009 | 15–0–0 | Extends arrangements relating to the Development Fund for Iraq |
| 1906 | 23 December 2009 | 15–0–0 | Extends mandate of the United Nations Mission in the Democratic Republic of Congo |
| 1907 | 23 December 2009 | 13–1–1 (against: Libya; abstention: China) | Sanctions Eritrea over its role in Somalia and its refusal to withdraw troops from border with Djibouti |
| 1908 | 19 January 2010 | 15–0–0 | Increases size of the United Nations Stabilization Mission in Haiti in the aftermath of the Haiti earthquake |
| 1909 | 21 January 2010 | 15–0–0 | Extends mandate of the United Nations Mission in Nepal and plans for its withdrawal |
| 1910 | 28 January 2010 | 15–0–0 | Extends mandate of the African Union Mission to Somalia |
| 1911 | 28 January 2010 | 15–0–0 | Extends mandate of the United Nations Operation in Côte d'Ivoire in run up to the presidential elections |
| 1912 | 26 February 2010 | 15–0–0 | Extends mandate of the United Nations Integrated Mission in East Timor; reconfiguration of police component |
| 1913 | 12 March 2010 | 15–0–0 | Extends mandate of the United Nations Mission in the Central African Republic and Chad |
| 1914 | 18 March 2010 | 15–0–0 | Vacancy and election at the International Court of Justice |
| 1915 | 18 March 2010 | 15–0–0 | Temporary increase in the number of judges at the International Criminal Tribunal for the former Yugoslavia |
| 1916 | 19 March 2010 | 15–0–0 | Extends and expands the mandate of the Monitoring Group on Somalia to include provisions against Eritrea |
| 1917 | 22 March 2010 | 15–0–0 | Extends mandate of the United Nations Assistance Mission in Afghanistan; recovery efforts |
| 1918 | 27 April 2010 | 15–0–0 | Calls on all states to criminalise piracy under national laws |
| 1919 | 29 April 2010 | 15–0–0 | Extends mandate of the United Nations Mission in Sudan |
| 1920 | 30 April 2010 | 15–0–0 | Extends mandate of the United Nations Mission for the Referendum in Western Sahara |
| 1921 | 12 May 2010 | 15–0–0 | Extends mandate of the United Nations Mission in Nepal; preparations for withdrawal |
| 1922 | 12 May 2010 | 15–0–0 | Extends mandate of the United Nations Mission in the Central African Republic and Chad |
| 1923 | 25 May 2010 | 15–0–0 | Withdrawal of the United Nations Mission in the Central African Republic and Chad |
| 1924 | 27 May 2010 | 15–0–0 | Extends mandate of the United Nations Operation in Côte d'Ivoire |
| 1925 | 28 May 2010 | 15–0–0 | Extends mandate of the United Nations Mission in the Democratic Republic of Congo; reduces size; renames force |
| 1926 | 2 June 2010 | 15–0–0 | Vacancy and election at the International Court of Justice |
| 1927 | 4 June 2010 | 15–0–0 | Deploys additional police as part of the United Nations Stabilization Mission in Haiti |
| 1928 | 7 June 2010 | 15–0–0 | Extends mandate of expert panel monitoring Sanctions against North Korea |
| 1929 | 9 June 2010 | 12–2–1 (against: Brazil, Turkey; abstention: Lebanon) | Sanctions Iran over its nuclear program |
| 1930 | 15 June 2010 | 14–1–0 (against: Turkey) | Extends mandate of the United Nations Peacekeeping Force in Cyprus |
| 1931 | 29 June 2010 | 15–0–0 | Extends terms of judges at the International Criminal Tribunal for the former Yugoslavia |
| 1932 | 29 June 2010 | 15–0–0 | Extends terms of judges at the International Criminal Tribunal for Rwanda |
| 1933 | 30 June 2010 | 15–0–0 | Extends and expands mandate of the United Nations Operation in Côte d'Ivoire and supporting French forces |
| 1934 | 30 June 2010 | 15–0–0 | Extends mandate of the United Nations Disengagement Observer Force |
| 1935 | 30 July 2010 | 15–0–0 | Extends mandate of the African Union – United Nations Hybrid Operation in Darfur |
| 1936 | 5 August 2010 | 15–0–0 | Extends mandate of the United Nations Assistance Mission in Iraq |
| 1937 | 30 August 2010 | 15–0–0 | Extends mandate of the United Nations Interim Force in Lebanon |
| 1938 | 15 September 2010 | 15–0–0 | Extends mandate of the United Nations Mission in Liberia |
| 1939 | 15 September 2010 | 15–0–0 | Extends mandate of the United Nations Mission in Nepal for final time |
| 1940 | 29 September 2010 | 15–0–0 | Lifts arms embargo and remaining sanctions against Sierra Leone |
| 1941 | 29 September 2010 | 15–0–0 | Extends mandate of the United Nations Integrated Peacebuilding Office in Sierra Leone |
| 1942 | 29 September 2010 | 15–0–0 | Authorises temporary increase of United Nations Operation in Côte d'Ivoire military and police personnel contingents |
| 1943 | 13 October 2010 | 15–0–0 | Extends authorisation of the International Security Assistance Force in Afghanistan |
| 1944 | 14 October 2010 | 15–0–0 | Extends mandate of the United Nations Stabilization Mission in Haiti |
| 1945 | 14 October 2010 | 14–0–1 (abstention: China) | Extends mandate of expert panel monitoring sanctions against groups in Darfur, Sudan |
| 1946 | 15 October 2010 | 15–0–0 | Extends mandate of expert panel and sanctions against Côte d'Ivoire |
| 1947 | 29 October 2010 | 15–0–0 | Reaffirms role of the United Nations Peacebuilding Commission |
| 1948 | 18 November 2010 | 15–0–0 | Extends mandate of EUFOR Althea in Bosnia and Herzegovina |
| 1949 | 23 November 2010 | 15–0–0 | Extends mandate of the United Nations Integrated Peacebuilding Office in Guinea-Bissau |
| 1950 | 23 November 2010 | 15–0–0 | Re-authorises states to intervene in acts of piracy off the coast of Somalia |
| 1951 | 24 November 2010 | 15–0–0 | Temporary re-deployment of units from the United Nations Mission in Liberia to the United Nations Operation in Côte d'Ivoire |
| 1952 | 29 November 2010 | 15–0–0 | Extends arms embargo and other sanctions against the Democratic Republic of the Congo |
| 1953 | 14 December 2010 | 14–1–0 (against: Turkey) | Extends mandate of the United Nations Peacekeeping Force in Cyprus |
| 1954 | 14 December 2010 | 15–0–0 | Extends terms of judges at the International Criminal Tribunal for the former Yugoslavia |
| 1955 | 14 December 2010 | 15–0–0 | Extends terms of judges at the International Criminal Tribunal for Rwanda; temporary increase in ad litem judges |
| 1956 | 15 December 2010 | 15–0–0 | Terminates arrangements for the Development Fund for Iraq; successor arrangements from oil and gas exports |
| 1957 | 15 December 2010 | 15–0–0 | Ends restrictions relating to weapons of mass destruction and civilian nuclear activities against Iraq |
| 1958 | 15 December 2010 | 14–0–1 (abstention: France) | Terminates residual activities of the Iraqi Oil-for-Food Programme |
| 1959 | 16 December 2010 | 15–0–0 | Establishes the United Nations Office in Burundi |
| 1960 | 16 December 2010 | 15–0–0 | Requests information on parties suspected of engaging in sexual abuse in armed conflict to be made available |
| 1961 | 17 December 2010 | 15–0–0 | Renews arms embargo and travel sanctions regarding Liberia |
| 1962 | 20 December 2010 | 15–0–0 | Extends mandate of United Nations Operation in Côte d'Ivoire; demands respect for election results |
| 1963 | 20 December 2010 | 15–0–0 | Continues Counter-Terrorism Committee Executive Directorate under guidance of the Counter-Terrorism Committee |
| 1964 | 22 December 2010 | 15–0–0 | Extends authorisation of African Union Mission to Somalia; increases size of force |
| 1965 | 22 December 2010 | 15–0–0 | Extends mandate of the United Nations Disengagement Observer Force |
| 1966 | 22 December 2010 | 14–0–1 (abstention: Russia) | Establishes residual mechanism to conclude remaining tasks of the International Criminal Tribunals for Rwanda and former Yugoslavia |
| 1967 | 19 January 2011 | 15–0–0 | Authorises increase in strength of the United Nations Operation in Côte d'Ivoire |
| 1968 | 16 February 2011 | 15–0–0 | Extends redeployment of troops from the United Nations Mission in Liberia to the United Nations Operation in Côte d'Ivoire |
| 1969 | 24 February 2011 | 15–0–0 | Extends mandate of the United Nations Integrated Mission in East Timor |
| 1970 | 26 February 2011 | 15–0–0 | Imposes sanctions on Muammar Gaddafi's Libyan regime for its attempts to put down an uprising |
| 1971 | 3 March 2011 | 15–0–0 | Withdraws United Nations Mission in Liberia contingent from protecting the Special Court for Sierra Leone |
| 1972 | 17 March 2011 | 15–0–0 | Temporarily exempts work of humanitarian organisations in Somalia from financial sanctions |
| 1973 | 17 March 2011 | 10–0–5 (abstentions: China, Russia, Brazil, Germany, India) | Authorises the use of a no-fly-zone over Libya, with the explicit task of protecting the civilian population |
| 1974 | 22 March 2011 | 15–0–0 | Extends mandate of the United Nations Assistance Mission in Afghanistan |
| 1975 | 30 March 2011 | 15–0–0 | Imposes sanctions on Laurent Gbagbo's Ivorian regime for refusing to hand over power |
| 1976 | 11 April 2011 | 15–0–0 | Decides to consider special courts to deal with piracy off the coast of Somalia |
| 1977 | 20 April 2011 | 15–0–0 | Extends mandate of 1540 Committee concerning non-proliferation of weapons of mass destruction |
| 1978 | 27 April 2011 | 15–0–0 | Extends mandate of the United Nations Mission in Sudan |
| 1979 | 27 April 2011 | 15–0–0 | Extends mandate of the United Nations Mission for the Referendum in Western Sahara |
| 1980 | 28 April 2011 | 15–0–0 | Renews arms embargo, diamond trade ban against Côte d'Ivoire |
| 1981 | 13 May 2011 | 15–0–0 | Extends mandate of the United Nations Operation in Côte d'Ivoire and temporary redeployment from Liberia |
| 1982 | 17 May 2011 | 15–0–0 | Extends mandate of expert panel monitoring arms embargo and other sanctions against Sudan |
| 1983 | 7 June 2011 | 15–0–0 | Inclusion of HIV/AIDS prevention, treatment, care and support in peacekeeping missions |
| 1984 | 9 June 2011 | 14–0–1 (abstention: Lebanon) | Extends mandate of expert panel monitoring sanctions against Iran |
| 1985 | 10 June 2011 | 15–0–0 | Extends mandate of expert panel monitoring sanctions against North Korea |
| 1986 | 13 June 2011 | 15–0–0 | Extends mandate of the United Nations Peacekeeping Force in Cyprus |
| 1987 | 17 June 2011 | Adopted by acclamation | Recommends Ban Ki-moon for second term as Secretary-General of the United Nations |
| 1988 | 17 June 2011 | 15–0–0 | Splits the functions of the Al-Qaida and Taliban Sanctions Committee; sanctions relating to the Taliban |
| 1989 | 17 June 2011 | 15–0–0 | Splits the functions of the Al-Qaida and Taliban Sanctions Committee; sanctions relating to Al-Qaeda |
| 1990 | 27 June 2011 | 15–0–0 | Establishes the United Nations Interim Security Force for Abyei in the border area between Sudan and South Sudan |
| 1991 | 28 June 2011 | 15–0–0 | Prolongs the United Nations Organization Stabilization Mission in the Democratic Republic of the Congo |
| 1992 | 29 June 2011 | 15–0–0 | Extends deployment of helicopters from the United Nations Mission in Liberia to the United Nations Operation in Côte d'Ivoire |
| 1993 | 29 June 2011 | 15–0–0 | Extends terms of offices for judges at the International Criminal Tribunal for the former Yugoslavia |
| 1994 | 30 June 2011 | 15–0–0 | Extends the mandate of the United Nations Disengagement Observer Force |
| 1995 | 6 July 2011 | 15–0–0 | Allows temporary judges at the International Criminal Tribunal for Rwanda to vote and stand as candidates for the presidency |
| 1996 | 8 July 2011 | 15–0–0 | Establishes the United Nations Mission in the Republic of South Sudan |
| 1997 | 11 July 2011 | 15–0–0 | Authorises closure of the United Nations Mission in Sudan |
| 1998 | 12 July 2011 | 15–0–0 | Condemns attacks against schools and hospitals in armed conflict |
| 1999 | 13 July 2011 | Adopted without vote | Recommends the admission of South Sudan to the United Nations |
| 2000 | 27 July 2011 | 15–0–0 | Extends mandate of the United Nations Operation in Côte d'Ivoire |

== See also ==
- Lists of United Nations Security Council resolutions
- List of United Nations Security Council Resolutions 1801 to 1900
- List of United Nations Security Council Resolutions 2001 to 2100
