= United Nations Security Council Resolution 1965 =

UN Security Council Resolution 1965
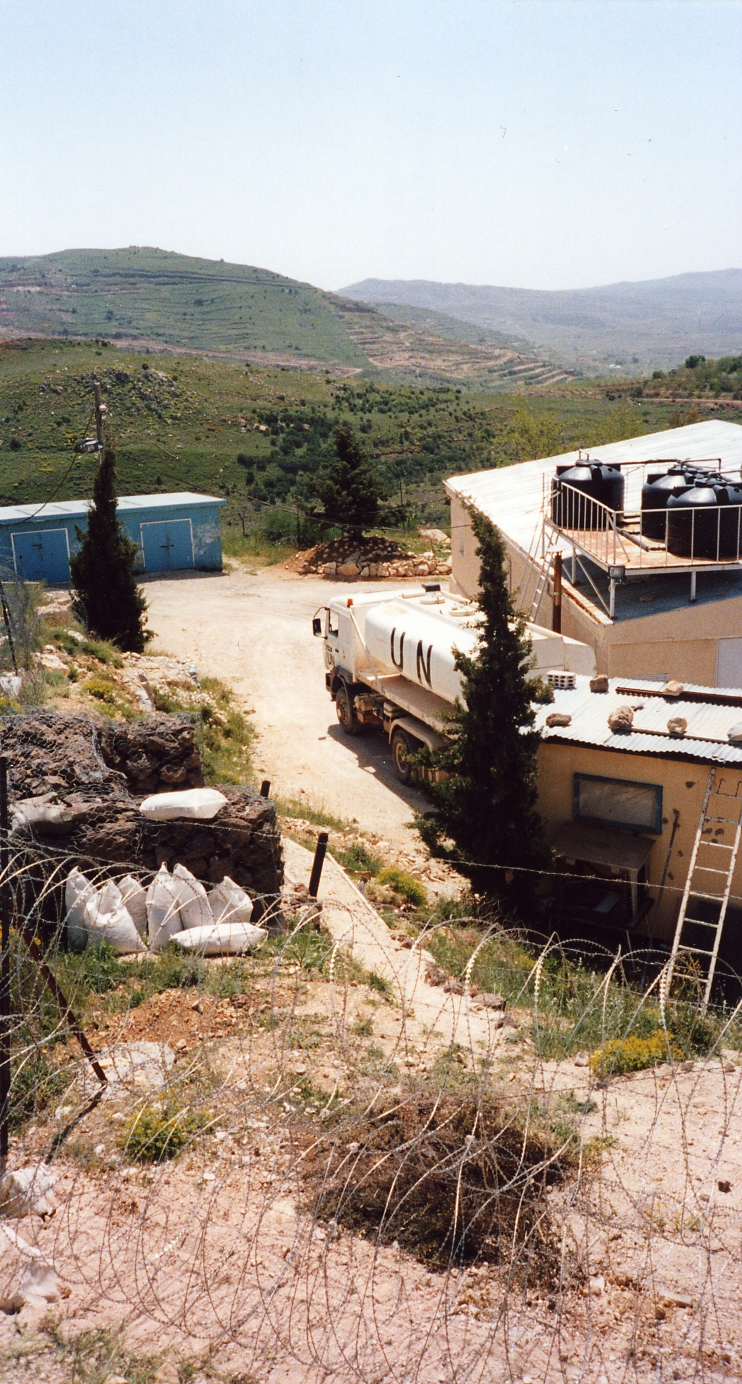
- UNDOF camp in the Golan Heights
- Date: 22 December 2010
- Meeting no.: 6,462
- Code: S/RES/1965 (Document)
- Subject: The situation in the Middle East
- Voting summary: 15 voted for; None voted against; None abstained
- Result: Adopted

Security Council composition
- Permanent members: China; France; Russia; United Kingdom; United States
- Non-permanent members: Austria; Bosnia–Herzegovina; Brazil; Gabon; Japan; Lebanon; Mexico; Nigeria; Turkey; Uganda

United Nations Security Council Resolution 1965, adopted unanimously on December 22, 2010, after considering a report by the Secretary-General Ban Ki-moon regarding the United Nations Disengagement Observer Force (UNDOF), the Council extended its mandate for a further six months until June 30, 2011.

The Security Council called for the implementation of Resolution 338 (1973) which demanded negotiations take place between the parties for a peaceful settlement of the situation in the Middle East. It welcomed UNDOF's efforts to implement the Secretary-General's zero-tolerance policy on sexual exploitation and abuse.

Finally, the Secretary-General was requested to report before the end of UNDOF's mandate on measures to implement Resolution 338 and developments in the situation. UNDOF was established in 1974 by Resolution 350 to monitor the ceasefire between Israel and Syria. The report of the Secretary-General pursuant to the previous resolution on UNDOF indicated that the situation in the Middle East remained tense until a settlement could be reached, with the Secretary-General encouraging peace talks to resume which were broke off in December 2008.

== See also ==
- Arab–Israeli conflict
- Golan Heights
- Israel–Syria relations
- List of United Nations Security Council Resolutions 1901 to 2000 (2009–2011)
