= United Nations Security Council Resolution 1905 =

UN Security Council Resolution 1905
- Location of Iraq
- Date: 21 December 2009
- Meeting no.: 6,249
- Code: S/RES/1905 (Document)
- Subject: The situation concerning Iraq
- Voting summary: 15 voted for; None voted against; None abstained
- Result: Adopted

Security Council composition
- Permanent members: China; France; Russia; United Kingdom; United States
- Non-permanent members: Austria; Burkina Faso; Costa Rica; Croatia; Japan; Libya; Mexico; Turkey; Uganda; Vietnam

United Nations Security Council Resolution 1905, adopted unanimously on December 21, 2009, after noting the letter from Prime Minister of Iraq Nouri al-Maliki, the Council extended until 31 December 2010 the arrangements for depositing proceeds from oil and gas export sales into the Development Fund for Iraq, established under Resolution 1483 (2003).

The Council, acting under Chapter VII of the United Nations Charter, decided to review relevant parts of Resolution 1483 (2003) relating to the Development Fund mechanism and International Advisory and Monitoring Board at the request of the Iraqi Government by 15 June 2010, and called on the Government of Iraq, through the Council of Financial Experts, to report on the progress being made while ensuring the timely and effective transition to a post-Development Fund mechanism by 31 December 2010.

== See also ==
- Iraq War
- List of United Nations Security Council Resolutions 1901 to 2000 (2009–2011)
