= United Nations Security Council Resolution 1925 =

UN Security Council Resolution 1925
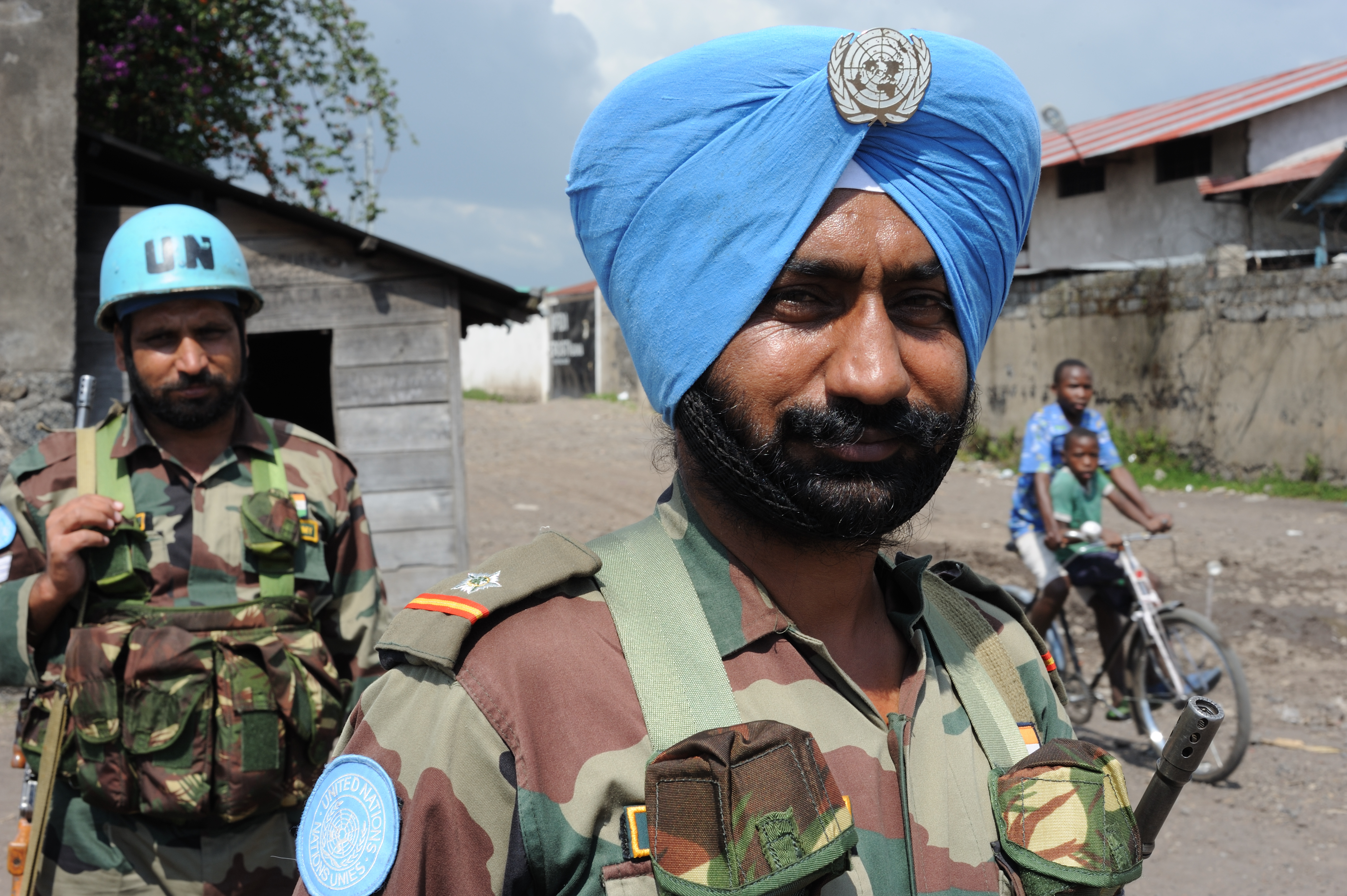
- MONUC peacekeepers
- Date: 28 May 2010
- Meeting no.: 6,324
- Code: S/RES/1925 (Document)
- Subject: The situation in the Democratic Republic of the Congo
- Voting summary: 15 voted for; None voted against; None abstained
- Result: Adopted

Security Council composition
- Permanent members: China; France; Russia; United Kingdom; United States
- Non-permanent members: Austria; Bosnia–Herzegovina; Brazil; Gabon; Japan; Lebanon; Mexico; Nigeria; Turkey; Uganda

United Nations Security Council Resolution 1925, adopted unanimously on May 28, 2010, after reaffirming previous resolutions on the situation in the Democratic Republic of the Congo, the Council extended the mandate of the United Nations Mission in the Democratic Republic of Congo (MONUC) until June 30, 2010, authorised a withdrawal of 2,000 troops and decided that from July 1, 2010, MONUC would be known as the United Nations Organization Stabilization Mission in the Democratic Republic of the Congo (MONUSCO) with a mandate until June 30, 2011.

The President of the Democratic Republic of the Congo, Joseph Kabila, had asked for the force to leave the country by 2011 but human rights groups warned that a sudden withdrawal would cause more conflict and instability.

== Resolution ==
=== Observations ===
In the preamble of Resolution 1925, the Council noted the progress made in the Democratic Republic of the Congo over the past 15 years and stressed the responsibility of the Government of the Democratic Republic of the Congo of the respect for human rights, rule of law and international humanitarian law, and the disarmament, demobilisation and reintegration of Congolese and foreign troops. There were significant security problems in the east of the country, particularly in the Kivus and Orientale regions. Addressing the situation in the Great Lakes region as a whole, the Council emphasised the illicit trade of natural resources and arms trafficking as major factors contributing to the conflicts in the region, and greater regional efforts were needed to tackle the issue, including legal action against the Democratic Forces for the Liberation of Rwanda (FDLR).

The Council supported the efforts of the government to finalise plans for local, general and presidential elections. There was concern about the effects of armed conflicts on the civilian population, including targeted attacks, widespread sexual violence and use of child soldiers. It condemned attacks on United Nations peacekeepers and humanitarian personnel, and welcomed commitments made by the Democratic Republic of the Congo government to bring those responsible to justice.

=== Acts ===
The text of the resolution was enacted under Chapter VII of the United Nations Charter, thus making its provisions legally enforceable.

The Security Council extended MONUC's mandate and renamed it to MONUSCO from July 2010. It decided that MONUSCO would comprise a maximum of 19,815 military troops, 760 military observers, 391 police and 1,050 personnel of formed police units. A withdrawal of 2,000 troops from areas where the situation permitted it do so was authorised; the withdrawal was smaller than what the Congolese government had asked for. The force would be concentrated primarily in the east of the country with three main objectives:

(a) completing military operations in the Kivus and Orientale provinces;
(b) establishing security forces to take on MONUSCO's role and improve the capacity of Government of the Democratic Republic of the Congo to protect civilians;
(c) consolidating state authority throughout the territory.

MONUSCO's mandate emphasised the protection of civilians, United Nations and humanitarian personnel in addition to completing operations against the FDLR, Lord's Resistance Army (LRA) and other groups. It also included reform of the Congolese police, military, legal and judicial systems, preparations for elections and demining activities. MONUSCO was requested to collect information on violations of human rights and international humanitarian law and ensure regular contact with the civilian population on its activities and mandate. The Council also demanded that the FDLR and LRA immediately end violence against the population, including rape and sexual abuse.

The resolution concluded by requesting three reports from the Secretary-General Ban Ki-moon on October 11, 2010 and January 21 and May 13, 2011 concerning developments on the ground.

== See also ==
- Dongo conflict
- Ituri conflict
- Kivu conflict
- List of United Nations Security Council Resolutions 1901 to 2000 (2009–2011)
