= United Nations Security Council Resolution 1953 =

UN Security Council Resolution 1953
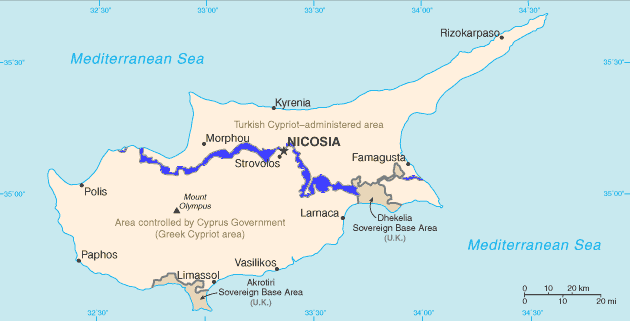
- Buffer zone dividing Cyprus
- Date: 14 December 2010
- Meeting no.: 6,445
- Code: S/RES/1953 (Document)
- Subject: The situation in Cyprus
- Voting summary: 14 voted for; 1 voted against; None abstained
- Result: Adopted

Security Council composition
- Permanent members: China; France; Russia; United Kingdom; United States
- Non-permanent members: Austria; Bosnia–Herzegovina; Brazil; Gabon; Japan; Lebanon; Mexico; Nigeria; Turkey; Uganda

United Nations Security Council Resolution 1953, adopted on December 14, 2010, after reaffirming all resolutions on the situation in Cyprus, particularly Resolution 1251 (1999), the Council extended the mandate of the United Nations Peacekeeping Force in Cyprus (UNFICYP) for a further six months until June 15, 2011, calling for Greek and Turkish Cypriot leaders to develop a plan for overcoming differences before the Secretary-General visit in January 2011.

The resolution was adopted by 14 votes to one against from Turkey and no abstentions. The Turkish representative said that the island did not have a single government since 1963, though it would continue to implement the resolution.

== Resolution ==
=== Observations ===
The Security Council noted that the Cypriot government had agreed to the continued presence of UNFICYP on the island. A solution to the conflict was down to the Cypriots themselves, and there was a unique opportunity to achieve a lasting settlement. There was progress in the peace talks though the Council remained concerned that progress was slow. It welcomed the implementation of confidence-building measures by both Cyprus and Northern Cyprus and encouraged further crossing points to be opened along the Green Line. The Limnitis crossing opened in October 2010 which was further welcomed.

The Council remained convinced that a durable settlement of the Cyprus dispute would be beneficial for all Cypriots and the situation in the buffer zone would improve if both sides accepted the 1989 aide-mémoire used by the United Nations. It was convinced that undermining the credibility of the United Nations was detrimental to the peace process. Furthermore, the Council welcomed progress in demining activities, the efforts of the Committee on Missing Persons, and agreed that the active participation of civil society groups and bi-communal contacts was essential to the political process.

=== Acts ===
The resolution welcomed the progress of negotiations and the prospect of progress in the near future towards a settlement. In this regard, it called on the two Cypriot leaders to intensify negotiations, improve their atmosphere, and increase the participation of civil society. Furthermore, both sides were called upon to participate in consultations on the demarcation of the buffer zone and the 1989 aide-mémoire.

The Turkish Cypriot side was urged to restore the military status quo in Strovilia that existed there before June 30, 2000. Finally, the Secretary-General Ban Ki-moon was requested to submit a report by June 1, 2011 on the implementation of the current resolution.

== See also ==
- Cyprus dispute
- List of United Nations Security Council Resolutions 1901 to 2000 (2009–2011)
- United Nations Buffer Zone in Cyprus
- Turkish invasion of Cyprus
