= United Nations Security Council Resolution 1952 =

UN Security Council Resolution 1952
- A Congolese light infantry battalion in Kisangani
- Date: 29 November 2010
- Meeting no.: 6,432
- Code: S/RES/1952 (Document)
- Subject: The situation in the Democratic Republic of the Congo
- Voting summary: 15 voted for; None voted against; None abstained
- Result: Adopted

Security Council composition
- Permanent members: China; France; Russia; United Kingdom; United States
- Non-permanent members: Austria; Bosnia–Herzegovina; Brazil; Gabon; Japan; Lebanon; Mexico; Nigeria; Turkey; Uganda

United Nations Security Council Resolution 1952, adopted unanimously on November 29, 2010, after recalling previous resolutions on the situation in the Democratic Republic of the Congo, including resolutions 1807 (2008), 1857 (2008) and 1896 (2009), the Council renewed an arms embargo and related targeted sanctions for a further period until November 30, 2011.

The resolution was drafted by France.

== Observations ==
In the preamble of the resolution, the Council welcomed co-operation between the expert group established to monitor the implementation of the arms embargo and regional governments including the government of the Democratic Republic of the Congo. It remained concerned at the destabilizing presence of armed groups in the east of the country. The Council demanded that armed groups including the Democratic Forces for the Liberation of Rwanda (FDLR) and Lord's Resistance Army (LRA) lay down their arms, expressing concern that such armed groups were receiving support from international networks.

The Council condemned the illegal flow of weapons into and within the Democratic Republic of the Congo in violation of resolutions 1533 (2004), 1807, 1857 and 1896 and intended to closely monitor their implementation. It recognized that the illegal exploitation of natural resources in the country was fueling conflicts in the Great Lakes region. Furthermore, human rights violations, killings, the use of child soldiers and sexual violence remained a major concern.

== Acts ==
Acting under Chapter VII of the United Nations Charter, the Council extended the arms embargo concerning the Democratic Republic of the Congo for a year, along with travel, financial and transport sanctions, further calling on all states to implement the restrictions. Meanwhile, the Secretary-General Ban Ki-moon was requested to extend the mandate of the group of experts, with the addition of a sixth expert to look at the issue of natural resources, for a year. The group was asked to focus on areas affected by armed groups and the networks that supported them, criminal networks and human rights violations. The Security Council also asked Member States to promote awareness and implementation of a set of guidelines recommended by the expert group regarding the exercise of due diligence by the importers, processing industries and consumers of mineral products from the DRC, so as to exclude armed groups from minerals supply chains.

The resolution also asked countries in the region to ensure that no support reached the armed groups in eastern Democratic Republic of the Congo. The country itself was asked to take action against criminal networks and to address prevailing impunity. Finally, all countries were instructed to cooperate with the investigations of the expert group and to regularly publish statistics regarding the import and export of Congolese resources.

== See also ==
- Dongo conflict
- Ituri conflict
- Kivu conflict
- List of United Nations Security Council Resolutions 1901 to 2000 (2009–2011)
- United Nations Mission in the Democratic Republic of Congo
