= United Nations Security Council Resolution 1945 =

UN Security Council Resolution 1945
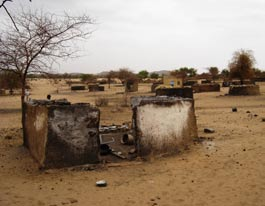
- Burnt out hut in Darfur
- Date: 14 October 2010
- Meeting no.: 6,401
- Code: S/RES/1945 (Document)
- Subject: The situation in Sudan
- Voting summary: 14 voted for; None voted against; 1 abstained
- Result: Adopted

Security Council composition
- Permanent members: China; France; Russia; United Kingdom; United States
- Non-permanent members: Austria; Bosnia–Herzegovina; Brazil; Gabon; Japan; Lebanon; Mexico; Nigeria; Turkey; Uganda

United Nations Security Council Resolution 1945, adopted on October 14, 2010, after recalling previous resolutions on the situation in Sudan, the Council extended the mandate of an expert panel monitoring an arms embargo and other sanctions on groups that "impede peace in Sudan" until October 19, 2011.

The resolution was approved by 14 votes to none against and one abstention from China, which expressed doubts about the objectivity of the expert panel and its latest report.

== Resolution ==
=== Observations ===
The Security Council sought the full and timely implementation of the final phase of the Comprehensive Peace Agreement signed in 2005, including the attractiveness of unity and a referendum on their right to self-determination in Southern Sudan. It was committed towards a peaceful solution to the conflict in Darfur, and welcomed the restoration of Chad–Sudan relations in January 2010 with regard to accusations of support of rebel groups in each other's territory.

The preamble of the resolution also expressed concern about the increase in violence, including intertribal fighting, impunity, attacks on peacekeepers and sexual and gender-based violence. The Council demanded an end to military actions, including aerial bombardment, sexual violence against civilians and the use of child soldiers. It noted restrictions on the freedom of movement of the expert panel, and determined that the situation in the country remained a threat to international peace and security.

=== Acts ===
Acting under Chapter VII of the United Nations Charter, the Council extended the mandate of the expert panel monitoring the arms embargo was extended until October 19, 2011, which was originally established by Resolution 1591 (2005). It was asked to report on its work and co-ordinate activities with the African Union – United Nations Hybrid Operation in Darfur (UNAMID). All countries, United Nations agencies, the African Union and others were urged to co-operate with the expert panel by providing information when requested. Regional states in particular were required to report on steps they had taken to implement measures contained in resolutions 1556 (2004) and 1591.

The resolution also determined that all countries, including Sudan, had to notify the Committee established in Resolution 1591 before any assistance or supplies were provided into the Darfur region.

== See also ==
- African Union – United Nations Hybrid Operation in Darfur
- List of United Nations Security Council Resolutions 1901 to 2000 (2009–2011)
- United Nations Mission in Sudan
- War in Darfur
