= United Nations Security Council Resolution 1906 =

UN Security Council Resolution 1906
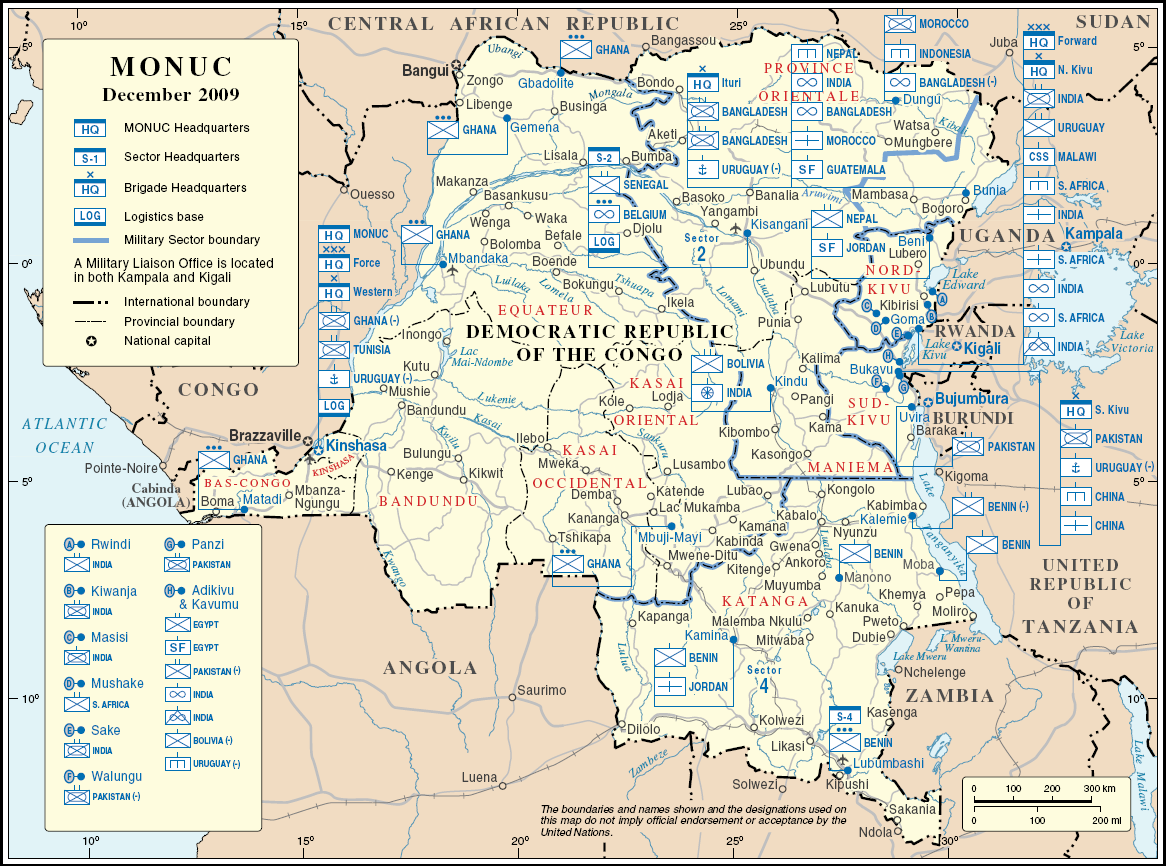
- MONUC deployments
- Date: 23 December 2009
- Meeting no.: 6,253
- Code: S/RES/1906 (Document)
- Subject: The situation in the Democratic Republic of the Congo
- Voting summary: 15 voted for; None voted against; None abstained
- Result: Adopted

Security Council composition
- Permanent members: China; France; Russia; United Kingdom; United States
- Non-permanent members: Austria; Burkina Faso; Costa Rica; Croatia; Japan; Libya; Mexico; Turkey; Uganda; Vietnam

United Nations Security Council Resolution 1906, adopted unanimously on December 23, 2009, after reaffirming previous resolutions on the topic and noting the situation in the Democratic Republic of the Congo (DR Congo), the Council decided to extend the mandate of the United Nations Mission in the Democratic Republic of Congo (MONUC) until 31 May 2010. The resolution therefore allowed 21,000 police and domestic and international troops to remain the country.

The resolution assigned the mission with three main tasks, to:

(a) ensure the effective protection of civilians, humanitarian and UN personnel and facilities;
(b) carry out disarmament, demobilisation and reintegration of foreign and Congolese troops;
(c) support government efforts to improve security and stability in the country.

The Council also reiterated its concern about continued violations of human rights in the conflict zones, urging the Congolese government "to effectively protect the civilian population, to develop sustainable security sector institutions which fully respect the rule of law and to ensure respect for human rights and the fight against impunity." It called upon the Lord's Resistance Army and Democratic Forces for the Liberation of Rwanda in particular to cease all forms of violence.

The Council requested the Secretary-General Ban Ki-moon to conduct a strategic review of the situation in the DR Congo and MONUC's progress towards achieving its mandate, taking into account the Integrated Strategic Framework for the United Nations presence in the country by 1 April 2010. With this in mind, the Council proposed to extend MONUC in the future, once it had found ways for it to better protect civilians.

== See also ==
- Dongo conflict
- Ituri conflict
- Kivu conflict
- List of United Nations Security Council Resolutions 1901 to 2000 (2009–2011)
