= United Nations Security Council Resolution 1674 =

UN Security Council Resolution 1674
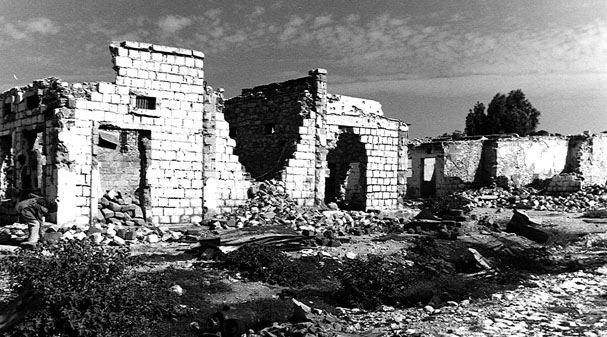
- War damage in Hargeisa, Somaliland
- Date: 28 April 2006
- Meeting no.: 5,430
- Code: S/RES/1674 (Document)
- Subject: Protection of civilians in armed conflict
- Voting summary: 15 voted for; None voted against; None abstained
- Result: Adopted

Security Council composition
- Permanent members: China; France; Russia; United Kingdom; United States
- Non-permanent members: Argentina; Rep. of the Congo; Denmark; Ghana; Greece; Japan; Peru; Qatar; Slovakia; Tanzania

United Nations Security Council Resolution 1674, adopted unanimously on April 28, 2006, after reaffirming resolutions 1265 (1999) and 1296 (2000) concerning the protection of civilians in armed conflict and Resolution 1631 (2005) on co-operation between the United Nations and regional organisations, the Council stressed a comprehensive approach to the prevention of armed conflict and its recurrence.

The resolution was adopted after six months of debate among Council members. It was the first time the Security Council had recognised a set of criteria to form a basis for humanitarian intervention in situations of armed conflict.

== Resolution ==
=== Observations ===
In the preamble of the resolution, the members of the Council reaffirmed their commitment to the United Nations Charter, acknowledging that peace, security, international development and human rights were the four interlinked pillars of the United Nations system. The Council regretted that civilians accounted for the majority of the victims during armed conflict, and was concerned about the impact of the illicit trade in natural resources and weapons on the population.

The text recognised the role of regional organisations in the protection of civilians, and the role of education in preventing abuses against civilians was emphasised. It reaffirmed that all parties to armed conflict had an obligation to protect the civilian population and to not harm the civilians.

=== Acts ===
The Security Council highlighted the importance of preventing armed conflict through a comprehensive approach involving economic growth, eradication of poverty, sustainable development, national reconciliation, good governance, democracy, the rule of law, and respect for human rights. The deliberate targeting of civilians during armed conflict was described as a "flagrant violation" of international humanitarian law. Additionally, provisions of the 2005 World Summit Outcome Document regarding the responsibility to protect populations from genocide, war crimes, ethnic cleansing and crimes against humanity were reaffirmed. Torture, sexual violence, violence against children, the recruitment of child soldiers, human trafficking, forced displacement and the denial of humanitarian aid were also condemned by the Council.

The resolution continued by demanding that all parties to armed conflict adhere to the Hague Conventions of 1899 and 1907 and the Geneva Conventions, including Protocols I and II. It reaffirmed that impunity should end and for all states to comply with their obligations in this respect, including—if they had not already done so—the ratification of international instruments relating to humanitarian, human rights and refugee law. Furthermore, all countries had to comply with the demands of the Security Council.

The Security Council called for special attention to be given to the protection of civilians during peace processes in post-conflict situations, including an end to attacks on civilians, the provision of humanitarian assistance, creating conditions for the return of refugees and internally displaced persons, facilitating access to education and training, re-establishing the rule of law and ending impunity. It was also important to maintain the civilian character of refugee camps and that United Nations peacekeeping missions had a clear mandate to protect civilians, as well as the inclusion of disarmament, demobilisation and reintegration programmes for ex-combatants.

In the latter paragraphs of the resolution, the members of the Council condemned all acts of sexual exploitation by police, military and civilian personnel working for the United Nations, and attacks on humanitarian workers. Meanwhile, it recognised the important role of regional and intergovernmental organisations in the protection of civilians. "Appropriate steps" would be adopted if the deliberate targeting of civilians and protected persons came to the attention of the Council.

Finally, the Secretary-General Kofi Annan was asked to report on the protection of civilians in armed conflict within 18 months.

== Adoption ==
Algeria, China and Russia had initially opposed the notion of collective responsibility, however Algeria's two-year term as a non-permanent member of the Security Council came to end on December 31, 2005 and diplomats later overcame objections from China and Russia.

== See also ==
- Laws of war
- List of United Nations Security Council Resolutions 1601 to 1700 (2005–2006)
- List of ongoing military conflicts
- Responsibility to protect
