= United Nations Security Council Resolution 1966 =

UN Security Council Resolution 1966
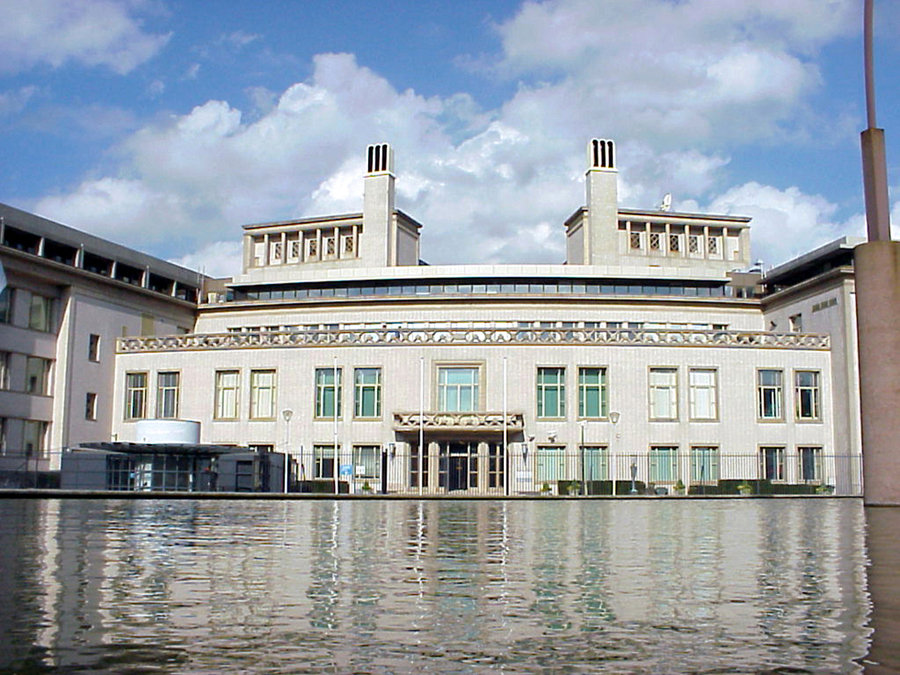
- Front view of the ICTY building (Photograph provided courtesy of the ICTY)
- Date: 22 December 2010
- Meeting no.: 6,463
- Code: S/RES/1966 (Document)
- Subject: International Tribunal for the former Yugoslavia
- Voting summary: 14 voted for; None voted against; 1 abstained
- Result: Adopted

Security Council composition
- Permanent members: China; France; Russia; United Kingdom; United States
- Non-permanent members: Austria; Bosnia–Herzegovina; Brazil; Gabon; Japan; Lebanon; Mexico; Nigeria; Turkey; Uganda

United Nations Security Council Resolution 1966, adopted on December 22, 2010, after recalling resolutions 827 (1993) and 955 (1994), the Council established a residual mechanism to conclude the remaining tasks of the International Criminal Tribunals for Rwanda (ICTR) and former Yugoslavia (ICTY). It was the final Security Council resolution adopted in 2010.

The resolution was adopted by 14 votes to none against and one abstention from Russia, which stated that the tribunals would be able to complete their work by the agreed dates, and for this to be the final resolution on the matter. It argued that the work of the tribunals would have to be completed by 2014.

== Resolution ==
=== Observations ===
The Security Council recalled resolutions 1503 (2003) and 1534 (2004) which called for the completion of all cases in both tribunals by 2010, and acknowledged that this completion date could not be met. At the same time, the Council noted that the tribunals had contributed towards justice, accountability and the rule of law in the former Yugoslavia and Rwanda. It reaffirmed that it was necessary to bring to justice all persons indicted by the ICTR and ICTY.

The preamble of the resolution indicated the need to establish a small and temporary ad hoc mechanism to carry out some functions of the tribunals after their closure, including the trial of fugitives.

=== Acts ===
Acting under Chapter VII of the United Nations Charter, the Council established the International Residual Mechanism for Criminal Tribunals with two commencement dates of July 1, 2012 and July 1, 2013 for the ICTR and ICTY respectively. A statute was also adopted for the mechanism, whose functions would gradually diminish over time. The tribunals were urged to complete all residual work by December 31, 2014 towards a transition to the mechanism. The Council urged the tribunals and the mechanism to make every effort to refer cases not involving those most responsible for crimes to competent national jurisdictions.

The Council further decided that the mechanism would continue the jurisdiction, rights, functions and obligations of the tribunals, and the Secretary-General Ban Ki-moon was requested to submit a draft rules of procedure and evidence for the mechanism by June 30, 2011. The mechanism was to operate for an initial period of four years from the first commencement date and progress would be reviewed regularly.

== See also ==
- Breakup of Yugoslavia
- List of indictees of the International Criminal Tribunal for the former Yugoslavia
- List of United Nations Security Council Resolutions 1901 to 2000 (2009–2011)
- Yugoslav Wars
