= United Nations Security Council Resolution 1887 =

UN Security Council Resolution 1887
- Nuclear-weapon-free zones Nuclear weapons states Nuclear sharing Neither, but NPT
- Date: 24 September 2009
- Meeting no.: 6,191
- Code: S/RES/1887 (Document)
- Subject: Maintenance of international peace and security Nuclear non-proliferation and nuclear disarmament
- Voting summary: 15 voted for; None voted against; None abstained
- Result: Adopted

Security Council composition
- Permanent members: China; France; Russia; United Kingdom; United States
- Non-permanent members: Austria; Burkina Faso; Costa Rica; Croatia; Japan; Libya; Mexico; Turkey; Uganda; Vietnam

United Nations Security Council Resolution 1887, adopted unanimously on 24 September 2009, the Council addressed non-proliferation and the prevention of the spread of weapons of mass destruction in the world.

== Details ==
With this resolution, the Council seeks "a safer world for all and to create the conditions for a world without nuclear weapons in accordance with the goals of the Treaty on the Non-Proliferation of Nuclear Weapons (NPT), in a way that promotes international stability, and based on the principle of undiminished security for all." It called on all countries to adhere to their obligations under the NPT, including co-operation with the International Atomic Energy Agency, and for nations to establish measures to reduce nuclear arms.

== Adoption ==
The Council unanimously adopted the resolution. Except for Libya, all members were represented by their heads of state or government. The meeting was presided by U.S. President Barack Obama.

=== Security Council permanent members ===
- China: President Hu Jintao voted in favour of the resolution as "to create a safer world for all, we must first and foremost remove the threat of nuclear war." However, he stressed "the right of all countries to the peaceful use of nuclear energy."
- France: President Nicolas Sarkozy laid the emphasis on the "violations" of previous resolutions by Iran and North Korea, which paid "absolutely no attention to what the international community [said]."
- Russia: President Dmitry Medvedev said that "our main shared goal [was] to untangle the problematic knots in the field of non-proliferation and disarmament." He added that "the issue of peaceful nuclear energy [required] serious attention."
- United Kingdom: Prime Minister Gordon Brown said that "with the unanimous agreement [...] under the leadership of President Obama, and with the great speeches that [had] been made around the table", the Council was "sending a united unequivocal and undivided message across the world" that "nuclear-weapon States and non-nuclear-weapon States" together committed to "creating the conditions for a world free from nuclear weapons."
- United States: President Barack Obama, presiding the meeting, stated that "the next 12 months [would] be absolutely critical in determining whether this resolution" and the "overall efforts to stop the spread and use of nuclear weapons" would be successful.

Furthermore, countries that had not signed the NPT were urged to do so.

=== Security Council elected members ===
- Austria: President Heinz Fischer said that Austria was "very satisfied" with the resolution, but pointed out that "resolutions [were] not enough" since "every State must accept responsibility and active participation."
- Burkina Faso: President Blaise Compaoré echoed the views of the rest of the Council, declaring that "the question of nuclear non-proliferation and disarmament [was] at the heart of the problems related to the maintenance of international peace and security."
- Croatia: President Stjepan Mesić advocated a reinforcement of "the role of the United Nations" and stated that "every country must be guaranteed its right to the peaceful use of nuclear energy."
- Costa Rica: President Óscar Arias Sánchez remarked that it did not "seem plausible to speak of a safer world so long as not even existing agreements [were] being honored".
- Japan: Prime Minister Yukio Hatoyama welcomed the resolution, recalling that "Japan [had] chosen to walk a non-nuclear path [...] to prevent the vicious cycle of a nuclear arms race" and because "as the only victim of nuclear bombing, it [had seen] moral responsibility in doing so".
- Libya: Permanent Representative Abdurrahman Mohamed Shalgham said that Libya wanted "the Middle East to be a nuclear-weapon-free zone" and defended the right of all States "to develop their capabilities to use nuclear energy and enrich nuclear fuel - but for peaceful purposes only."
- Mexico: President Felipe Calderón said that "Mexico [was] convinced that global peace and security [could not] be built on the accumulation of nuclear arsenals" and that the resolution "should be the first step of a new favour of disarmament."
- Turkey: Prime Minister Recep Tayyip Erdoğan highlighted that there was "a need for an incremental and sustained approach with respect to nuclear disarmament" and declared that Turkey believed that "States in full compliance with their safeguards obligations should enjoy unfettered access to civilian nuclear energy."
- Uganda: President Yoweri Kaguta Museveni echoed the sentiment of the Council and underlined that "Africa [was] interested not in nuclear weapons but in nuclear energy."
- Vietnam: President Nguyễn Minh Triết supported the consensus of the Council, emphasizing his country's commitment to non-proliferation.

== See also ==
- List of United Nations Security Council Resolutions 1801 to 1900 (2008–2009)
- Nuclear disarmament
