= United Nations Security Council Resolution 1894 =

UN Security Council Resolution 1894
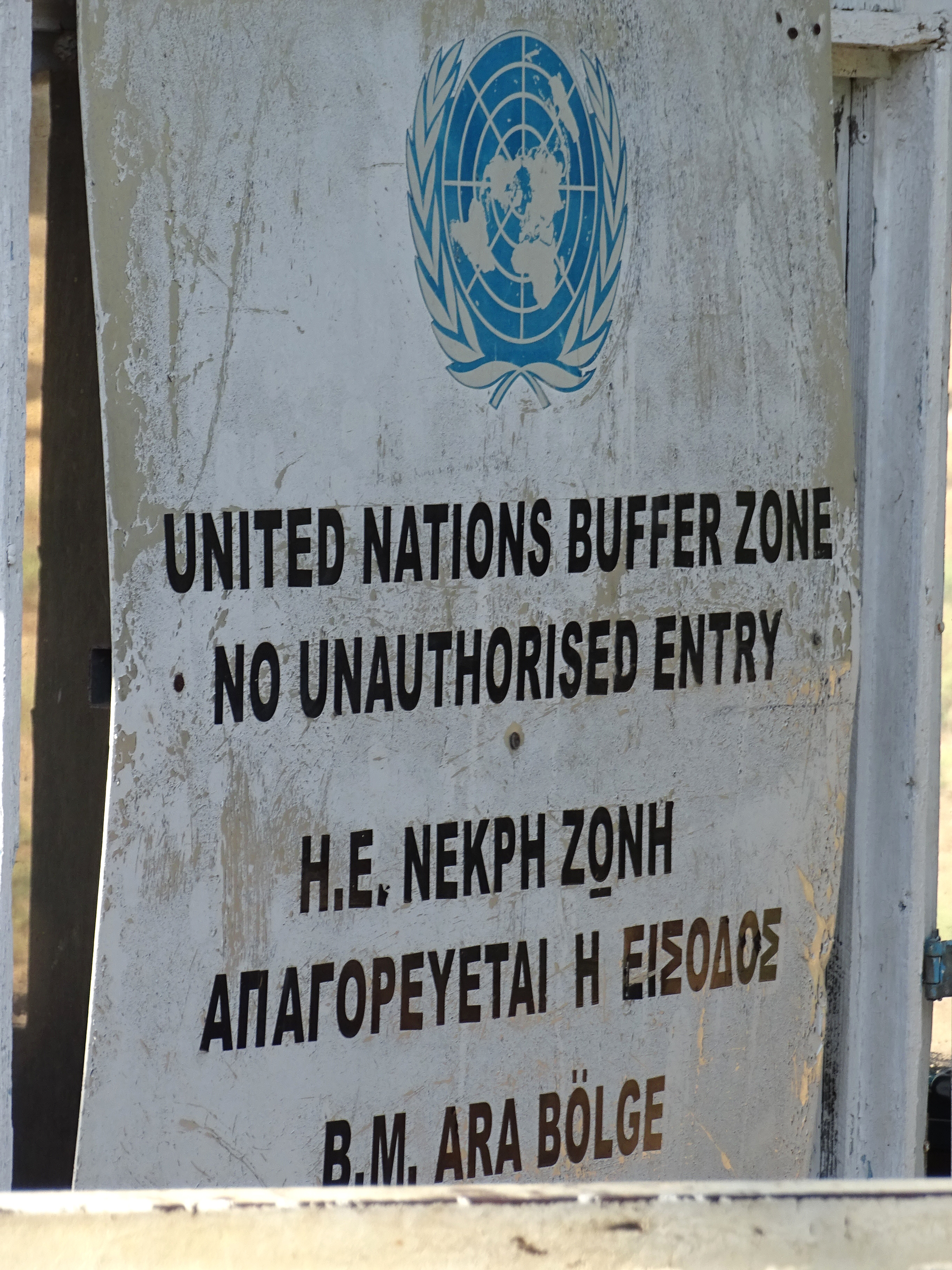
- Buffer zone in Nicosia
- Date: 11 November 2009
- Meeting no.: 6,216
- Code: S/RES/1894 (Document)
- Subject: Protection of civilians in armed conflict
- Voting summary: 15 voted for; None voted against; None abstained
- Result: Adopted

Security Council composition
- Permanent members: China; France; Russia; United Kingdom; United States
- Non-permanent members: Austria; Burkina Faso; Costa Rica; Croatia; Japan; Libya; Mexico; Turkey; Uganda; Vietnam

United Nations Security Council Resolution 1894 was unanimously adopted on 11 November 2009.

== Resolution ==
Expressing deep regret that civilians continued to account for the vast majority of casualties in armed conflicts, the Security Council reaffirmed today its readiness to respond to the targeting of civilians and the blocking of humanitarian aid, as it opened a day-long debate on the matter.

Unanimously adopting resolution 1894 (2009) –- and thereby marking the tenth anniversary of its systematic work on the protection of civilians in armed conflict – the Council demanded that parties to conflict comply strictly with international humanitarian, human rights and refugee law, as well as to Council resolutions calling for the protection of civilians and unimpeded access to humanitarian aid.

Noting that the deliberate targeting of civilians, in addition to systematic, flagrant and widespread violations of international law, might constitute a threat to international peace and security, the Council reaffirmed its readiness to consider appropriate measures against violators, in accordance with the United Nations Charter. It called on all parties to conflicts to strengthen the protection of civilians through heightened awareness at all levels, particularly through the training, orders and instructions issued to armed forces.

Also by the text, the Council recognized the need to consider the need for protection early in the formulation of peacekeeping mandates, as well as for comprehensive guidance in carrying out protection mandates. It requested the Secretary-General to develop, in consultation with relevant actors, an operational concept for that purpose.

By other terms of the wide-ranging text, the Council emphasized the need for a comprehensive approach to implementing protection mandates – through attention to economic growth, good governance, democracy, the rule of law and respect for human rights, among other considerations.

== See also ==
- List of United Nations Security Council Resolutions 1801 to 1900 (2008–2009)
