= United Nations Security Council Resolution 825 =

1993 UN resolution

UN Security Council Resolution 825
- North Korea and nuclear weapons
- Date: 11 May 1993
- Meeting no.: 3,212
- Code: S/RES/825 (Document)
- Subject: Non-proliferation; Democratic People's Republic of Korea
- Voting summary: 13 voted for; None voted against; 2 abstained
- Result: Adopted

Security Council composition
- Permanent members: China; France; Russia; United Kingdom; United States
- Non-permanent members: Brazil; Cape Verde; Djibouti; Hungary; Japan; Morocco; New Zealand; Pakistan; Spain; Venezuela

United Nations Security Council resolution 825, adopted on 11 May 1993, called upon the Democratic People's Republic of Korea (the DPRK, or North Korea) to reconsider its decision to withdraw from the Treaty on the Non-Proliferation of Nuclear Weapons and allow weapons inspectors from the International Atomic Energy Agency (IAEA) into the country, after it had previously refused entry.

== Background ==
On 30 January 1992, North Korea officially signed the Nuclear Non-Proliferation Treaty (NPT) in a "full scope safeguards agreement" after originally acceding to it in 1985, which allowed inspections to begin in June 1992; however, meetings failed to establish a bilateral inspection regime. The IAEA was not satisfied that North Korea had fully disclosed its plutonium production and requested access to certain facilities. Due to lack of progress in the negotiations, and the DPRK's refusal to allow inspection of two suspected nuclear waste sites, North Korea notified the IAEA on 12 March 1993 concerning its intention to withdraw from the Non-Proliferation Treaty. The Board of Governors at the IAEA later notified the Security Council that North Korea was not in compliance with its obligations under the Joint Agreement between the DPRK and the IAEA.

== Provisions ==
The resolution passed with 13 votes, none against and two abstentions from the People's Republic of China and Pakistan, which both called for North Korea to return to the NPT. The Security Council noted with concern the intentions of the DPRK and reaffirmed the "crucial contribution which progress in non-proliferation can make to the maintenance of international peace and security" and called on the North Korean government to be committed and honour its obligations under the Treaty. The resolution also required the Director-General of the IAEA to consult with the DPRK to find a solution and report back in due course. At the insistence of the People's Republic of China, which abstained, the resolution did not make reference to any sanctions if North Korea failed to comply with the Security Council.

== Aftermath ==
North Korea accused the IAEA of "liquidating her socialism" and conducted further missile tests on 29–30 May 1993, firing Rodong-1 ballistic missiles into the East Sea. After direct negotiations with the United States, North Korea revoked its earlier decision to withdraw from the NPT in June 1993 and weapons inspections resumed, though not under the full terms of access under the original Joint Agreement. In October 1994, the ongoing negotiations resulted in the Agreed Framework in which the DPRK agreed to the original 1992 IAEA safeguards and to freeze and dismantle its nuclear reactors and other facilities under the supervision of the IAEA in exchange for light water reactors.

== See also ==
- List of United Nations Security Council Resolutions 801 to 900 (1993–1994)
- United Nations Security Council Resolution 1874
- North Korea and weapons of mass destruction
- 1993-1994 North Korean nuclear crisis
