= List of United Nations Security Council Resolutions 1801 to 1900 =

This is a list of United Nations Security Council Resolutions 1801 to 1900 adopted between 20 February 2008 and 16 December 2009.

| Resolution | Date | Vote | Concerns |
|---|---|---|---|
| 1801 | 20 February 2008 | 15–0-0 | The situation in Somalia Further information: Somali Civil War |
| 1802 | 25 February 2008 | 15–0–0 | The situation in Timor-Leste |
| 1803 | 3 March 2008 | 14–0–1 (abstention: Indonesia) | Non-proliferation |
| 1804 | 13 March 2008 | 15–0–0 | The situation in The Great Lakes Region (Democratic Republic of the Congo) |
| 1805 | 20 March 2008 | 15–0–0 | Threats to international peace and security caused by terrorist acts |
| 1806 | 20 March 2008 | 15–0–0 | The situation in Afghanistan Further information: War in Afghanistan (2001–present) |
| 1807 | 31 March 2008 | 15–0-0 | The situation concerning the Democratic Republic of the Congo |
| 1808 | 15 April 2008 | 15–0–0 | The situation in Georgia |
| 1809 | 16 April 2008 | 15–0–0 | Peace and security in Africa |
| 1810 | 25 April 2008 | 15–0–0 | Non-proliferation of weapons of mass destruction |
| 1811 | 29 April 2008 | 15–0–0 | The situation in Somalia |
| 1812 | 30 April 2008 | 15–0–0 | Reports of the Secretary-General on the Sudan |
| 1813 | 30 April 2008 | 15–0–0 | The situation concerning Western Sahara |
| 1814 | 15 May 2008 | 15–0–0 | The situation in Somalia |
| 1815 | 2 June 2008 | 15–0–0 | The situation in the Middle East |
| 1816 | 2 June 2008 | 15–0–0 | The situation in Somalia |
| 1817 | 11 June 2008 | 15–0–0 | The situation in Afghanistan |
| 1818 | 13 June 2008 | 15–0–0 | The situation in Cyprus |
| 1819 | 18 June 2008 | 15–0–0 | The situation in Liberia |
| 1820 | 19 June 2008 | 15–0–0 | Women and Peace and Security |
| 1821 | 27 June 2008 | 15–0–0 | The situation in the Middle East |
| 1822 | 30 June 2008 | 15–0–0 | Threats to international peace and security caused by terrorist acts |
| 1823 | 10 July 2008 | 15–0–0 | The situation concerning Rwanda |
| 1824 | 18 July 2008 | 15–0–0 | International Criminal Tribunal for Rwanda |
| 1825 | 23 July 2008 | 15–0–0 | Letter dated 22 November 2006 from the Secretary-General addressed to the President of the Security Council (S/2006/920) |
| 1826 | 29 July 2008 | 15–0–0 | The situation in Côte d’Ivoire |
| 1827 | 30 July 2008 | 15–0–0 | The situation between Eritrea and Ethiopia |
| 1828 | 31 July 2008 | 14–0–1 (abstention: United States) | Reports of the Secretary-General on the Sudan |
| 1829 | 4 August 2008 | 15–0–0 | The situation in Sierra Leone |
| 1830 | 7 August 2008 | 15–0–0 | The situation concerning Iraq |
| 1831 | 19 August 2008 | 15–0–0 | The situation in Somalia |
| 1832 | 27 August 2008 | 15–0–0 | The situation in the Middle East |
| 1833 | 22 September 2008 | 15–0–0 | The situation in Afghanistan |
| 1834 | 24 September 2008 | 15–0–0 | The situation in Chad, the Central African Republic and the subregion |
| 1835 | 27 September 2008 | 15–0–0 | Non-proliferation |
| 1836 | 29 September 2008 | 15–0–0 | The situation in Liberia |
| 1837 | 29 September 2008 | 15–0–0 | International Criminal Tribunal for the former Yugoslavia |
| 1838 | 7 October 2008 | 15–0–0 | The situation in Somalia |
| 1839 | 9 October 2008 | 15–0–0 | The situation in Georgia |
| 1840 | 14 October 2008 | 15–0–0 | The situation concerning Haiti |
| 1841 | 15 October 2008 | 15–0–0 | Reports of the Secretary-General on the Sudan |
| 1842 | 29 October 2008 | 15–0–0 | The situation in Côte d’Ivoire |
| 1843 | 20 November 2008 | 15–0–0 | The situation concerning the Democratic Republic of the Congo Further information: Kivu conflict |
| 1844 | 20 November 2008 | 15–0–0 | The situation in Somalia |
| 1845 | 20 November 2008 | 15–0–0 | The situation in Bosnia and Herzegovina |
| 1846 | 2 December 2008 | 15–0–0 | The situation in Somalia |
| 1847 | 12 December 2008 | 15–0–0 | The situation in Cyprus |
| 1848 | 12 December 2008 | 15–0–0 | The situation in the Middle East |
| 1849 | 12 December 2008 | 15–0–0 | International Criminal Tribunal for the former Yugoslavia |
| 1850 | 16 December 2008 | 14–0–1 (abstention: Libya) | The situation in the Middle East, including the Palestinian question Further information: Israeli–Palestinian conflict |
| 1851 | 16 December 2008 | 15–0–0 | The situation in Somalia |
| 1852 | 16 December 2008 | 15–0–0 | The situation in the Middle East |
| 1853 | 19 December 2008 | 15–0–0 | The situation in Somalia |
| 1854 | 19 December 2008 | 15–0–0 | The situation in Liberia |
| 1855 | 19 December 2008 | 15–0–0 | International Criminal Tribunal for Rwanda |
| 1856 | 22 December 2008 | 15–0–0 | The situation concerning the Democratic Republic of the Congo |
| 1857 | 22 December 2008 | 15–0–0 | The situation concerning the Democratic Republic of the Congo |
| 1858 | 22 December 2008 | 15–0–0 | The situation in Burundi |
| 1859 | 22 December 2008 | 15–0–0 | The situation concerning Iraq |
| 1860 | 9 January 2009 | 14–0–1 (abstention: United States) | The situation in the Middle East, including the Palestinian question Further information: 2008–2009 Israel–Gaza conflict |
| 1861 | 14 January 2009 | 15–0–0 | The situation in Chad, the Central African Republic and the subregion |
| 1862 | 14 January 2009 | 15–0–0 | Peace and security in Africa Further information: 2008 Djiboutian–Eritrean border conflict |
| 1863 | 16 January 2009 | 15–0–0 | The situation in Somalia |
| 1864 | 23 January 2009 | 15–0–0 | Extending the mandate of United Nations Mission in Nepal until 23 July 2009 |
| 1865 | 27 January 2009 | 15–0–0 | The situation in Côte d'Ivoire |
| 1866 | 13 February 2009 | 15–0–0 | Extending mission of the United Nations Observer Mission in Georgia |
| 1867 | 26 February 2009 | 15–0–0 | Extending the United Nations Integrated Mission in East Timor until 26 February 2010 |
| 1868 | 23 March 2009 | 15–0–0 | The situation in Afghanistan. Extending UNAMA until 23 March 2010 |
| 1869 | 25 March 2009 | 15–0–0 | Welcoming the new designate Valentin Inzko as High Representative for Bosnia and Herzegovina |
| 1870 | 30 April 2009 | 15–0–0 | Extending the United Nations Mission in Sudan until 30 April 2010 |
| 1871 | 30 April 2009 | 15–0–0 | Extending the United Nations Mission for the Referendum in Western Sahara until 30 April 2010 |
| 1872 | 26 May 2009 | 15–0–0 | Extending the African Union Mission in Somalia (AMISOM) until 31 January 2010 |
| 1873 | 29 May 2009 | 14–1–0 (against: Turkey) | Extending the mandate of the United Nations Peacekeeping Force in Cyprus until 15 December 2009 |
| 1874 | 12 June 2009 | 15–0–0 | Imposes further sanctions on North Korea following a recent nuclear test |
| 1875 | 23 June 2009 | 15–0–0 | Renews the mandate of the United Nations Disengagement Observer Force until 31 December 2009 |
| 1876 | 26 June 2009 | 15–0–0 | Extends the mandate of the United Nations Peacebuilding Support Office in Guinea-Bissau until 31 December 2009 |
| 1877 | 7 July 2009 | 15–0–0 | Extends the term of the judges at the International Criminal Tribunal for the former Yugoslavia until 31 December 2009 |
| 1878 | 7 July 2009 | 15–0–0 | Extension of the terms of office of ad litern and permanent judges at the International Criminal Tribunal for Rwanda until 31 December 2009 and 2010 respectively, and on amending article 13 of the Statute of the International Tribunal |
| 1879 | 23 July 2009 | 15–0–0 | Renewal of the mandate of the United Nations Mission in Nepal until 23 January 2010 |
| 1880 | 30 July 2009 | 15–0–0 | Renews mandate of United Nations Operation in Côte d’Ivoire until 31 January 2010 |
| 1881 | 30 July 2009 | 15–0–0 | Extends the African Union - United Nations Hybrid Operation in Darfur until 31 July 2010 |
| 1882 | 4 August 2009 | 15–0–0 | Condemning the use of, and asking member states to respect resolutions against the use of children in armed conflict |
| 1883 | 7 August 2009 | 15–0–0 | Extension of the mandate of the United Nations Assistance Mission in Iraq |
| 1884 | 27 August 2009 | 15–0–0 | Renewing mandate for the United Nations Interim Force in Lebanon until 31 August 2010 |
| 1885 | 15 September 2009 | 15–0–0 | Extending the United Nations Mission in Liberia mandate until 30 September 2010 |
| 1886 | 15 September 2009 | 15–0–0 | Renewing mandate of United Nations Integrated Peacebuilding Office in Sierra Leone until 30 September 2010 |
| 1887 | 24 September 2009 | 15–0–0 by heads of state or government and Permanent Representative (Libya) | Pledging support for the end to the proliferation of nuclear weapons and ensuring a reduction in nuclear weapons stockpiles and fissile material |
| 1888 | 30 September 2009 | 15–0–0 | Mandates peacekeeping missions to protect women and girls from sexual violence in armed conflict |
| 1889 | 5 October 2009 | 15–0–0 | Reaffirmes resolution 1325 (2000) on "women and peace and security", and condemns continuing sexual violence against women in conflict and post-conflict situations |
| 1890 | 8 October 2009 | 15–0–0 | Condemning "in the strongest terms" a suicide bombing at the Indian embassy in Afghanistan |
| 1891 | 13 October 2009 | 15–0–0 | Extending the mandate of the Panel of Experts in Sudan to monitor the arms embargo and sanctions until 15 October 2010. |
| 1892 | 13 October 2009 | 15–0–0 | Renewing the mandate of United Nations Stabilization Mission in Haiti (MINUSTAH) until 15 October 2010. |
| 1893 | 29 October 2009 | 15–0–0 | Renewing measures on arms, financial and travel, banning importation of rough diamonds from Côte d'Ivoire, extending mandate of Group of Experts until 31 October 2010. |
| 1894 | 11 November 2009 | 15–0–0 | Calling on member states to respect human rights of civilians in armed conflict, and to act according to international law. |
| 1895 | 18 November 2009 | 15–0–0 | Authorisation of member states to establish for a further 12 months a multinational stabilization force (EUFOR) in Bosnia and Herzegovina to succeed SFOR. |
| 1896 | 30 November 2009 | 15–0–0 | Extending the mandate of the committee established pursuant to resolution 1533 (2004) and extension of measures on arms, transport, financial and travel against the Democratic Republic of the Congo imposed by resolution 1807 (2008). |
| 1897 | 30 November 2009 | 15–0–0 | On acts of piracy and armed robbery against vessels in the waters off the coast of Somalia. |
| 1898 | 14 December 2009 | 14–1–0 (against: Turkey) | Extension of the mandate of the UN Peacekeeping Force in Cyprus until 15 June 2010. |
| 1899 | 16 December 2009 | 15–0–0 | Extension of the mandate of the United Nations Disengagement Observer Force until 30 June 2010. |
| 1900 | 16 December 2009 | 15–0–0 | Extension of the terms of office of permanent and ad litem judges to the International Criminal Tribunal for the former Yugoslavia and on temporarily amending article 12, paragraph 1, of the Statute of the International Tribunal |

== See also ==
- Lists of United Nations Security Council resolutions
- List of United Nations Security Council Resolutions 1701 to 1800
- List of United Nations Security Council Resolutions 1901 to 2000
