= United Nations Security Council Resolution 2078 =

UN Security Council Resolution 2078
- Democratic Republic of the Congo Map
- Date: 28 November 2012
- Meeting no.: 6,873
- Code: S/RES/2078 (Document)
- Subject: The situation in the Democratic Republic of the Congo
- Voting summary: 15 voted for; None voted against; None abstained
- Result: Adopted

Security Council composition
- Permanent members: China; France; Russia; United Kingdom; United States
- Non-permanent members: Azerbaijan; Colombia; Germany; Guatemala; India; Morocco; Pakistan; Portugal; South Africa; Togo

United Nations Security Council Resolution 2078 was unanimously adopted on 28 November 2012.

The Security Council renewed until 1 February 2014 the measures on arms imposed by paragraph 1 of resolution 1807 (2008), renew the measures on transport and the financial and travel measures imposed by that resolution.

== Observations ==
In the preamble of the resolution, the Council reiterated its concern about the situation in eastern Democratic Republic of the Congo due to the M23 rebellion. The Security Council condemned the continuing violation of resolutions 1533 (2004), 1807 (2008), 1857 (2008), 1896 (2009), 1952 (2010) and 2021 (2011). It also condemned human rights abuses and humanitarian law violations against civilians.

== Acts ==
Acting under Chapter VII of the United Nations Charter, the Council renewed the arms embargo concerning the Democratic Republic of the Congo until February 1, 2014, along with travel, financial and transport sanctions. Meanwhile, the Secretary-General Ban Ki-moon was requested to extend the mandate of the group of experts established in resolution 1533 (2004) and renewed by subsequent resolutions until February 1, 2014. The group was asked to present to the Council a mid-term report by 28 June 2013 and a final report before 13 December 2013.

The Resolution condemned the March 23 Movement for its attacks on the civilian population and MONUSCO peacekeepers, and demands the rebels groups in the area (FDLR, LRA, Mai-Mai militias, FNL and ADF) to cease immediately all forms of violence.

== See also ==
- List of United Nations Security Council Resolutions 2001 to 2100
- M23 rebellion
- Kivu conflict
