= United Nations Security Council Resolution 1943 =

UN Security Council Resolution 1943
- NATO ISAF ribbon bar
- Date: 13 October 2010
- Meeting no.: 6,395
- Code: S/RES/1943 (Document)
- Subject: The situation in Afghanistan
- Voting summary: 15 voted for; None voted against; None abstained
- Result: Adopted

Security Council composition
- Permanent members: China; France; Russia; United Kingdom; United States
- Non-permanent members: Austria; Bosnia–Herzegovina; Brazil; Gabon; Japan; Lebanon; Mexico; Nigeria; Turkey; Uganda

United Nations Security Council Resolution 1943, adopted unanimously on October 13, 2010, after reaffirming all resolutions on the situation in Afghanistan and terrorism, including resolutions 1267 (1999), 1368 (2001), 1373 (2001), 1386 (2001), 1510 (2003), 1822 (2008), 1833 (2008), 1890 (2009), 1904 (2009) and 1917 (2010), the Council extended the authorisation of the International Security Assistance Force (ISAF) operating in the country for a period of one year.

The resolution was drafted by Turkey.

== Resolution ==
=== Observations ===
In the preamble of the resolution, the Council reiterated its support for the eradication of international terrorism. It determined that the Afghan authorities were ultimately responsible for maintaining order in the country and the assistance provided by ISAF in this regard. The Council recognised that advances in areas relating to security, governance, human rights, law enforcement, development, anti-narcotics, anti-corruption and accountability were all linked. Furthermore, it recognised the support of the international community for a phased transition of responsibilities from NATO to the Afghan authorities, and the role of the international community in training and supporting the Afghan National Security Forces. The United Nations, through its Assistance Mission in the country, would play a role in promoting peace and security.

Meanwhile, the Security Council was concerned about and condemned the increased violence and terrorism in the country by the Taliban, Al-Qaeda and other groups, as well as stronger links between terrorism and the illegal drug trade. It urged greater efforts by the Afghan government to tackle drug trafficking. There was also concern at the high number of civilian victims of the conflict, caused primarily by the Taliban, Al-Qaeda and other groups according to the council, while progress was noted in reducing civilian casualties by ISAF and other international forces. Additionally, the Council expressed concern at the use and recruitment of child soldiers by the Taliban, and the use of civilians as human shields was strongly condemned.

The Council acknowledged progress with security sector reform, though it determined that more progress was necessary with regard to impunity, strengthening judicial institutions, prison sector reform, human rights (particularly those of women and girls) and the rule of law. It also urged Afghan political parties to engage in political dialogue.

=== Acts ===
Acting under Chapter VII of the United Nations Charter, the authorisation given to ISAF to operate in Afghanistan was extended for an additional year, until October 13, 2011, with all states participating in the force authorised to use "all necessary measures" to fulfil its mandate. The Council requested further contributions towards ISAF in order for it to meet its operational requirements.

Meanwhile, the resolution emphasised the importance of strengthening the Afghan security sector and urged troop-contributing countries to continue training Afghan security forces. It welcomed the increasing responsibility of the Afghan security forces with the aim of a self-sufficient and accountable security sector. Finally, the Security Council was to be kept informed on developments in Afghanistan through the ISAF leadership and the United Nations Secretary-General Ban Ki-moon.

== See also ==
- War in Afghanistan (1978–present)
- List of United Nations Security Council Resolutions 1901 to 2000 (2009–2011)
- Operation Enduring Freedom
- United Nations Assistance Mission in Afghanistan
- War in Afghanistan (2001–present)
