= United Nations Security Council Resolution 1865 =

UN Security Council Resolution 1865
- Map location of Côte d'Ivoire within Africa
- Date: 27 January 2009
- Meeting no.: 6,076
- Code: S/2009/1865 (Document)
- Subject: The situation in Cote d'Ivoire
- Voting summary: 15 voted for; None voted against; None abstained
- Result: Adopted

Security Council composition
- Permanent members: China; France; Russia; United Kingdom; United States
- Non-permanent members: Austria; Burkina Faso; Costa Rica; Croatia; Japan; Libya; Mexico; Turkey; Uganda; Vietnam

United Nations Security Council Resolution 1865, adopted unanimously January 27, 2009, after recalling resolutions 1739 (2007), 1765 (2007), 1795 (2008), 1826 (2008) and 1842 (2008) on the situation in Côte d'Ivoire and Resolution 1836 concerning Liberia, the Council renewed the mandate of the United Nations Operation in Côte d'Ivoire (UNOCI) until 31 July 2009 and the French forces that support it, while also reducing the missions strength to one battalion and endorsing the adjustment of UNOCI's posture and configuration.

== Details ==
The United Nations Security Council endorsed a report by the Secretary-General stating that while UNOCI had created increased stability in Côte d'Ivoire, the fragile and delicate electoral process required the UN force to remain in the country as well as to complete implementation of goals set forth by the March 2007 Ouagadougou Agreement, involving disarmament and identification of the population, in order to allow free elections. Thus the resolution extended UNCOI mandate by six months to 31 July 2009. The force was reduced by a battalion, decreasing the number of UN peacekeepers from 8,115 to 7,450, as well as placing peacekeepers in fewer, but more concentrated, positions, from which sufficient troop numbers could be rapidly deployed as airborne quick-reaction detachments.

While welcoming the signature on 22 December of the fourth Supplementary Agreement to the Ouagadougou Political Agreement of 2007, the Council took note of the delays in the implementation of that accord, urging the parties to make progress in order to create a secure environment for upcoming elections; disarmament and dismantling of militias; the cantonment and disarmament, demobilization and reintegration programme; unification and restructuring of defence and security forces; and restoration of State authority throughout the country.

== See also ==
- First Ivorian Civil War
- List of United Nations Security Council Resolutions 1801 to 1900 (2008–2009)
