= United Nations Security Council Resolution 1898 =

UN Security Council Resolution 1898
- Date: 14 December 2009
- Meeting no.: 6,239
- Code: S/RES/1898 (Document)
- Subject: The situation in Cyprus
- Voting summary: 14 voted for; 1 voted against; None abstained
- Result: Adopted

Security Council composition
- Permanent members: China; France; Russia; United Kingdom; United States
- Non-permanent members: Austria; Burkina Faso; Costa Rica; Croatia; Japan; Libya; Mexico; Turkey; Uganda; Vietnam

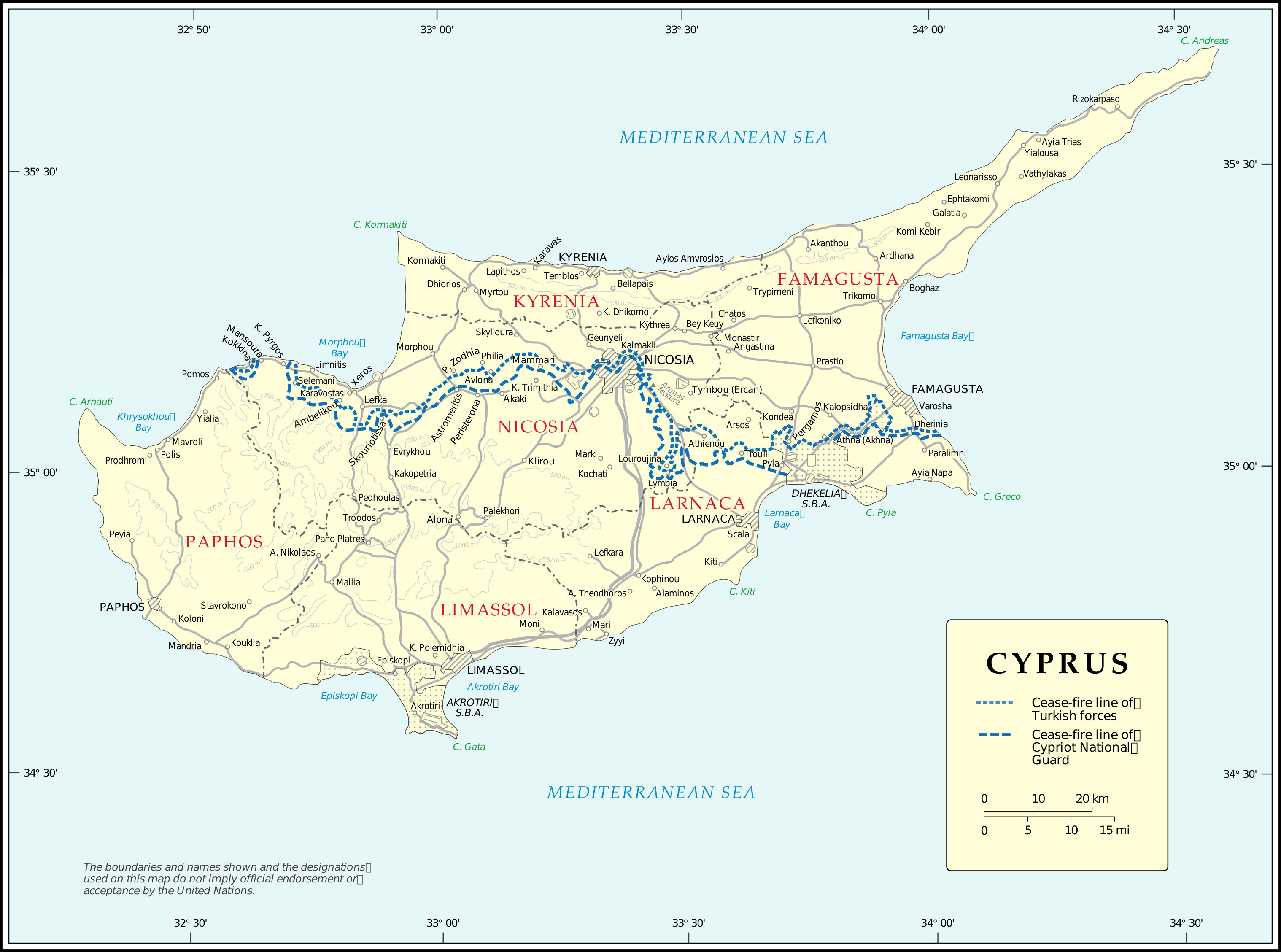

United Nations Security Council Resolution 1898 was adopted on 14 December 2009.

== Resolution ==
Urging the parties in Cyprus to build on previous progress in negotiations for the reunification of the divided island by intensifying the momentum of talks, the Security Council this morning extended the mandate of the United Nations peacekeeping force there, known as UNFICYP, until 15 June 2010.

By a vote of 14 in favour to 1 against (Turkey), the Council adopted resolution 1898 (2009), which also urged that the Greek and Turkish Cypriot sides put in place confidence-building measures, including the opening of additional crossing points.

Through the resolution, the Council called on the two sides to continue to engage as a matter of urgency, in consultation with UNFICYP, on the demarcation of the buffer zone and on the United Nations 1989 aide-memoire, with a view to reaching an early agreement on outstanding issues.

It also called on the Turkish Cypriot and Turkish forces to restore in Strovilia the military status quo which existed there prior to 30 June 2009.

Explaining his negative vote, the representative of Turkey explained that he objected to references to the "Government of Cyprus", as there had not been a joint Government representing all the people of the island since the partnership State collapsed in 1963, when Turkish Cypriots were expelled from all State institutions.

Since then, he said, Greek and Turkish Cypriots lived under separate administrations. He maintained that considerations of the "Government of Cyprus" had been the main obstacle to finding a just, lasting solution for 45 years.

In addition, he said that the resolution failed to seek the open consent of the two sides for the extension of the mission. It also failed to make reference to resolution 1250 (1999), which lay at the source of the good offices mission of the Secretary-General, which Turkey fully supported.

He welcomed progress achieved so far in the negotiations that aimed at establishing a partnership State with a federal Government and two constituent States, as the two leaders have agreed, on the basis of the well established United Nations parameters, namely, bizonality, political equality and equal status of the two peoples.

== See also ==
- List of United Nations Security Council Resolutions 1801 to 1900 (2008–2009)
