= United Nations Security Council Resolution 1882 =

UN Security Council Resolution 1882
- Date: 4 August 2009
- Meeting no.: 6,132
- Code: S/RES/1873 (Document)
- Subject: Children and armed conflict
- Voting summary: 15 voted for; None voted against; None abstained
- Result: Adopted

Security Council composition
- Permanent members: China; France; Russia; United Kingdom; United States
- Non-permanent members: Austria; Burkina Faso; Costa Rica; Croatia; Japan; Libya; Mexico; Turkey; Uganda; Vietnam

United Nations Security Council Resolution 1882 was unanimously adopted on 4 August 2009.

== Resolution ==
Parties to armed conflict engaging in patterns of "killing and maiming of children and/or rape and other sexual violence against children" must also be listed in the Secretary-General's reports on children in armed conflict, according to resolution 1882 (2009), adopted unanimously by the Security Council.

The Council action was the culmination of a day-long debate on 29 April during which Secretary-General Ban Ki-moon urged the 15-nation body to "strike a blow against... impunity" by, at a minimum, expanding its criteria to include on the “list of shame", parties committing rape and other serious sexual violence against children during armed conflict.

Before the vote, only state and non-state parties that had recruited child soldiers or used children in situations of armed conflict were explicitly named, the so-called list of shame, in annexes to the Secretary-General's annual report on the implementation of resolution 1612 (2005), which established a Monitoring and Reporting Mechanism and set up a working group on Children and Armed Conflict.

The reports cover compliance and progress in ending six grave violations: the recruitment and use of children; killing and maiming of children; rape and other grave sexual violence; abductions; attacks on schools and hospitals; and denial of humanitarian access to children. Document S/2009/158 lists 56 such parties, including 19 persistent violators who have been listed for more than four years.

== See also ==
- List of United Nations Security Council Resolutions 1801 to 1900 (2008–2009)
