= United Nations Security Council Resolution 1870 =

UN Security Council Resolution 1870
- Date: 30 April 2009
- Meeting no.: 6,116
- Code: S/RES/1870 (Document)
- Subject: Reports of the Secretary-General on the Sudan
- Voting summary: 15 voted for; None voted against; None abstained
- Result: Adopted

Security Council composition
- Permanent members: China; France; Russia; United Kingdom; United States
- Non-permanent members: Austria; Burkina Faso; Costa Rica; Croatia; Japan; Libya; Mexico; Turkey; Uganda; Vietnam

United Nations Security Council Resolution 1870, unanimously adopted on 30 April 2009, extended the mandate of the United Nations Mission in Sudan for another year urging all parties to comply fully with the 2005 Comprehensive Peace Agreement that ended a 21-year civil war between north and south Sudan.

== Resolution ==
The Security Council today extended the mandate of the United Nations Mission in Sudan for another year, urging all parties to comply fully with the 2005 Comprehensive Peace Agreement that ended a 21-year Sudanese Civil War.

Unanimously adopting resolution 1870 (2009), the Council extended the mandate of the United Nations Mission in the country (UNMIS) through 30 April 2010, requested the Mission to prepare to assist the parties with the planned national referendum in 2011, if requested, and to support credible national elections next year, in coordination with the United Nation Development Programme (UNDP), urging donors to provide technical and material assistance.

The council established UNMIS four years ago to support implementation of the Comprehensive Peace Agreement between the Government of the Sudan and the Sudan People's Liberation Movement/Army (SPLM/A) that ended the African continent's longest-running civil war. The Agreement established a ceasefire and provided for power-sharing, wealth-sharing, security arrangements (including the establishment of Joint Integrated Units of Army and Police) and modalities for elections (including a census).

By the resolution, the Council called for all parties to cooperate with full and unrestricted access to UNMIS in monitoring and verification of the Abyei region and urged the mission to deploy sufficient personnel to that region to improve conflict prevention efforts and security to the civilian population. It also called on parties to abide by and implement the decision of the Abyei Arbitration Tribunal at the Permanent Court of Arbitration on the final settlement of the Abyei boundary dispute.

Expressing its concern for the health and welfare of the civilian populations in the Sudan, it called on the parties to support, protect and facilitate all humanitarian operations and personnel in the Sudan, and urged the Government of the Sudan to continue working with the United Nations to ensure the continuity of humanitarian assistance.

Deploring the persistent localized conflict and violence, especially within Southern Sudan, the Council called on UNMIS to strengthen its conflict management capacity by completing as soon as possible its integrated strategy to support local tribal conflict resolution mechanisms. The council also welcomed the development of a comprehensive strategy on the protection of civilians and encouraged the Mission to continue and complete its work on the strategy in a timely manner.

== See also ==
- List of United Nations Security Council Resolutions 1801 to 1900 (2008–2009)
