= United Nations Security Council Resolution 1859 =

UN Security Council Resolution 1859
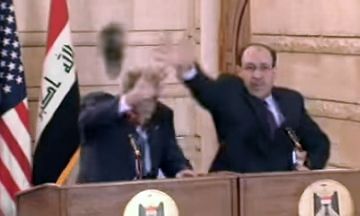
- Bush shoeing incident
- Date: 22 December 2008
- Meeting no.: 6,059
- Code: S/RES/1859 (Document)
- Subject: The situation concerning Iraq
- Voting summary: 15 voted for; None voted against; None abstained
- Result: Adopted

Security Council composition
- Permanent members: China; France; Russia; United Kingdom; United States
- Non-permanent members: Burkina Faso; Belgium; Costa Rica; Croatia; Indonesia; Italy; Libya; Panama; South Africa; Vietnam

United Nations Security Council Resolution 1859 was unanimously adopted on 22 December 2008.

== Resolution ==
Noting Iraq’s progress in the security, political and economic fields, while recognizing that the country still needed regional and international support in order to advance further, the Security Council decided today to extend until 31 December 2009 arrangements for depositing the proceeds from sales of petroleum, petroleum products and natural gas into the Development Fund for Iraq. It also decided to review all resolutions pertaining to Iraq from 1990.

Unanimously adopting resolution 1859 (2008) under Chapter VII of the United Nations Charter, the Council also extended the task of the International Advisory and Monitoring Board in overseeing the Fund for the same period. The Council decided that those decisions would be reviewed upon request by the Government of Iraq or no later than 15 June 2009, while encouraging the International Monetary Fund (IMF) and the World Bank, as members of the International Advisory and Monitoring Board, to brief the Council in January 2009.

Regarding its decision to review resolutions pertaining specifically to Iraq, beginning with resolution 661 (1990), the Council requested the Secretary-General, after consultations with Iraq, to report on facts relevant to consideration by the Council of actions necessary for that country to achieve an international standing equal to that it had enjoyed prior to the adoption of such resolutions.

== See also ==
- List of United Nations Security Council Resolutions 1801 to 1900 (2008–2009)
