= United Nations Security Council Resolution 1875 =

UN Security Council Resolution 1875
- Date: 23 June 2009
- Meeting no.: 6,148
- Code: S/RES/1875 (Document)
- Subject: Renews the mandate of the United Nations Disengagement Observer Force until 31 December 2009
- Voting summary: 15 voted for; None voted against; None abstained
- Result: Adopted

Security Council composition
- Permanent members: China; France; Russia; United Kingdom; United States
- Non-permanent members: Austria; Burkina Faso; Costa Rica; Croatia; Japan; Libya; Mexico; Turkey; Uganda; Vietnam

The United Nations Security Council Resolution 1875 was unanimously adopted on 23 June 2009.

== Resolution ==
The Security Council this morning renewed the mandate of the United Nations Disengagement Observer Force (UNDOF), which has supervised the ceasefire between Israel and Syria since 1974, for the six months ending 30 December 2009.

Unanimously adopting resolution 1875 (2009), the Council also called for the implementation of its resolution 338 of 1973, which required immediate negotiations between the parties with the aim of establishing a just and lasting peace in the Middle East.

In conjunction with the adoption of today’s resolution, a statement was also read out by Council President Baki İlkin(Turkey), reiterating that tension would remain until such a just and lasting peace in the region could be reached (to be issued as document S/PRST/2009/18).

In his latest report on UNDOF (see document S/2009/295), United Nations Secretary-General Ban Ki-moon recommended the extension of the Force, noting that, while the situation in the Golan Heights has been “generally quiet”, the overall region is tense. Mr. Ban encouraged the parties to resume the indirect peace talks, initiated under the auspices of Turkey and aimed at a comprehensive peace ‑‑ in accordance with the Madrid Conference terms of reference of peace ‑‑ and also drew attention to $17 million in unpaid assessments for UNDOF’s funding.

== See also ==
- List of United Nations Security Council Resolutions 1801 to 1900 (2008–2009)
