= United Nations Security Council Resolution 1899 =

UN Security Council Resolution 1899
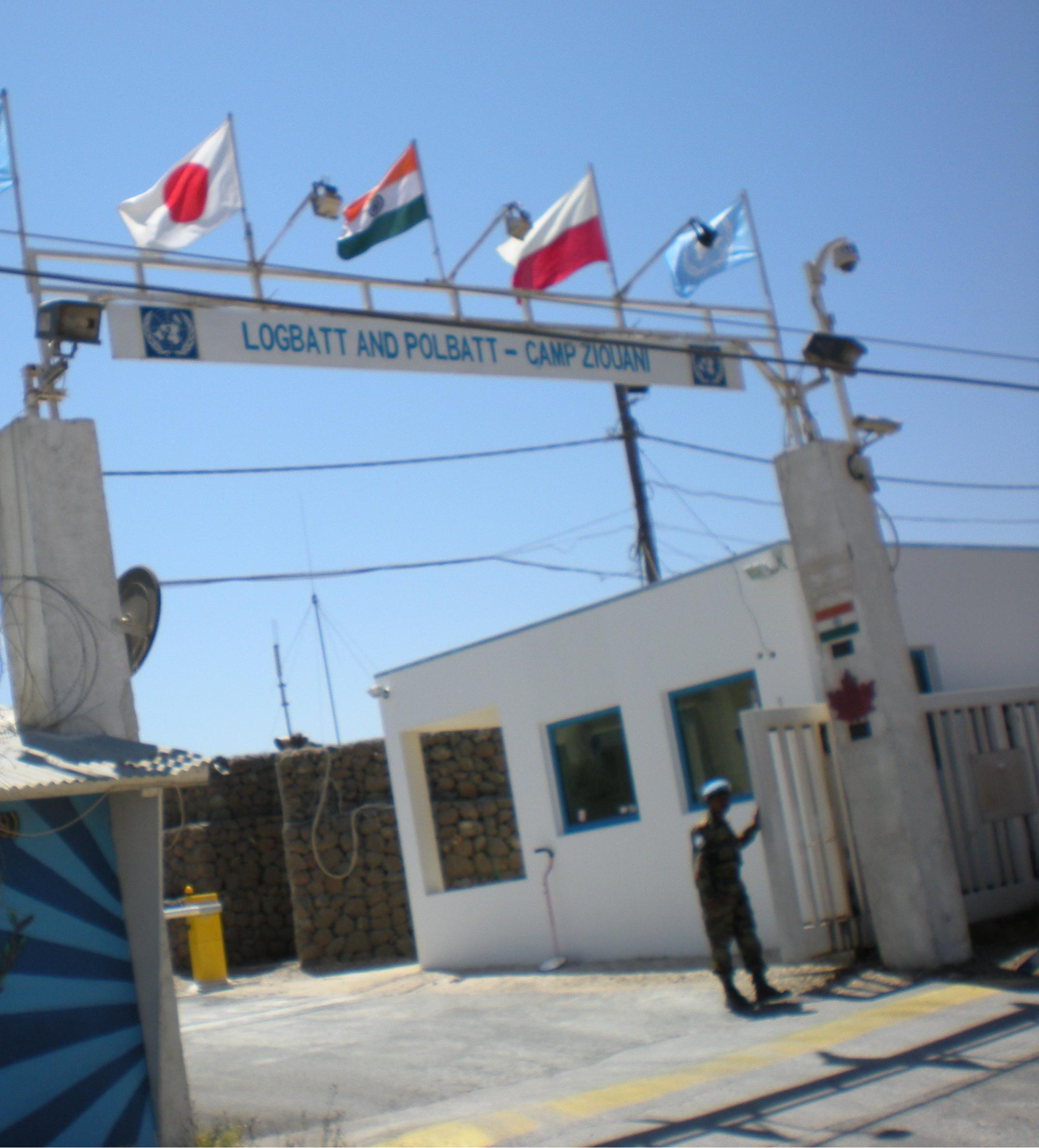
- UNDOF base
- Date: 16 December 2009
- Meeting no.: 6,241
- Code: S/RES/1899 (Document)
- Subject: The situation in the Middle East
- Voting summary: 15 voted for; None voted against; None abstained
- Result: Adopted

Security Council composition
- Permanent members: China; France; Russia; United Kingdom; United States
- Non-permanent members: Austria; Burkina Faso; Costa Rica; Croatia; Japan; Libya; Mexico; Turkey; Uganda; Vietnam

United Nations Security Council Resolution 1899 was unanimously adopted on 16 December 2009.

== Resolution ==
The Security Council today renewed the mandate of the United Nations Disengagement Observer Force (UNDOF), which has supervised the ceasefire between Israel and Syria since 1974, for the next six months until 30 June 2010.

Unanimously adopting resolution 1899 (2009), the Council also called for the implementation of its resolution 338 of 1973, which required immediate negotiations between the parties with the aim of establishing a just and lasting peace in the Middle East.

In conjunction with the adoption of the resolution, Council President Michel Kafando (Burkina Faso) read out a statement (to be issued as document S/PRST/2009/34) reiterating that tension in the region would remain until such a just and lasting peace in the region could be reached.

Secretary-General Ban Ki-moon, in his latest report on UNDOF (document S/2009/597), recommends extending the Force’s mandate, noting that, while the situation in the Golan Heights has been “generally quiet”, the overall region is tense. He encourages the parties to resume the indirect peace talks initiated under the auspices of Turkey and aimed at a comprehensive peace, in accordance with the Madrid Conference terms of reference.

He also drew attention to the amount of unpaid assessments for the Force, which stood at $19.1 million on 30 September.

== See also ==
- List of United Nations Security Council Resolutions 1801 to 1900 (2008–2009)
