= United Nations Security Council Resolution 1815 =

UN Security Council Resolution 1815
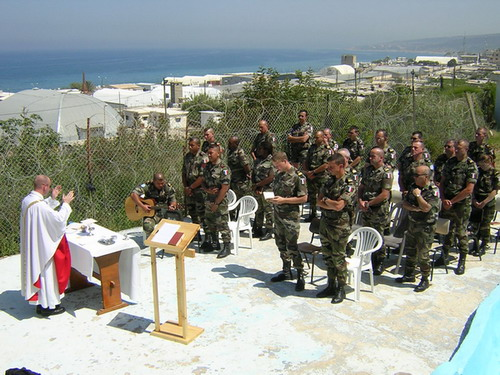
- UNIFIL personnel in a catholic mass
- Date: 2 June 2008
- Meeting no.: 5,901
- Code: S/RES/1815 (Document)
- Subject: The situation in the Middle East
- Voting summary: 15 voted for; None voted against; None abstained
- Result: Adopted

Security Council composition
- Permanent members: China; France; Russia; United Kingdom; United States
- Non-permanent members: Burkina Faso; Belgium; Costa Rica; Croatia; Indonesia; Italy; Libya; Panama; South Africa; Vietnam

United Nations Security Council Resolution 1815 was unanimously adopted on 2 June 2008.

== Resolution ==
The Security Council today extended the mandate of the International Independent Investigation Commission, which is investigating the 2005 murder of Lebanon’s former Prime Minister, Rafiq Hariri, and other attacks, until 31 December 2008.

Unanimously adopting resolution 1815 (2008), the Council left open the possibility of terminating the mandate earlier, if the Commission reported that it had completed implementation of that mandate.

The International Independent Investigation Commission was established on 7 April 2005 by resolution 1595 (see Press Release SC/8353), with the Lebanese Government’s approval, in order to investigate in all its aspects the terrorist attack that killed Mr. Hariri and others and caused the injury of numerous people, including helping to identify its perpetrators, sponsors, organizers and accomplices.

== See also ==
- List of United Nations Security Council Resolutions 1801 to 1900 (2008–2009)
