= United Nations Security Council Resolution 1819 =

UN Security Council Resolution 1819
- Date: 18 June 2008
- Meeting no.: 5,914
- Code: S/RES/1819 (Document)
- Subject: The situation in Liberia
- Voting summary: 15 voted for; None voted against; None abstained
- Result: Adopted

Security Council composition
- Permanent members: China; France; Russia; United Kingdom; United States
- Non-permanent members: Burkina Faso; Belgium; Costa Rica; Croatia; Indonesia; Italy; Libya; Panama; South Africa; Vietnam

United Nations Security Council Resolution 1819 was unanimously adopted on 18 June 2008.

== Resolution ==
The United Nations Security Council this morning requested that Secretary-General Ban Ki-moon renew until 20 December the mandate of a panel of financial experts and specialists that has been appointed to monitor implementation of the arms ban on Liberia, as well as assess progress made by the country in restoring its timber and diamond trade.

Acting under Chapter VII of the United Nations Charter, the Council unanimously adopted resolution 1819 (2008), asking the United Nations Panel of Experts on Liberia to report to the Council by 1 December through its sanctions Committee on all issues listed in paragraph 5 of resolution 1792 (2007), which includes: financing for the illicit trade of arms; Member States’ compliance with the freezing of assets of former Liberian President Charles Taylor; the Liberian Government’s compliance with the Kimberley Process Certification Scheme; recent forestry legislation; and progress in the timber and diamond sectors. The Council also asked the Panel to provide informal updates as appropriate beforehand.

Further to the resolution, the Council welcomed the Panel’s report, which addressed the issues of diamonds, timber, targeted sanctions and arms and security in Liberia. That report (document S/2008/371) noted only minor violations of the Council’s arms embargo during the Panel’s mandate in the last year, mainly involving the small-scale transfer of ammunition and single-barrel rifles from Côte d'Ivoire and Guinea. It also noted that none of the approximately $20 million in diverted tax revenue of former President Taylor found as part of a sample test had been frozen.

The report also stated that Liberia’s Government had made significant progress in implementing the 2006 National Forestry Reform Law, as well as the Kimberley Process Certification Scheme and its own internal controls system on rough diamond imports. Since the lifting of sanctions on rough diamonds, the Government Diamond Office had issued 43 Kimberley Process certificates and 39 rough diamond shipments had been legally exported as of 15 May.

== See also ==
- List of United Nations Security Council Resolutions 1801 to 1900 (2008–2009)
