= United Nations Security Council Resolution 1843 =

UN Security Council Resolution 1843
- Date: 20 November 2008
- Meeting no.: 6,018
- Code: S/RES/1843 (Document)
- Subject: The situation concerning the Democratic Republic of the Congo
- Voting summary: 15 voted for; None voted against; None abstained
- Result: Adopted

Security Council composition
- Permanent members: China; France; Russia; United Kingdom; United States
- Non-permanent members: Burkina Faso; Belgium; Costa Rica; Croatia; Indonesia; Italy; Libya; Panama; South Africa; Vietnam

United Nations Security Council Resolution 1843 was unanimously adopted on 20 November 2008.

== Resolution ==
The Security Council this morning authorized a temporary increase of the military strength of the United Nations Organization Mission in the Democratic Republic of the Congo (MONUC) of up to 2,785 military personnel, and the strength of its formed police unit of up to 300 personnel.

Unanimously adopting resolution 1843 (2008), the council, acting under Chapter VII of the United Nations Charter and following the recommendations by the Secretary-General in his letter of 12 November (document S/2008/703), authorized the immediate deployment of those additional capacities until 31 December. It expressed its intention to extend that authorization on the occasion of MONUC's mandate renewal, underlining that the duration of stay of the additional forces would depend on the security situation in the Kivus.

The Council stressed that the temporary increase in personnel was aimed at enabling MONUC to reinforce its capacity to protect civilians, to reconfigure its structure and forces and to optimize their deployment. It underscored the importance of MONUC implementing its mandate in full, including through robust rules of engagement.

After the vote, the representative of South Africa said his delegation had supported the resolution because the situation in the eastern Democratic Republic of the Congo, in particular around the city of Goma, was deteriorating very fast and the humanitarian situation was becoming dire. While pleased with the increase in the number of peacekeepers, he underlined the need for the political process to go forward. In that regard, he welcomed the appointment by the Secretary-General of Nigerian President Olusegun Obasanjo to assist in the process. He hoped the resolution would also serve to encourage the political process.

== See also ==
- List of United Nations Security Council Resolutions 1801 to 1900 (2008–2009)
