= United Nations Security Council Resolution 1841 =

UN Security Council Resolution 1841
- Date: 15 October 2008
- Meeting no.: 5,996
- Code: S/RES/1841 (Document)
- Subject: Reports of the Secretary-General on the Sudan
- Voting summary: 15 voted for; None voted against; None abstained
- Result: Adopted

Security Council composition
- Permanent members: China; France; Russia; United Kingdom; United States
- Non-permanent members: Burkina Faso; Belgium; Costa Rica; Croatia; Indonesia; Italy; Libya; Panama; South Africa; Vietnam

United Nations Security Council Resolution 1841 was unanimously adopted on 15 October 2008.

== Resolution ==
Demanding that parties in the conflict in the Darfur region of Sudan cease all military action, the Security Council today extended for one year the mandate of the Panel of Experts appointed to monitor the arms embargo there.

Acting under the binding Chapter VII of the United Nations Charter, the Council unanimously adopted resolution 1841 (2008), deciding to extend until 15 October 2009 the mandate of the four-member Panel originally appointed through resolution 1591 (2005).

By the text, the Council requested the Panel to issue three reports during the year. It also requested that the panel coordinate its activities with the United Nations–African Union hybrid peacekeeping force, known as UNAMID, as well as with international efforts to reach a political settlement in the conflict, in which at least 200,000 people have been killed and some 2 million displaced since fighting broke out in early 2003, pitting rebels against the Sudanese Government and its allied militias.

In its recent reports, the Panel noted violations of resolutions by rebels, militias and the Government, and said that the Government had used white aircraft in offensive overflights in Darfur, including in at least one instance a plane with “UN” markings. In the preamble of today’s resolution, the Council demanded that such practices cease.

In the resolutions that set up the sanctions, the Council called for all States to act to prevent the sale or supply of military equipment to belligerents and to inform the sanctions committee about individuals who impede the peace process, violate international law or are responsible for offensive military overflights.

== See also ==
- List of United Nations Security Council Resolutions 1801 to 1900 (2008–2009)
