= United Nations Security Council Resolution 1823 =

UN Security Council Resolution 1823
- Date: 10 July 2008
- Meeting no.: 5,931
- Code: S/RES/1823 (Document)
- Subject: The situation concerning Rwanda
- Voting summary: 15 voted for; None voted against; None abstained
- Result: Adopted

Security Council composition
- Permanent members: China; France; Russia; United Kingdom; United States
- Non-permanent members: Burkina Faso; Belgium; Costa Rica; Croatia; Indonesia; Italy; Libya; Panama; South Africa; Vietnam

United Nations Security Council Resolution 1823 was unanimously adopted on 10 July 2008.

== Resolution ==
Welcoming recent steps towards the restoration of peace and stability in the Great Lakes region, the Security Council this afternoon terminated several measures imposed in the wake of the devastating 1994 Rwanda genocide to prohibit the sale and supply of arms and related materiel for use in that country.

Acting under Chapter VII of the United Nations Charter, the Council unanimously adopted resolution 1823 (2008), by which it decided to terminate the prohibitions imposed by paragraphs 9 and 10 of resolution 1011 (1995). Paragraph 9 required “all States shall continue to prevent the sale or supply […] of arms and related materiel of all types, including weapons and ammunition, military vehicles and equipment, paramilitary police equipment and spare parts, to Rwanda, or to persons in the States neighbouring Rwanda if such sale or supply is for the purpose of the use of such arms or materiel within Rwanda, other than to the Government of Rwanda”.

Also terminated were the requirements of paragraph 10 of that resolution, which prohibited reselling, transferring or making available arms or related materiel for use by any neighbouring State or person not in the service of the Government of Rwanda. The council also decided to dissolve the committee established in 1994 to monitor the arms embargo concerning Rwanda.

By the text adopted today, the council, while stressing the need for States in the region to ensure that arms and related materiel delivered to them were not diverted or used by illegal armed groups, welcomed the entry into force of the region-wide Great Lakes Pact on Security, Stability and Development, which had been adopted last year at the Second Summit of the International Conference on the Great Lakes Region.

It also recalled the joint communiqué signed by the Democratic Republic of the Congo and Rwanda on 9 November 2007 and the outcome of the Conference for Peace, Security and Development in North and South Kivu, held in January 2008, which together “represent a major step towards the restoration of lasting peace and stability in the Great Lakes region”.

== See also ==
- List of United Nations Security Council Resolutions 1801 to 1900 (2008–2009)
