= United Nations Security Council Resolution 1854 =

UN Security Council Resolution 1854
- Date: 19 December 2008
- Meeting no.: 6,051
- Code: S/RES/1851 (Document)
- Subject: The situation in Liberia
- Voting summary: 15 voted for; None voted against; None abstained
- Result: Adopted

Security Council composition
- Permanent members: China; France; Russia; United Kingdom; United States
- Non-permanent members: Burkina Faso; Belgium; Costa Rica; Croatia; Indonesia; Italy; Libya; Panama; South Africa; Vietnam

United Nations Security Council Resolution 1854 was unanimously adopted on 19 December 2008.

== Resolution ==
Welcoming what it called the sustained progress made by the Government of Liberia in rebuilding the country for its citizens, the Security Council renewed restrictions imposed in 2003 on the import of arms and the travel of persons that had threatened the peace there for another 12 months.

Through the unanimous adoption of resolution 1854 (2008), the council also renewed until 20 December 2009 the mandate of the Expert Panel that helped monitor the implementation, violation and effectiveness of the sanctions, and requested the Secretary-General to reappoint its current members.

It encouraged the Government of Liberia to continue to cooperate with the Panel and to continue to implement the recommendations of the 2008 review team on the Kimberley Process, a mechanism established to keep “blood diamonds” from reaching world markets.

== See also ==
- List of United Nations Security Council Resolutions 1801 to 1900 (2008–2009)
