= United Nations Security Council Resolution 1818 =

UN Security Council Resolution 1818
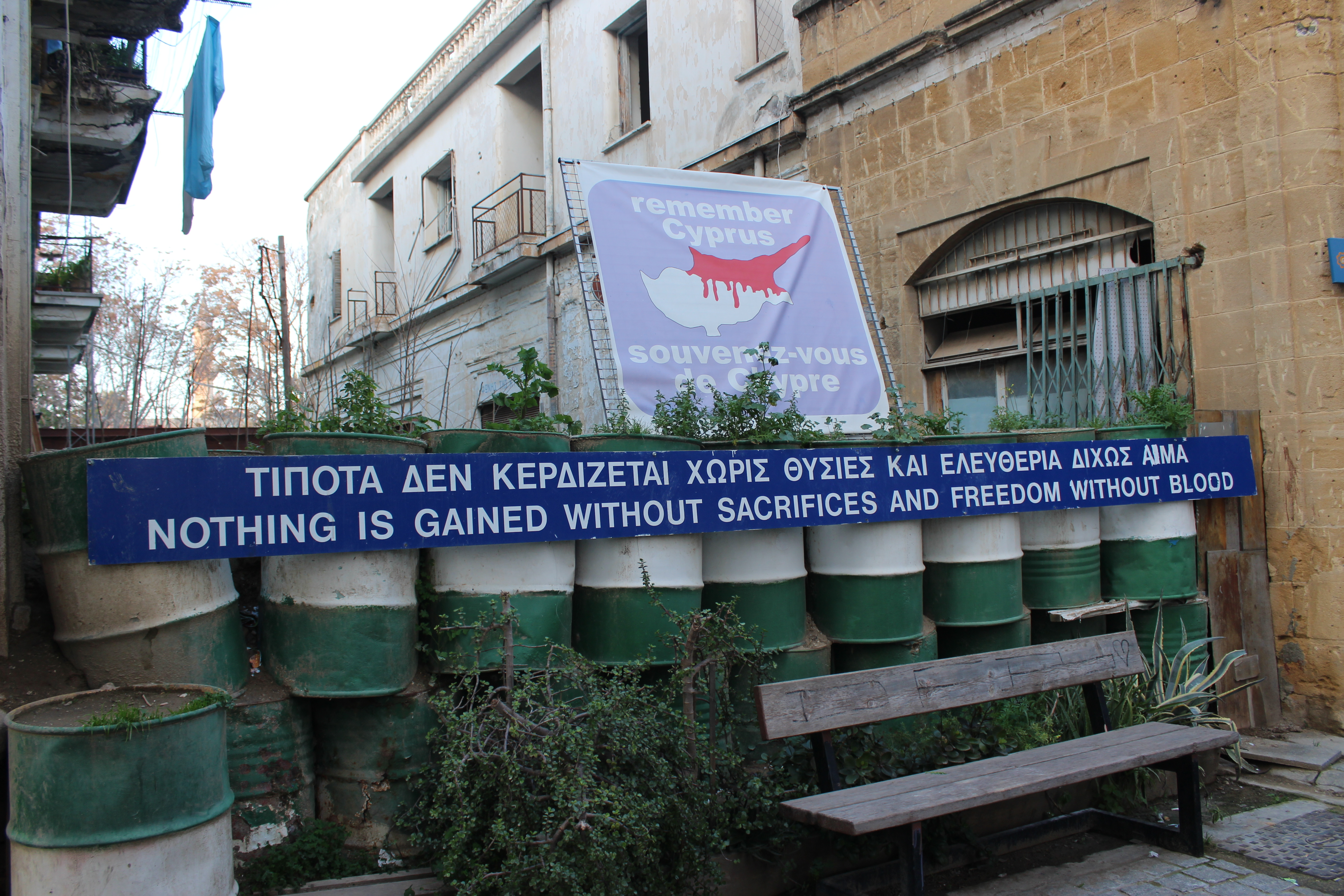
- Border barricade in Nicosia
- Date: 13 June 2008
- Meeting no.: 5,911
- Code: S/RES/1818 (Document)
- Subject: The situation in Cyprus
- Voting summary: 15 voted for; None voted against; None abstained
- Result: Adopted

Security Council composition
- Permanent members: China; France; Russia; United Kingdom; United States
- Non-permanent members: Burkina Faso; Belgium; Costa Rica; Croatia; Indonesia; Italy; Libya; Panama; South Africa; Vietnam

United Nations Security Council Resolution 1818 was unanimously adopted on 13 June 2008.

== Resolution ==
Extending for six months the mandate of the United Nations Peacekeeping Force in Cyprus, the Security Council today welcomed recent progress in the talks between representatives of the Greek Cypriot and the Turkish Cypriot sides, and called on the parties to use that momentum to make greater strides towards "full-fledged negotiations".

Unanimously adopting resolution 1818 (2008) to extend through 15 December the world body's 43-year-old Mission in Cyprus (UNFICYP), the Council welcomed the opening just two months ago of the Ledra Street crossing, "which has helped foster greater trust and interaction between the two communities". It also reaffirmed the importance of continued crossings of the Green Line by Cypriots, and encouraged the opening of other crossing points.

The resolution also welcomed the agreement between Greek and Turkish Cypriot leaders of 21 March, and the 23 May Joint Statement, which, among other things, demonstrated a renewed political willingness to support and engage fully and in good faith with the United Nations efforts; reaffirmed the commitment of the leaders to a bicommunal, bizonal federation with political equality, as set out in the relevant Security Council resolutions; and to consider further civilian and military confidence-building measures.

== See also ==
- List of United Nations Security Council Resolutions 1801 to 1900 (2008–2009)
