= United Nations Security Council Resolution 1881 =

UN Security Council Resolution 1881
- Date: 30 July 2009
- Meeting no.: 6,175
- Code: S/RES/1881 (Document)
- Subject: Reports of the Secretary-General on the Sudan
- Voting summary: 15 voted for; None voted against; None abstained
- Result: Adopted

Security Council composition
- Permanent members: China; France; Russia; United Kingdom; United States
- Non-permanent members: Austria; Burkina Faso; Costa Rica; Croatia; Japan; Libya; Mexico; Turkey; Uganda; Vietnam

United Nations Security Council Resolution 1881 was unanimously adopted on 30 July 2009.

== Resolution ==
The Security Council voted unanimously this morning to extend the mandate of the African Union-United Nations Hybrid Operation in Darfur (UNAMID) for one year, demanding that parties to the conflict in the western Sudanese province immediately put an end to the violence, including attacks on civilians, peacekeepers and humanitarian personnel.

Adopting resolution 1881 (2009), the Council called for an immediate cessation of hostilities and for all parties to commit to a sustained and permanent ceasefire. Requesting the Secretary-General to consult with the parties with a view to developing a more effective ceasefire-monitoring mechanism, it also underlined the need for UNAMID to report on instances of violence that could undermine peace efforts.

The Council reiterated that there could be no military solution to the conflict in Darfur, and that “an inclusive political settlement and the successful deployment of UNAMID are essential to re-establishing peace”. Attacks or threats against UNAMID were unacceptable, it added, reiterating its condemnation of previous attacks by armed groups and demanding that such attacks not recur.

Improvements in the Government of Sudan’s cooperation with UNAMID was welcomed, but the Council also called on that Government to comply with the status of forces agreement – reached in 2008 with UNAMID – particularly on the provision of visas for mission personnel and of flight and equipment clearances.

To measure and track UNAMID’s progress, the Council requested the Secretary-General submit for its consideration a strategic workplan with benchmarks. He was further requested to include, in his next report, an assessment of progress against those benchmarks, and any recommendations on the Operation’s mandate and configuration.

== See also ==
- List of United Nations Security Council Resolutions 1801 to 1900 (2008–2009)
