= United Nations Security Council Resolution 1832 =

UN Security Council Resolution 1832
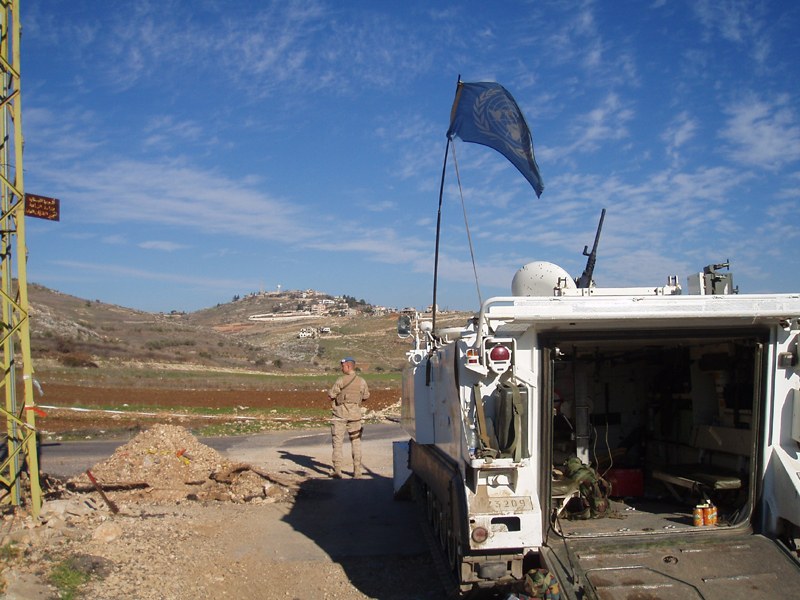
- UNIFIL patrol
- Date: 27 August 2008
- Meeting no.: 5,967
- Code: S/RES/1832 (Document)
- Subject: The situation in the Middle East
- Voting summary: 15 voted for; None voted against; None abstained
- Result: Adopted

Security Council composition
- Permanent members: China; France; Russia; United Kingdom; United States
- Non-permanent members: Burkina Faso; Belgium; Costa Rica; Croatia; Indonesia; Italy; Libya; Panama; South Africa; Vietnam

United Nations Security Council Resolution 1832 was unanimously adopted on 27 August 2008.

== Resolution ==
The Security Council this morning, determining that the situation in Lebanon continued to pose a threat to international peace and security, extended the mandate of the United Nations Interim Force in Lebanon (UNIFIL) until 31 August 2009.

Unanimously adopting resolution 1832 (2008), the Council commended the positive role of the mission, whose deployment, together with the Lebanese armed forces, had helped to establish a new strategic environment in southern Lebanon, and welcomed the expansion of coordinated activities between them.

The Council also called upon all parties concerned to respect the cessation of hostilities and the Blue Line in its entirety and to abide scrupulously by their obligations to respect the safety of UNIFIL and other United Nations personnel, including by avoiding any course of action that endangers those personnel and by ensuring the mission was accorded full freedom of movement within its area of operations.

The Council further called for full cooperation in achieving a permanent ceasefire and a long-term solution, as envisioned in resolution 1701 (2006), and requested the Secretary-General to continue to report on implementation of that resolution every four months, or at any time he deems appropriate.

The extension was requested in an 18 August letter to the Secretary-General from the Lebanese Prime Minister, and recommended in a subsequent 21 August letter to the Council from the Secretary-General.

Speaking after adoption of the text, Daniel Carmon, Israel’s representative, expressed appreciation for the difficult task of the UNIFIL troops on the ground and valued their work, which was fraught with growing complexity and challenges, especially in recent years. It had been more than two years since the adoption of resolution 1701, but the challenges to UNIFIL’s mandate were greater than ever in light of the presence and massive redeployment of armed Hizbullah elements, both north and south of the Litani River and the continuing transport of weapons from Iran and Syria in violation of Security Council resolutions. The recent report of the Secretary-General on implementation of resolution 1701 highlighted the challenges facing UNIFIL and clearly articulated several incidents involving hostile armed groups. Those incidents were only a sample of a large phenomenon of the danger to regional stability and threat to the safety of UNIFIL personnel.

He expected UNIFIL to take action in its area of operations to ensure that that area was not used for hostile activities of any kind. As everyone was witnessing, that was indeed a big challenge. The new policy guidelines of the Lebanese Government further complicated UNIFIL’s ability to fulfil its mandate and those complicated the core of resolution 1701 and raised concern about the commitment of the Lebanese Government to extending its authority over all Lebanese territory and ensuring that there would be no outside weapons and no outside interference on its territory. Resolution 1701 required the disarmament of all armed groups in Lebanon, but the new guidelines, in fact, were backing Hizbullah.

Nawaf Salam, Lebanon’s representative, said the Council’s decision was very important, as the second anniversary approached of the adoption of the resolution that had established UNIFIL. Evidence of Lebanon’s compliance was represented by such moves as deployment of the army to south Lebanon. The reports submitted to the Council were taken seriously by Lebanon. It was Israel who had not fully implemented the resolution, who continued to violate its terms and who persisted in refusing to cooperate with the United Nations on the matter of cluster bombs. The question of Sheba’a Farms also remained unresolved. Was there any doubt about which party was responsible for failure to achieve full implementation of the resolution? Newspapers contained reports of Israeli officials refusing to meet with Lebanon on matters such as border discussions. Israel had also issued threats against Lebanon. A letter had been sent to urge the Secretary-General to press Israel on meeting its obligations under resolution 1701 (2006).

== See also ==
- List of United Nations Security Council Resolutions 1801 to 1900 (2008–2009)
