= United Nations Security Council Resolution 1817 =

UN Security Council Resolution 1817
- Date: 11 June 2008
- Meeting no.: 5,907
- Code: S/RES/1817 (Document)
- Subject: The situation in Afghanistan
- Voting summary: 15 voted for; None voted against; None abstained
- Result: Adopted

Security Council composition
- Permanent members: China; France; Russia; United Kingdom; United States
- Non-permanent members: Burkina Faso; Belgium; Costa Rica; Croatia; Indonesia; Italy; Libya; Panama; South Africa; Vietnam

United Nations Security Council Resolution 1817 was unanimously adopted on 11 June 2008.

== Resolution ==
Expressing utmost concern at the widespread smuggling to and within Afghanistan of chemical compounds that are used illegally to refine heroin, the Security Council today called on all United Nations Member countries to help tighten international and regional controls on the manufacture and trade of chemical precursors, and prevent their diversion to illicit markets.

Unanimously adopting resolution 1817 (2008), the Security Council noted that most of the opium produced in Afghanistan was now processed inside the country, and called on all Member States to increase cooperation in monitoring international trade in chemical precursors, especially acetic anhydride, which is used legally by the pharmaceutical, textile and leather industries, but is also the essential precursor used for converting opium into morphine base and heroin.

Looking ahead to tomorrow's Paris international conference in support of Afghanistan, the resolution encouraged the expected participants in that event to “make concrete proposals” on how to address the problem of diversion of chemical precursors for illicit use, in the wider framework of discussions on strengthening counter-narcotics activities in the Afghanistan National Development Strategy and National Drug Control Strategy.

The resolution also stressed the importance of a comprehensive approach to Afghanistan's drug problem, and invited Member States, particularly Afghanistan and its precursor-producing neighbouring countries and all countries on the trafficking routes, to fully comply with relevant provisions of the United Nations Convention against Illicit Traffic in Narcotic Drugs and Psychotropic Substances, in order to close the loopholes used by criminal networks to divert chemical precursors from licit international trade.

Urging both importing and exporting States to strengthen their regulation and monitoring of the movement of precursors, the Security Council invited the international community to provide Afghanistan with financial and technical support to build its national capacity in those areas. It stressed the importance of training and equipping law enforcement agencies, including border police and customs officers, so they could deal efficiently with tasks such as detection, scanning, stockpiling, transportation and destruction of chemical precursors.

Speaking after the unanimous vote, Jean-Pierre Lacroix of France, one of the text's main sponsors, welcomed the move, saying that his country stood firmly behind Afghanistan's efforts to combat drug trafficking and improve stability throughout the country. Tomorrow's landmark Paris donors’ conference, in support of Afghanistan's development and reconstruction, would give the wider international community the opportunity to reaffirm its commitment to cooperation.

== See also ==
- List of United Nations Security Council Resolutions 1801 to 1900 (2008–2009)
