= United Nations Security Council Resolution 1873 =

UN Security Council Resolution 1873
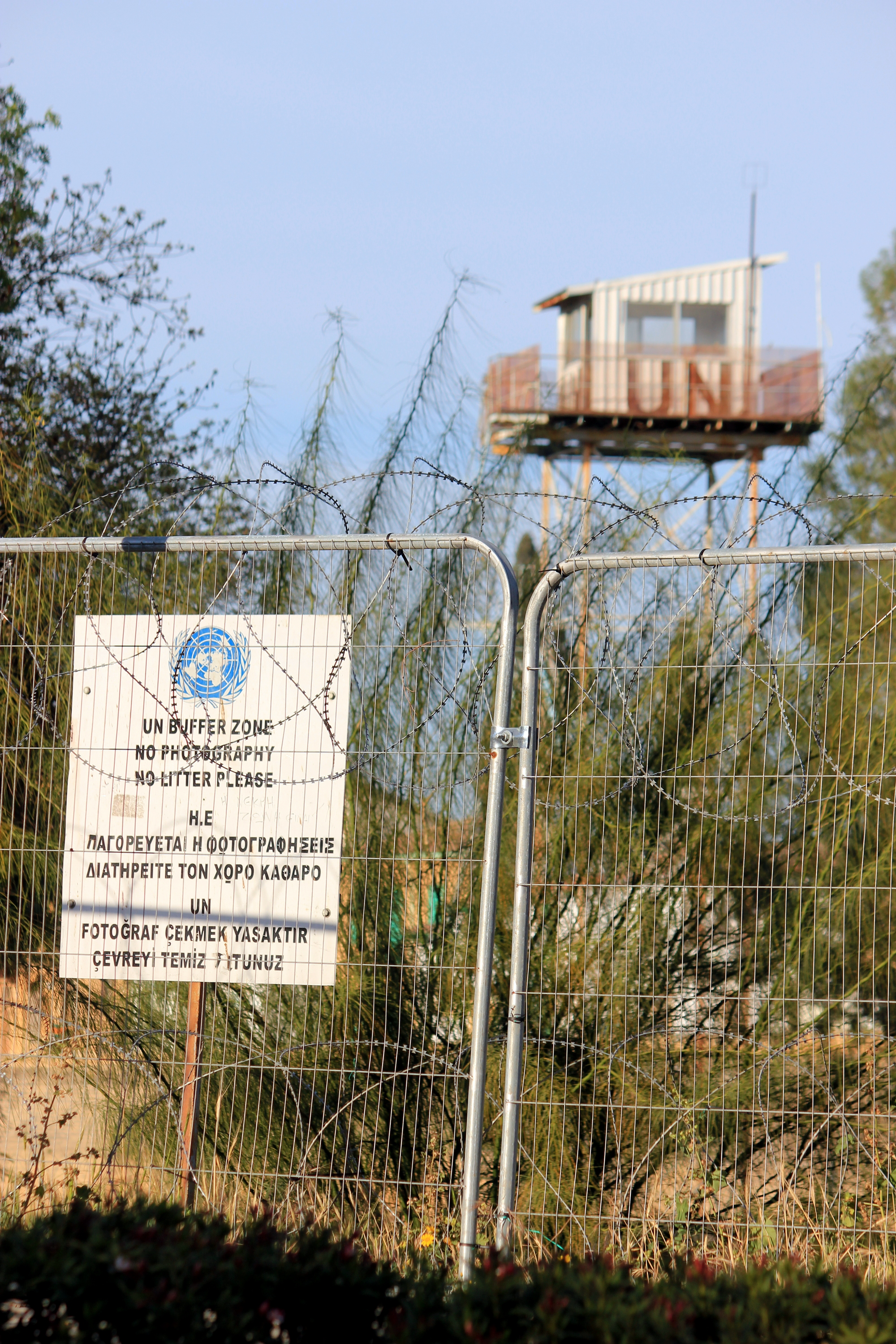
- UN buffer zone in Nicosia
- Date: 29 May 2009
- Meeting no.: 6,132
- Code: S/RES/1873 (Document)
- Subject: The situation in Cyprus
- Voting summary: 14 voted for; 1 voted against; None abstained
- Result: Adopted

Security Council composition
- Permanent members: China; France; Russia; United Kingdom; United States
- Non-permanent members: Austria; Burkina Faso; Costa Rica; Croatia; Japan; Libya; Mexico; Turkey; Uganda; Vietnam

United Nations Security Council Resolution 1873 was adopted on 29 May 2009.

== Resolution ==
Strongly urging the Greek Cypriot and Turkish Cypriot leaders to increase the momentum in the United Nations-backed talks aimed at reunifying the divided island nation, the Security Council today extended through mid-December the world body's long-running peacekeeping operation in Cyprus.

By a vote of 14 in favour to 1 against (Turkey), the Council adopted resolution 1873 (2009), which stressed that there now existed a "rare opportunity to make decisive progress", and reaffirmed the primary role of the United Nations in assisting the parties to bring the Cyprus conflict and the division of the island nation to a comprehensive and durable settlement.

Explaining his negative vote, the representative of non-permanent member Turkey reminded the Council that since 1963, there had not been a joint and constitutional Government representing the whole of Cyprus either legally or functionally. The two peoples had been living separately under their own administrations.

He said that resolution 186 (1964), which had initially set up the United Nations Peacekeeping Force in Cyprus (UNFICYP), "following the Greek Cypriot armed offensive against the Turkish Cypriots", had not been accepted by the Turkish Cypriot side or by Turkey. That text, as well as the council's subsequent decisions, referred to "the Government of Cyprus", which had, in fact, been representing only Greek Cypriots since 1963. Furthermore, UNFICYP should have functioned with the open consent of both sides.

That "wrong approach" ‑‑ to consider that administration the sole Government in Cyprus ‑‑ had unfortunately been the sole obstacle to finding a comprehensive and durable solution for the past 45 years, he said. Turkey had never been against the intent behind establishing UNFICYP but it had misgivings about the manner in which the resolutions had been adopted and the language contained in them. Indeed, the Force had long functioned in the northern part of the island with the active participation of the Turkish side. It was for "these stated reasons of principle" that Turkey had voted against the resolution. As ever, Turkey continued to look forward to the day when a durable solution could be reached on the basis of partnership and a bizonal, bicommunal federation.

== See also ==
- List of United Nations Security Council Resolutions 1801 to 1900 (2008–2009)
