= United Nations Security Council Resolution 1852 =

UN Security Council Resolution 1852
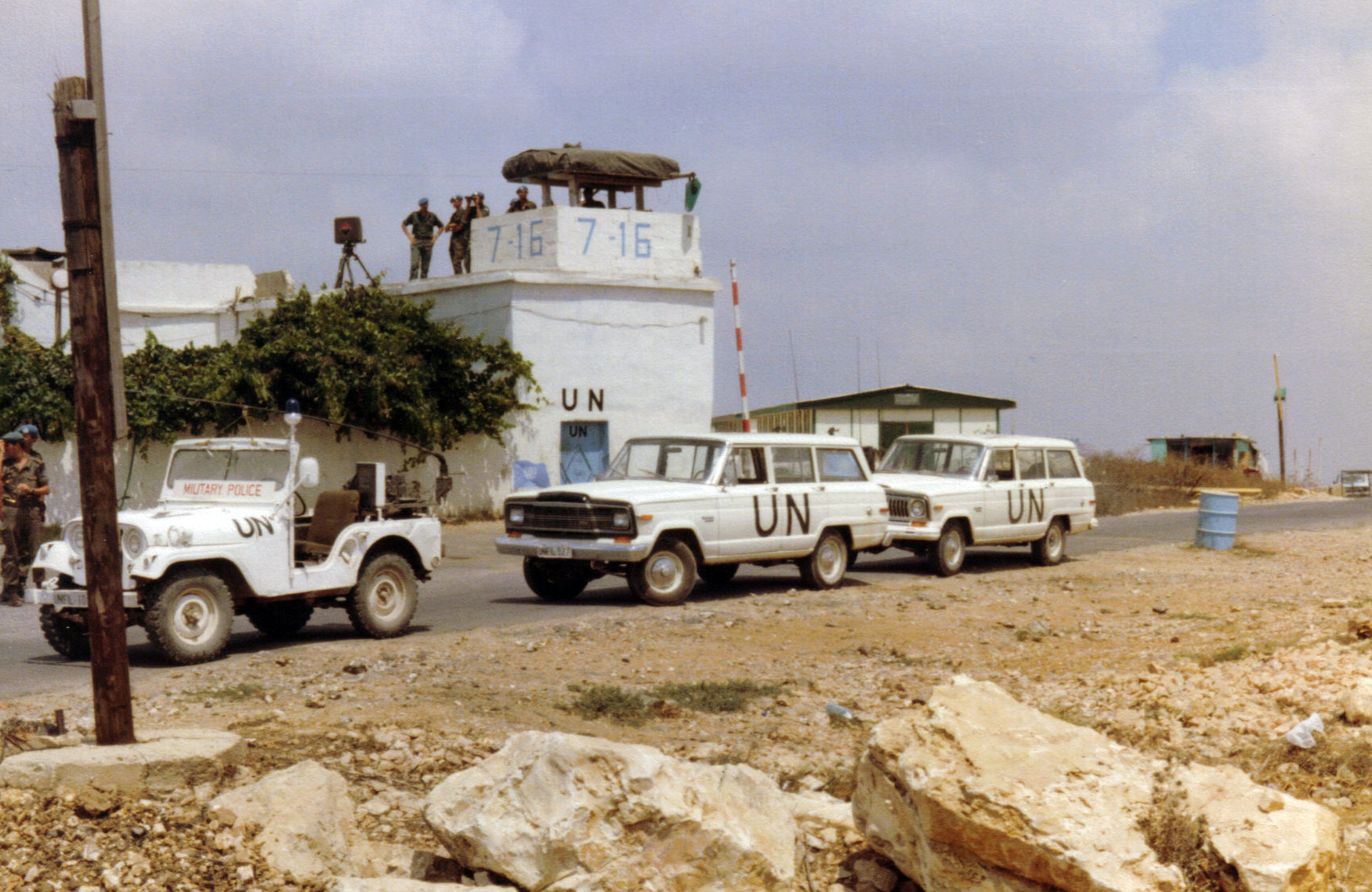
- UNIFIL vehicles
- Date: 17 December 2008
- Meeting no.: 6,048
- Code: S/RES/1852 (Document)
- Subject: The situation in The Middle East
- Voting summary: 15 voted for; None voted against; None abstained
- Result: Adopted

Security Council composition
- Permanent members: China; France; Russia; United Kingdom; United States
- Non-permanent members: Burkina Faso; Belgium; Costa Rica; Croatia; Indonesia; Italy; Libya; Panama; South Africa; Vietnam

United Nations Security Council Resolution 1852 was unanimously adopted on 17 December 2008.

== Resolution ==
The Security Council today extended until 28 February 2009 the mandate of the International Independent Investigation Commission in Beirut probing the terrorist bombing that killed former Lebanese Prime Minister Rafiq Hariri and others on 14 February 2005.

Unanimously adopting the French-sponsored resolution 1852 (2008), the Council took note of the commission's request for an extension that would allow it to continue its investigation without interruption and gradually transfer its operations, staff and assets to The Hague with a view to completing the transition in time for the Special Tribunal for Lebanon to start functioning.

(The commission was established on 7 April 2007 by consensus resolution 1595, with the approval of the Government of Lebanon, to investigate all aspects of the deadly attack. See Press Release SC/8353 for details.)

On 30 May 2007, the council, in a divided vote, adopted resolution 1757 authorizing the Special Tribunal to try suspects. On 21 December, the United Nations and the Netherlands signed a Headquarters agreement to base the Special Tribunal's seat in that country. (See Press Release SC/9029.)

Briefing the Council in an earlier meeting today, Daniel Bellemare, Commissioner of the International Independent Investigation Commission, indicated that the investigation would continue even after the Special Tribunal was up and running on 1 March 2009. “Fast food justice is not on the menu. And, let me be clear, there will be no indictment of convenience.”

Mr. Bellemare appealed to the council for the two-month extension this morning, saying it would allow the investigation to maintain its momentum. Rather than have a two-month gap between the end of the commission's activities and the start of the Tribunal's, the investigation could continue as seamlessly as possible. The extension would also provide a period of time in which the commission could gradually transfer its investigative operations from Beirut to The Hague, while remaining operational.

== See also ==
- List of United Nations Security Council Resolutions 1801 to 1900 (2008–2009)
