= United Nations Security Council Resolution 1847 =

UN Security Council Resolution 1847
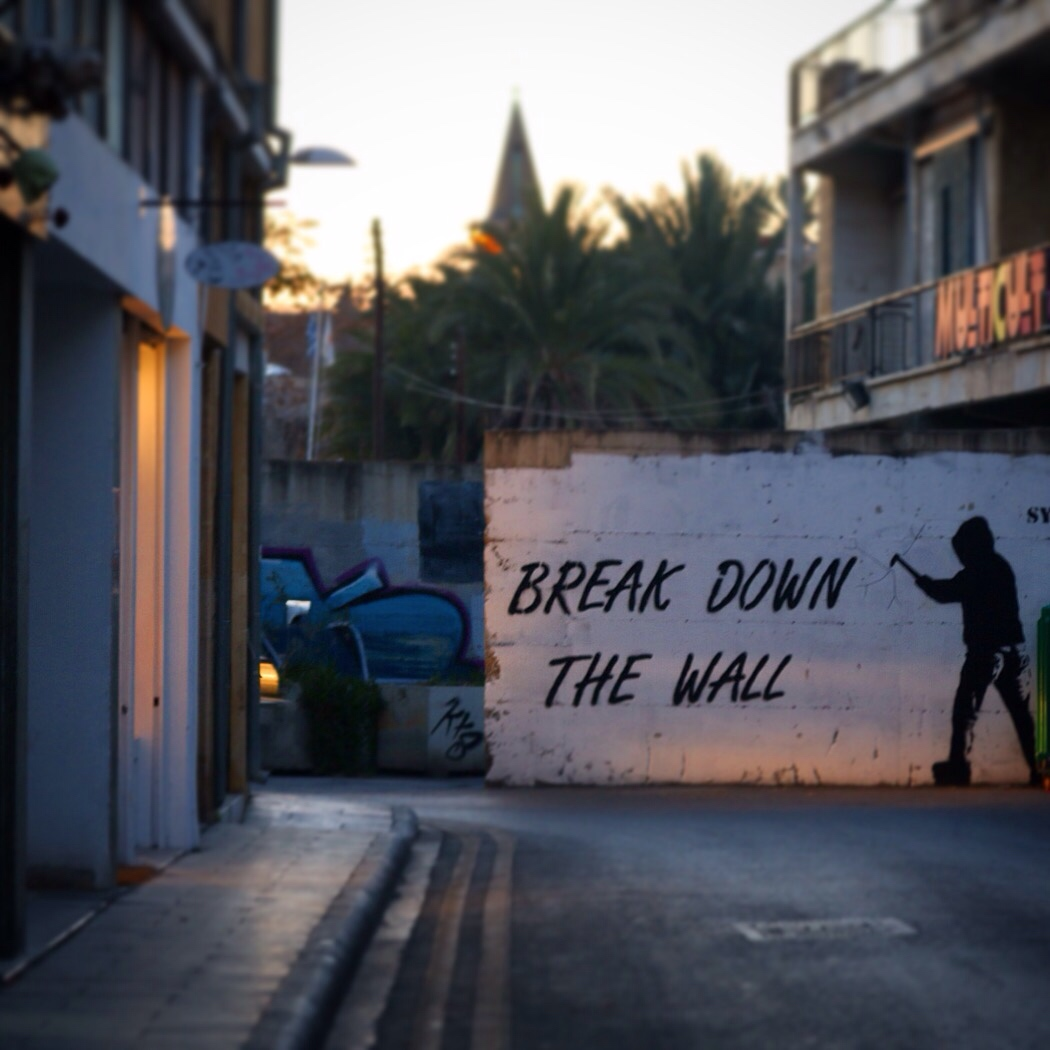
- Border wall in Nicosia
- Date: 12 December 2008
- Meeting no.: 6,038
- Code: S/RES/1847 (Document)
- Subject: The situation in Cyprus
- Voting summary: 15 voted for; None voted against; None abstained
- Result: Adopted

Security Council composition
- Permanent members: China; France; Russia; United Kingdom; United States
- Non-permanent members: Burkina Faso; Belgium; Costa Rica; Croatia; Indonesia; Italy; Libya; Panama; South Africa; Vietnam

United Nations Security Council Resolution 1847 was unanimously adopted on 12 December 2008.

== Resolution ==
Expressing its full support for the United Nations Peacekeeping Force in Cyprus (UNFICYP), the Security Council this morning decided to extend the mission's mandate until 15 June 2009.

Unanimously adopting resolution 1847 (2008) and acting under Chapter VII of the United Nations Charter, the Council welcomed the launch of fully fledged negotiations on 3 September and the prospect of a comprehensive and durable settlement it had created, and urged full exploitation of that opportunity, preserving the current atmosphere of trust and goodwill.

By the resolution's provisions, the Council called on both sides to continue to engage, as a matter of urgency and in consultation with UNFICYP, on the demarcation of the buffer zone and called on the Turkish Cypriot side and Turkish forces to restore in Strovilia the military status quo which had existed there prior to 30 June 2000.

== See also ==
- List of United Nations Security Council Resolutions 1801 to 1900 (2008–2009)
