= United Nations Security Council Resolution 1848 =

UN Security Council Resolution 1848
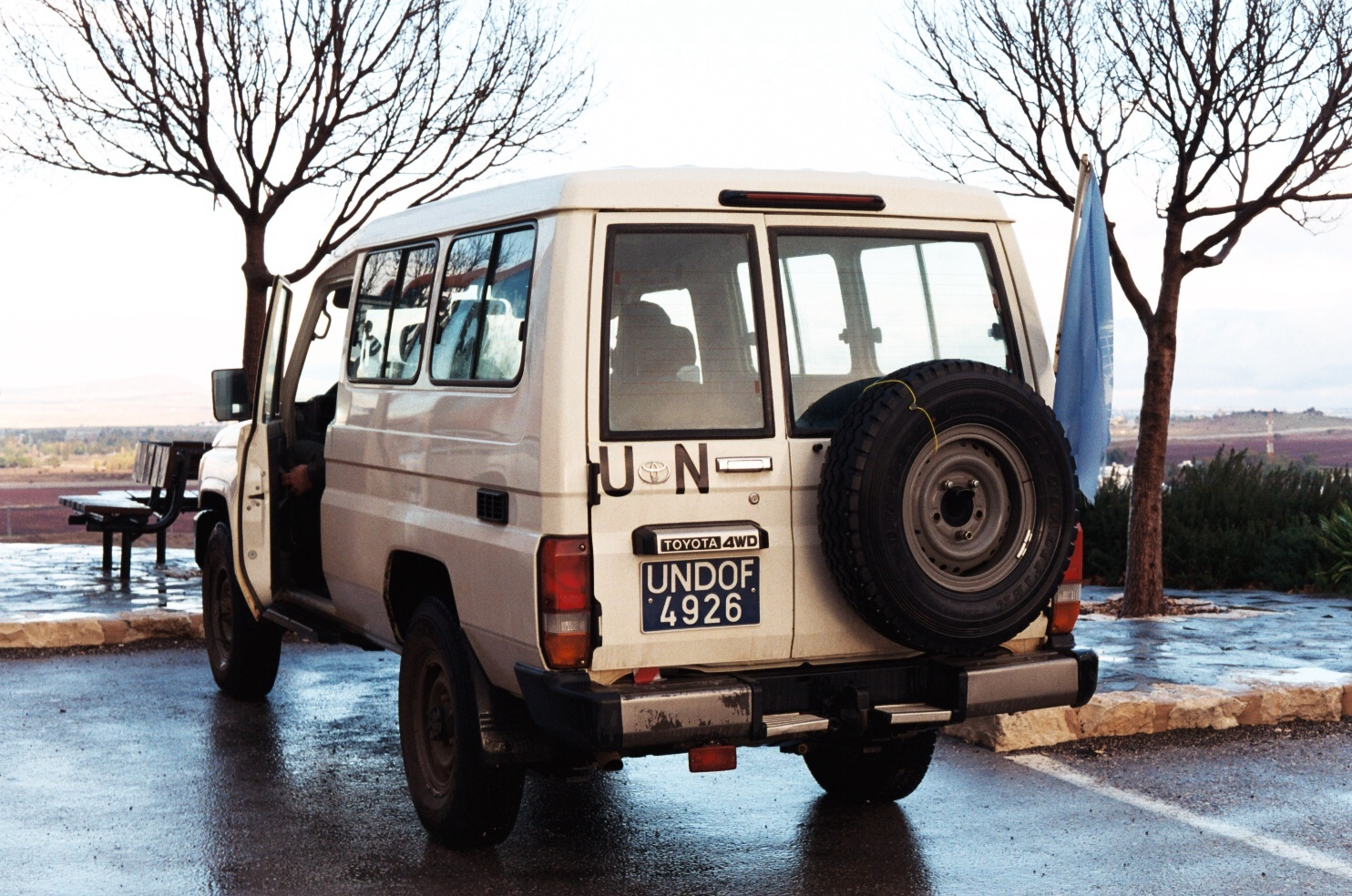
- UNDOF vehicle
- Date: 12 December 2008
- Meeting no.: 6,039
- Code: S/RES/1848 (Document)
- Subject: The situation in the Middle East
- Voting summary: 15 voted for; None voted against; None abstained
- Result: Adopted

Security Council composition
- Permanent members: China; France; Russia; United Kingdom; United States
- Non-permanent members: Burkina Faso; Belgium; Costa Rica; Croatia; Indonesia; Italy; Libya; Panama; South Africa; Vietnam

United Nations Security Council Resolution 1848 was unanimously adopted on 12 December 2008.

== Resolution ==
The Security Council this morning renewed the mandate of the United Nations Disengagement Observer Force (UNDOF), which has supervised the ceasefire between Israel and Syria since 1974, for the six months ending 30 June 2009.

Unanimously adopting resolution 1848 (2008), the Council also called for the implementation of its resolution 338 of 1973, which required immediate negotiations between the parties with the aim of establishing a just and lasting peace in the Middle East.

In conjunction with the adoption of today’s resolution, a statement was also read out by Neven Jurica of Croatia, which holds the rotating presidency of the Council for December, reiterating that tension would remain until such a just and lasting peace in the region could be reached (to be issued as document S/PRST/2008/46).

In his latest report on UNDOF (see document S/2008/737), Secretary-General Ban Ki-moon recommended the extension of the Force, noting that, while the situation in the Golan Heights has been “generally quiet” and Israel and Syria had even conducted indirect peace talks, the overall region remains tense. Mr. Ban also drew attention to $23.7 million in unpaid assessments for UNDOF’s funding.

== See also ==
- List of United Nations Security Council Resolutions 1801 to 1900 (2008–2009)
