= United Nations Security Council Resolution 1866 =

UN Security Council Resolution 1866
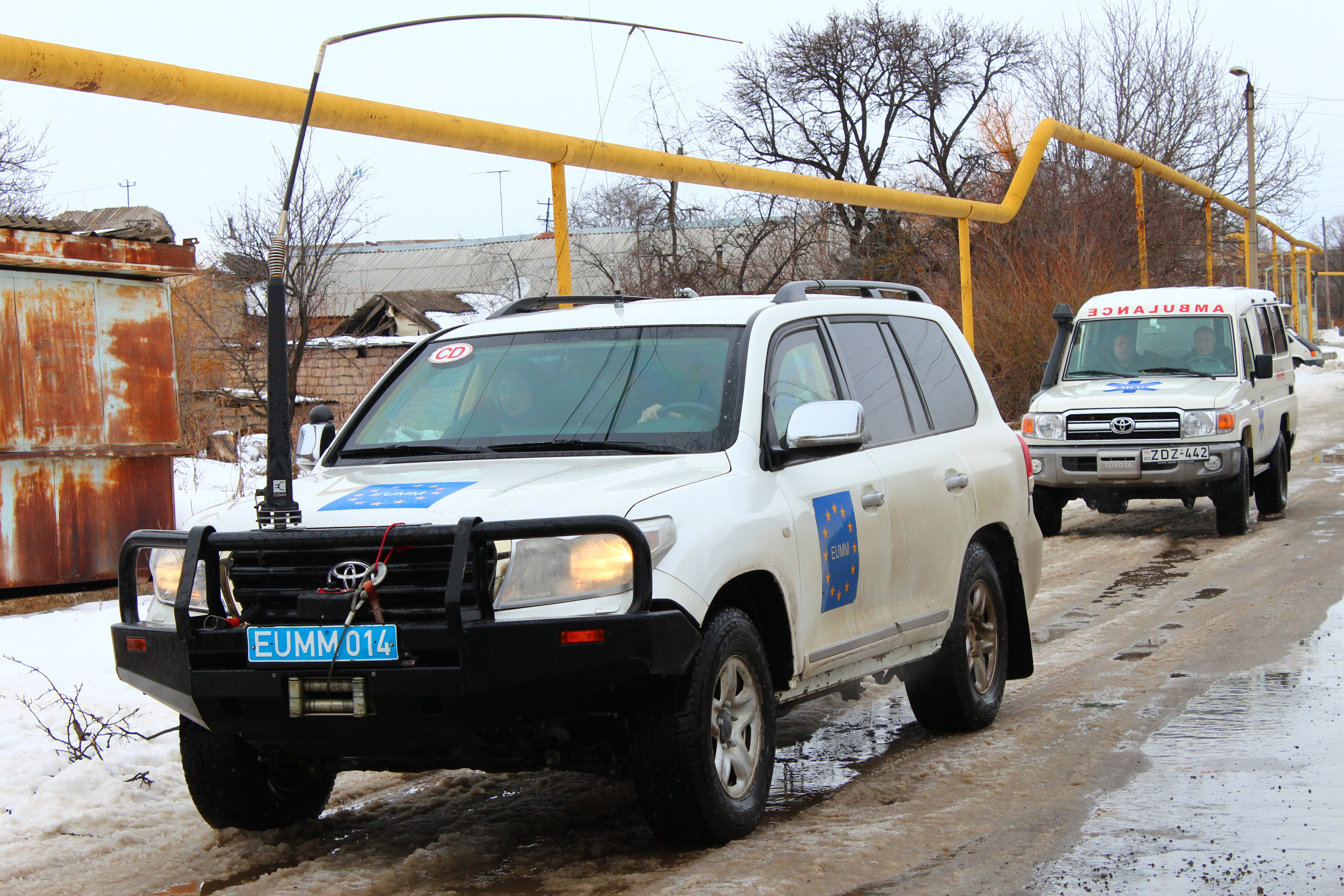
- European Union Monitoring Mission in Georgia
- Date: 13 February 2009
- Meeting no.: 6,082
- Code: S/RES/1866 (Document)
- Subject: The situation in Georgia
- Voting summary: 15 voted for; None voted against; None abstained
- Result: Adopted

Security Council composition
- Permanent members: China; France; Russia; United Kingdom; United States
- Non-permanent members: Austria; Burkina Faso; Costa Rica; Croatia; Japan; Libya; Mexico; Turkey; Uganda; Vietnam

United Nations Security Council Resolution 1866 was unanimously adopted on 13 February 2009.

== Resolution ==
This is the resolution:

The Security Council this morning decided to extend the mandate of the current United Nations Observer Mission in Georgia (UNOMIG) until 15 June, while expressing its intention to outline by that time the elements of a future United Nations presence in the region.

By the terms of resolution 1866 (2009), adopted unanimously today, the Council called for the provisions set out in paragraph 2(a) of the 1994 Agreement on a Ceasefire and Separation of Forces, signed in Moscow, to be respected, pending consultations and agreement on a revised security regime, while taking note of recommendations on the security regime contained in the latest report of the United Nations Secretary-General on the situation in Abkhazia, Georgia (document S/2009/69).

In his report, the Secretary-General suggests that an effective security regime should include, among other things: strict observation of the ceasefire on land, at sea and in the air; a “security zone” on both sides of the ceasefire line where the presence of armed forces and equipment will not be allowed; a ban on overflights by military aircraft and unmanned aerial vehicles in that and additional zones; and designation by each party of authorized representatives who would liaise with a view to exchanging information, preventing tensions and resolving incidents.

In its resolution today, the Council underlined the need to refrain from the use of force or from any act of ethnic discrimination against persons, groups or institutions, and to ensure, without distinction, the security of persons, their right to freedom of movement and the protection of the property of refugees and displaced persons. It also called for facilitation ‑- and refraining from placing any impediment to ‑- humanitarian assistance to those affected by the conflict, including refugees and internally displaced persons, as well as efforts to facilitate their voluntary, safe, dignified and unhindered return.

The Council also called for intensification of efforts to address the issue of regional security and stability, and the issue of refugees and internally displaced persons, through the discussions currently under way in Geneva. It also requests the Secretary-General to report by 15 May on implementation of the resolution, the situation on the ground and any recommendations on future activities.

== See also ==
- List of United Nations Security Council Resolutions 1801 to 1900 (2008–2009)
