= United Nations Security Council Resolution 1809 =

UN Security Council Resolution 1809
- Date: 16 April 2008
- Meeting no.: 5,868
- Code: S/RES/1809 (Document)
- Subject: Peace and security in Africa
- Voting summary: 15 voted for; None voted against; None abstained
- Result: Adopted

Security Council composition
- Permanent members: China; France; Russia; United Kingdom; United States
- Non-permanent members: Burkina Faso; Belgium; Costa Rica; Croatia; Indonesia; Italy; Libya; Panama; South Africa; Vietnam

United Nations Security Council Resolution 1809 was unanimously adopted on 16 April 2008.

== Resolution ==
A high-level Security Council debate involving a broad range of African leaders and focused on Africa’s new continental peace and security architecture culminated today in the Council’s recognition of the need to enhance the predictability, sustainability and flexibility of financing regional organizations’ peacekeeping operations under a United Nations mandate and endorsement of the Secretary-General’s proposal to set up within three months an African Union – United Nations panel to consider the modalities of such support.

Unanimously adopting resolution 1809 (2008), the Council stressed the utility of effective partnerships between the United Nations and regional organizations, particularly the African Union, in order to enable early responses to emerging crises in Africa, and expressed its determination to enhance that relationship.

The Council also encouraged the ongoing efforts of the African Union and the subregional organizations to strengthen their peacekeeping capacity and to undertake peacekeeping operations in the continent and to coordinate with the United Nations, as well as ongoing efforts to develop a continental early warning system, such as the African standby force and enhanced mediation capacity.

Recognizing that regional organizations were well positioned to understand the root causes of armed conflicts, the Council also encouraged those organizations’ continuing involvement in the peaceful settlement of disputes, including through conflict prevention, confidence-building and mediation.

Prior to adoption of the resolution, Secretary-General Ban Ki-moon told the meeting that, in consolidating the partnership between the African Union and the United Nations, he would spare no effort in making it complementary, effective and inclusive. “I am resolved to enhance cooperation with all regional organizations, so as to create, in the future, effective mechanisms for conflict prevention and resolution, as well as a predictable, interlinked and reliable system for global peacekeeping under the Charter,” he said.

== See also ==
- List of United Nations Security Council Resolutions 1801 to 1900 (2008–2009)
