= United Nations Security Council Resolution 1831 =

UN Security Council Resolution 1831
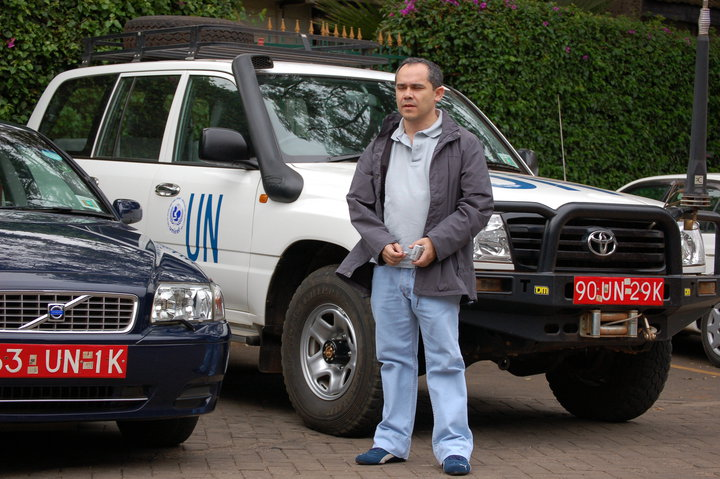
- UN vehicle
- Date: 19 August 2008
- Meeting no.: 5,957
- Code: S/RES/1831 (Document)
- Subject: The situation in Somalia
- Voting summary: 15 voted for; None voted against; None abstained
- Result: Adopted

Security Council composition
- Permanent members: China; France; Russia; United Kingdom; United States
- Non-permanent members: Burkina Faso; Belgium; Costa Rica; Croatia; Indonesia; Italy; Libya; Panama; South Africa; Vietnam

United Nations Security Council Resolution 1831 was unanimously adopted on 19 August 2008.

== Resolution ==
The Security Council this morning renewed its authorization of the African Union Mission in Somalia (AMISOM) for a further period of six months.

Unanimously adopting resolution 1831 (2008) under the Charter’s Chapter VII, the Council authorized the Mission to take all necessary measures, as appropriate, to carry out its mandate, as set out in resolution 1772 (2007), underlining, in particular, that the Mission could take all necessary measures, as appropriate, to provide security for key infrastructure and to contribute to the creation of security conditions for the provision of humanitarian assistance. (See Press Release SC/9101)

Further to the text, the Council urged Member States to provide financial resources, personnel, equipment and services for AMISOM’s full deployment.

The Council encouraged the Secretary-General to continue to explore with the African Union Commission Chairperson, in coordination with donors, ways of strengthening United Nations logistical, political and technical support for the African Union, building the Union’s capacity to carry out its commitments towards supporting AMISOM, and assisting AMISOM’s full deployment, to the extent possible, with the goal of achieving United Nations standards.

In the preambular portion of today’s resolution, the Council welcomed the signature on 19 August of the agreement between the Transitional Federal Government of Somalia and the Alliance of the Re-Liberation of Somalia, and noted that it calls for the United Nations “to authorize and deploy an international stabilization force from countries that are friends of Somalia, excluding neighbouring countries”.

== See also ==
- List of United Nations Security Council Resolutions 1801 to 1900 (2008–2009)
