= United Nations Security Council Resolution 1856 =

UN Security Council Resolution 1856
- Date: 22 December 2008
- Meeting no.: 6,055
- Code: S/RES/1856 (Document)
- Subject: The situation concerning the Democratic Republic of the Congo
- Voting summary: 15 voted for; None voted against; None abstained
- Result: Adopted

Security Council composition
- Permanent members: China; France; Russia; United Kingdom; United States
- Non-permanent members: Burkina Faso; Belgium; Costa Rica; Croatia; Indonesia; Italy; Libya; Panama; South Africa; Vietnam

United Nations Security Council Resolution 1856 was unanimously adopted on 22 December 2008.

== Resolution ==
The Security Council this morning extended the United Nations Mission in the Democratic Republic of the Congo (MONUC) for another year, while reinforcing its strength and refocusing its mandate more sharply on the protection of civilians tormented by violence in the still-embattled eastern provinces.

Through the unanimous adoption of resolution 1856 (2008), the 15-member body authorized deployment of up to 19,815 military personnel, 760 military observers, 391 police and 1,050 personnel of formed police units in the vast central African country through the end of 2009.

The Council underscored the importance of using “all necessary means” at its disposal, including robust rules of engagement, to ensure the protection of not only civilians, but also humanitarian personnel and United Nations staff and facilities.

Condemning repeated offensives of the Congres national pour la Défense du peuple (CNDP) in North Kivu, the attacks by the Lord’s Resistance Army (LRA) in Orientale Province and hostilities by illegal armed groups in Ituri, the body called on all armed groups to immediately lay down their arms and present themselves without any preconditions to Congolese authorities and MONUC for disarmament, repatriation, resettlement and/or reintegration as appropriate.

== See also ==
- List of United Nations Security Council Resolutions 1801 to 1900 (2008–2009)
