= United Nations Security Council Resolution 1895 =

UN Security Council Resolution 1895
- Date: 18 November 2009
- Meeting no.: 6,220
- Code: S/RES/1895 (Document)
- Subject: The situation in Bosnia and Herzegovina
- Voting summary: 15 voted for; None voted against; None abstained
- Result: Adopted

Security Council composition
- Permanent members: China; France; Russia; United Kingdom; United States
- Non-permanent members: Austria; Burkina Faso; Costa Rica; Croatia; Japan; Libya; Mexico; Turkey; Uganda; Vietnam

United Nations Security Council Resolution 1895 was unanimously adopted on 18 November 2009.

== Resolution ==
The Security Council this morning authorized for another year, until 18 November 2010, the European Union Stabilization Force (EUFOR) mandated to ensure continued compliance with the Dayton Peace Agreement that ended fighting in Bosnia and Herzegovina in 1995.

Unanimously adopting resolution 1895 (2009), the Council also welcomed the decision to maintain in the country a headquarters of the North Atlantic Treaty Organization (NATO), which led the multinational stabilization force (SFOR) that handed over peacekeeping responsibilities to EUFOR in 2004, recognizing the right of both organizations to take all necessary measures to defend themselves from attacks or threats.

The Council reiterated that the primary responsibility for the further implementation of the Peace Agreement lay with the Bosnian authorities. Their compliance –- in particular full cooperation with the International Tribunal for the Former Yugoslavia – would determine the continued willingness of the international community and major donors to provide support, the resolution said.

The Council also emphasized its full support for the High Representative in monitoring implementation of the Peace Agreement and recognized that he is the final authority in theatre regarding the interpretation of civilian implementation of the Agreement.

== See also ==
- List of United Nations Security Council Resolutions 1801 to 1900 (2008–2009)
