= United Nations Security Council Resolution 1891 =

UN Security Council Resolution 1891
- Date: 13 October 2009
- Meeting no.: 6,199
- Code: S/RES/1891 (Document)
- Subject: Reports of the Secretary-General on the Sudan
- Voting summary: 15 voted for; None voted against; None abstained
- Result: Adopted

Security Council composition
- Permanent members: China; France; Russia; United Kingdom; United States
- Non-permanent members: Austria; Burkina Faso; Costa Rica; Croatia; Japan; Libya; Mexico; Turkey; Uganda; Vietnam

United Nations Security Council Resolution 1891 was unanimously adopted on 13 October 2009.

== Resolution ==
The resolution stressed the Security Council's continuing commitment to peace throughout Sudan, including the still-violent Western Darfur region. It extended the mandate of the Panel of Experts, which helped monitor the arms embargo and sanctions on those impeding peace in the country, until 15 October 2010.

Through the resolution, the Council also urged all states and other interested parties to supply information on the implementation of the embargo and the sanctions, which included a travel ban and asset freeze on targeted individuals and organizations. It requested the Panel to coordinate its activities with the operations of the African Union-United Nations Hybrid Operation in Darfur (UNAMID) and to assess progress towards removing impediments to the political process, threats to stability and violations of Security Council resolutions.

== See also ==
- List of United Nations Security Council Resolutions 1801 to 1900 (2008–2009)
