= United Nations Security Council Resolution 1872 =

UN Security Council Resolution 1872
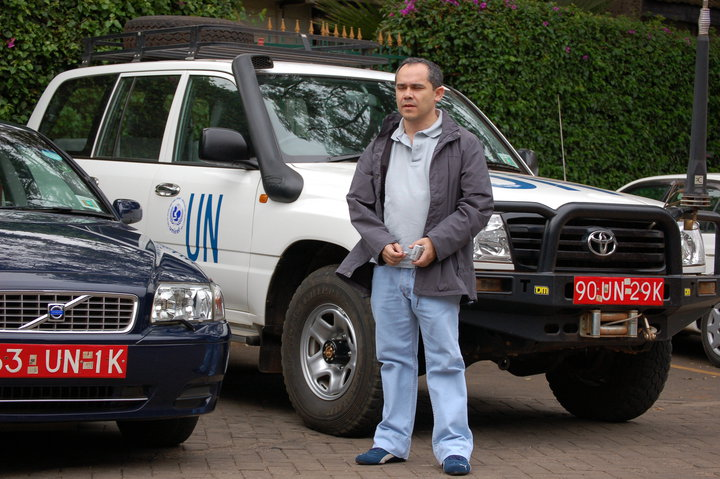
- UN vehicle
- Date: 26 May 2009
- Meeting no.: 6,127
- Code: S/RES/1872 (Document)
- Subject: The situation in Somalia
- Voting summary: 15 voted for; None voted against; None abstained
- Result: Adopted

Security Council composition
- Permanent members: China; France; Russia; United Kingdom; United States
- Non-permanent members: Austria; Burkina Faso; Costa Rica; Croatia; Japan; Libya; Mexico; Turkey; Uganda; Vietnam

United Nations Security Council Resolution 1872 was unanimously adopted on 26 May 2009.

== Resolution ==
Condemning the recent resurgence in fighting in Somalia, the Security Council today authorized the African Union Mission in Somalia (AMISOM) peacekeeping force there to maintain its existing mandate until 31 January 2010.

Unanimously adopting resolution 1872 (2009) under Chapter VII of the United Nations Charter, the Council called on all Somali parties to support the recent Djibouti Agreement on national reconciliation, and welcomed in that regard President Sheikh Sharif Sheikh Ahmed’s call for all opposition groups to support that process.

The Council urged Member States, as well as regional and international organizations, to contribute generously to the United Nations Trust Fund for AMISOM, while noting that the Trust Fund’s existence did not preclude direct bilateral arrangements in support of the Mission. It also urged the international community to contribute generously to the corresponding Trust Fund for Somali security institutions, and to offer technical assistance for the training and equipping of the country’s security forces.

Following the vote, Uganda’s representative, speaking on behalf of the African Union, said the regional organization would like to see the Council take even stronger action against those elements in Somalia opposing reconciliation, and pledged continued African Union support for that goal.

== See also ==
- List of United Nations Security Council Resolutions 1801 to 1900 (2008–2009)
