= United Nations Security Council Resolution 1805 =

UN Security Council Resolution 1805
- Date: 20 March 2008
- Meeting no.: 5,856
- Code: S/RES/1805 (Document)
- Subject: Threats to international peace and security caused by terrorist acts
- Voting summary: 15 voted for; None voted against; None abstained
- Result: Adopted

Security Council composition
- Permanent members: China; France; Russia; United Kingdom; United States
- Non-permanent members: Burkina Faso; Belgium; Costa Rica; Croatia; Indonesia; Italy; Libya; Panama; South Africa; Vietnam

United Nations Security Council Resolution 1805 was unanimously adopted on 20 March 2008.

== Resolution ==
In the wake of yesterday’s open debate on threats to international peace and security, with its focus on the Counter-Terrorism Committee’s Executive Directorate (CTED), the Security Council today extended the Directorate’s mandate until 31 December 2010, agreeing to conduct an interim review by 30 June 2009 and a comprehensive look at its work prior to the mandate’s expiration. (For more information, see Press Release SC/9279.)

Unanimously adopting resolution 1805 (2008), which underlined that the overarching goal of the Counter-Terrorism Committee was to ensure the full implementation of resolution 1373 (2001), the Council urged CTED to strengthen its role in facilitating technical assistance for the resolution’s implementation with the aim of increasing Member States’ capabilities in the fight against terrorism. The Council also urged the Directorate to intensify cooperation with international, regional and subregional organizations.

The Council welcomed the 19 March briefing by the CTED’s executive director and looked forward to the “Global Implementation Survey of resolution 1373 (2001)”. It directed the Counter-Terrorism Committee to submit an annual report on implementation of that resolution, and asked the Committee to report orally to the Council, through its chairman, at least every 180 days on its overall work and that of CTED.

== See also ==
- List of United Nations Security Council Resolutions 1801 to 1900 (2008–2009)
