= United Nations Security Council Resolution 1869 =

UN Security Council Resolution 1869
- Date: 25 March 2009
- Meeting no.: 6,099
- Code: S/RES/1869 (Document)
- Subject: The situation in Bosnia and Herzegovina
- Voting summary: 15 voted for; None voted against; None abstained
- Result: Adopted

Security Council composition
- Permanent members: China; France; Russia; United Kingdom; United States
- Non-permanent members: Austria; Burkina Faso; Costa Rica; Croatia; Japan; Libya; Mexico; Turkey; Uganda; Vietnam

United Nations Security Council Resolution 1869 was unanimously adopted on 25 March 2009.

== Resolution ==
The Security Council welcomed today the designation of Valentin Inzko as High Representative for Bosnia and Herzegovina.

Unanimously adopting resolution 1869 (2009), the Council agreed with the designation by the Steering Board of the Peace Implementation Council on 13 March of Mr. Inzko as the successor to Miroslav Lajčák.

The Council reaffirmed the final authority of the High Representative in theatre regarding the interpretation of annex 10 on civilian implementation of the 1995 General Framework Agreement for Peace in Bosnia and Herzegovina. It also reaffirmed the importance it attached to the role of the High Representative in pursuing implementation of the Peace Agreement, and in giving guidance to and coordinating the activities of the civilian organizations and agencies involved in assisting the parties to implement the Peace Agreement.

== See also ==
- List of United Nations Security Council Resolutions 1801 to 1900 (2008–2009)
