= United Nations Security Council Resolution 1828 =

UN Security Council Resolution 1828
- Date: 31 July 2008
- Meeting no.: 5,947
- Code: S/RES/1828 (Document)
- Subject: Reports of the Secretary-General on the Sudan
- Voting summary: 14 voted for; None voted against; 1 abstained
- Result: Adopted

Security Council composition
- Permanent members: China; France; Russia; United Kingdom; United States
- Non-permanent members: Burkina Faso; Belgium; Costa Rica; Croatia; Indonesia; Italy; Libya; Panama; South Africa; Vietnam

United Nations Security Council Resolution 1828 was adopted on 31 July 2008.

== Resolution ==
With less than two hours left before the mandate of the African Union-United Nations Hybrid Operation in Darfur (UNAMID) expired, the Security Council extended its mandate for a further 12 months this evening following extended consultations.

The Council adopted Resolution 1828 (2008) by 14 votes in favour, with the United States abstaining. While welcoming and expressing strong support for the mandate extension, the representative of the United States said he had abstained because the language of the resolution would send the wrong message to President Omer al-Bashir of Sudan and undermine efforts to bring him and others to justice.

Several other speakers referred to preambular paragraph 9 of the resolution, by which the Council took note of the African Union’s concerns and those of several Council members regarding potential developments following the application by the Prosecutor of the International Criminal Court for an arrest warrant against the Sudanese President on charges of genocide, war crimes, and crimes against humanity.

The representative of the Russian Federation said he had serious concerns about the negative developments that might follow the prosecutor’s request. The possibility of hard-line rebel groups taking advantage of that situation to step up their campaign against the government in Darfur can not be ruled out.

Belgium’s representative, however, was among the delegates who would have preferred to see stronger language on fighting impunity, voicing support for the work of the International Criminal Court and its pursuit of international justice. Belgium looked forward to the decision of the Pre-Trial Chamber on the Chief Prosecutor’s indictment request.

The representative of the United Kingdom, the resolution’s sponsor, said the Council had taken no position regarding the question of whether to act on the prosecutor’s proposal to indict the President of Sudan. It was not right to consider that issue as part of the renewal resolution. In resolution 1593 (2005), the Council decided that the situation in Darfur warranted an investigation by the International Criminal Court, but that discussion would raise profound questions about the relationship between peace and justice. It was not something the council should rush into.

== See also ==
- List of United Nations Security Council Resolutions 1801 to 1900 (2008–2009)
