= United Nations Security Council Resolution 1884 =

UN Security Council Resolution 1884
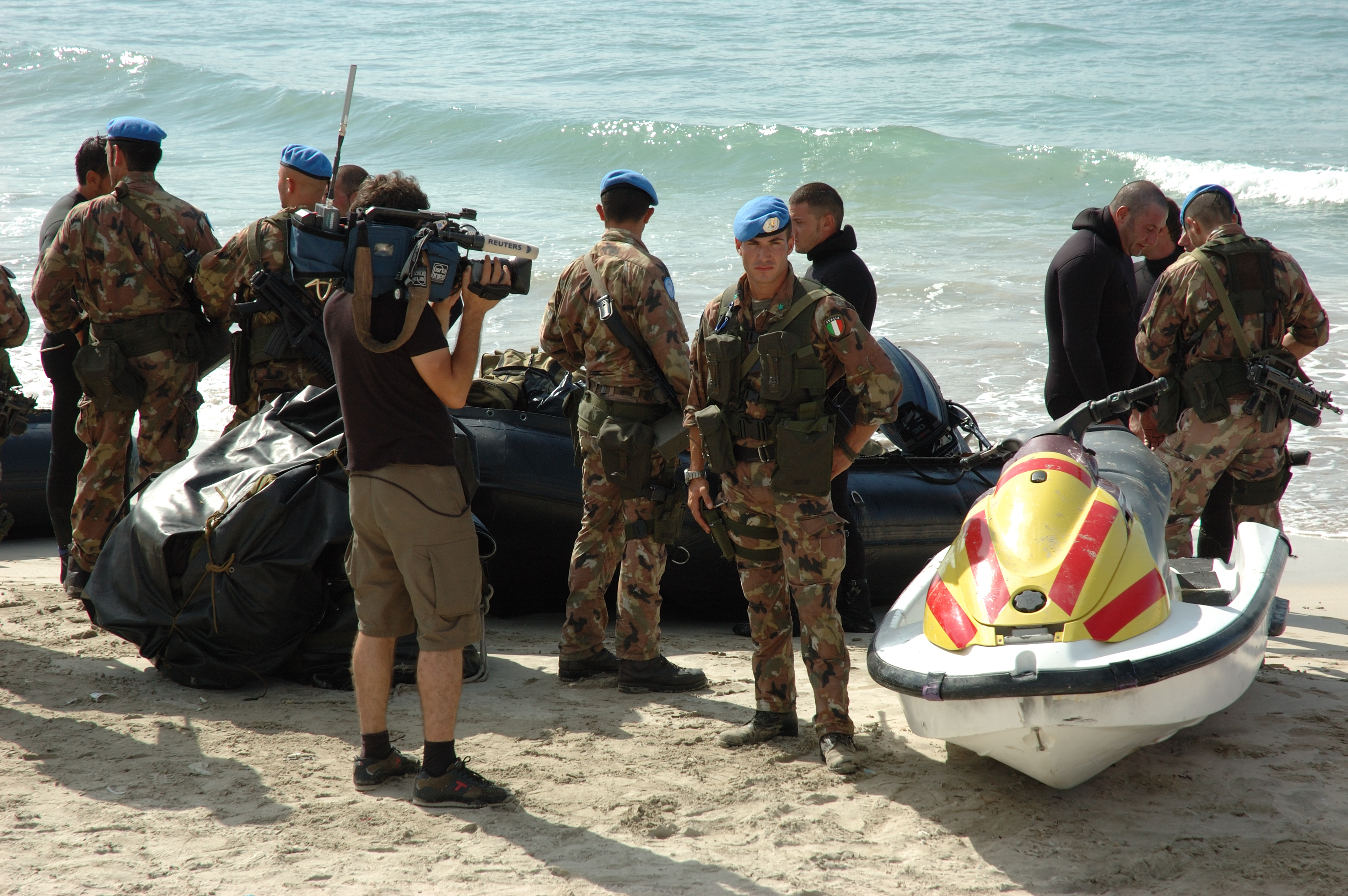
- UN soldiers
- Date: 27 August 2009
- Meeting no.: 6,183
- Code: S/RES/1884 (Document)
- Subject: The situation in the Middle East
- Voting summary: 15 voted for; None voted against; None abstained
- Result: Adopted

Security Council composition
- Permanent members: China; France; Russia; United Kingdom; United States
- Non-permanent members: Austria; Burkina Faso; Costa Rica; Croatia; Japan; Libya; Mexico; Turkey; Uganda; Vietnam

United Nations Security Council Resolution 1884 was unanimously adopted on 27 August 2009.

== Resolution ==
The Security Council today extended the mandate of the United Nations Interim Force in Lebanon (UNIFIL) for one year, until 31 August 2010, strongly calling on all concerned parties to respect the cessation of hostilities and the Blue Line and to fully cooperate with the United Nations and its Mission.

Determining that the situation in Lebanon remained a threat to international peace and security, the Council unanimously adopted resolution 1884 (2009), by which it urged the parties to fully cooperate with the 15-member body and the Secretary-General to achieve a permanent ceasefire and a long-term solution, as envisioned in resolution 1701 (2006).

The Council commended UNIFIL’s positive role, saying its deployment, together with that of the Lebanese Armed Forces, had helped to establish a new strategic environment in southern Lebanon. It welcomed the expansion of coordinated activities between UNIFIL and the Lebanese Armed Forces and encouraged further enhancement of that cooperation.

It looked forward to receiving, as soon as possible, during the coming months, the conclusions of the review of UNIFIL’s operational capacity, including the force structure, assets and requirements, as referred to in the Secretary-General’s letter of 6 August (document S/2009/407), in an effort to ensure that the Mission’s assets and resources were configured most appropriately.

Also by the text, the Council welcomed efforts by the Interim Force to implement the Secretary-General’s zero-tolerance policy on sexual exploitation and abuse and to ensure full compliance of its personnel with the United Nations code of conduct. It asked the Secretary-General to take all necessary action in that regard and to keep it informed. Troop-contributing countries were urged to take preventive and disciplinary action to ensure that such acts were properly investigated and punished in cases involving their personnel.

Speaking after the adoption of the text, the representative of Israel, Gabriela Shalev, welcomed the renewal of UNIFIL’s mandate for another year, saying that the Mission played an important role in the implementation of resolution 1701 (2006). The situation in southern Lebanon remained complex. The events in July had shed light upon a dangerous phenomenon about which Israel had been warning: Hizbullah, a terrorist organization, continued to deploy its assets and operated actively both north and south of the Litani River in blunt violation of 1701 and other relevant Council resolutions. There had been recently serious incidents in which multiple explosions had occurred in Khirbat Silim on 14 July.

== See also ==
- List of United Nations Security Council Resolutions 1801 to 1900 (2008–2009)
