= United Nations Security Council Resolution 1827 =

UN Security Council Resolution 1827
- Date: 30 July 2008
- Meeting no.: 5,946
- Code: S/RES/1812 (Document)
- Subject: The situation between Eritrea and Ethiopia
- Voting summary: 15 voted for; None voted against; None abstained
- Result: Adopted

Security Council composition
- Permanent members: China; France; Russia; United Kingdom; United States
- Non-permanent members: Burkina Faso; Belgium; Costa Rica; Croatia; Indonesia; Italy; Libya; Panama; South Africa; Vietnam

United Nations Security Council Resolution 1827 was unanimously adopted on 30 July 2008.

== Resolution ==
The Security Council today terminated the mandate of the eight-year-old peacekeeping force monitoring the border dispute between Ethiopia and Eritrea and requested UN Secretary-General Ban Ki-moon to explore further with the two Horn of Africa countries the possibility of a United Nations presence in the area.

Unanimously adopting resolution 1827 (2008), the Council decided to end the United Nations Mission in Ethiopia and Eritrea (UNMEE) when its mandate expires on Thursday, 31 July, and called on the two sides to cooperate fully with the world body in the process of liquidating the operation. It also demanded that Ethiopia and Eritrea comply fully with their obligations under the Algiers Agreements, “to show maximum restraint and refrain from any threat or use of force against each other, and to avoid provocative military activities”.

The Council emphasized that the termination was without prejudice to Ethiopia's and Eritrea's obligations under the Algiers accords, by which both countries agreed that the delimitation and demarcation determinations of the Eritrea-Ethiopia Boundary Commission would be final and binding, and that their respective forces would respect the integrity of the Temporary Security Zone (TSZ).

Expressing regret that Eritrea's obstructions towards UNMEE had “reached a level so as to undermine the basis of the Mission’s mandate and compelled [it] to temporarily relocate from Eritrea”, the Council commended efforts by the Mission and its military and civilian personnel to accomplish their duties despite the difficult circumstances, and expressed also its deep appreciation for the contributions and dedication of troop-contributing countries to UNMEE's work.

The Council also expressed strong support for the ongoing efforts by the Secretary-General and the international community to engage with Ethiopia and Eritrea to help them implement the Algiers Agreements, normalize their relations, promote stability between them, and lay the foundation for a comprehensive and lasting peace between them. It urged both countries to accept the Secretary-General's good offices.

By other terms of the text, the Council took note of the Secretary-General's letter to the Council, dated 28 July 2008, which reports on the Secretariat's consultations with the parties, based on the following options, which were outlined in his earlier report: (a) a small military observer mission in Ethiopia; (b) a small political and military liaison office in Ethiopia; and (c) a Special Envoy of the Secretary-General based in New York.

== See also ==
- List of United Nations Security Council Resolutions 1801 to 1900 (2008–2009)
