= United Nations Security Council Resolution 1804 =

UN Security Council Resolution 1804
- Date: 13 March 2008
- Meeting no.: 5852
- Code: SC/9275 (Document)
- Voting summary: 15 voted for; None voted against; None abstained
- Result: Approved

Security Council composition
- Permanent members: China; France; Russia; United Kingdom; United States
- Non-permanent members: Burkina Faso; Belgium; Costa Rica; Croatia; Indonesia; Italy; Libya; Panama; South Africa; Vietnam

United Nations Security Council Resolution 1804 was adopted on March 13, 2008, and it concerns the situation in the Great Lakes Region of the Democratic Republic of the Congo.

== Background ==
Military use of children takes three distinct forms: children can take direct part in hostilities as child soldiers, or they can be used in support roles such as porters, spies, messengers, look outs, and sexual slaves; or they can be used for political advantage either as human shields or in propaganda. Throughout history and in many cultures, children have been extensively involved in military campaigns even when such practices were supposedly against cultural morals. Since the 1970s a number of international conventions have come into effect that try to limit the participation of children in armed conflicts, nevertheless the Coalition to Stop the Use of Child Soldiers reports that the use of children in military forces, and the active participation of children in armed conflicts is widespread.

== Resolution ==
Resolution 1804 states that the presence of armed groups in the DRC is a threat to its national security. They ask that all groups lay down all their weapons and turn themselves in to Congolese and UN Mission authorities. The resolution also calls for Rwandan Armed Forces stop recruiting and using children, and to halt gender-based violence such as rape and other sexual abuse.
