= United Nations Security Council Resolution 1842 =

UN Security Council Resolution 1842
- Date: 29 October 2008
- Meeting no.: 6,004
- Code: S/RES/1842 (Document)
- Subject: The situation in Côte d'Ivoire
- Voting summary: 15 voted for; None voted against; None abstained
- Result: Adopted

Security Council composition
- Permanent members: China; France; Russia; United Kingdom; United States
- Non-permanent members: Burkina Faso; Belgium; Costa Rica; Croatia; Indonesia; Italy; Libya; Panama; South Africa; Vietnam

United Nations Security Council Resolution 1842 was unanimously adopted on 29 October 2008.

== Resolution ==
The Security Council this morning renewed for another year its arms embargo and diamond trade ban in Côte d'Ivoire, as well as targeted sanctions restricting the travel of individuals that threatened the peace process in the West African country.

By the unanimous adoption of resolution 1842 (2008), the Council said it would review those measures, which were due to expire on 31 October, after the holding of free and fair presidential elections and in light of other progress achieved in implementing key steps of the Ouagadougou Agreement, which ended the conflict that had divided Côte d'Ivoire between a rebel-held north and Government-controlled south since 2002.

The Council reiterated its demand that all Ivorian parties provide unhindered access to the Group of Experts established to monitor the sanctions, and extended the mandate of that Group for another year. It urged all the Ivorian parties to collaborate more actively with the Group of Experts and to provide it with the information and documentation it requested.

The Secretary-General was asked to communicate to the Security Council, through its sanctions committee, information gathered by the United Nations Operation in Côte d'Ivoire (UNOCI) and, where possible, reviewed by the Group of Experts, concerning the supply of arms and related materiel to the country.

The Council stressed that it was ready to impose targeted measures against persons who are determined to be a threat to the national reconciliation process in Côte d'Ivoire, as well as those threatening human rights there.

== See also ==
- List of United Nations Security Council Resolutions 1801 to 1900 (2008–2009)
