= United Nations Security Council Resolution 1826 =

UN Security Council Resolution 1826
- Date: 29 July 2008
- Meeting no.: 5,945
- Code: S/RES/1826 (Document)
- Subject: The situation in Côte d'Ivoire
- Voting summary: 15 voted for; None voted against; None abstained
- Result: Adopted

Security Council composition
- Permanent members: China; France; Russia; United Kingdom; United States
- Non-permanent members: Burkina Faso; Belgium; Costa Rica; Croatia; Indonesia; Italy; Libya; Panama; South Africa; Vietnam

United Nations Security Council Resolution 1826 was unanimously adopted on 29 July 2008.

== Resolution ==
The Security Council today decided to keep United Nations and French peacekeepers in Côte d'Ivoire through 31 January 2009 to help stage free and fair elections set for late November, emphasizing the importance of the international community’s continuing support in helping the West African country strengthen its electoral systems and processes.

Acting under Chapter VII of the United Nations Charter, the Council unanimously adopted resolution 1826 (2008), by which it decided to renew the mandates of the United Nations Operation in Côte d'Ivoire (UNOCI) and of the French forces which support it, “in particular to support the organization in Côte d’Ivoire of free, open, fair and transparent elections”.

Also by the text, the Council expressed its intention to review by 31 January the mandates of UNOCI and its French support unit, as well as the Mission’s troop levels, in light of the progress achieved in implementing key steps of the peace and electoral processes. It requested Secretary-General Ban Ki-moon to provide a report in that regard three weeks before that date, including benchmarks for a possible phased drawdown of UNOCI troop levels, “taking into consideration the electoral process and the situation on the ground, and in particular the security conditions”.

The Council went on to “strongly encourage” the defence and security forces of Côte d'Ivoire and the Forces nouvelles jointly to develop a comprehensive plan for the security of the elections, in close coordination with President Blaise Compaoré of Burkina Faso, Facilitator of the Inter-Ivorian dialogue, and with the technical and logistical support of UNOCI and the French forces.

Further by the resolution, the Council urged the Ivorian political parties to comply fully with the Code of Good Conduct for the elections, which they signed under the auspices of the Secretary-General, and the Ivorian authorities in particular to allow equitable access to the public media. The text also stressed the importance of ensuring equal protection of and respect for the human rights of every Ivorian as they related to the electoral system, and in particular of removing obstacles and challenges to women’s participation and full involvement in public life.

== See also ==
- List of United Nations Security Council Resolutions 1801 to 1900 (2008–2009)
