= United Nations Security Council Resolution 1839 =

UN Security Council Resolution 1839
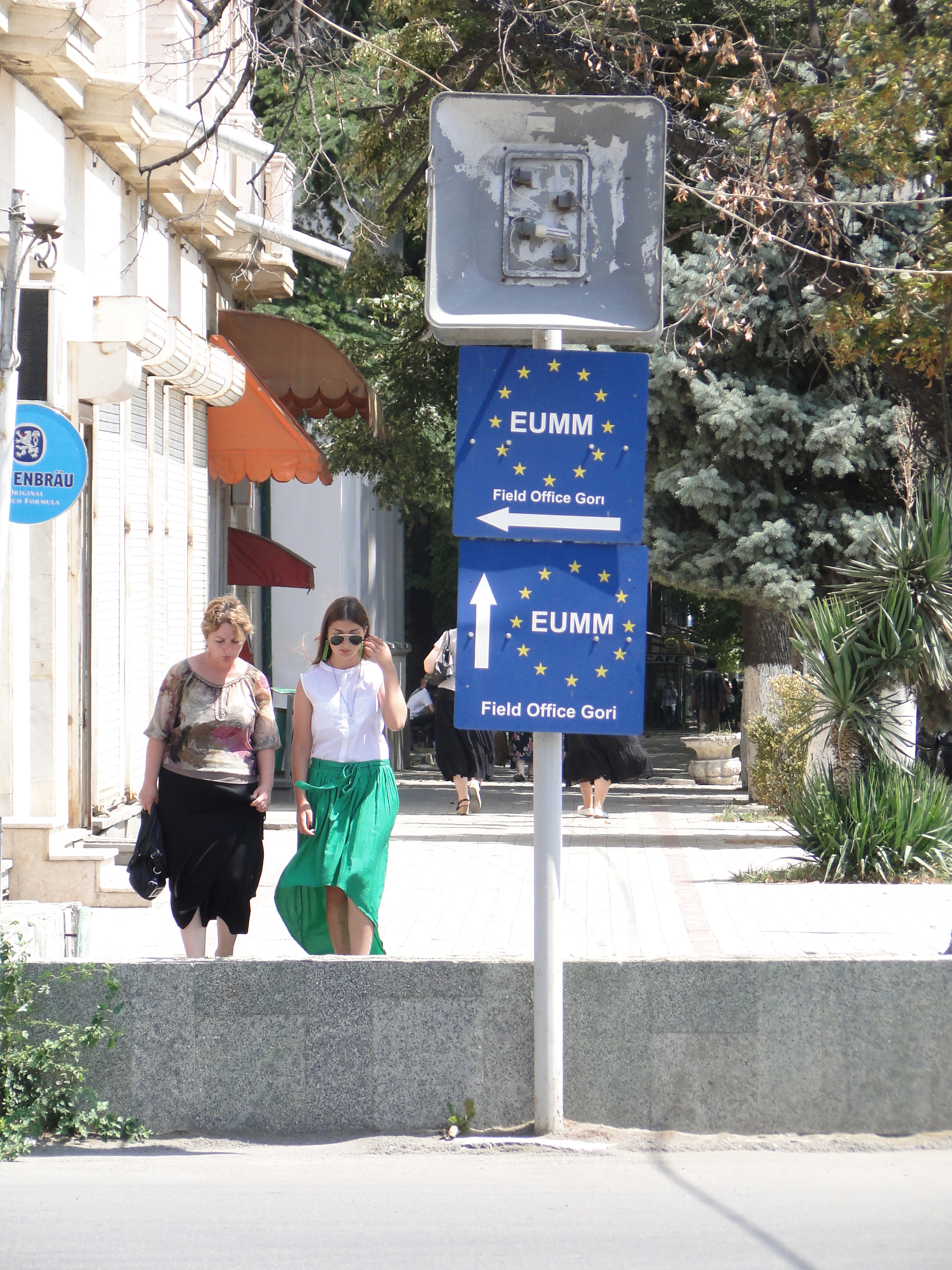
- European Union Monitoring Mission in Georgia
- Date: 9 October 2008
- Meeting no.: 5,992
- Code: S/RES/1839 (Document)
- Subject: The situation in Georgia
- Voting summary: 15 voted for; None voted against; None abstained
- Result: Adopted

Security Council composition
- Permanent members: China; France; Russia; United Kingdom; United States
- Non-permanent members: Burkina Faso; Belgium; Costa Rica; Croatia; Indonesia; Italy; Libya; Panama; South Africa; Vietnam

United Nations Security Council Resolution 1839 was unanimously adopted on 9 October 2008.

== Resolution ==
Unanimously adopting resolution 1839 (2008), the Council took no other decisions through its action, though it referred to the Secretary General’s most recent report, in which he observes that, following the recent Russian–Georgian conflict in South Ossetia, UNOMIG’s area of responsibility is unclear.

In the report, the Secretary-General recommends a technical, four-month extension of the Mission, which for the past 14 years has been entrusted with overseeing the ceasefire accord between Georgia’s Government and Abkhaz separatists in the north-western part of the country.

== See also ==
- Russo-Georgian War
- South Ossetia
- United Nations
