= United Nations Security Council Resolution 2021 =

UN Security Council Resolution 2021
- Location of Democratic Republic of the Congo
- Date: 29 November 2011
- Meeting no.: 6,671
- Code: S/RES/2021 (Document)
- Subject: The situation concerning the Democratic Republic of the Congo
- Voting summary: 15 voted for; None voted against; None abstained
- Result: Adopted

Security Council composition
- Permanent members: China; France; Russia; United Kingdom; United States
- Non-permanent members: Bosnia–Herzegovina; Brazil; Colombia; Germany; Gabon; India; Lebanon; Nigeria; Portugal; South Africa

United Nations Security Council Resolution 2021 was unanimously adopted on 29 November 2011.

== Resolution ==
Condemning the continuing illicit flow of weapons within and into the Democratic Republic of the Congo, the Security Council today renewed until 30 November 2012 the arms embargo and related sanctions on that country, and requested the Secretary-General to extend the mandate of the Group of Experts monitoring those measures.

Unanimously adopting resolution 2021 (2011) under Chapter VII of the United Nations Charter, the Council requested the Secretary-General to appoint a sixth expert, on natural resources, and asked the Group of Experts — established under resolution 1533 (2004) — to report back by 18 May 2012 and again before 19 October 2012.

Established in 2003, the sanctions regime consists of an arms embargo against armed groups in the country that are not part of the Government’s integrated army or police units, as well as a travel ban and an asset freeze on violators of the embargo and other persons and entities designated by the Sanctions Committee for the Democratic Republic of the Congo, as determined by relevant Security Council resolutions.

Welcoming the support of the due diligence guidelines for importers, processing industries and consumers of Congolese mineral products by the Democratic Republic of the Congo, the Council called on all States to assist the country and others in the Great Lakes region in the implementation of those guidelines. It encouraged raising awareness of the due diligence guidelines, in particular in the gold sector, as part of a broader effort to mitigate the risk of further financing armed groups and criminal networks within the Armed Forces of the Democratic Republic of the Congo (FARDC).

Also by its resolution, the Council recommended that all States, particularly those in the region, regularly publish full import and export statistics for natural resources, including gold, cassiterite, coltan, wolframite, timber and charcoal, and enhance information sharing and joint action at the regional level to investigate and combat regional criminal networks and armed groups involved in the illegal exploitation of natural resources.

== See also ==
- List of United Nations Security Council Resolutions 2001 to 2100
