= United Nations Security Council Resolution 1845 =

UN Security Council Resolution 1845
- Date: 20 November 2008
- Meeting no.: 6,021
- Code: S/RES/1845 (Document)
- Subject: The situation in Bosnia and Herzegovina
- Voting summary: 15 voted for; None voted against; None abstained
- Result: Adopted

Security Council composition
- Permanent members: China; France; Russia; United Kingdom; United States
- Non-permanent members: Burkina Faso; Belgium; Costa Rica; Croatia; Indonesia; Italy; Libya; Panama; South Africa; Vietnam

United Nations Security Council Resolution 1845 was unanimously adopted on 20 November 2008.

== Resolution ==
Unanimously adopting resolution 1845 (2008), and acting under Chapter VII of the United Nations Charter, the Council also authorized the continued presence of a headquarters for the North Atlantic Treaty Organization (NATO), which led the multinational stabilization force (SFOR) that handed over peacekeeping responsibilities to EUFOR in 2004, and recognized the right of both organizations to take all necessary measures to defend themselves from attacks or threats.

The Council reiterated that the primary responsibility for the further implementation of the Peace Agreement lay with the Bosnian authorities. Their compliance –- in particular full cooperation with the International Tribunal for the Former Yugoslavia—would determine the continued willingness of the international community and major donors to provide support, the resolution said.

The Council also emphasized its full support for the High Representative in monitoring implementation of the Peace Agreement and recognized that he is the final authority in theatre regarding the interpretation of civilian implementation of the Agreement.
