= United Nations Security Council Resolution 1857 =

UN Security Council Resolution 1857
- Date: 22 December 2008
- Meeting no.: 6,056
- Code: S/RES/1857 (Document)
- Subject: The situation concerning the Democratic Republic of the Congo
- Voting summary: 15 voted for; None voted against; None abstained
- Result: Adopted

Security Council composition
- Permanent members: China; France; Russia; United Kingdom; United States
- Non-permanent members: Burkina Faso; Belgium; Costa Rica; Croatia; Indonesia; Italy; Libya; Panama; South Africa; Vietnam

United Nations Security Council Resolution 1857 was unanimously adopted on 22 December 2008.

== Resolution ==
The Security Council, condemning the continuing illicit trafficking of weapons in the Democratic Republic of the Congo, decided this morning to extend the arms embargo there and its related sanctions regime, with some modifications, until 30 November 2009.

Unanimously adopting resolution 1857 (2008), the Council also extended the mandate of the Group of Experts it had established to monitor the sanctions until the same date, as it reiterated its serious concern over the continued presence of armed groups in the eastern part of the vast central African country, demanding that they abide by recent agreements.

The regime, which was established in 2003 following the country’s devastating multi-party conflict, includes a ban on weapons for armed groups that are not part of the Government’s security forces or the United Nations Mission known as MONUC. It also includes a travel ban and assets freeze on those who violate the embargo, commit human rights violations, impede the disarmament and demobilization of armed groups or support them through illegal exploitation of natural resources.

Through today’s text, the 15-member Council expanded the mandate of its sub-committee that administers the regime, deciding it would keep the list of individuals and entities subject to sanctions as accurate and as up to date as possible. It called upon all States, particularly those in the region, to report to that committee on the actions they have taken to implement the measures.

The Council will review the measures set forth in the resolution when appropriate, but not later than 30 November, in the light of consolidation of the security situation, in particular, progress in security sector reform and in the disarming, demobilization, repatriation, resettlement and reintegration processes of Congolese and foreign armed groups.

== See also ==
- List of United Nations Security Council Resolutions 1801 to 1900 (2008–2009)
