= United Nations Security Council Resolution 1896 =

UN Security Council Resolution 1896
- Date: 30 November 2009
- Meeting no.: 6,225
- Code: S/RES/1896 (Document)
- Subject: The situation concerning the Democratic Republic of the Congo
- Voting summary: 15 voted for; None voted against; None abstained
- Result: Adopted

Security Council composition
- Permanent members: China; France; Russia; United Kingdom; United States
- Non-permanent members: Austria; Burkina Faso; Costa Rica; Croatia; Japan; Libya; Mexico; Turkey; Uganda; Vietnam

United Nations Security Council Resolution 1896 was unanimously adopted on 30 November 2009.

== Resolution ==
The Security Council, condemning the continuing illicit traffic of weapons in the Democratic Republic of the Congo, decided this morning to extend and expand the arms embargo there and its related sanctions regime until 30 November 2010.

Established in 2003, the sanctions regime consists of an arms embargo against armed groups in the country that are not part of the Government’s integrated army or police units, as well as a travel ban and assets freeze on those violating the embargo, as determined in resolutions 1493 (2003), 1596 (2005), 1698 (2006), 1771 (2007), 1807 (2008) and 1857 (2008).

Unanimously adopting resolution 1896 (2009) and acting under Chapter VII of the United Nations’ Charter, the Council also expanded the mandate of its subcommittee to include the promulgation of guidelines for listing and notifying sanctioned individuals, to hold regular consultations with concerned Member States to ensure the resolution's full implementation and to specify the necessary information States should provide to fulfil notification requirements.

The Council also extended the mandate of the Group of Experts for the same period, expanding it to include the creation of recommendations on due-diligence guidelines for the purchase, sourcing, acquisition and processing of mineral products from the Democratic Republic of the Congo. The group was asked to focus its activities on North and South Kivu, Ituri and the Orientale Province, as well as on regional and international networks providing support to armed groups operating in eastern Congo.

By other terms, the Council called on all States, particularly those in the region and those in which sanctioned individuals and entities are based, to implement the resolution fully. Those States that had not already done so were called on to report to the Committee, within 45 days, on their actions. The Council further demanded that all parties and all States ensure cooperation with the Group of Experts by individuals and entities within their jurisdiction or under their control. In that regard, States are asked to identify a focal point to the Committee.

The Council will review the measures set forth in this resolution when appropriate, but no later than 30 November 2010, with a view to adjusting them in light of the security situation in the Democratic Republic of the Congo, in particular progress in security sector reform and in integrating the armed forces and reforming the national police and disarming, demobilizing, repatriating, resettling and reintegrating Congolese and foreign armed groups.

== See also ==
- List of United Nations Security Council Resolutions 1801 to 1900 (2008–2009)
