= United Nations Security Council Resolution 1890 =

UN Security Council Resolution 1890
- Date: 8 October 2009
- Meeting no.: 6,198
- Code: S/RES/1890 (Document)
- Subject: The situation in Afghanistan
- Voting summary: 15 voted for; None voted against; None abstained
- Result: Adopted

Security Council composition
- Permanent members: China; France; Russia; United Kingdom; United States
- Non-permanent members: Austria; Burkina Faso; Costa Rica; Croatia; Japan; Libya; Mexico; Turkey; Uganda; Vietnam

United Nations Security Council Resolution 1890 was unanimously adopted on 8 October 2009.

== Resolution ==
Expressing its strong concern over the increase in violence and criminality in Afghanistan, the Security Council today extended the authorization for the International Security Assistance Force (ISAF) for 12 months beyond 13 October 2009.

As its members unanimously adopted resolution 1890 (2009), the Council also called on Member States to contribute personnel, equipment and other resources in order to allow ISAF to meet security and assistance challenges. It stressed the importance of strengthening the Afghan security sector so as to allow it to establish the rule of law throughout the country, encouraging ISAF and other partners to support the planned expansion of the Afghan National Army and the Afghan National Police.

== See also ==
- List of United Nations Security Council Resolutions 1801 to 1900 (2008–2009)
