= United Nations Security Council Resolution 1833 =

UN Security Council Resolution 1833
- Date: 22 September 2008
- Meeting no.: 5,977
- Code: S/RES/1833 (Document)
- Subject: The situation in Afghanistan
- Voting summary: 15 voted for; None voted against; None abstained
- Result: Adopted

Security Council composition
- Permanent members: China; France; Russia; United Kingdom; United States
- Non-permanent members: Burkina Faso; Belgium; Costa Rica; Croatia; Indonesia; Italy; Libya; Panama; South Africa; Vietnam

United Nations Security Council Resolution 1833 was unanimously adopted on 22 September 2008.

== Resolution ==
Recognizing the need to curb the Taliban resurgence and the narcotics trade while minimizing civilian casualties in Afghanistan, the Security Council today decided to extend the authorization of the International Security Assistance Force (ISAF) in that country for 12 months.

According to resolution 1833 (2008), passed unanimously under the binding Chapter VII of the United Nations Charter, the extension would apply for one year beyond 13 October 2008, when the present authorization was set to expire. In the resolution, the 15-member body also called on Member States to contribute personnel, equipment and other resources to ISAF and to the related Trust Fund.

In addition, the Council encouraged ISAF and other partners to accelerate progress in strengthening the Afghan national security sector so that it could ensure the rule of law throughout the country.

Following the resolution's passage, the representative of Libya expressed his hope that the decision would assist the people and Government of Afghanistan in their quest for security, but also voiced his concern over the magnitude of civilian casualties in Afghanistan and reasserted that the struggle to defeat terrorism did not excuse such deaths. He urged the international force to protect civilians and their rights, and asked that those who harmed civilians be brought to justice. He also stressed that terrorism would not be defeated by force alone.

== See also ==
- List of United Nations Security Council Resolutions 1801 to 1900 (2008–2009)
