= United Nations Security Council Resolution 1931 =

UN Security Council Resolution 1931
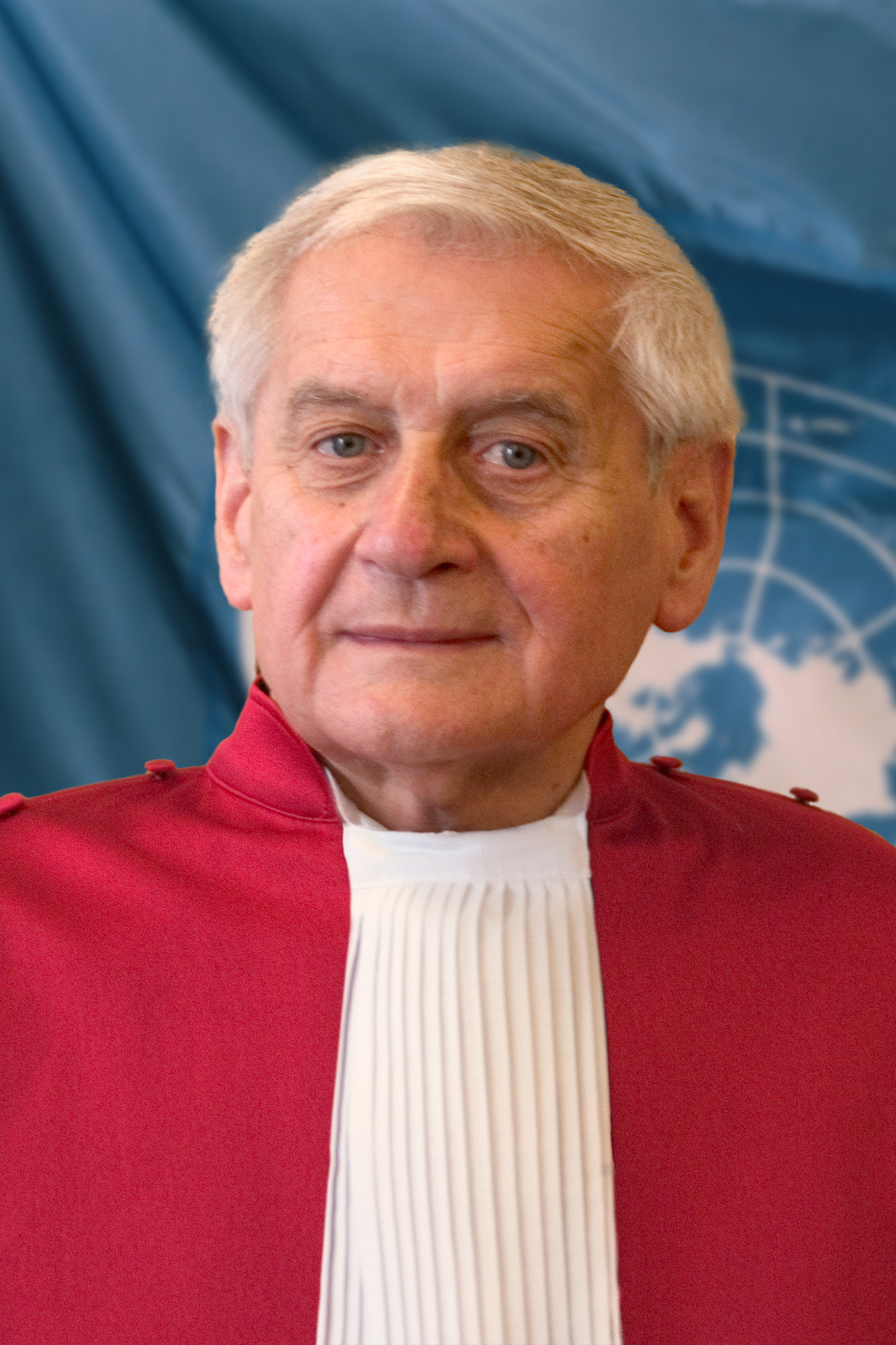
- Hungarian judge Árpád Prandler, whose term was extended in Resolution 1931
- Date: 29 June 2010
- Meeting no.: 6,348
- Code: S/RES/1931 (Document)
- Subject: International Tribunal for the former Yugoslavia
- Voting summary: 15 voted for; None voted against; None abstained
- Result: Adopted

Security Council composition
- Permanent members: China; France; Russia; United Kingdom; United States
- Non-permanent members: Austria; Bosnia–Herzegovina; Brazil; Gabon; Japan; Lebanon; Mexico; Nigeria; Turkey; Uganda

United Nations Security Council Resolution 1931, adopted unanimously on June 29, 2010, after recalling resolutions 827 (1993), 1581 (2005), 1597 (2005), 1613 (2005), 1629 (2005), 1660 (2006), 1668 (2006), 1800 (2008), 1837 (2008), 1849 (2008), 1877 (2009), 1900 (2009) and 1915 (2010), the Council noted that the 2010 target for the completion of trials at the International Criminal Tribunal for the former Yugoslavia (ICTY) could not be met, and therefore extended the terms of 23 judges at the ICTY.

== Resolution ==
=== Observations ===
The Security Council recalled resolutions 1503 (2003) and 1534 (2004) which called for the completion of all ICTY cases by 2010. It noted however that the ICTY was unable to complete its work by 2010 and had a new estimation date of mid-2012, and expressed concern at the loss of experienced staff at the Tribunal. Earlier in 2009 the Council expressed its intention to review the terms of all trial judges at the ICTY. It noted the desirability of nine ad litem judges serving beyond their planned three-year term, and further noted that one permanent and three ad litem judges were to leave in 2010 upon the completion of their cases.

=== Acts ===
Acting under Chapter VII of the United Nations Charter, the Council reaffirmed the necessity of the trial of those indicted by the ICTY and called for full co-operation from all states, particularly those in the former Yugoslavia, with regard to the arrests of Ratko Mladić and Goran Hadžić. It also acknowledged that the Tribunal had to be adequately staffed.

The following permanent judges had their terms extended until December 31, 2012 or until the completion of their cases or their terms in the Appeals Chamber:

- Carmel Agius (Malta)
- Liu Daqun (China)
- Theodor Meron (United States)
- Fausto Pocar (Italy)
- Patrick Robinson (Jamaica)

The following permanent judges had their terms extended until December 31, 2011 or until the completion of their cases:

- Jean-Claude Antonetti (France)
- Guy Delvoie (Belgium)
- Burton Hall (Bahamas)
- Christoph Flügge (Germany)
- O-Gon Kwon (South Korea)
- Bakone Justice Moloto (South Africa)
- Howard Morrison (United Kingdom)
- Alphons Orie (Netherlands)

The following ad litem judges had their terms extended until December 31, 2011 or until the completion of their cases:

- Melville Baird (Trinidad and Tobago)
- Pedro David (Argentina)
- Elizabeth Gwaunza (Zimbabwe)
- Frederik Harhoff (Denmark)
- Flavia Lattanzi (Italy)
- Antoine Kesia-Mbe Mindua (Democratic Republic of Congo)
- Prisca Matimba Nyambe (Zambia)
- Michèle Picard (France)
- Árpád Prandler (Hungary)
- Stefan Trechsel (Switzerland)

The terms of the ad litem judges, with the exception of Prisca Matimba Nyambe, would be allowed to sit beyond the cumulative period provided for in the Statute of the ICTY. Finally, the Security Council stated its intention to extend the terms of office of judges by June 30, 2011, depending on the agenda of the Tribunal.

== See also ==
- Breakup of Yugoslavia
- List of indictees of the International Criminal Tribunal for the former Yugoslavia
- List of United Nations Security Council Resolutions 1901 to 2000 (2009–2011)
- Yugoslav Wars
