= United Nations Security Council Resolution 1954 =

UN Security Council Resolution 1954
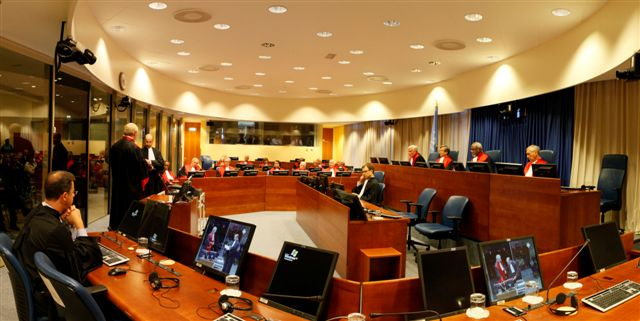
- Courtroom at the ICTY (Photograph provided courtesy of the ICTY)
- Date: 14 December 2010
- Meeting no.: 6,446
- Code: S/RES/1954 (Document)
- Subject: International Tribunal for the former Yugoslavia
- Voting summary: 15 voted for; None voted against; None abstained
- Result: Adopted

Security Council composition
- Permanent members: China; France; Russia; United Kingdom; United States
- Non-permanent members: Austria; Bosnia–Herzegovina; Brazil; Gabon; Japan; Lebanon; Mexico; Nigeria; Turkey; Uganda

United Nations Security Council Resolution 1954, adopted unanimously on December 14, 2010, after recalling resolutions 827 (1993), 1581 (2005), 1597 (2005), 1613 (2005), 1629 (2005), 1660 (2006), 1668 (2006), 1800 (2008), 1837 (2008), 1849 (2008), 1877 (2009), 1900 (2009) and 1931 (2010), the Council permitted two judges to serve beyond their term of office to enable them to complete work on cases in which they were involved at the International Criminal Tribunal for the former Yugoslavia (ICTY).

== Resolution ==
=== Observations ===
The Security Council recalled resolutions 1503 (2003) and 1534 (2004) which called for the completion of all ICTY cases by 2010. It noted however that the ICTY was unable to complete its work by 2010 and expressed concern at the loss of experienced staff at the tribunal.

=== Acts ===
Acting under Chapter VII of the United Nations Charter, the Council extended the terms of judges Kevin Parker and Uldis Kinis in order for them to complete the Đorđević and Gotovina et al. cases by February and March 2011 respectively. It also reiterated the importance of adequate staffing at the ICTY for it to complete its work as soon as possible, calling upon the Secretariat and other United Nations bodies to address the issue.

== See also ==
- Breakup of Yugoslavia
- List of indictees of the International Criminal Tribunal for the former Yugoslavia
- List of United Nations Security Council Resolutions 1901 to 2000 (2009–2011)
- Yugoslav Wars
