= United Nations Security Council Resolution 1915 =

UN Security Council Resolution 1915
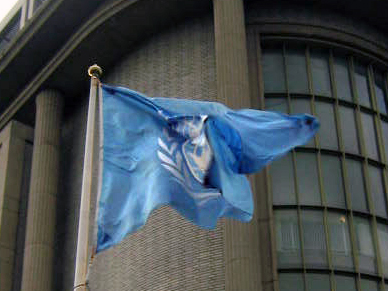
- Flag of the ICTY
- Date: 18 March 2010
- Meeting no.: 6,286
- Code: S/RES/1915 (Document)
- Subject: International Tribunal for the former Yugoslavia
- Voting summary: 15 voted for; None voted against; None abstained
- Result: Adopted

Security Council composition
- Permanent members: China; France; Russia; United Kingdom; United States
- Non-permanent members: Austria; Bosnia–Herzegovina; Brazil; Gabon; Japan; Lebanon; Mexico; Nigeria; Turkey; Uganda

United Nations Security Council Resolution 1915, adopted unanimously on March 18, 2010, after recalling resolutions 827 (1993), 1581 (2005), 1597 (2005), 1613 (2005), 1629 (2005), 1660 (2006), 1668 (2006), 1800 (2008), 1837 (2008), 1849 (2008), 1877 (2009) and 1900 (2009), the Council, acting under Chapter VII of the United Nations Charter, allowed a temporary increase in judges at the International Criminal Tribunal for the former Yugoslavia (ICTY) to serve beyond the expiry of their term of office to enable them to complete work on cases in which they were involved.

The Council noted that, in its Resolution 1900, the number of judges could exceed the maximum of 12 provided for in the Statute of the International Tribunal to a maximum of 13, returning to 12 by the end of March 2010. However, due to unforeseen circumstances this would not occur due to a delay in the delivery of the judgement in the Popović case. In this regard, the Council was convinced of the advisability of permitting the temporary increase in the total number of ad litem judges.

The International Criminal Tribunal for the Former Yugoslavia, established in Resolution 827 (1993), was a United Nations court of law dealing with war crimes that took place during the conflicts of the early 1990s that followed the break-up of the Socialist Federal Republic of Yugoslavia.

== See also ==
- Breakup of Yugoslavia
- List of indictees of the International Criminal Tribunal for the former Yugoslavia
- List of United Nations Security Council Resolutions 1901 to 2000 (2009–2011)
- Yugoslav Wars
