= United Nations Security Council Resolution 1900 =

UN Security Council Resolution 1900
- Coat of arms of the Socialist Federal Republic of Yugoslavia
- Date: 16 December 2009
- Meeting no.: 6,242
- Code: S/RES/1900 (Document)
- Subject: International Tribunal for the former Yugoslavia
- Voting summary: 15 voted for; None voted against; None abstained
- Result: Adopted

Security Council composition
- Permanent members: China; France; Russia; United Kingdom; United States
- Non-permanent members: Austria; Burkina Faso; Costa Rica; Croatia; Japan; Libya; Mexico; Turkey; Uganda; Vietnam

United Nations Security Council Resolution 1900, adopted unanimously on December 16, 2009, after recalling resolutions 827 (1993), 1581 (2005), 1597 (2005), 1613 (2005), 1629 (2005), 1660 (2006), 1668 (2006), 1800 (2008), 1837 (2008), 1849 (2008) and 1877 (2009), the Council permitted several judges at the International Criminal Tribunal for the former Yugoslavia to serve beyond the expiry of their term of office to enable them to complete work on cases in which they were involved.

Acting under Chapter VII of the United Nations Charter, the Council decided that judges Kimberley Prost (Canada) and Ole Bjørn Støle (Norway) whose terms were to expire on December 31, 2009, could complete the Popović case which was scheduled to end by March 2010. At the same time, it was noted that the total number of ad litem judges serving on the Tribunal might temporarily exceed the maximum of 12 provided for to a maximum of 13. The number of judges would return to 12 by the end of March 2010.

The International Criminal Tribunal for the Former Yugoslavia, established in Resolution 827 (1993), was a United Nations court of law dealing with war crimes that took place during the conflicts of the early 1990s that followed the break-up of the Socialist Federal Republic of Yugoslavia.

== See also ==
- Breakup of Yugoslavia
- List of indictees of the International Criminal Tribunal for the former Yugoslavia
- List of United Nations Security Council Resolutions 1801 to 1900 (2008–2009)
- Yugoslav Wars
