= List of people indicted in the ICTY =

Between 1994 and 2004, the International Criminal Tribunal for the Former Yugoslavia, otherwise known as the ICTY, indicted 161 persons, with no indictees remaining at large since the arrest of Goran Hadžić on 20 July 2011. This article lists them along with their allegiance, details of charges against them and the disposition of their cases. The list includes those whose indictments were withdrawn by the ICTY.

Dražen Erdemović, a Bosnian Croat fighting in the Bosnian Serb contingent, and Franko Simatović, an ethnic Croat and high-ranking official of the Yugoslav State Security Service, are the only indictees on this list who crossed either religious and/or ethnic lines. Biljana Plavšić is the sole female ICTY indictee.

The ICTY announced a verdict in its last ongoing case on November 22, 2017: Ratko Mladić, sentenced to life imprisonment. The International Residual Mechanism for Criminal Tribunals completed the last appeal procedure on 31 May 2023. There are no ongoing trials since. 13 defendants were transferred to other courts, with 11 being convicted, one, Rahim Ademi, acquitted, and another, Vladimir Kovačević, was ruled mentally unfit to stand trial in 2004.

The list contains 161 names. 94 of these are Serbs, 29 are Croats, 9 are Albanians, 9 are Bosniaks, 2 are Macedonians and 2 are Montenegrins. The others are of unknown ethnicity or their charges have been withdrawn. There are 62 convicted Serbs, 18 convicted Croats, 5 convicted Bosniaks, 2 convicted Montenegrins, 1 convicted Macedonian and 1 convicted Albanian in this list.

== List of indictees ==
Allegiance	Case name	Name	Status	Guilty of:				Start of trial	Final judgement		Aftermath	Link
Allegiance	Case name	Name	Status	G	H	W	C		Sentence	Date	Aftermath	Link
Republika Srpska	Bosnia and Herzegovina & Srebrenica	Mladić, Ratko	Sentenced by IRMCT	Yes	Yes	Yes		16 May 2012	Life imprisonment.	8 June 2021	Died while serving the sentence in the UN Detention Unit on 27 August 2026.	IT-09-92 MICT‑13‑56
Republika Srpska	Bosnia and Herzegovina & Srebrenica	Karadžić, Radovan	Sentenced by IRMCT	Yes	Yes	Yes		26 October 2009	Life imprisonment.	20 March 2019	Serving the sentence in the United Kingdom.	IT-95-5/18 MICT‑13‑55
Croatian Republic of Herzeg-Bosnia	Lašva Valley	Aleksovski, Zlatko	Sentenced by ICTY			Yes		6 January 1998	7 years	24 March 2000	Served his sentence in Finland. Early release on 14 November 2001.	IT-95-14/1
Croatian Republic of Herzeg-Bosnia	Lašva Valley	Blaškić, Tihomir	Sentenced by ICTY			Yes	Yes	24 June 1997	9 years	29 July 2004	Early release on 2 August 2004.	IT-95-14
Croatian Republic of Herzeg-Bosnia	Lašva Valley	Bralo, Miroslav	Sentenced by ICTY		Yes	Yes	Yes	Pleaded guilty to all charges	20 years	2 April 2007	Serving the sentence in Sweden.	IT-95-17
Croatian Republic of Herzeg-Bosnia	Lašva Valley	Furundžija, Anto	Sentenced by ICTY			Yes		8 June 1998	10 years	21 July 2000	Served his sentence in Finland. Early release on 17 August 2004.	IT-95-17/1
Croatian Republic of Herzeg-Bosnia	Lašva Valley	Kordić, Dario	Sentenced by ICTY		Yes	Yes	Yes	12 April 1999	25 years	17 December 2004	Served his sentence in Austria. Early release on 6 June 2014.	IT-95-14/2
Croatian Republic of Herzeg-Bosnia	Lašva Valley	Čerkez, Mario	Sentenced by ICTY		Yes			12 April 1999	6 years	17 December 2004	Released on 2 December 2004 having served his sentence.	IT-95-14/2
Croatian Republic of Herzeg-Bosnia	Lašva Valley	Šantić, Ivan	Indictment withdrawn									IT-95-14/2
Croatian Republic of Herzeg-Bosnia	Lašva Valley	Skopljak, Pero	Indictment withdrawn									IT-95-14/2
Croatian Republic of Herzeg-Bosnia	Lašva Valley	Josipović, Drago	Sentenced by ICTY		Yes			17 August 1998	12 years	23 October 2001	Served his sentence in Spain. Early release on 30 January 2006.	IT-95-16
Croatian Republic of Herzeg-Bosnia	Lašva Valley	Šantić, Vladimir	Sentenced by ICTY		Yes			17 August 1998	18 years	23 October 2001	Served his sentence in Spain. Early release on 9 February 2009.	IT-95-16
Croatian Republic of Herzeg-Bosnia	Lašva Valley	Kupreškić, Zoran	Acquitted					17 August 1998	Found not guilty.	23 October 2001	Immediately released.	IT-95-16
Croatian Republic of Herzeg-Bosnia	Lašva Valley	Kupreškić, Mirjan	Acquitted					17 August 1998	Found not guilty.	23 October 2001	Immediately released.	IT-95-16
Croatian Republic of Herzeg-Bosnia	Lašva Valley	Kupreškić, Vlatko	Acquitted					17 August 1998	Found not guilty.	23 October 2001	Immediately released.	IT-95-16
Croatian Republic of Herzeg-Bosnia	Lašva Valley	Papić, Dragan	Acquitted					17 August 1998	Found not guilty.	14 January 2000	Immediately released.	IT-95-16
Croatian Republic of Herzeg-Bosnia	Lašva Valley	Alilović, Stipo	Died before trial									IT-95-16
Croatian Republic of Herzeg-Bosnia	Lašva Valley	Katava, Marinko	Indictment withdrawn								Indictment withdrawn 19 December 1997.	IT-95-16
Croatian Republic of Herzeg-Bosnia	Lašva Valley	Marinić, Zoran	Indictment withdrawn								Indictment withdrawn on 2 October 2002.	IT-95-15
Croatian Republic of Herzeg-Bosnia	Lašva Valley	Ljubičić, Paško	Transferred to national courts								Case referred to Bosnia and Herzegovina. Sentenced to 10 years.	IT-00-41
Croatian Republic of Herzeg-Bosnia		Prlić, Jadranko	Sentenced by ICTY		Yes	Yes	Yes	26 April 2006	25 years	29 November 2017	Serving the sentence in Great Britain.	IT-04-74
Croatian Republic of Herzeg-Bosnia		Stojić, Bruno	Sentenced by ICTY		Yes	Yes	Yes	26 April 2006	20 years	29 November 2017	Serving the sentence in Austria.	IT-04-74
Croatian Republic of Herzeg-Bosnia		Praljak, Slobodan	Sentenced by ICTY		Yes	Yes	Yes	26 April 2006	20 years	29 November 2017	Committed suicide in the courtroom on 29 November 2017 during the sentencing.	IT-04-74
Croatian Republic of Herzeg-Bosnia		Petković, Milivoj	Sentenced by ICTY		Yes	Yes	Yes	26 April 2006	20 years	29 November 2017	Served his sentence in Belgium. Early release on 23 December 2021.	IT-04-74
Croatian Republic of Herzeg-Bosnia		Ćorić, Valentin	Sentenced by ICTY		Yes	Yes	Yes	26 April 2006	16 years	29 November 2017	Early release effective 16 January 2019.	IT-04-74
Croatian Republic of Herzeg-Bosnia		Pušić, Berislav	Sentenced by ICTY		Yes	Yes	Yes	26 April 2006	10 years	29 November 2017	Early release effective 24 April 2018.	IT-04-74
Croatian Republic of Herzeg-Bosnia	Tuta and Štela	Naletilić, Mladen	Sentenced by ICTY		Yes	Yes	Yes	10 September 2001	20 years	3 May 2006	Served his sentence in Italy. Early release on 29 November 2012.	IT-98-34
Croatian Republic of Herzeg-Bosnia	Tuta and Štela	Martinović, Vinko	Sentenced by ICTY		Yes	Yes	Yes	10 September 2001	18 years	3 May 2006	Served his sentence in Italy. Early release on 16 December 2011.	IT-98-34
Croatian Republic of Herzeg-Bosnia	Stupni Do	Rajić, Ivica	Sentenced by ICTY				Yes	Pleaded guilty to grave breaches of the Geneva conventions.	12 years	8 May 2006	Served his sentence in Spain. Early release on 22 August 2011.	IT-95-12
Croatian Republic of Herzeg-Bosnia	Čelebići camp	Mucić, Zdravko	Sentenced by ICTY				Yes	10 March 1997	9 years	8 April 2003	Early release on 18 July 2003.	IT-96-21
Republic of Bosnia and Herzegovina	Čelebići camp	Delić, Hazim	Sentenced by ICTY				Yes	10 March 1997	18 years	8 April 2003	Served his sentence in Finland. Early release on 24 June 2008.	IT-96-21
Republic of Bosnia and Herzegovina	Čelebići camp	Landžo, Esad	Sentenced by ICTY				Yes	10 March 1997	15 years	8 April 2003	Served his sentence in Finland. Early release on 2 May 2006.	IT-96-21
Republic of Bosnia and Herzegovina	Čelebići camp	Delalić, Zejnil	Acquitted					10 March 1997	Found not guilty.	20 February 2001		IT-96-21
Republic of Serb Krajina	RSK	Babić, Milan	Sentenced by ICTY		Yes			Pleaded guilty to persecutions	13 years	18 July 2005	Committed suicide in prison in the United Kingdom on 5 March 2006.	IT-03-72
Republic of Serb Krajina	RSK	Martić, Milan	Sentenced by ICTY		Yes	Yes		13 December 2005	35 years	8 October 2008	Serving the sentence in Estonia.	IT-95-11
Republika Srpska		Blagojević, Vidoje	Sentenced by ICTY		Yes	Yes		14 May 2003	15 years	9 May 2007	Served his sentence in Norway. Early release on 22 December 2012.	IT-02-60
Republika Srpska		Jokić, Dragan	Sentenced by ICTY		Yes	Yes		14 May 2003	9 years	9 May 2007	Served his sentence in Austria. Early release on 13 January 2010.	IT-02-60
Republika Srpska	Krajina	Brđanin, Radoslav	Sentenced by ICTY		Yes	Yes	Yes	23 January 2002	30 years	3 April 2007	Served the sentence in Denmark. Early release on 3 September 2022 on medical grounds. Died on 7 September 2022.	IT-99-36
Republika Srpska	Krajina	Talić, Momir	Died during the trial					23 January 2002			Died 28 May 2003. Proceedings terminated 12 June 2003.	IT-99-36/1
Republika Srpska	Brčko	Češić, Ranko	Sentenced by ICTY		Yes	Yes		Pleaded guilty to all charges	18 years	11 March 2004	Served his sentence in Denmark. Early release on 25 May 2014.	IT-95-10/1
Republika Srpska	Brčko	Jelisić, Goran	Sentenced by ICTY		Yes	Yes		Pleaded guilty to fifteen counts of crimes against humanity and sixteen counts of violations of the law or customs of war	40 years	5 July 2001	Serving the sentence in Belgium.	IT-95-10
Republika Srpska	Srebrenica-Drina Corps	Krstić, Radislav	Sentenced by ICTY	Yes	Yes	Yes		13 March 2000	35 years	19 April 2004	Serving the sentence in Estonia since 2025.	IT-98-33
Republic of Bosnia and Herzegovina		Delić, Rasim	Sentenced by ICTY			Yes		9 July 2007	3 years	15 September 2008	Died on 16 April 2010, while on provisional release. The Appeals Chamber terminated the appellate proceedings and announced that the Trial Chamber judgement should be considered as final.	IT-04-83
Republika Srpska	Glogova	Deronjić, Miroslav	Sentenced by ICTY		Yes			Pleaded guilty to persecutions	10 years	20 July 2005	Died in prison in Sweden on 19 May 2007	IT-02-61
Serbia and Montenegro	Kosovo	Đorđević, Vlastimir	Sentenced by ICTY		Yes	Yes		27 January 2009	18 years	27 January 2014	Serving sentence in Germany.	IT-05-87/1
Republika Srpska	Pilica Farm	Erdemović, Dražen	Sentenced by ICTY			Yes		Pleaded guilty to murder as a violation of the laws or customs of war	5 years	5 March 1998	Served his sentence in Norway. Early release on 13 August 1999.	IT-96-22
Republika Srpska		Galić, Stanislav	Sentenced by ICTY		Yes	Yes		3 December 2001	Life imprisonment.	30 November 2006	Serving the sentence in Germany.	IT-98-29
Republic of Bosnia and Herzegovina	Central Bosnia	Hadžihasanović, Enver	Sentenced by ICTY			Yes		2 December 2003	3 1/2 years	22 April 2008	Released on 23 April 2008 upon completion of his sentence.	IT-01-47
Republic of Bosnia and Herzegovina	Central Bosnia	Kubura, Amir	Sentenced by ICTY			Yes		2 December 2003	2 years	22 April 2008	Early release on 11 April 2006.	IT-01-47
Republic of Bosnia and Herzegovina	Central Bosnia	Alagić, Mehmed	Died during the trial					2 December 2003			Died on 7 March 2003. Proceedings terminated on 21 March 2003.	IT-01-47
Republic of Bosnia and Herzegovina	Grabovica-Uzdol	Halilović, Sefer	Acquitted					31 January 2005	Found not guilty.	16 October 2007	Immediately released.	IT-01-48
Kosovo Liberation Army		Haradinaj, Ramush	Acquitted					5 March 2007	Found not guilty.	29 November 2012	Immediately released.	IT-04-84
Kosovo Liberation Army		Balaj, Idriz	Acquitted					5 March 2007	Found not guilty.	29 November 2012	Immediately released.	IT-04-84
Kosovo Liberation Army		Brahimaj, Lahi	Sentenced by ICTY			Yes		5 March 2007	6 years	21 July 2010		IT-04-84
Republic of Macedonia		Boškoski, Ljube	Acquitted					16 April 2007	Found not guilty.	19 May 2010		IT-04-82 MICT-14-84
Republic of Macedonia		Tarčulovski, Johan	Sentenced by ICTY			Yes		16 April 2007	12 years	19 May 2010	Served his sentence in Germany. Early release on 8 April 2013.	IT-04-82 MICT-14-84
Republika Srpska	Foča	Kunarac, Dragoljub	Sentenced by ICTY		Yes	Yes		20 March 2000	28 years	12 June 2002	Serving the sentence in Germany.	IT-96-23 & 23/1
Republika Srpska	Foča	Kovač, Radomir	Sentenced by ICTY		Yes	Yes		20 March 2000	20 years	12 June 2002	Served his sentence in Norway. Early release on 30 June 2013.	IT-96-23 & 23/1
Republika Srpska	Foča	Vuković, Zoran	Sentenced by ICTY		Yes	Yes		20 March 2000	12 years	12 June 2002	Served his sentence in Norway. Early release on 11 March 2008.	IT-96-23 & 23/1
Republika Srpska	Foča	Krnojelac, Milorad	Sentenced by ICTY		Yes	Yes		30 October 2000	15 years	17 September 2003	Served his sentence in Italy. Early release on 9 July 2009.	IT-97-25
Republika Srpska	Foča	Zelenović, Dragan	Sentenced by ICTY		Yes	Yes		Pleaded guilty to seven counts of rape and torture	15 years	31 October 2007	Served his sentence in Belgium. Early release on 4 September 2015.	IT-96-23/2
Republika Srpska	Foča	Janjić, Janko	Died before trial								Indictment withdrawn on 20 April 2001.	IT-96-23/2
Republika Srpska	Foča	Gagović, Dragan	Died before trial								Died in 1999. Indictment withdrawn on 30 July 1999.	IT-96-23/2
Republika Srpska	Foča	Janković, Gojko	Transferred to national courts								Transferred to the State Court of Bosnia and Herzegovina on 8 December 2005. Sentenced to 34 years on 19 November 2007.	IT-96-23/2
Republika Srpska	Foča	Stanković, Radovan	Transferred to national courts								Transferred to the State Court of Bosnia and Herzegovina on 29 September 2005. Sentenced to 20 years on 28 March 2007.	IT-96-23/2
Republika Srpska	Foča	Rašević, Mitar	Transferred to national courts								Transferred to the State Court of Bosnia and Herzegovina on 3 October 2006. Sentenced to 8 1/2 years on 28 February 2008.	IT-97-25/1
Republika Srpska	Foča	Todović, Savo	Transferred to national courts								Transferred to the State Court of Bosnia and Herzegovina on 3 October 2006. Sentenced 12 1/2 years on 28 February 2008.	IT-97-25/1
Republika Srpska	Omarska, Keraterm & Trnopolje Camps	Kvočka, Miroslav	Sentenced by ICTY		Yes	Yes		28 February 2000	7 years	28 February 2005	Early release on 30 March 2005.	IT-98-30/1
Republika Srpska	Omarska, Keraterm & Trnopolje Camps	Prcać, Dragoljub	Sentenced by ICTY		Yes	Yes		28 February 2000	5 years	28 February 2005	Early release on 3 March 2005.	IT-98-30/1
Republika Srpska	Omarska, Keraterm & Trnopolje Camps	Radić, Mlađo	Sentenced by ICTY		Yes	Yes		28 February 2000	20 years	28 February 2005	Served his sentence in France. Early release on 31 December 2012.	IT-98-30/1
Republika Srpska	Omarska, Keraterm & Trnopolje Camps	Žigić, Zoran	Sentenced by ICTY		Yes	Yes		28 February 2000	25 years	28 February 2005	Served his sentence in Austria. Early release on 16 December 2014.	IT-98-30/1
Republika Srpska	Omarska, Keraterm & Trnopolje Camps	Kos, Milojica	Sentenced by ICTY		Yes	Yes		28 February 2000	6 years	2 November 2001	Early release on 30 July 2002.	IT-98-30/1
Kosovo Liberation Army	Lapušnik camp	Limaj, Fatmir	Acquitted					15 November 2004	Found not guilty.	27 September 2007	Immediately released.	IT-03-66
Kosovo Liberation Army	Lapušnik camp	Musliu, Isak	Acquitted					15 November 2004	Found not guilty.	27 September 2007	Immediately released.	IT-03-66
Kosovo Liberation Army	Lapušnik camp	Bala, Haradin	Sentenced by ICTY			Yes		15 November 2004	13 years	27 September 2007	Served his sentence in France. Early release on 31 December 2012.	IT-03-66
Kosovo Liberation Army	Lapušnik camp	Murtezi, Agim	Indictment withdrawn									IT-03-66
Republika Srpska	Višegrad	Vasiljević, Mitar	Sentenced by ICTY		Yes	Yes		10 September 2001	15 years	25 February 2004	Served his sentence in Austria. Early release on 12 March 2010.	IT-98-32
Republika Srpska	Višegrad	Lukić, Milan	Sentenced by ICTY		Yes	Yes		9 July 2008	Life imprisonment.	4 December 2012	Serving the sentence in Estonia.	IT-98-32/1
Republika Srpska	Višegrad	Lukić, Sredoje	Sentenced by ICTY		Yes	Yes		9 July 2008	27 years	4 December 2012	Serving the sentence in Norway.	IT-98-32/1
Republika Srpska	Sarajevo	Milošević, Dragomir	Sentenced by ICTY		Yes	Yes		11 January 2007	29 years	12 November 2009	Serving the sentence in Estonia.	IT-98-29/1
Republika Srpska	Vlašić Mountain	Mrđa, Darko	Sentenced by ICTY		Yes	Yes		Pleaded guilty to murder and inhumane acts	17 years	31 March 2004	Served his sentence in Spain. Early release on 10 October 2013.	IT-02-59
Republic of Serb Krajina	Vukovar Hospital	Dokmanović, Slavko	Died during the trial					19 January 1998			Died 29 June 1998 at the ICTY Detention Unit.	IT-95-13a
Republic of Serb Krajina	Vukovar Hospital	Mrkšić, Mile	Sentenced by ICTY			Yes		11 October 2005	20 years	5 May 2009	Died in prison in Portugal on 16 August 2015.	IT-95-13/1
Serbia and Montenegro	Vukovar Hospital	Šljivančanin, Veselin	Sentenced by ICTY			Yes		11 October 2005	10 years	5 May 2009	Early release on 5 July 2011.	IT-95-13/1
Serbia and Montenegro	Vukovar Hospital	Radić, Miroslav	Acquitted					11 October 2005	Found not guilty.	27 September 2007		IT-95-13/1
Serbia and Montenegro		Šešelj, Vojislav	Sentenced by IRMCT		Yes			27 November 2006	10 years	11 April 2018	Sentence was declared served in view of the credit for the time he spent in detention in custody of the ICTY pending trial.	IT-03-67 MICT-16-99
Republika Srpska	Sušica Camp	Nikolić, Dragan	Sentenced by ICTY		Yes			Pleaded guilty to all charges	20 years	4 February 2005	Early release effective 20 August 2013.	IT-94-2
Republika Srpska	Srebrenica	Nikolić, Momir	Sentenced by ICTY		Yes			Pleaded guilty to persecutions	20 years	8 March 2006	Early release effective 1 July 2014.	IT-02-60/1
Republika Srpska	Srebrenica	Obrenović, Dragan	Sentenced by ICTY		Yes			Pleaded guilty to persecutions	17 years	10 December 2003	Early release on 21 September 2011.	IT-02-60/2
Republika Srpska	Srebrenica	Popović, Vujadin	Sentenced by ICTY	Yes	Yes	Yes		21 August 2006	Life imprisonment	30 January 2015	Serving the sentence in Germany.	IT-05-88
Republika Srpska	Srebrenica	Beara, Ljubiša	Sentenced by ICTY	Yes	Yes	Yes		21 August 2006	Life imprisonment	30 January 2015	Died in German prison on 8 February 2017.	IT-05-88
Republika Srpska	Srebrenica	Nikolić, Drago	Sentenced by ICTY	Yes	Yes	Yes		21 August 2006	35 years	30 January 2015	Died on 11 October 2015 while on provisional release.	IT-05-88
Republika Srpska	Srebrenica	Miletić, Radivoje	Sentenced by ICTY		Yes	Yes		21 August 2006	18 years	30 January 2015	Serving the sentence in Finland.	IT-05-88
Republika Srpska	Srebrenica	Pandurević, Vinko	Sentenced by ICTY		Yes	Yes		21 August 2006	13 years	30 January 2015	Early release on 9 April 2015.	IT-05-88
Republika Srpska	Srebrenica	Borovčanin, Ljubomir	Sentenced by ICTY		Yes	Yes		21 August 2006	17 years	10 June 2010	Served his sentence in Denmark. Early release effective 1 August 2016.	IT-05-88
Republika Srpska	Srebrenica	Gvero, Milan	Sentenced by ICTY		Yes			21 August 2006	5 years	10 June 2010	Early release on 28 June 2010. Died 17 February 2013 during the appellate proceedings.	IT-05-88
Republika Srpska	Srebrenica	Tolimir, Zdravko	Sentenced by ICTY	Yes	Yes	Yes		26 February 2010	Life imprisonment	8 April 2015	Died on 8 February 2016 while awaiting transfer to prison.	IT-05-88/2
Republika Srpska	Srebrenica	Trbić, Milorad	Transferred to national courts								Transferred to the State Court of Bosnia and Herzegovina on 11 June 2007. Sentenced to 30 years.	IT-05-88/1
Serbia and Montenegro		Milutinović, Milan	Acquitted					10 July 2006	Found not guilty.	26 February 2009		IT-05-87
Serbia and Montenegro		Ojdanić, Dragoljub	Sentenced by ICTY		Yes			10 July 2006	15 years	26 February 2009	Early release on 10 July 2013.	IT-05-87
Serbia and Montenegro		Šainović, Nikola	Sentenced by ICTY		Yes	Yes		10 July 2006	18 years	23 January 2014	Served his sentence in Sweden. Early release on 10 July 2015.	IT-05-87
Serbia and Montenegro		Pavković, Nebojša	Sentenced by ICTY		Yes	Yes		10 July 2006	22 years	23 January 2014	Served the sentence in Finland. Died on 20 October 2025, while on provisional release.	IT-05-87
Serbia and Montenegro		Lazarević, Vladimir	Sentenced by ICTY		Yes			10 July 2006	14 years	23 January 2014	Early release on 7 September 2015.	IT-05-87
Serbia and Montenegro		Lukić, Sreten	Sentenced by ICTY		Yes	Yes		10 July 2006	20 years	23 January 2014	Served the sentence in Poland. Early release on 10 October 2021.	IT-05-87
Republika Srpska	Keraterm Camp	Sikirica, Duško	Sentenced by ICTY		Yes			19 March 2001	15 years (Pleaded guilty.)	13 November 2001	Served his sentence in Austria. Early release on 21 June 2010.	IT-95-8
Republika Srpska	Keraterm Camp	Došen, Damir	Sentenced by ICTY		Yes			19 March 2001	5 years (Pleaded guilty.)	13 November 2001	Served his sentence in Austria. Early release on 28 February 2003.	IT-95-8
Republika Srpska	Keraterm Camp	Kolundžija, Dragan	Sentenced by ICTY		Yes			19 March 2001	3 years (Pleaded guilty.)	13 November 2001	Early release on 5 December 2001.	IT-95-8
Republika Srpska	Keraterm Camp	Timarac, Nedjeljko	Indictment withdrawn								Indictment withdrawn on 5 May 1998.	IT-95-8
Republika Srpska	Keraterm Camp	Lajić, Goran	Indictment withdrawn								Indictment withdrawn on 5 May 1998.	IT-95-8
Republika Srpska	Keraterm Camp	Kondić, Dragan	Indictment withdrawn								Indictment withdrawn on 5 May 1998.	IT-95-8
Republika Srpska	Keraterm Camp	Šaponja, Dragomir	Indictment withdrawn								Indictment withdrawn on 5 May 1998.	IT-95-8
Republika Srpska	Keraterm Camp	Janjić, Nikica	Died before trial								The indictment against Janjić was withdrawn after his death.	IT-95-8
Republika Srpska	Bosanski Šamac	Simić, Milan	Sentenced by ICTY		Yes			Pleaded guilty to torture	5 years	17 October 2002	Early release effective 3 November 2003.	IT-95-9/2
Republika Srpska	Bosanski Šamac	Todorović, Stevan	Sentenced by ICTY		Yes			Pleaded guilty to persecutions	10 years	31 July 2001	Served the sentence in Spain. Early release on 22 June 2005. Died 3 September 2006.	IT-95-9/1
Republika Srpska	Bosanski Šamac	Simić, Blagoje	Sentenced by ICTY		Yes			10 September 2001	15 years	28 November 2006	Served the sentence in the United Kingdom. Early release on 16 March 2011.	IT-95-9
Republika Srpska	Bosanski Šamac	Tadić, Miroslav	Sentenced by ICTY		Yes			10 September 2001	8 years	17 October 2003	Early release effective 4 November 2004.	IT-95-9
Republika Srpska	Bosanski Šamac	Zarić, Simo	Sentenced by ICTY		Yes			10 September 2001	6 years	17 October 2003	Early release effective 28 January 2004.	IT-95-9
Republika Srpska	Bosanski Šamac	Miljković, Slobodan	Died before trial								Died 8 August 1998. Indictment withdrawn on 8 August 1998.	IT-95-9
Republika Srpska	Bosnia and Herzegovina	Plavšić, Biljana	Sentenced by ICTY		Yes			Pleaded guilty to persecutions	11 years	27 February 2003	Served her sentence in Sweden. Early release 27 October 2009.	IT-00-39 & 40/1
Republika Srpska	Bosnia and Herzegovina	Krajišnik, Momčilo	Sentenced by ICTY		Yes			3 February 2004	20 years	17 March 2009	Served the sentence in the United Kingdom. Early release on 30 August 2013.	IT-00-39
Republika Srpska	Bosnia and Herzegovina	Stanišić, Mićo	Sentenced by ICTY		Yes	Yes		14 September 2009	22 years	30 June 2016	Serving the sentence in Poland.	IT-08-91
Republika Srpska	Bosnia and Herzegovina	Župljanin, Stojan	Sentenced by ICTY		Yes	Yes		14 September 2009	22 years	30 June 2016	Serving the sentence in Poland.	IT-08-91
Serbia and Montenegro	Dubrovnik	Jokić, Miodrag	Sentenced by ICTY			Yes		Pleaded guilty to all charge	7 years	30 August 2005	Served his sentence in Denmark. Early release on 1 September 2008.	IT-01-42/1
Serbia and Montenegro	Dubrovnik	Strugar, Pavle	Sentenced by ICTY			Yes		16 December 2003	8 years	17 July 2008	Early release on 20 February 2009.	IT-01-42
Serbia and Montenegro	Dubrovnik	Zec, Milan	Indictment withdrawn								Indictment withdrawn on 26 July 2002.	IT-01-42
Serbia and Montenegro	Dubrovnik	Kovačević, Vladimir	Transferred to national courts								On 17 November 2006, the case was referred to Serbia. Kovačević was charged by Serbia, but was found unfit for trial due to poor health.	IT-01-42/2
Republika Srpska	Prijedor	Stakić, Milomir	Sentenced by ICTY		Yes	Yes		16 April 2002	40 years	22 March 2006	Serving the sentence in France.	IT-97-24
Republika Srpska	Prijedor	Tadić, Duško	Sentenced by ICTY		Yes	Yes	Yes	7 May 1996	20 years	26 January 2000	Early release on 17 July 2008.	IT-94-1
Republika Srpska	Prijedor	Borovnica, Goran	Died before trial								Went missing in 1995 and declared officially dead on 22 November 1996. Indictment withdrawn in April 2005.	IT-94-1
Republika Srpska	Prijedor	Drljača, Simo	Died before trial								Died before transfer to the Tribunal.	IT-97-24
Republika Srpska	Prijedor	Kovačević, Milan	Died during the trial					6 July 1998			Died 1 August 1998 at the ICTY Detention Unit. Proceedings terminated 24 August 1998.	IT-97-24
Republic of Croatia	Operation Storm	Čermak, Ivan	Acquitted					11 March 2008	Found not guilty.	15 April 2011		IT-06-90
Republic of Croatia	Operation Storm	Gotovina, Ante	Acquitted					11 March 2008	Found not guilty.	16 November 2012		IT-06-90
Republic of Croatia	Operation Storm	Markač, Mladen	Acquitted					11 March 2008	Found not guilty.	16 November 2012		IT-06-90
Serbia and Montenegro		Perišić, Momčilo	Acquitted					2 October 2008	Found not guilty.	28 February 2013		IT-04-81
Republic of Bosnia and Herzegovina		Orić, Naser	Acquitted					6 October 2004	Found not guilty.	3 July 2008		IT-03-68
Republic of Croatia	Medak Pocket	Bobetko, Janko	Died before trial								Died 29 April 2003. Proceedings terminated 24 June 2003	IT-02-62
Republic of Croatia	Medak Pocket	Ademi, Rahim	Transferred to national courts								Transferred to Croatia on 1 November 2005. Acquitted of all charges by the Zagreb District Court.	IT-04-78
Republic of Croatia	Medak Pocket	Norac, Mirko	Transferred to national courts								Transferred to Croatia on 1 November 2005. Sentenced by the Zagreb District Court to 7 years.	IT-04-78
Republika Srpska	Omarska and Keraterm Camps	Banović, Predrag	Sentenced by ICTY		Yes			Pleaded guilty to persecutions	8 years	28 October 2003	Served his sentence in France. Early release on 3 September 2008	IT-02-65/1
Republika Srpska	Omarska and Keraterm Camps	Mejakić, Željko	Transferred to national courts								Case referred to Bosnia and Herzegovina. Sentenced to 21 years.	IT-02-65
Republika Srpska	Omarska and Keraterm Camps	Gruban, Momčilo	Transferred to national courts								Case referred to Bosnia and Herzegovina. Sentenced to 7 years.	IT-02-65
Republika Srpska	Omarska and Keraterm Camps	Fuštar, Dušan	Transferred to national courts								Case referred to Bosnia and Herzegovina. Sentenced to 9 years.	IT-02-65
Republika Srpska	Omarska and Keraterm Camps	Knežević, Duško	Transferred to national courts								Case referred to Bosnia and Herzegovina. Sentenced to 31 years.	IT-02-65
Republika Srpska	Omarska and Keraterm Camps	Govedarica, Zdravko	Indictment withdrawn								Indictment withdrawn on 8 May 1998.	IT-02-65
Republika Srpska	Omarska and Keraterm Camps	Gruban (first name unknown). The fictional character. Indeed, Gruban is already the first name, and the unknown surname is Malić.	Indictment withdrawn								Indictment withdrawn on 8 May 1998.	IT-02-65
Republika Srpska	Omarska and Keraterm Camps	Kostić, Predrag	Indictment withdrawn								Indictment withdrawn on 8 May 1998.	IT-02-65
Republika Srpska	Omarska and Keraterm Camps	Paspalj, Nedjeljko	Indictment withdrawn								Indictment withdrawn on 8 May 1998.	IT-02-65
Republika Srpska	Omarska and Keraterm Camps	Pavlić, Milan	Indictment withdrawn								Indictment withdrawn on 8 May 1998.	IT-02-65
Republika Srpska	Omarska and Keraterm Camps	Popović, Milutin	Indictment withdrawn								Indictment withdrawn on 8 May 1998.	IT-02-65
Republika Srpska	Omarska and Keraterm Camps	Predojević, Draženko	Indictment withdrawn								Indictment withdrawn on 8 May 1998.	IT-02-65
Republika Srpska	Omarska and Keraterm Camps	Savić, Željko	Indictment withdrawn								Indictment withdrawn on 8 May 1998.	IT-02-65
Republika Srpska	Omarska and Keraterm Camps	Babić, Mirko	Indictment withdrawn								Indictment withdrawn on 8 May 1998.	IT-02-65
Republika Srpska	Omarska and Keraterm Camps	Banović, Nenad	Indictment withdrawn								Indictment withdrawn on 8 May 1998.	IT-02-65
Republika Srpska		Đukić, Đorđe	Died before trial								Transferred to ICTY on 12 February 1996. Released 24 April 1996 on grounds of ill health. Died on 18 May 1996.	IT-96-20
Serbia and Montenegro		Ražnatović, Željko "Arkan"	Died before trial								Died in Belgrade in January 2000.	IT-97-27
Serbia and Montenegro	Kosovo, Croatia and Bosnia	Milošević, Slobodan	Died during the trial					12 February 2002			Died on 11 March 2006. Proceedings terminated on 14 March 2006.	IT-02-54
Republic of Serb Krajina		Hadžić, Goran	Died during the trial					16 October 2012			Declared unfit to stand trial on 24 March 2016. Proceedings stayed indefinitely until his death on 12 July 2016. Proceedings terminated on 22 July 2016.	IT-04-75
Serbia and Montenegro		Simatović, Franko	Sentenced by IRMCT		Yes	Yes		9 June 2009	15 years	31 May 2023	Released on 29 August 2023 due to seriously deteriorating health.	IT-03-69 MICT-15-96
Serbia and Montenegro		Stanišić, Jovica	Sentenced by IRMCT		Yes	Yes		9 June 2009	15 years	31 May 2023	Serving the sentence in Germany.	IT-03-69 MICT-15-96

== See also ==
- Trial of Slobodan Milošević
- Trial of Ratko Mladić
- Trial of Radovan Karadžić
- Trial of Stanislav Galić
- Trial of Milan Martić
- List of people indicted in the International Criminal Tribunal for Rwanda
