= O-Gon Kwon =

South Korean judge (born 1953)

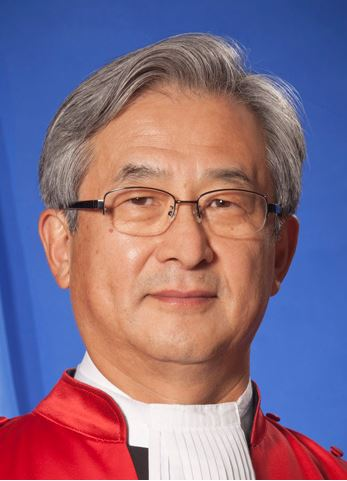

Member of Board of Directors of the Trust Fund for Victims
- Incumbent
- Assumed office 2025
- Appointed by: Assembly of States Parties
- Preceded by: Tareque Muhammad

President of the Assembly of States Parties of the International Criminal Court
- In office 2017–2021
- Appointed by: Assembly of States Parties
- Preceded by: Sidiki Kaba
- Succeeded by: Silvia Fernández de Gurmendi

Vice-President of the International Criminal Tribunal for the former Yugoslavia
- In office 17 November 2008 – 17 November 2011
- Preceded by: Kevin Parker
- Succeeded by: Carmel Agius

Judge of the International Criminal Tribunal for the former Yugoslavia
- In office 17 November 2001 – 31 March 2016
- Appointed by: United Nations General Assembly

Personal details
- Born: 2 September 1953 (age 72) Cheongju, South Korea
- Education: Seoul National University LL.B., LL.M. Harvard Law School LL.M.

- O-Gon Kwon
- Hangul: 권오곤
- Hanja: 權五坤
- RR: Gwon Ogon
- MR: Kwŏn Ogon

O-Gon Kwon (Korean: 권오곤; Hanja: 權五坤; born 2 September 1953) is a South Korean jurist, best known for being one of the three judges in the trial of Slobodan Milošević. He also sat on the bench for the trial of former Bosnian Serb leader Radovan Karadžić. He served as President of the Assembly of States Parties to the Rome Statute of the ICC, and since December 2025 is member of the Board of Directors of the Trust Fund for Victims at the International Criminal Court.

== Early life and education ==
Kwon holds an LL.B. (1976) and an LL.M. (1983) from Seoul National University. He took his Bar Apprenticeship in the Judicial Research and Training Institute at the Supreme Court of Korea (1979). Judge Kwon also holds an LL.M. (1985) from Harvard Law School. He received a "Moran" National Order of Merit from the President of South Korea in September 2008.

== Career ==
A domestic and international judge, O-Gwon has served also in key legal advisory, political and administrative positions in Korea and at the international level.

=== In Korea ===
A judge at the Seoul District Court in 1979 and 1980, Kwon became Assistant Legal Advisor to President Chun Doo-hwan of Korea, a position he held until 1984. Between 1986 and 1990, he was a judge at the Seoul Criminal District Court and Judge at the Daegu High Court. From 1990 to 1992, Judge Kwon was Planning Director at the Ministry of Court Administration. From 1992 to 1993, he was a Research Judge at the Supreme Court of Korea. Between 1993 and 1999, he served as a Presiding Judge, successively in the Changwon, Suwon, and Seoul District Courts. In the meantime, he also served as director of research at the Constitutional Court of Korea from 1997 to 1999. He was a Presiding Judge at the Daegu High Court when elected as a Judge of the ICTY by the UN General Assembly.

=== International Tribunal for the former Yugoslavia ===
The International Criminal Tribunal for the former Yugoslavia (ICTY) is an entity which is chartered as a court of law by the United Nations to investigate and prosecute war crimes, which occurred throughout the Balkans in the 1990s. The Tribunal adjudicated conflict atrocities such as ethnic cleansing, war crimes, genocide, and crimes against humanity. In 2001, O-Gon Kwon was sworn in as Judge of the Tribunal on 17 November. As one of the Tribunal's judges his responsibilities included determining the guilt or innocence of those accused of perpetrating war crimes during the Balkan conflict, and he was tasked with passing sentence on the convicted.

At the ICTY, Kwon served on the bench which heard the trial of Slobodan Milošević, and has also been involved in several pre-trial proceedings, contempt trials and sentencing judgments. Judge Kwon also sat on the bench hearing the case of Prosecutor v. Popović et al. He was also a member of the Referral Bench, which determines whether certain cases pending before the Tribunal are suitable to be referred for trial in national courts. In addition, he is a member of the Tribunal's Rules Committee, which is charged with proposing additions and modifications to the Rules of Procedure and Evidence.

By virtue of a mandate (elected by his peers), he became Vice-President of the International Criminal Tribunal for the former Yugoslavia in November 2008. Kwon was re-elected to a new two-year term as Vice-President in November 2009.

==== Prosecutor v. Popović et al ====
Judge Kwon heard the case of Prosecutor v. Popović et al. The ICTY judges agreed to join the nine defendant's trials linked to the Srebrenica massacre, who were all senior Bosnian Serb army, VRS, and police officers. Vujadin Popović - indicted for genocide, conspiracy to commit genocide, extermination, murder, persecutions, forcible transfer, deportation. Others under concurrent indictment in this case with the same or similar charges are Ljubiša Beara, Ljubomir Borovcanin, Milan Gvero, Radivoje Miletic, Drago Nikolić, Vinko Pandurević, Zdravko Tolimir and Milorad Trbić.

==== Presiding Judge for Prosecutor v. Radovan Karadžić ====
Judge Kwon served as the presiding judge for the case of former Bosnian Serb leader, Radovan Karadžić, and handed him a 40 year sentence on 24 March 2016.

=== International Criminal Court ===
==== Independent Panel on Judicial Elections ====
In 2011, Kwon was elected by the Coalition for the International Criminal Court (CICC) as one of the five members in the Independent Panel on International Criminal Court Judicial Elections. The panel is the predecessor of the officially established Advisory Committee on Nominations of the Assembly of States Parties.

==== President of the Assembly of States Parties ====
On 4 December 2017, Kwon was elected President of the Assembly of States Parties for the seventeenth to nineteenth sessions of the Assembly, a function he commenced on 14 December 2017. Kwon is the 6th individual holding this post, and the second from the Asia-Pacific region. In December 2020, he was succeeded by the 7th President of the Assembly, the Argentinean Silvia Fernandez de Gurmendi.List of presidents and vice-presidents of the Assembly of States Parties of the International Criminal Court

During his term, he led the process of launching the review of the ICC through an independent expert panel appointed by the Assembly. He also led the Assembly during the first year of the COVID lock-down, and the responses to the sanctions imposed on ICC officials, by the first Trump Administration.

==== Advisory Committee on Nominations ====
Established in 2011 and operating for the first time for the 2014 judicial elections, the Advisory Committee on Nominations (ACN) is an independent subsidiary organ of the Assembly of States Parties to the Rome Statute mandated to facilitate that the highest-qualified individuals are appointed as judges of the International Criminal Court. The ACN is composed of 9 members elected by the ASP for a 3-year term renewable only once. At its twenty-third session, on 2 December 2024, the Assembly, on the recommendation of the Bureau, appointed Kwon as one of the nine members of the ACN a three-year term commencing on 9 December 2024.

==== Trust Fund for Victims, Board of Directors ====
Established by the Assembly of States Parties in 2002, pursuant to Article 79 of the Rome Statute, the Trust Fund for Victims is mandated to mobilise resources for the benefit of victims, make visible the plight of victims, and design and implement programmes for the benefit of victims of crimes under jurisdiction of the ICC, and of their families.

On 1 December 2025, O-Gon Kwon was elected by acclamation as member of the Board of Directors in the seat for the Asia and Pacific region for the period 2025-2028, filling in the vacancy left by the resignation of Tareque Muhammad (Bangladesh) who had been elected for the term 2024-2028.

=== Other affiliations ===
Kwon has served as a member of the Board of Editors of the Journal of International Criminal Justice (Oxford) since 2007. He is a member of the Crimes Against Humanity Initiative Advisory Council, a project of the Whitney R. Harris World Law Institute at Washington University School of Law in St. Louis to establish the world’s first treaty on the prevention and punishment of crimes against humanity.

== Career history ==
- 1979–1980 Seoul District Court judge
- 1979–1984 Assistant Legal Advisor to the President of the Republic of Korea
- 1986–1990 Seoul Criminal District Court Judge and Judge at the Daegu High Court
- 1992–1993 Research Judge at the Supreme Court of Korea
- 1993–1999 Presiding Judge Seoul District Courts
- 1997–1999 Director of Research at the Constitutional Court of Korea
- 2001 Presiding Judge at the Daegu High Court
- 2001–2016 Elected Judge of the ICTY by the UN General Assembly
- 2008–2011 Vice-President of the ICTY
- 2017–2020 President of the Assembly of States Parties to the Rome Statute of the ICC
- 2025–2028 Member of the Board of Directors of the Trust Fund for Victims at the International Criminal Court

== Qualifications ==
- LL.B. (1976) Seoul National University Faculty of Law, Valedictorian
- LL.M. (1983) Seoul National University Graduate School of Law
- Passed the Korean Bar with the highest score (1977)
- Took Bar Apprenticeship in the Judicial Research and Training Institute at the Supreme Court of Korea (1979).
- LL.M. (1985) Harvard Law School
- Kwon, O-Gon, The Challenge of an International Criminal Trial as Seen from the Bench (May 2007). Journal of International Criminal Justice, Vol. 5, Issue 2, pp. 360–376, 2007 Kwon, O-G. (2007). "The Challenge of an International Criminal Trial as Seen from the Bench". Journal of International Criminal Justice. 5 (2): 360–376. doi:10.1093/jicj/mql094.

== Awards ==
- 2008: "Moran" National Order of Merit from the President of the Republic of Korea.
- 2018: Kyung-Ahm Prize, Kyung-Ahm Education & Cultural Foundation
