= Dragan Obrenović =

Former Bosnian Serb army officer

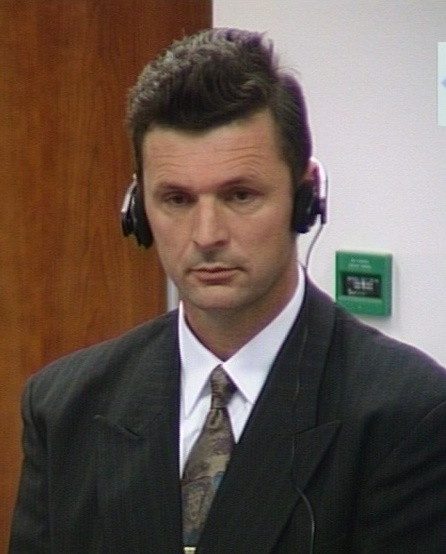
- Obrenovic at his ICTY trial
- Born: April 12, 1963 (age 63); Rogatica, Yugoslavia
- Criminal charges: Persecution
- Penalty: 17 years

Dragan Obrenović (born 12 April 1963) is a former Bosnian Serb senior officer and commander in the Yugoslav People's Army (JNA) and the Bosnian Serb Army (VRS).

In 2001, Obrenović was indicted for war crimes and crimes against humanity by the International Criminal Tribunal for the former Yugoslavia (ICTY) in The Hague for his involvement in implementation of the VRS leadership's plan to kill the mostly Bosniak civilians and prisoners of war in the Srebrenica genocide during the Bosnian War in July 1995.

In 2003, Obrenović pleaded guilty to one of the counts of persecution and in exchange agreed to allocute to his crime and witness for the prosecution he was sentenced to 17 years in prison. He served out his sentence in Norway and would be eligible for release in April 2018. He was released by orders from the ICTY in 2012 for good behaviour. The decision to release him was made in September 2011 but was kept a secret until May 2012. He was deported from Norway in 2012, after his release from prison.

== Early life and education ==
Obrenović was born on 12 April 1963 in the village of Rogatica on Matino Brdo, in the Rogatica municipality in eastern Bosnia and Herzegovina. He attended primary school in Rogatica and secondary school at a military gymnasium in Belgrade. Upon graduation at age of 18, Obrenović attended the military academy for ground forces of the JNA, specializing in armored and mechanized units. He graduated in 1986 at the age of 23, receiving a commission as an officer.

== Career ==
Obrenović's first assignment was a tank platoon command at the Jastrebarsko garrison in Croatia. After six months he was promoted to tank company commander in the same brigade. This post he held until 1990 when he was promoted to deputy command of the armored battalion. In October 1991, during the Croatian War of Independence, the JNA started its withdrawal from Croatia and Obrenović's unit was relocated to the Dubrava Airport in Tuzla, Bosnia and Herzegovina, where he was promoted to acting commander of the armored battalion. On 28 February 1992, his battalion was relocated to Mali Zvornik and Zvornik when the situation in Bosnia and Herzegovina began to deteriorate as well.

=== Role in the Yugoslav wars ===
==== JNA attack on Zvornik ====
In early April 1992, with the international community rapidly approaching recognition of the independence of the Republic of Bosnia and Herzegovina along former Yugoslav leader Josip Broz Tito's old boundaries, Serbia-controlled JNA forces began preparations to invade and conduct ethnic cleansing campaigns in the Bosanski Šamac, Prijedor, Vlasenica and Zvornik regions of the Drina Valley in Eastern Bosnia.

Until this point, the Bosnian Muslim (Bosniak) population in the city of Zvornik enjoyed a 59.4% majority. Captain Dragan Obrenović appeared on public radio to assure the citizens of that area that the JNA's only mandate was to protect all citizens of Yugoslavia: "There is no reason for panic. The JNA, as a legal military force, is here disable those that would eventually try to threaten the security of all citizens and the entire nation."

Five days later the JNA, including Obrenović's battalion, launched a massive simultaneous assault, starting with the attack by the Serb Volunteer Guard paramilitary forces on Bijeljina. The attacks soon spread to Foča, Zvornik, Bosanski Šamac, Vlasenica, Prijedor, Brčko, and was punctuated by the blockading of the Bosnian capital of Sarajevo to the southwest.

Non-Serbs had their property confiscated, were deported en masse, and many men of military age or of political, community, religious or cultural importance were murdered on sight or in mass executions in villages such as Kozarac, Gornja Grapska in Doboj, the Hotel Posavina in Brčko, the Crkvina warehouse in Bosanski Šamac, and detention centers such as the Brčko Partizan sports hall. Many other non-Serb men were interred at infamous concentration camps such as Omarska and Keraterm, while the women, children and elderly fled south toward the towns of Srebrenica and Žepa.

==== Transfer to the VRS ====
On 19 May 1992, two weeks after the JNA established a total blockade of the Bosnian capital and began the now-infamous Siege of Sarajevo, the JNA began withdrawing from Bosnia while personnel and equipment from the second military district remained behind to be absorbed into the forming Bosnian Serb rebel army. Obrenović's unit was relocated the following day to the garrison in the Vršac municipality in Serbia. On 1 December 1992 he was given orders to report to the newly formed Army of Republika Srpska (VRS).

Obrenović reported to Crna Rijeka, whereupon he was appointed acting Chief of Staff of the 1st Zvornik Infantry Brigade under the 17th VRS Corps at Tuzla. Initially, the armored vehicles still carried the emblems of the JNA and it was only later that they sported the Bosnian Serb flag and badges showing the Bosnian Serb coat-of-arms. At the same time, the members of the units - officers and soldiers alike - had been wearing Bosnian Serb badges on their uniforms from the beginning. In April 1993 Obrenović was promoted to the post of permanent Chief of Staff of 1st Zvornik Infantry Brigade.

On 16 April 1995 Obrenović was wounded in his left leg during combat operations. He was evacuated and underwent surgery as well as extensive post-operative treatment. A few months later, a commander and another officer visited him at his house while he was still on sick leave, asking him to interrupt his leave and return to brigade command, as preparations were under way to attack the besieged Srebrenica enclave, then designated a United Nations-protected "safe area". Srebrenica was a base of operations for largely ethnic Bosniak Army of the Republic of Bosnia and Herzegovina (ARBiH) 28th Mountain Division - an undisciplined, untrained, poorly armed and totally isolated Bosnian government force, now leaderless after Naser Orić and most of his staff left Srebrenica on the orders from Sarajevo. Obrenović returned to duty at Zvornik Brigade command on 1 July.

==== VRS attack on Srebrenica ====
Believing that the UN-protected enclaves of Srebrenica and Žepa were never demilitarized, and that they hid what amounted to "five or six brigades" of ARBiH troops and weapons, the VRS Main Staff ordered the Drina Corps command to undertake an operation codenamed Krivaja '95.

On 2 July 1995 Obrenović's brigade was given operational orders related to the operation. Detailed orders from Drina Corps regarding his brigade's involvement arrived later that same day. Obrenović drafted Zvornik Brigade deployment details, and a combat group of command and two battalions were set up. The 1st Battalion comprised the Podrinje attachment and the mobile combat group called Drina Wolves. The 2nd Battalion comprised one intervention platoon from all battalions except the fifth, then split into two companies. Captain Vinko Pandurević was in command of the whole brigade involvement. His deputy, Captain First Class Milan "Legenda" Jolović, commanded the Wolves.

===== Ambushes on the ARBiH/civilian exodus column =====
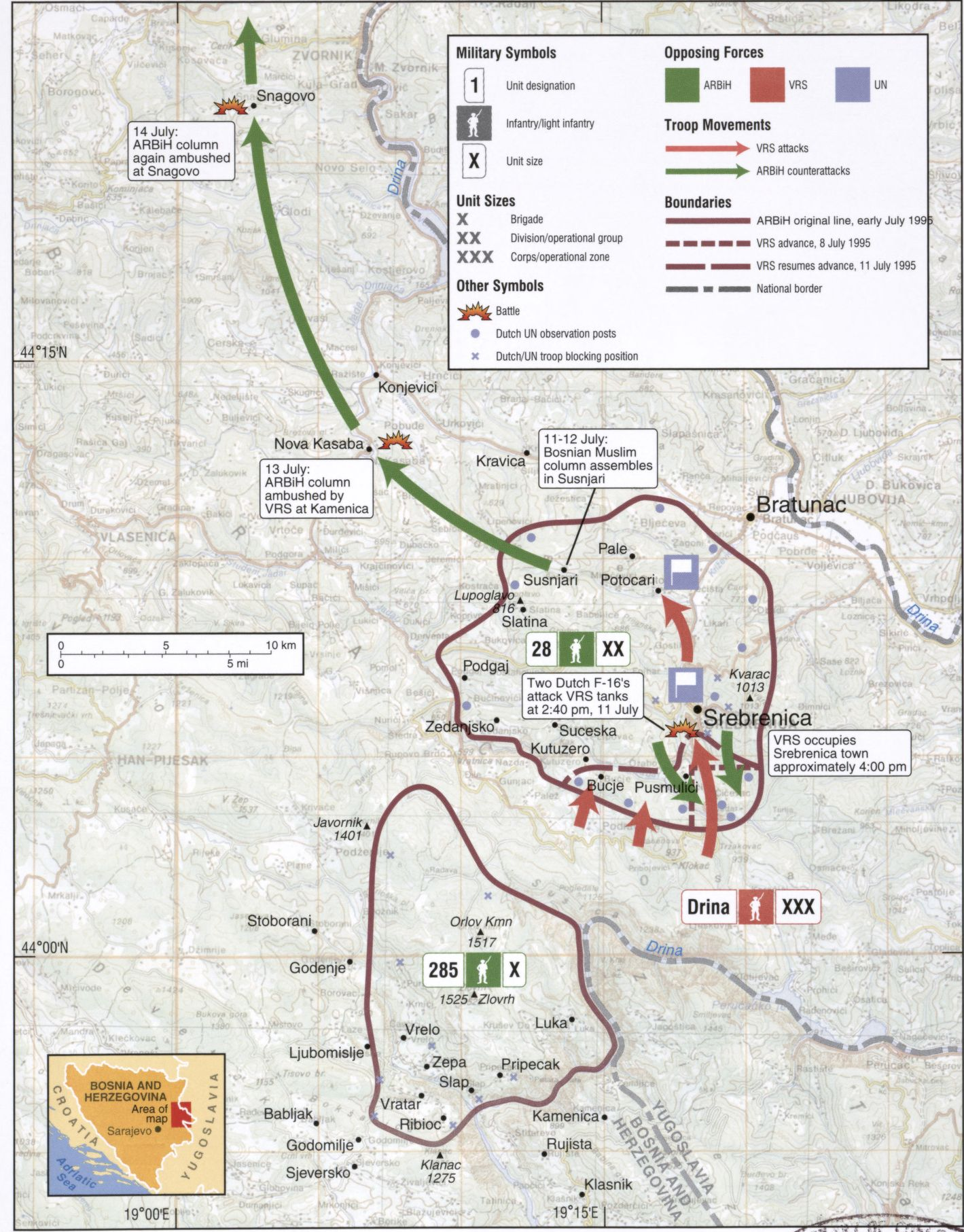
Map of the enclave attacks and the movements of the column

From 4 to 15 July 1995 Obrenović acted as deputy commander of the Zvornik Brigade while the commander was gone to Srebrenica during the assault. Obrenović later testified that he heard about fall of Srebrenica on 11 July. At 05:00 on 12 July Obrenović's Gucovo group reported communication intercepts indicating large foot column of Bosniaks had formed, comprising parts of the ARBiH 28th Division as well as thousands of desperate refugees, and was heading northeast toward the city of Tuzla in the Bosnian government-held territory.

At 07:00 Obrenović had a conversation with duty officer of Captain First Class Radika Petrović, commander of the 4th Battalion of the Bratunac Brigade who briefed him on the details of the column passing between his area near Buljin and the Milići Brigade. Obrenović had concerns that the customary travel vector might bring the column close to engaging with Zvornik Brigade forces just north of the village of Jaglići. Obrenović went to the 7th Battalion headquarters in Memići to deal with an impending attack by the ARBiH 2nd Corps from Tuzla.

Needing more information on this column, Obrenović sent his assistant commander for intelligence affairs, one Captain Vukotić, to the 4th Battalion command in the Kajica village in Šekovići, and asked him to seek direct details on this column. Two VRS units in the area meanwhile blockaded the column; one battalion of the Protection Regiment in Kasaba and part of the units of the 55th Engineering Battalion in Konjević Polje. One company from Zvornik MUP were also present with one more preparing to head there. Obrenović received orders from Drina Corps to assist traffic regulation in Konjević Polje, he sent a detachment of a half squad of traffic police to assist.

Later on he began receiving requests for trucks and buses for transport in Potočari, where thousands of unarmed Bosnians were captured by the Serb forces at the base of UN Dutchbat peacekeepers. He received more intel reports regarding the disposition of prisoners to be interrogated as well as predictions on movement of the column. Early on the evening of 12 April he got word from Vukotić that units of the 28th Division were carrying out a penetration and evacuation through this space and that practically the entire area was overwhelmed by people from this column. There was also a second VRS blockade in front of the column between Kravica, Konjević Polje and near an asphalt road in Nova Kasaba. Small groups (about 150 men) from column broke through and were reaching Glogova and Cerska, so Obrenović was tasked to take all necessary measures in order to protect the elements of combat deployment of the brigade as well as populated Serb villages in the territory of Zvornik.

At midnight on 12 July Obrenović set out with some units north of Liplje to organize an ambush of forward components of 28th Division. The ambush was laid, but no ARBiH units arrived. Leaving some troops at Snagovo, Obrenović and the rest returned to Zvornik. When he arrived at brigade headquarters, he was informed that the column had been stopped on the road from Kravica, Konjević Polje, to Milići, and that there were no troops in their area. Shortly thereafter he received word from intercept groups that chatter was picking up in the area stretching from Cerska toward Kamenica, despite Drina Corps' reassurance that there was no troop presence there. 28th Division radio intercepts showed that their security slipped up and the Serbs were able to learn that their numbers were 1,000-1,500 in that area. Later on 13 July Obrenović strengthened the units that had stayed up there providing the ambush, and he decided to organise a provisional unit, grouping squad and platoon from the units at his disposal: 15 soldiers from the engineers company, five or six soldiers from the staff command, and about 15 to 20 soldiers from the logistics battalion, a remaining platoon from the 5th Battalion, and an intervention platoon; this formed a unit with the strength of a company.

Captain Milan Marić from the operations sector was made commander. Obrenović sent the military police platoon to perform reconnaissance of the Drinjača River canyon by the village of Glodi, concluding that the column would likely use the two bridges there. An ambush team was assembled from military police platoon at Široki Put and the other at Džafin Kamen, another military platoon, and the rest of the ambush team from above the village of Liplje. The column, which also went through a mine field and artillery shelling, would be ambushed by the Drina Wolves near Nova Kasaba on 13 July and then again by the VRS near Snagovo the next day.

===== Mass executions =====
Around 19:00 on 13 July Obrenović was contacted by Lieutenant Drago Nikolić, security officer of the Zvornik Brigade, regarding prisoners being transported to Zvornik. Obrenović suggested the use of the Batković concentration camp to the north, and was told that the Red Cross and UNPROFOR knew about Batković, and these prisoners were to be shot and buried in the Zvornik area.

At 14:00 on 14 July Obrenović was at Snagovo when Major Zoran Jovanović brought in a reinforcement company, along with the information that Colonel Ljubiša Beara, officer in charge of the VRS security service, had transported an abnormally large number of prisoners in buses to Zvornik. That same day Obrenović overheard a call for two engineers to be released from battle lines to build a road; suspicious of someone doing the engineers a favor, Obrenović checked on the message and was told that the engineers were needed in Zvornik because of a task being carried out by Beara, Popović, and Nikolić. Obrenović knew that this must involve mass burials; he released the two engineers and ordered his aides to refrain from discussing the issue. Throughout the next days, Obrenović spent most of his time trying to find a solution for the column problem, but he also released further military police and infantry personnel from battle lines to assist with the execution of prisoners, and supplied earth moving machinery from his engineering battalions to dig mass graves.

Throughout the day on 14 July members of the Military Police Company of Obrenović's Zvornik Brigade guarded and blindfolded approximately 1,000 non-Serb men and boys detained at the school in Grbavci. In the early afternoon of 14 July 1995 VRS personnel transported these prisoners from the school at Grbavci to a nearby field, where personnel including members of the 4th Battalion of the Zvornik Brigade ordered the prisoners off the trucks and summarily executed them with automatic weapons. That night, members of the Zvornik Brigade Engineering Company used heavy equipment to bury the victims in mass graves at the execution site, while the executions continued. On the evening of 14 July lights from the engineering machinery illuminated the execution and burial sites during the executions.

In the early hours of 15 July 1995 VRS personnel from the Zvornik Brigade, including drivers and trucks from the 6th Infantry Battalion of the Zvornik Brigade, transported the surviving members of the group of approximately 1,000 prisoners from the school in Petkovci to an area below the Dam near Petkovci. They were assembled below the Dam and summarily executed by VRS or MUP soldiers with automatic weapons. VRS personnel from the Engineering Company of the Zvornik Brigade used excavators and other heavy equipment to bury the victims while the executions continued. Later that day, at Zvornik Brigade headquarters, Obrenović spoke with Chief of Operations Dragan Jokić briefly at 11:00 and discussed the problem with the burials of those executed and the guarding of prisoners still to be executed, as well as orders to not make records of any sort regarding the executions and burials.

Obrenović and his troops took part in three very fierce close quarters battles with the 28th Division during this time, and around 40 Serb troops were killed with over 100 wounded at Baljkovci, where the forward part of the column broke through the front line. Obrenović met with Colonel Dragomir Vasić and other officers. The idea was suggested of opening a corridor to Muslim territory and flushing the column and any stragglers towards it. It appealed to those present, to avoid casualties and relieve the threat the column posed on the security of Zvornik as well as the rear of their front lines. Attempts to discuss the matter with Obrenović's immediate superior on the phone were unsuccessful, and the General Radomir Miletić, acting Chief of General Staff of the VRS, rebuffed the idea and chastised Obrenović for using an insecure line. It was then that Obrenović was informed that General Radislav Krstić, Drina Corps deputy commander, was now the commander. Obrenović telephoned General Krstić and explained the threat to Zvornik that the 28th Division column posed. Krstić assured him that Pandurević, "Legenda" and his men were on their way to Zvornik.

Colonel Vasić related security problems with prisoners in Bratunac. Because of lack of space, prisoners captured in Srebrenica had to be housed overnight in parked buses; they grew agitated later in the night and began rocking the buses. Police Colonel Ljubomir Borovčanin, commanding officer of the Special Police Brigade, indicated dissatisfaction that civilian police were being used to guard buses in Bratunac, and was determined for that not to be the case with the prisoners in Zvornik. Special Police officer Miloš Stupar related that more than 1,000 prisoners packed into a warehouse in Kravica had rebelled, and one had killed a Serb guard, sparking an all-out Serb assault on the prisoners in the warehouse with grenades and automatic weapons fire, killing almost all of them.

Obrenović then spoke with his superior, Vinko Pandurević, who had just arrived at Zvornik Brigade headquarters. He briefed him about the execution operations, which were depleting both manpower and equipment resources and diluting their ability to deal with the column. He discussed issues regarding the burial of execution victims as well as the guarding of those waiting to be executed. Pandurević expressed curiosity as to why Civil Defense wasn't doing the burials as initially planned. The commander then expressed disappointment that the column hadn't yet been cut off and destroyed. Obrenović repeated his suggestion to give the column an escape route, and his commander retorted "who has the right to barter using Serbian land?"

In the afternoon on the 15th, Obrenović met with Lazar Ristić at the 4th Battalion's forward command post in Baljkovice. He asked him why, if Ristić had been unable to provide reinforcements to him earlier, he was able to send men to Milorad Trbić to assist with guarding prisoners in Orahovica. Ristić claimed to have been unaware that executions were going to be taking place, and upon learning of this had tried to remove his men from the area when Drago Nikolić stopped them and promised them new uniforms if they would stay and continue to help kill the prisoners.

The word of the executions by this time was spreading everywhere. Obrenović was briefed that there was a group at Orahovac from the Drina Corps Military Police assisting with the executions. An elderly man attached to the Rear Services of 4th Battalion related to him that he had heard that Drago Nikolić had personally taken part in the execution and that he could not believe what had happened. That evening and all that night, the ARBiH 28th Division cut off the 4th Battalion's communications lines and transport routes and mounted another attack. Obrenović and his troops extracted from Baljkovice the next day, having lost 40 soldiers to the enemy. On 16 July, at 14:00, VRS troops opened an escape corridor and began sweeping operations to drive the 28th Division forces through it. The corridor was closed four hours later at 18:00 that same day.

On the afternoon of 16 July Obrenović was sent to the 6th Battalion Rear Services commander, Ostoja Stanišić. He was told by Stanišić that his deputy had been wounded and that Ljubiša Beara had brought prisoners to the nearby school in Petkovci. Stanišić was evidently angry as the last group of prisoners were not taken to the dam to be executed, but were cut down right there at the school and that his men had to clean up the mess at the school, including the removal of the bodies to the dam. Obrenović was briefed that, while the 10th Sabotage Detachment from Vlasenica took part in the executions, together with selected soldiers from Bratunac, the Zvornik Brigade's 6th Battalion trucks and personnel were utilised to transport the corpses from the school, which were buried in a mass grave at the dam.

On 17 July VRS personnel from the "R" Battalion of the Zvornik Brigade took most of approximately 1,200 prisoners from the school in Pilica and retrieved approximately 500 bodies of the victims from the Pilica Cultural Center and transported them to the Branjevo military farm, where the living prisoners were executed by the members of Bratunac Brigade and the 10th Sabotage Detachment, among them Dražen Erdemović, while the Engineering Company of the Zvornik Brigade buried the victims in a mass grave.

At noon on 18 July Obrenović was ordered by Pandurević to report to and brief three senior officers from the Drina Corps Main Staff regarding the corridor opening for the column. He met Colonel Sladojević; Colonel Trkulja, who was in charge of the armoured units at Main Staff; and military police chief Colonel Stanković after their meeting had already begun. After the description of the operation, Obrenović was grilled on the VRS capabilities and weaknesses. He later complained that they believed "we never put up resistance to the 28th Division and just let them through". The senior officers were surprised to hear of the stiff Serb losses in the region. Obrenović was dismissed from the meeting before it was finished.

The same day (18 July), a captured Bosnian soldier managed to kill a Serb soldier and wound a number of others before being killed. Drina Corps commanders then ordered that their units should no longer risk taking prisoners, and at that point VRS troops shot the surrendering Bosnians on sight more frequently and stopped bring captives in for processing. That same day, troops from the 16th Brigade of the 1st Krajina Corps, re-subordinated to the command of the Zvornik Brigade, captured ten stragglers from the column and summarily executed them on spot at a place near Nezuk. On 21 July the no-prisoners order was rescinded for the Zvornik Brigade by Pandurević, who ordered that all prisoners should be transported to facilities and processed according to normal procedures. On 22 July four men from the column were captured by Zvornik Brigade troops and turned over to the brigade's security personnel to be interrogated and then executed.

===== "Everything is going according to plan" =====
On 19 July the following conversation between Obrenović and Drina Corps commandant General Radislav Krstić was intercepted:

RK: Is that you, Obrenović?
DO: Yes.
RK: Krstić here.
DO: How are you General, sir?
RK: I'm great, and you?
DO: Thanks to you I am too.
RK: Way to go, Chief. And how's you're health?
DO: It's fine, thank God, it's fine.
RK: Are you working down there?
DO: Of course we're working.
RK: Good.
DO: We've managed to catch a few more, either by gunpoint or in mines.
RK: Kill them all. God damn it.
DO: Everything, everything is going according to plan. Yes.
RK: Not a single one must be left alive.
DO: Everything is going according to plan. Everything.
RK: Way to go, Chief. The Turks are probably listening to us. Let them listen, the motherfuckers.
DO: Yeah, let them.

===== Wounded prisoners at "Standard" =====
On 20 July Obrenović was ordered to inspect the clinic at "Standard" (converted Novi Standard shoe factory) in Karakaj, and brief the hospital staff regarding the prisoners being treated there on the orders of a colonel in the Medical Corps. He discovered that the Serb wounded were being housed in close proximity to the enemy wounded, and instructed the staff not to allow anyone into the room. He informed them that prisoners would be transported to Bijeljina as they recovered.

On 23 July, at 08:00, Pandurević called the Drina Corps to resolve the issue of prisoners at the clinic. Obrenović received word from the Drina Corps that Colonel Popović would be coming to deal with the prisoners which suggested that they would likely not live to see Bijeljina. Military policemen took the prisoners away early one morning and shot the prisoners dead at an established execution site. Obrenović was later told that Popović had passed an order from General Ratko Mladić to Drago Nikolić that these patients had to be executed and that Popović had acted as a courier.

===== After the massacre =====
Obrenović was the Chief Of Staff of the 1st Zvornik Infantry Brigade until 8 August, when he acted as Brigade commander in Pandurević's absence. During this time General Krstić visited Zvornik and requested that Obrenović take him to the soldiers in the field who had been involved in the most fierce fighting. Obrenović decided to take him to the men in the trenches of the right flank of the 7th Battalion. Next to a trench one of the soldiers was listening on a transistor radio to the broadcast account of a survivor from one of the executions. General Krstić ordered that the radio be switched off, ordering them to not listen to enemy radio. He asked Obrenović if he had issued orders that enemy radio should not be listened to and Obrenović said that he had not. Obrenović later asked Krstić why the killing of so many ordinary people took place, saying that even if they were all chickens that were killed, there still had to be a reason. Krstić asked Obrenović where he had been. When Obrenović answered that he'd been at the field at Snagovo as ordered, Krstić cut the conversation short.

Between August and November 1995, VRS soldiers took part in a large scale operation to cover up the murders and executions committed in the zone under the responsibility of the brigades from Zvornik and Bratunac. The bodies were exhumed from their graves at the army farm in Branjevo, and also from Kozluk, the headquarters of the "Drina Wolves" where approximately 500 prisoners were killed by them on 15 July, from the dam close to Petkovci, from Orahovac and from Glogova, to be transferred to secondary mass graves. Personnel and earth moving machinery from the Zvornik Brigade were used extensively throughout these operations.

Obrenović later testified that on 20 October he learned that several members of the brigade's engineering unit, military police and Drago Nikolić participated in the re-burial of those prisoners executed in July 1995. Popović brought in others to help, including units from the Drina Corps Military Police, who secured the area and traffic where the re-burials were taking place. Some Zvornik Brigade engineers were involved in the loading of bodies from the primary graves. Both Popović and Beara oversaw the re-burial operation, but were wearing civilian clothes.

== After the wars ==
On 30 April 1996 Obrenović was promoted to the post of commander of the 303rd Motorized Brigade. Four months later the 303rd was absorbed into the 505th, and he retained his post as commander. It was around this time that SFOR detected some explosives under unknown conditions (possible a cache of mines, which was common) which triggered a VRS internal investigation. During this investigation, Jokić accused Obrenović of working for SFOR. Obrenović requested relief from his commandant due to the ensuing friction. Jokić was subsequently transferred to the command of 5th Corps at Sokolac.

== Arrest, trial and release ==
On 16 March 2001 General Dragan Obrenović was indicted by the International Criminal Tribunal for the Former Yugoslavia in The Hague for complicity in genocide, extermination, persecution, and two counts of murder.

On 15 April 2001, at 14:30, three armed men and one woman abducted Obrenović in the town of Kozluk. He was bundled into a vehicle that quickly sped away from the scene before shocked witnesses. Town police units caught up with the vehicle in short order, only to learn that the abductors were SFOR personnel with UN investigators. Obrenovic was transferred that same day to the Hague, he entered not-guilty pleas across the board at his arraignment on the 18th. He initially pleaded not guilty.

On 20 May 2003 Obrenović entered a plea agreement with the ICTY prosecutor's office. He pleaded guilty to one count of persecution, and in exchange for truthful allocution to his role in the massacre and his testimony against his co-accused (his indictment was to be joined with that of four others on 27 May) he was promised a reduced sentence. On 10 December 2003 Obrenović was sentenced to 17 years in prison, with 969 days credit for time served.

In 2003, Obrenović said:

I find it very hard to say this truth. I am to blame for everything I did at that time. I am trying to erase all this and to be what I was not at that time. I am also to blame for what I did not do, for not trying to protect those prisoners. Regardless of the temporary nature of my then-post. I ask myself again and again, what could I have done that I didn't do? Thousands of innocent victims perished. Graves remain behind, refugees, destruction and misfortune and misery. I bear general part of the responsibility for this. There is misfortune on all sides that stays behind as a warning that this should never happen again. My testimony and admission of guilt will also remove blame from my nation because it is individual guilt, the guilt of a man named Dragan Obrenović. I stand by this. I am responsible for this. The guilt for which I feel remorse and for which I apologise to the victims and to their shadows. I will be happy if this contributed to reconciliation in Bosnia, if neighbours can again shake hands, if our children can again play games together, and if they have the right to a chance. I will be happy if my testimony helps the families of victims, if I can spare them having to testify again and thus relive the horrors and the pain during their testimony. It is my wish that my testimony should help prevent this ever happening again, not just in Bosnia, but anywhere in the world. It is too late for me now, but for the children living in Bosnia now, it's not too late and I hope that this will be a good warning to them.

On 7 May 2012 Aftenposten reported that Obrenović had at some point been released from jail, having served nine years. Obrenović served his time at Kongsvinger minimum-security jail Publicly redacted court orders explain why the early release order was issued.

== Personal life ==
Obrenović is married to an economist with whom he had a son in 1997.
