= Zvornik Brigade =

1st Zvornik Brigade
- Active: 1992-1996
- Country: Republika Srpska
- Allegiance: Army of Republika Srpska
- Branch: Ground Forces
- Type: Infantry
- Size: 5,500
- Garrison/HQ: Zvornik
- Engagements: Bosnian War: Kalesija and Kamenica offensive; Operation Cerska 93; Operation Drina; Operation Spreča 95; Operation Krivaja 95
- Decorations: Medal of Petar Mrkonjić

Commanders
- Notable commanders: Vidoje Blagojević; Vinko Pandurević

The 1st Zvornik Brigade (Serbian: 1. 3ворничка бригада; 1. zvornička brigada) was a brigade of the Bosnian Serb army based in Zvornik. The brigade was known and, except for Marko Milošević, tried for its human rights atrocities against Bosnian Muslims during the 1992-1995 Bosnian War. Notable members of the Zvornik Brigade included Milošević, Dragan Obrenović, Milorad Trbić, and Brigadier Vinko Pandurević.
