= Drago Nikolić =

Bosnian Serb war criminal

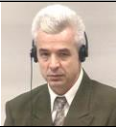
Drago Nikolić

Drago Nikolić (Serbian Cyrillic: Драго Николић; 9 November 1957 – 11 October 2015) was a Bosnian Serb who participated in the War in Bosnia and Herzegovina. He was the 2nd Lieutenant who served as Chief of Security for the Zvornik Brigade of the Bosnian Serb Army.

On 6 September 2002, the ICTY issued an indictment against him for his role in the Srebrenica Massacre. He surrendered and was transferred to The Hague on 17 March 2005. He appeared in the chamber and pleaded "not guilty". On 10 June 2010, the Trial Chamber brought a verdict: Nikolić, working closely with Ljubiša Beara and Vujadin Popović, was involved in organising the detention and execution of prisoners at Ročević School. He demonstrated a resolve to carry out his assigned tasks in this murderous operation. His contribution to the Joint Criminal Enterprise to murder was persistent and determined. He was convicted of aiding and abetting genocide, extermination, murder and persecutions and sentenced to 35 years in prison.

He was the security chief of the Zvornik Brigade.

== See also ==
- Bosnian Genocide
