= Vidoje Blagojević =

Bosnian Serb war criminal

- Born: 22 June 1950 (age 76); Bratunac, Bosnia and Herzegovina, Yugoslavia
- Status: Released
- Convictions: War crimes Crimes against humanity (3 counts)
- Penalty: 18 years imprisonment; commuted to 15 years imprisonment

Vidoje Blagojević (born 22 June 1950) is a former commander of the Bratunac Brigade of the Republika Srpska Army who was charged and tried by the ICTY for his involvement in the Srebrenica massacre.

== Career ==
A Bosnian Serb, during the course of the Bosnian War, Blagojević rose through the ranks of the Army of Republika Srpska. He participated in the securing and eventual capture of the Srebrenica safe area. He was captured on 10 August 2001 and soon interred at the Hague Tribunal. Blagojević was tried along with Dragan Jokić and Dragan Obrenović. Both pleaded not guilty.

In January 2005, the International Criminal Tribunal for the Former Yugoslavia found Blagojević guilty of engaging in genocide and other war crimes and sentenced him to 18 years in prison. On 9 May the ICTY's appeals court reversed the genocide conviction and reduced his sentence to 15 years. On 25 January 2008, he was transferred to Norway to serve his prison sentence. On 22 December 2012, he was granted early release.
