= Árpád Prandler =

Hungarian jurist (1930–2014)

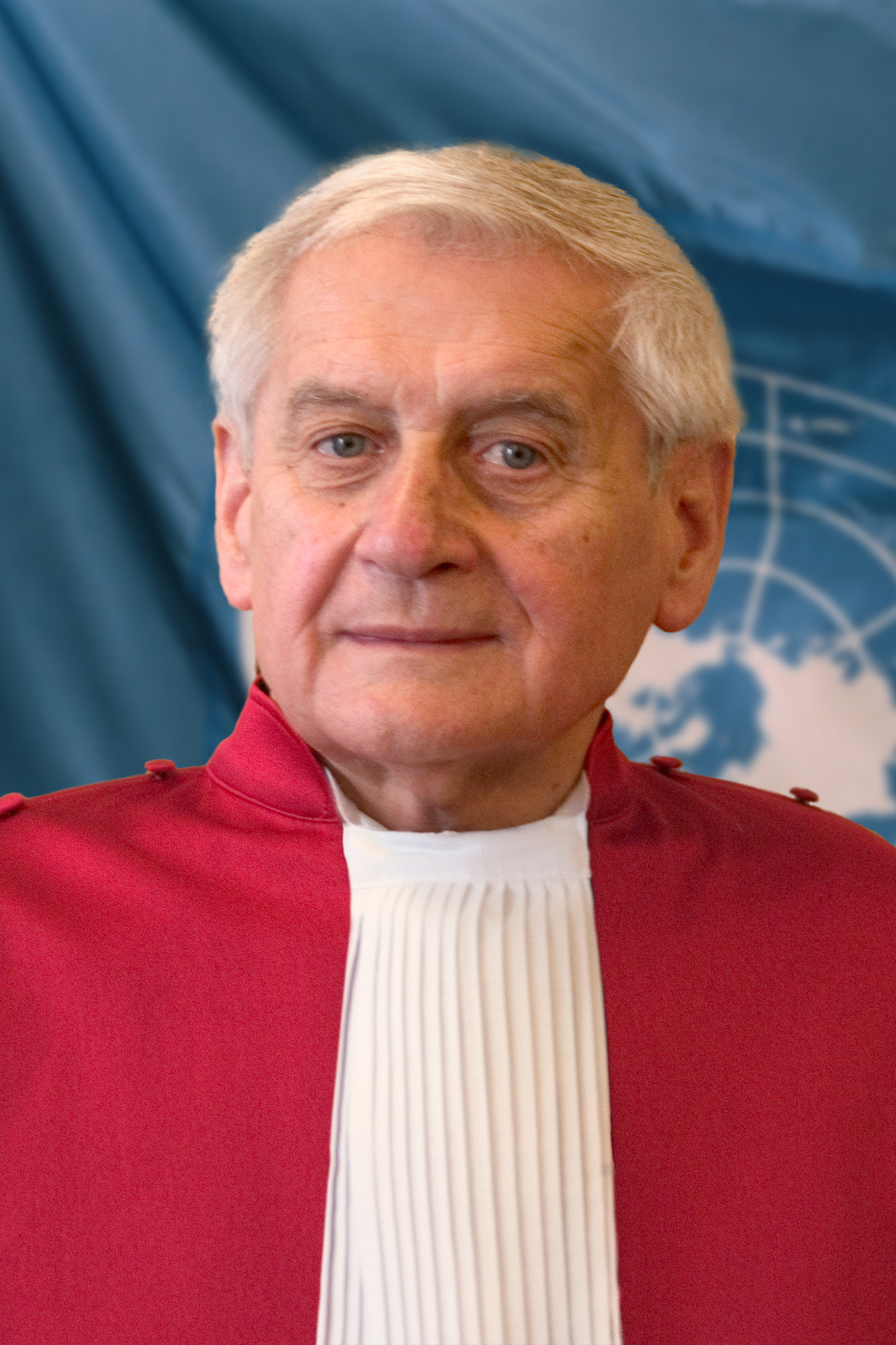

Ad Litem Judge of the International Criminal Tribunal for the former Yugoslavia
- In office 2006–2013

Personal details
- Born: 23 February 1930 Kaposvár, Hungary
- Died: 5 February 2014 (aged 83)
- Education: Eötvös Loránd University
- Website: www.icty.org

Árpád Prandler (23 February 1930 – 5 February 2014) was a Hungarian jurist who served as an ad litem judge of the International Criminal Tribunal for the former Yugoslavia based in The Hague, Netherlands between 2006 and 2013.

== Education ==
He received a Bachelor of Law from Eötvös Loránd University in Budapest in 1952, a B.A. in history in 1957 and PhD from the Hungarian Academy of Sciences in International Law in 1972. He was a senior lecturer at the Faculty of Law at Budapest University and Honorary Professor at the Department of International Relations until 2006.

== Career ==
From 1962 to 2014, he held various positions at the Hungarian Ministry of Foreign Affairs. From 1963 to 1968, he was Deputy Representative of the Permanent Mission of Hungary to the United Nations and from 1963 to 1970, a member of the Hungarian delegation to UN General Assembly.

From 1996 to 2014, he was a member of the International Humanitarian Fact-Finding Commission.

From 1992 to 1997, he was Senior Adviser at the Ministry of Foreign Affairs and from 1997 to 2000, Deputy Director of its International Law Department.

From 2006 to 2013, he was an Ad litem judge at the International Criminal Tribunal for the former Yugoslavia.

In addition, served as Chairman of the National Advisory Committee on International Humanitarian Law since 1999 and, since 2000, as Chairman of the Hungarian branch of International Law Association.

== Publications ==
He is the author of several articles on, among other things, the Charter of the United Nations, peacekeeping, Law of the Sea, disarmament, human rights, international humanitarian law, international criminal law, human rights law, and international organizations. Also published a University textbook on international organizations and institutions (its third edition was published in 2011) and written a monograph on the United Nations Security Council.

- Az ENSZ Biztonsági Tanácsa. Budapest: Közgazdasági és Jogi. 1974.
- Nemzetközi szervezetek és intézmények. ed. Prandler, Árpád. Budapest: Aula. 2001. ISBN 963-9345-44-X (co-author)
- Nemzetközi szervezetek és intézmények. ed. Prandler, Árpád. Second edition. Budapest: Aula. 2005. ISBN 963-9585-56-4 (co-author)
