= Dragan Nikolić (commander) =

Bosnian Serb army commander (1957–2018)

Dragan Nikolić (26 April 1957 – 4 June 2018) was a Bosnian Serb army commander of the Sušica detention camp near Vlasenica in eastern Bosnia and Herzegovina who was charged with war crimes. He was arrested in Bosnia and Herzegovina by the NATO-led Stabilization Force (SFOR) and taken to the Hague in Netherlands for trial.

Nikolić argued that the sovereignty of Bosnia and Herzegovina was violated when he was abducted by SFOR rather than being voluntarily extradited. He contended that as a result the International Criminal Tribunal for the Former Yugoslavia (ICTY) could not exercise jurisdiction over the case. The ICTY Appeals Chamber commented on the need to balance a legitimate expectation that someone accused of "universally condemned offences" be brought to justice "against the principle of State sovereignty and fundamental human rights of the accused".

The Appeals Chamber found "no basis upon which jurisdiction should not be exercised". Following the ICTY trial, he was sentenced to 23 years in prison on 18 December 2003. This was reduced to 20 years following a sentence appeal. 8,000 mainly Bosniak civilians were detained in the Sušica camp between May and October 1992.

Nikolić was serving his sentence at a prison in Italy until he was granted early release in 2013. He died in Serbia in June 2018, aged 61, and was buried at Vlasenica.
