= Sušica camp =

Serbian concentration camp

- Detention camp
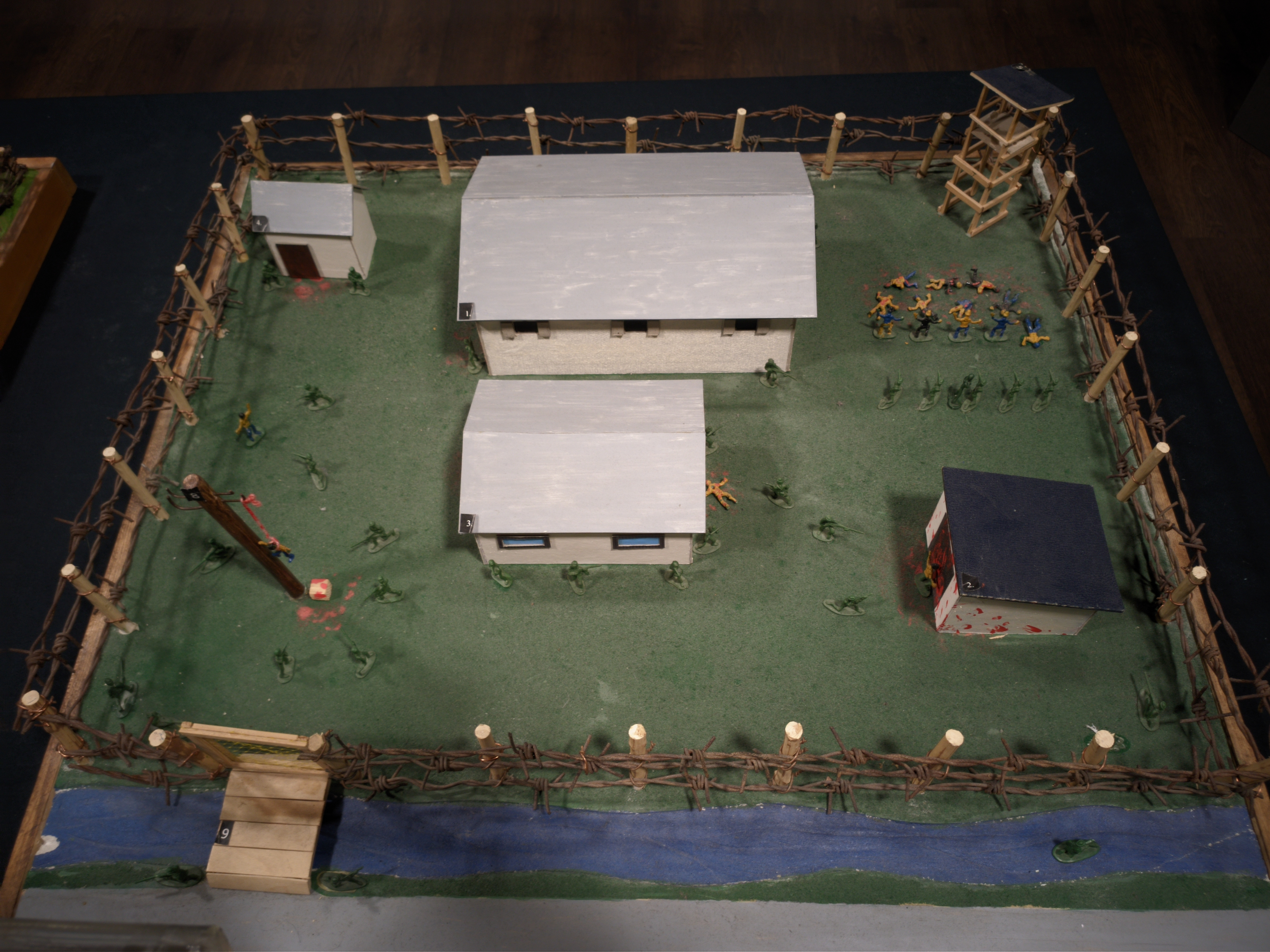
- Camp model exhibited in the Museum of Crimes against Humanity and Genocide.

- Location within Republika Srpska Location within Bosnia and Herzegovina
- Coordinates: 44°10′22″N 18°56′42″E
- Location: Vlasenica municipality, Republika Srpska, Bosnia and Herzegovina
- Operated by: Vlasenica Police Station as part of the RS Ministry of Interior and the VRS Military Police
- Operational: 31 May to October 1992
- Inmates: Bosniaks

The Sušica camp was a concentration and detention camp set up by Republika Srpska forces for Bosniaks and other non-Serbs in the Vlasenica municipality in eastern Bosnia and Herzegovina.

== The camp ==
The camp comprised two main buildings and a small house. The detainees were housed in a hangar which measured approximately 30 by 50 meters. Between late May and October 1992, as many as 8,000 Bosniak civilians and other non-Serbs from Vlasenica and the surrounding villages were successively detained in the hangar at Sušica camp. The number of detainees in the hangar at any one time was usually between 300 and 500. The building was severely overcrowded and living conditions were deplorable.

Men, women and children were detained at the camp, sometimes entire families. Women and children as young as eight years old were usually detained for short periods of time and then forcibly transferred to nearby Muslim areas. The men were held in the camp until its closure in late September 1992, and were then transferred to the larger Batković concentration camp near the town of Bijeljina. Women of all ages were raped or sexually assaulted during their time in the camp by camp guards or other men who were allowed to enter the camp.

Male detainees of the camp suffered a similar fate as the women. They were bullied, tortured and murdered. According to Pero Popović, a former guard at the camp, they were generally lined up against an electricity pylon just outside the barracks and shot. Detainees at Sušica performed forced labour, sometimes at the front lines. Some detainees were killed by camp guards or died from mistreatment. A massacre was committed during the night of 30 September 1992, when the remaining 140 to 150 detainees at Sušica camp were driven out of the camp with buses and executed.

== War crime verdict ==
Dragan Nikolić, the commander of the camp, pleaded guilty to crimes against humanity and was sentenced to 20 years imprisonment. Predrag Bastah and Goran Višković were sentenced to 22 years and 18 years of imprisonment, respectively, for their involvement at the Sušica camp.

== See also ==
- Bosnian Genocide
- Dretelj camp
- Gabela camp
- Heliodrom camp
- Keraterm camp
- Manjača camp
- Omarska camp
- Trnopolje camp
- Uzamnica camp
- Vilina Vlas
