= Milorad Trbić =

Bosnian Serb military officer (born 1958)

- Born: 22 February 1958 (age 68); Maglaj, PR Bosnia and Herzegovina, FNR Yugoslavia

Milorad Trbić (born 22 February 1958) is a Bosnian Serb who served as an Assistant Commander for Security with the Zvornik Brigade of the Army of Republika Srpska. He was indicted for genocide by the International Criminal Tribunal for the former Yugoslavia (ICTY), arrested, and transferred to Sarajevo to stand genocide trial in front of the Court of Bosnia and Herzegovina.

He was found guilty on one count of genocide and sentenced to 30 years in prison. On appeal, his sentence was reduced to 20 years.

== See also ==
- Bosnian Genocide
