= Ljubiša Beara =

Bosnian Serb war criminal (1939–2017)

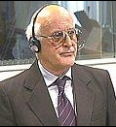
Ljubiša Beara

Ljubiša Beara (14 July 1939 – 8 February 2017) was a Bosnian Serb colonel and convicted war criminal who participated in the Srebrenica massacre.

== Biography ==
Born in Sarajevo, Drina Banovina, Kingdom of Yugoslavia, he was Colonel and Chief of Security of the Bosnian Serb Army Main Staff.

On 26 March 2002, the International Criminal Tribunal for the former Yugoslavia (ICTY) issued an indictment against him for his role in the Srebrenica Massacre. He surrendered and was transferred to The Hague on 10 October 2004. Two days later, he appeared in the Chamber and did not enter a plea. On 10 June 2010, the Trial Chamber brought a verdict that he "was the most senior officer of the Security Branch and had the clearest overall picture of the massive scale and scope of the killing operation. From his presence in Bratunac on the night of 13 July, to his personal visits to the various detention and execution sites and the significant logistical challenges he faced throughout, Beara had a very personal view of the staggering number of victims destined for execution. Steeped in this knowledge, he became, in the opinion of the Trial Chamber, a driving force behind the murder enterprise". The Chamber found that Beara was a member of the JCE to murder the Bosnian Muslim males from Srebrenica, and that he participated in that JCE with persecutory intent.

The Chamber was satisfied that in July 1995 Beara was intent on destroying a group by killing all the members of it within his reach, and that, beyond all reasonable doubt, he had harboured genocidal intent. He was convicted of genocide, extermination, murder and persecution and sentenced to life in prison. He died in Tegel Prison in Berlin on February 8, 2017, aged 77.

== See also ==
- Bosnian genocide
- Vujadin Popović
