= United Nations Security Council Resolution 1668 =

UN Security Council Resolution 1668
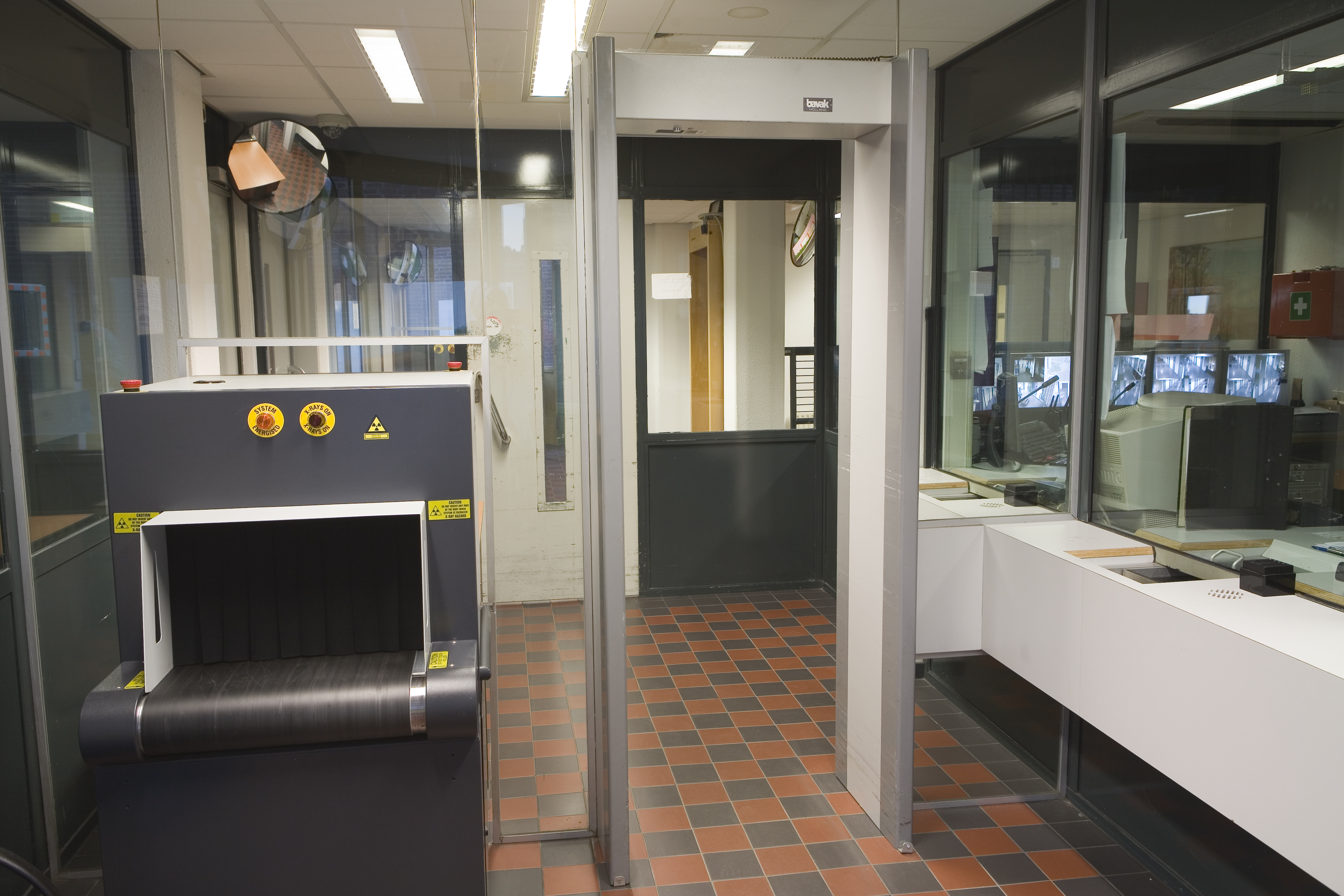
- Detention unit at the ICTY (Photograph provided courtesy of the ICTY)
- Date: 10 April 2006
- Meeting no.: 5,407
- Code: S/RES/1668 (Document)
- Subject: The International Criminal Tribunal for the former Yugoslavia
- Voting summary: 15 voted for; None voted against; None abstained
- Result: Adopted

Security Council composition
- Permanent members: China; France; Russia; United Kingdom; United States
- Non-permanent members: Argentina; Rep. of the Congo; Denmark; Ghana; Greece; Japan; Peru; Qatar; Slovakia; Tanzania

United Nations Security Council Resolution 1668, adopted unanimously on April 10, 2006, after recalling Resolution 1581 (2005), the Council extended the term of Judge Joaquín Canivell at the International Criminal Tribunal for the former Yugoslavia (ICTY) beyond his term of office to allow him to complete a case.

The Secretary-General Kofi Annan had requested the Council to extend Canivell's term so he could complete the Krajišnik case, notwithstanding the fact that his service at the ICTY had exceeded three years.

== See also ==
- List of United Nations Security Council Resolutions 1601 to 1700 (2005–2006)
- Yugoslav Wars
- List of United Nations Security Council Resolutions related to the conflicts in former Yugoslavia
