= Vinko Pandurević =

Serb military commander and genocide perpetrator (born 1959)

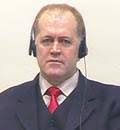
Vinko Pandurević

Vinko Pandurević (born 25 June 1959, Sokolac, Bosnia and Herzegovina) is a Serb former commanding officer of the Zvornik Brigade during the Bosnian War.

He was put on trial for war crimes at International Criminal Tribunal for the former Yugoslavia in the Hague.

Pandurević's defense lawyer argued he had "no effective control" of his brigade during the time when the atrocities occurred. However, on the basis of individual criminal responsibility (Article 7(1) of the Statute of the Tribunal), he was found guilty of aiding and abetting crimes against humanity and violations of the laws or customs of war. He was sentenced to 13 years' imprisonment, and granted early release on 9 April 2015.
