= United Nations Security Council Resolution 1837 =

UN Security Council Resolution 1837
- Date: 29 September 2008
- Meeting no.: 5,986
- Code: S/RES/1837 (Document)
- Subject: International Humanitarian Law Committed in the Territory of the Former Yugoslavia
- Voting summary: 15 voted for; None voted against; None abstained
- Result: Adopted

Security Council composition
- Permanent members: China; France; Russia; United Kingdom; United States
- Non-permanent members: Burkina Faso; Belgium; Costa Rica; Croatia; Indonesia; Italy; Libya; Panama; South Africa; Vietnam

United Nations Security Council Resolution 1837 was unanimously adopted on 29 September 2008.

== Resolution ==
The Security Council this morning extended the terms of office of 4 Appeals Chamber judges as well as those of 10 permanent and 27 ad litem judges of the International Criminal Tribunal for the Former Yugoslavia, until 31 December 2009 or the completion of cases to which they were assigned, if sooner.

Unanimously adopting resolution 1837 (2008) under Chapter VII of the United Nations Charter, the Council also amended article 12, paragraphs 1 and 2 of the Statute of the Tribunal regarding the composition of its Chambers.

== See also ==
- List of United Nations Security Council Resolutions 1801 to 1900 (2008–2009)
