= Vujadin Popović =

Bosnian Serb war criminal (born 1957)

Vujadin Popović Вујадин Поповић
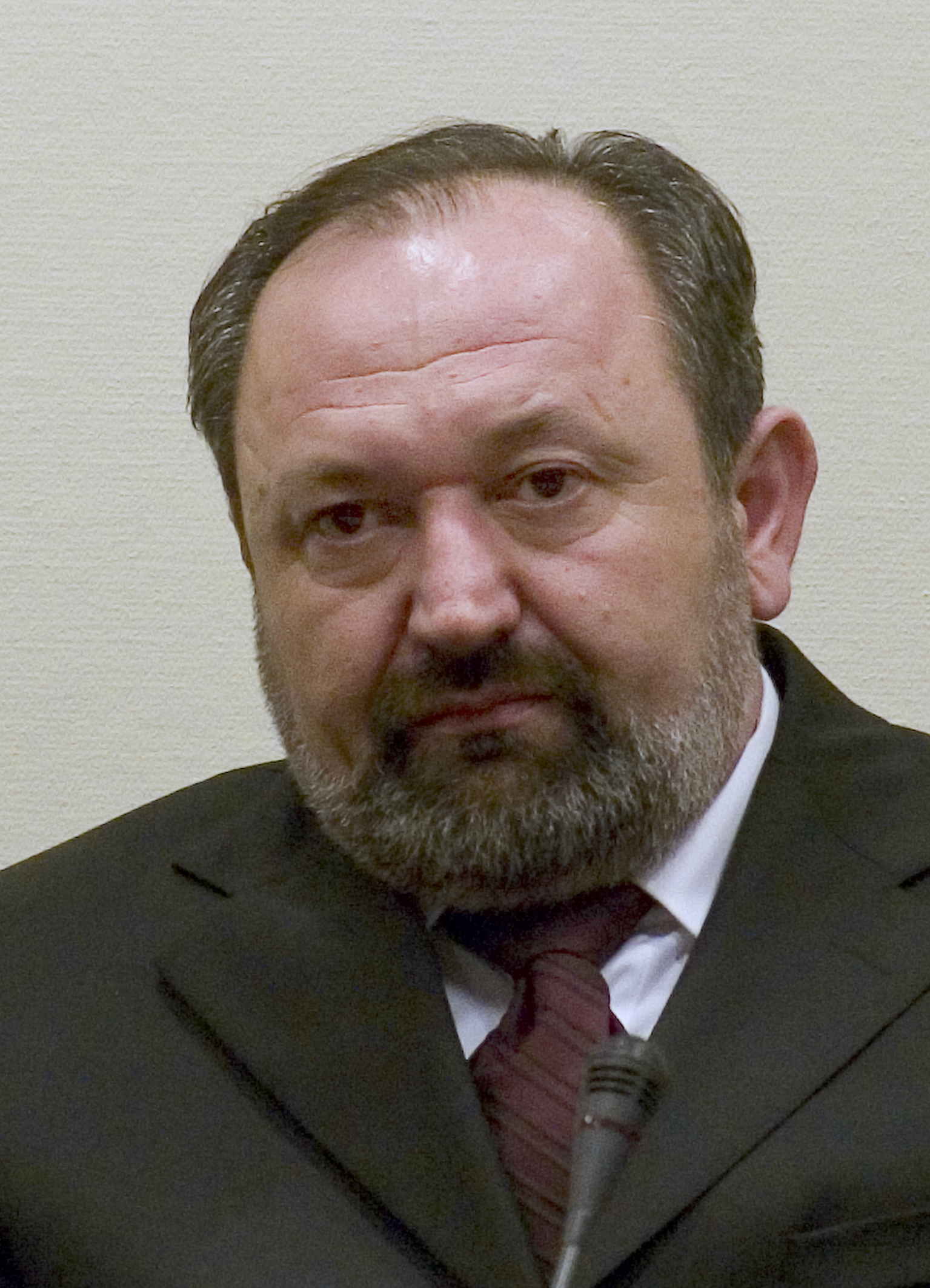
- Popović in 2005
- Born: 14 March 1957 (age 69); Popovići, SR Bosnia and Herzegovina, SFR Yugoslavia
- Organization: Army of Republika Srpska
- Status: Incarcerated
- Conviction: Genocide
- Penalty: Life imprisonment

Vujadin Popović (14 March 1957, Popovići, SR Bosnia and Herzegovina) is a Bosnian Serb war criminal, who participated in the War in Bosnia and Herzegovina and was convicted of genocide, extermination, murder and persecution and sentenced to life in prison. He was Lieutenant Colonel and the Chief of Security of the Drina Corps of the Army of Republika Srpska.

In 1995, he was present and on duty in the Drina Corps zone of responsibility, which included Srebrenica, Potocari, Bratunac and Zvornik. The International Criminal Tribunal for the former Yugoslavia indicted Vujadin Popović for genocide, conspiracy to commit genocide, extermination, murder, persecutions, forcible transfer, and deportation. These crimes allegedly took place between July and November 1995.

On 26 March 2002, the ICTY issued an indictment against him for his role in the Srebrenica Massacre. After a while he decided to surrender and he was transferred to The Hague on 14 April 2005. Four days later, he appeared in the chamber and pleaded "not guilty". On 10 June 2010, the Trial Chamber brought a verdict that he was present with the Bosnian Serb forces in Potočari on 12 July and was aware of the large number of men among the thousands of Bosnian Muslims gathered at Potočari on that day. The Trial Chamber was satisfied beyond reasonable doubt that Popović was fully engaged in the organisation of the killing operation being carried out in the Zvornik area. The Trial Chamber found that Popović was a member of the Joint criminal enterprise (JCE) to murder the Bosnian Muslim males of Srebrenica, and that he participated in that JCE with persecutory intent. He was convicted of genocide, extermination, murder and persecution and sentenced to life in prison.

On 8 September 2010 the defence and the prosecution filed their notices of appeal. The Appeals Chamber granted the defence request to vary the order of arguments in the appeal brief. On 30 January 2015 he was sentenced to life imprisonment. In 2020, his request for early release was denied.

== See also ==
- Bosnian genocide
