= United Nations Security Council Resolution 1849 =

UN Security Council Resolution 1849
- Date: 12 December 2008
- Meeting no.: 6,040
- Code: S/RES/1849 (Document)
- Subject: International Criminal Tribunal for the former Yugoslavia
- Voting summary: 15 voted for; None voted against; None abstained
- Result: Adopted

Security Council composition
- Permanent members: China; France; Russia; United Kingdom; United States
- Non-permanent members: Burkina Faso; Belgium; Costa Rica; Croatia; Indonesia; Italy; Libya; Panama; South Africa; Vietnam

United Nations Security Council Resolution 1849 was unanimously adopted on 12 December 2008.

== Resolution ==
To enable the International Criminal Tribunal for the Former Yugoslavia to meet its completion strategy, the Security Council this morning authorized the Secretary-General to appoint, as a temporary measure and within existing resources, additional ad litem judges to the Tribunal, in order to complete existing trials or conduct additional ones.

By resolution 1849 (2008), which was unanimously adopted today, the total number of ad litem judges will, from time to time, temporarily exceed the maximum of 12 provided for in the Tribunal’s Statute, to a maximum of 16 at any one time, returning to a maximum of 12 by 28 February 2009.

With 14 ad litem judges currently assigned to cases at the Tribunal, three of them assigned to a case that is expected to conclude by 12 February 2009, the Tribunal is expected to appoint a further ad litem judge to a case scheduled to commence on 15 December 2008. That would take the total number of ad litem judges to 15 until 12 February 2009.

== See also ==
- List of United Nations Security Council Resolutions 1801 to 1900 (2008–2009)
