= United Nations Security Council Resolution 1877 =

UN Security Council Resolution 1877
- Date: 7 July 2009
- Meeting no.: 6,155
- Code: S/RES/1877 (Document)
- Subject: International Humanitarian Law Committed in the Territory of the Former Yugoslavia
- Voting summary: 15 voted for; None voted against; None abstained
- Result: Adopted

Security Council composition
- Permanent members: China; France; Russia; United Kingdom; United States
- Non-permanent members: Austria; Burkina Faso; Costa Rica; Croatia; Japan; Libya; Mexico; Turkey; Uganda; Vietnam

United Nations Security Council Resolution 1877 was unanimously adopted on 7 July 2009.

== Resolution ==
Urging the International Tribunal for the Former Yugoslavia to take all possible measures to complete its work expeditiously, the Security Council today extended the term of office of 11 permanent judges until 31 December 2010, or until the completion of the cases to which they were or will be assigned if sooner.

Unanimously adopting resolution 1877 (2009), submitted by Austria, under Chapter VII of the United Nations Charter, the council also extended until the same date the term of office of 19 ad litem judges.

The Council further decided that upon the request of the Tribunal's President, the United Nations Secretary-General might appoint additional ad litem judges in order to complete existing trials or conduct additional trials.

Expressing its expectation that the extension of the term of office of judges would contribute towards the implementation of the Tribunal's completion strategy, the Council decided to review by 31 December 2009 the extension of the term of office of the permanent judges who were members of the Appeals Chamber.

The International Criminal Tribunal for the Former Yugoslavia (ICTY), established in 1993, is a United Nations court of law dealing with war crimes that took place during the conflicts in the Balkans in the 1990s.

On 4 June, the Council heard several briefings by officials of the Tribunal, including Judge Patrick Robinson, the Tribunal's President, Serge Brammertz, Chief Prosecutor, and Thomas Mayr-Harting of Austria, Chairman of the council's informal working group on that court and the International Criminal Tribunal for Rwanda.

== See also ==
- List of United Nations Security Council Resolutions 1801 to 1900 (2008–2009)
