= United Nations Security Council Resolution 1800 =

UN Security Council Resolution 1800
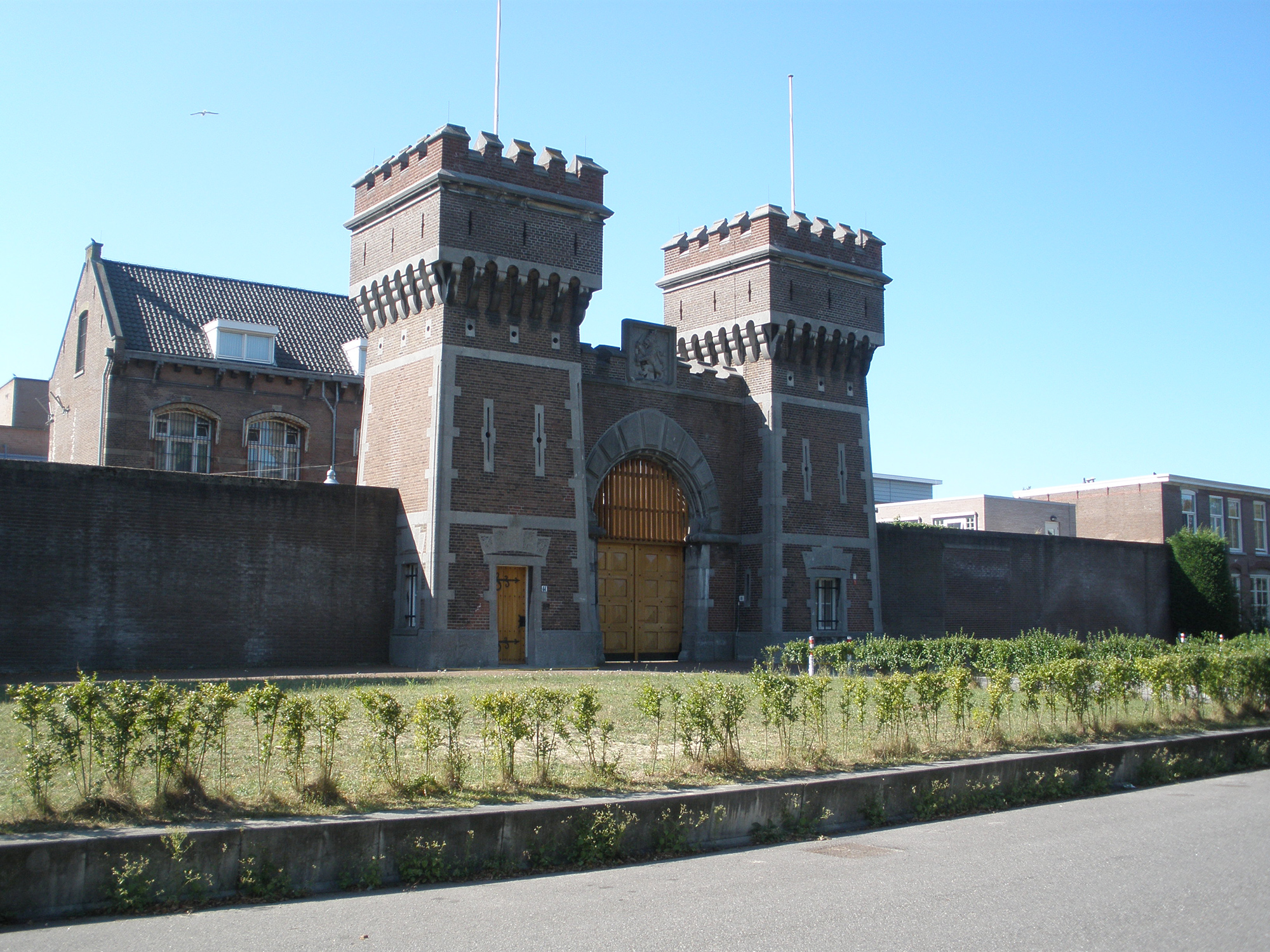
- Scheveningen prison, where people on trial by the International Criminal Tribunal for the Former Yugoslavia are detained.
- Date: 20 February 2008
- Meeting no.: 5,841
- Code: S/RES/1800 (Document)
- Subject: International Humanitarian Law Committed in the Territory of the Former Yugoslavia
- Voting summary: 15 voted for; None voted against; None abstained
- Result: Adopted

Security Council composition
- Permanent members: China; France; Russia; United Kingdom; United States
- Non-permanent members: Burkina Faso; Belgium; Costa Rica; Croatia; Indonesia; Italy; Libya; Panama; South Africa; Vietnam

United Nations Security Council Resolution 1800 was unanimously adopted on 20 February 2008.

== Resolution ==
In order to enable the International Criminal Tribunal for the Former Yugoslavia to conduct additional trials as soon as possible and meet its completion strategy, the Security Council today gave the green light for the appointment of more ad litem judges than the 12 provided for in the court’s statute.

Unanimously adopting resolution 1800 (2008) and acting under Chapter VII of the United nations Charter, the Council decided that the Secretary-General may appoint, within existing resources, additional ad litem judges to the Tribunal, notwithstanding the fact that the total number of ad litem judges appointed to the Chambers would, from time to time, temporarily exceed the maximum of 12 provided for in the Tribunal’s statute. The total number should not exceed 16 at any one time, returning to a maximum of 12 by 31 December 2008.

== See also ==
- List of United Nations Security Council Resolutions 1701 to 1800 (2006–2008)
