= United Nations Security Council Resolution 1629 =

UN Security Council Resolution 1629
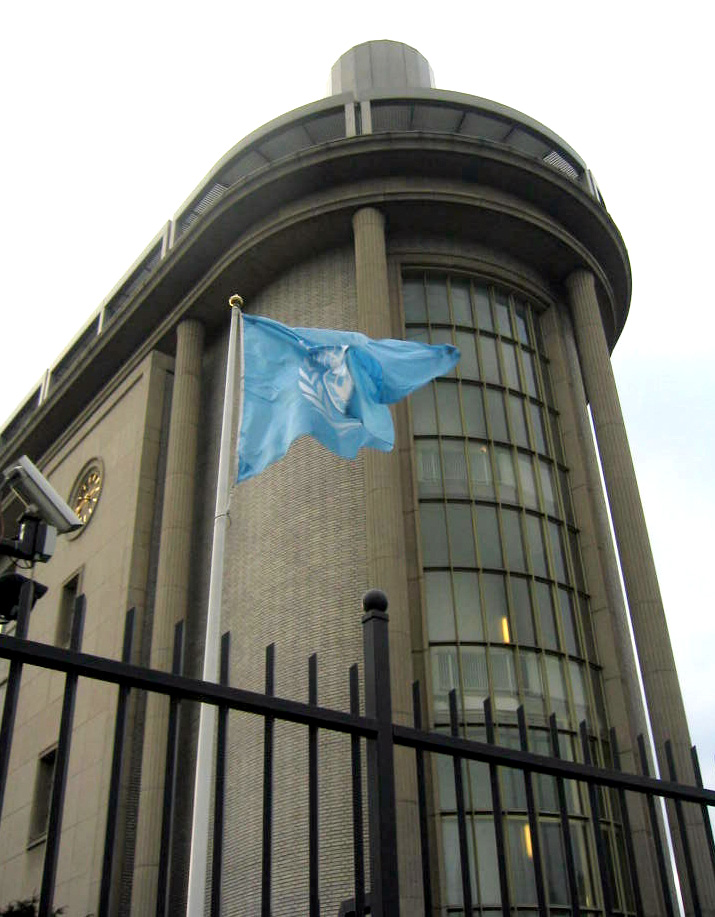
- ICTY building
- Date: 30 September 2005
- Meeting no.: 5,273
- Code: S/RES/1629 (Document)
- Subject: The International Criminal Tribunal for the former Yugoslavia
- Voting summary: 15 voted for; None voted against; None abstained
- Result: Adopted

Security Council composition
- Permanent members: China; France; Russia; United Kingdom; United States
- Non-permanent members: Algeria; Argentina; Benin; Brazil; Denmark; Greece; Japan; Philippines; Romania; Tanzania

United Nations Security Council resolution 1629, adopted unanimously on 30 September 2005, after considering the Statute of the International Criminal Tribunal for the former Yugoslavia (ICTY), the Council decided that Judge Christine Van Den Wyngaert could participate in the Mile Mrkšić case, before her elected term as permanent judge of the Tribunal had begun.

Wyngaert's term was due to begin on 17 November 2005, and the Mrkšić case was to commence on 3 October 2005.

== See also ==
- List of United Nations Security Council Resolutions 1601 to 1700 (2005–2006)
- Yugoslav Wars
- List of United Nations Security Council Resolutions related to the conflicts in former Yugoslavia
