= United Nations Security Council Resolution 1581 =

UN Security Council Resolution 1581
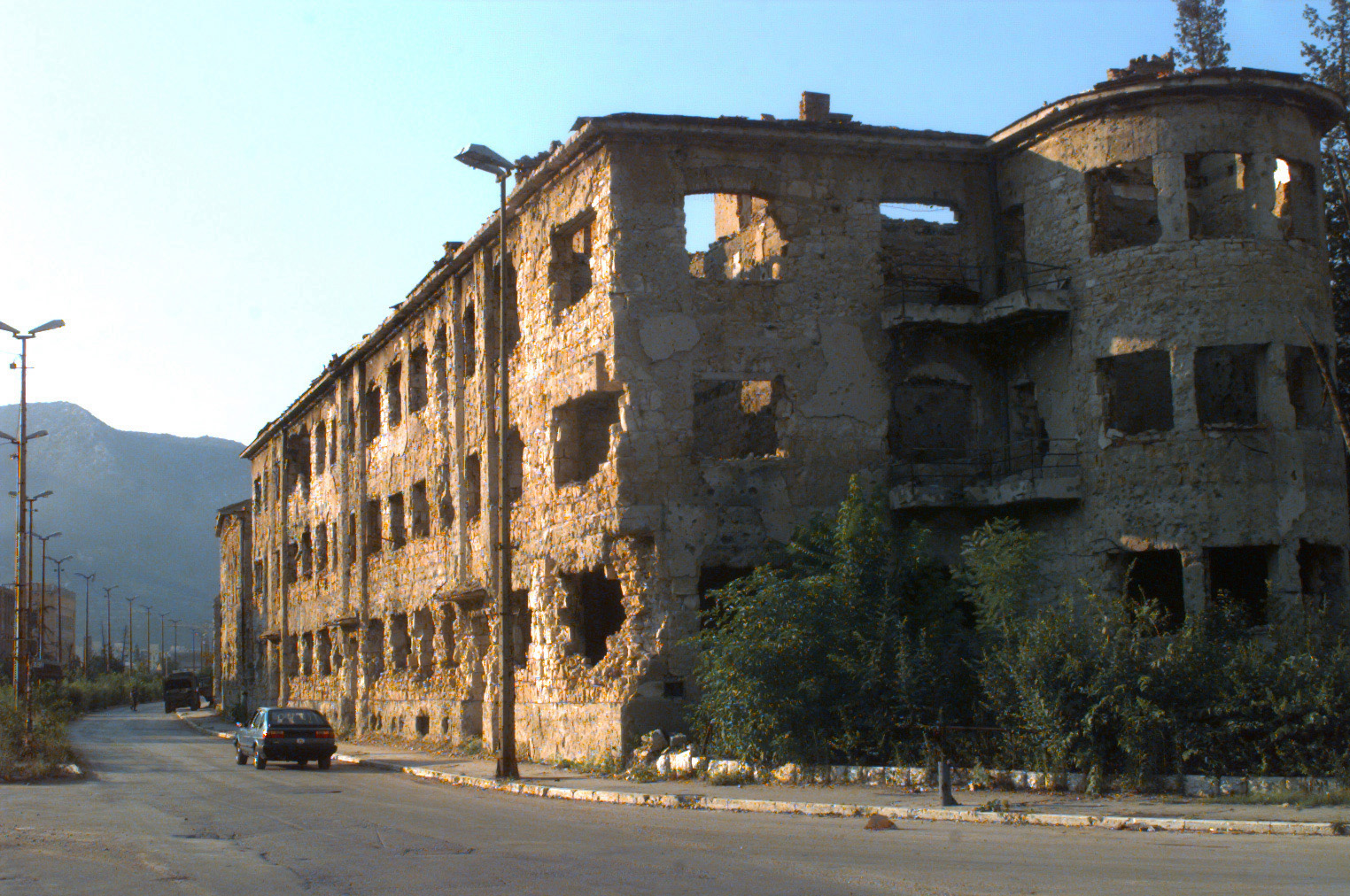
- Damaged buildings from the war
- Date: 18 January 2005
- Meeting no.: 5,112
- Code: S/RES/1581 (Document)
- Subject: The International Criminal Tribunal for the former Yugoslavia
- Voting summary: 15 voted for; None voted against; None abstained
- Result: Adopted

Security Council composition
- Permanent members: China; France; Russia; United Kingdom; United States
- Non-permanent members: Algeria; Argentina; Benin; Brazil; Denmark; Greece; Japan; Philippines; Romania; Tanzania

United Nations Security Council resolution 1581, adopted unanimously on 18 January 2005, after recalling resolutions 1503 (2003) and 1534 (2004), the Council approved the extension of the terms of office of seven short-term judges at the International Criminal Tribunal for the former Yugoslavia (ICTY) in order to allow them to finish adjudicating the cases on which they had been working. It was the first Security Council resolution adopted in 2005.

The Security Council expected that extending the trial terms of judges would enhance proceedings and allow the ICTY to fulfil its commitments to the completion strategy. Acting on a request by the Secretary-General Kofi Annan, the Council extends the terms of ad litem judges as follows:

(a) Judge Rasoazanany and Judge Swart finish the Hadžihasanović case;
(b) Judge Brydensholt and Judge Eser finish the Orić case;
(c) Judge Thelin and Judge Van Den Wyngaert finish the Limaj case;
(d) Judge Canivell finish the Krajišnik case;
(e) Judge Szénási finish the Halilović case if he was assigned to it;
(f) Judge Hanoteau finish the Krajišnik case if he was assigned to it.

The Council noted the intention of the ICTY to finish the Hadžihasanović case by the end of September 2005, the Halilović case before the end of October 2005, the Orić and Limaj cases by the end of November 2005 and the Krajišnik case before the end of April 2006.

== See also ==
- List of United Nations Security Council Resolutions 1501 to 1600 (2003–2005)
- Yugoslav Wars
- List of United Nations Security Council Resolutions related to the conflicts in former Yugoslavia
