= United Nations Security Council Resolution 2002 =

UN Security Council Resolution 2002
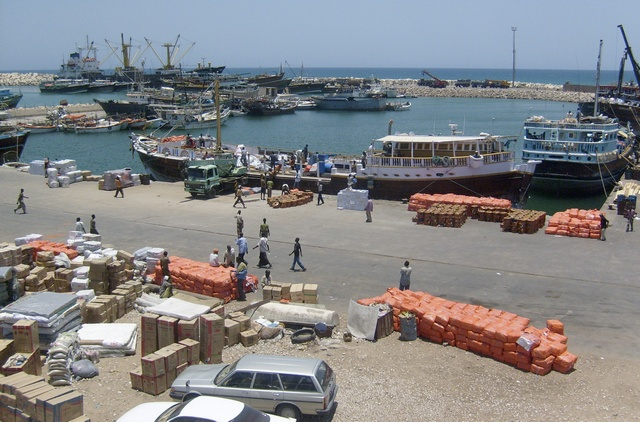
- Port of Bosaso in northern Somalia
- Date: 29 July 2011
- Meeting no.: 6,596
- Code: S/RES/2002 (Document)
- Subject: The situation in Somalia
- Voting summary: 15 voted for; None voted against; None abstained
- Result: Adopted

Security Council composition
- Permanent members: China; France; Russia; United Kingdom; United States
- Non-permanent members: Bosnia–Herzegovina; Brazil; Colombia; Germany; Gabon; India; Lebanon; Nigeria; Portugal; South Africa

United Nations Security Council Resolution 2002, adopted unanimously on July 29, 2011, after recalling resolutions 733 (1992), 1519 (2003), 1558 (2004), 1587 (2004), 1630 (2005), 1676 (2006), 1724 (2006), 1744 (2007), 1766 (2007), 1772 (2007), 1801 (2008), 1811 (2008), 1844 (2008), 1853 (2008), 1862 (2009), 1907 (2009), 1916 (2010) and 1972 (2011), the Council tightened sanctions against Eritrea and Somalia to include individuals and entities recruiting or using child soldiers in the Somali Civil War, in addition to those responsible for attacks against schools and hospitals in Somalia.

== Observations ==
In the preamble of the resolution, the Council reaffirmed the importance of the Djibouti Peace Agreement and the Transitional Federal Charter as a basis for a resolution of the conflict in Somalia. It condemned violations of the arms embargoes against Eritrea and Somalia and called upon all states, particularly those in the region, to refrain from violating the embargoes. Council members stressed the need for enhancing the monitoring of the arms embargoes and expressed concern at acts of intimidation against the monitoring group.

Resolution 2002 expressed concern over the worsening humanitarian situation in Somalia and condemned restrictions imposed by armed groups on the delivery of humanitarian aid to the country and attacks on humanitarian personnel. Meanwhile, the Council emphasised the importance of accountable and transparent allocation of financial resources and called for an end to the misappropriation of funds.

The Council determined that the situation in Somalia, Eritrea's actions "undermining peace and reconciliation" in Somalia, as well as the dispute between Eritrea and Djibouti, continued to constitute a threat to international peace and security.

== Acts ==
Acting under Chapter VII of the United Nations Charter, the Security Council decided that the travel bans, economic sanctions and arms embargo would also apply to individuals and entities designated by the Committee that either obstructing the peace process, recruiting child soldiers or attacking schools and hospitals in violation of international law. The acts would also include the misappropriation of financial funds.

The resolution considered that all non-local trade that went through by al Shabaab-controlled ports was a threat to peace, stability and security of Somalia and those who participated in this trade were subject to sanctions. In this regard, the Transitional Federal Government was asked to ban all trade by large vessels with ports controlled by the rebel group.

Resolution 2002 called for the unimpeded delivery of humanitarian assistance to all persons in need across Somalia. The Council requested the Secretary-General Ban Ki-moon to renew the mandate of the eight-person monitoring group established in Resolution 1558 (2004) for a further twelve months; among its priorities were to oversee the sanctions, investigate violations of the measures, investigate earnings at al Shabaab-controlled ports, and to make reports on the situation to the Council.

Finally, all international organisations and states in the region, including Eritrea and the Somali transitional government, were urged to ensure the safety of the monitoring group.

== See also ==
- 2011 Horn of Africa famine
- List of United Nations Security Council Resolutions 2001 to 2100 (2011 – present)
- Somali Civil War
- Somali Civil War (2009–present)
