= United Nations Security Council Resolution 1916 =

UN Security Council Resolution 1916
- Djibouti (blue), Eritrea (orange) and Somalia (green)
- Date: 19 March 2010
- Meeting no.: 6,289
- Code: S/RES/1916 (Document)
- Subject: Djibouti–Eritrea–Somalia
- Voting summary: 15 voted for; None voted against; None abstained
- Result: Adopted

Security Council composition
- Permanent members: China; France; Russia; United Kingdom; United States
- Non-permanent members: Austria; Bosnia–Herzegovina; Brazil; Gabon; Japan; Lebanon; Mexico; Nigeria; Turkey; Uganda

United Nations Security Council Resolution 1916, adopted unanimously on March 19, 2010, after recalling resolutions 733 (1992), 1519 (2003), 1558 (2004), 1587 (2004), 1630 (2005), 1676 (2006), 1724 (2006), 1744 (2007), 1766 (2007), 1772 (2007), 1801 (2008), 1811 (2008), 1844 (2008), 1853 (2008), 1862 (2009), 1894 (2009) and 1907 (2009), the Council extended the term of the Monitoring Group for 12 months and expanded its mandate to include the monitoring of the arms embargo on Eritrea in addition to Somalia.

== Observations ==
The Council recalled that the arms embargo on Somalia does not apply to weapons or military equipment destined for the African Union Mission in Somalia (AMISOM) or for assistance provided to develop security sector institutions in the absence of a negative decision by the Committee established in Resolution 751 (1992). The sovereignty and territorial integrity of Djibouti, Eritirea and Somalia was reaffirmed, as was the Djibouti Peace Agreement as a basis for a solution to the conflict. Concern was expressed at acts of intimidation against the Monitoring Group in interference in its work, and flows of weapons and ammunition supplies to and through Somalia and Eritrea in violations of the arms embargoes imposed in resolutions 733 and 1907 respectively were condemned as potential threats to international peace and security. All Member States were urged to refrain from any action in violation of the resolutions and that violators would be held accountable. The Council determined that the situation in Somalia, Eritrea's actions undermining peace and reconciliation in Somalia, as well as the dispute between Djibouti and Eritrea, continue to constitute a threat to international peace and security in the region.

== Acts ==
Acting under Chapter VII of the United Nations Charter, the Council stressed that all countries should comply with the provisions of the arms embargoes against Eritrea and Somalia, reiterating its intention to consider further measures to improve the implementation and ensure compliance with the provisions. The importance of humanitarian aid operations was underscored, while the politicisation, misuse, and misappropriation of humanitarian assistance by armed groups was condemned, requesting states and United Nations agencies to put an end to such practices.

The Council then decided to ease some restrictions and obligations under the international sanctions regime to enable the delivery of supplies and technical assistance by international, regional and subregional organisations and to ensure the delivery of urgently needed humanitarian assistance, reviewing the effects of the provision every 120 days. In this regard, the United Nations Humanitarian Aid Coordinator for Somalia was requested to report every 120 days on the implementation of this provision. The mandate of the Monitoring Group was then expanded as follows:

(a) to continue tasks set out in previous resolutions;
(b) to investigate activities that provided revenues used to violate the arms embargoes against Eritrea and Somalia;
(c) to investigate the use of transport, routes, seaports, airports and other facilities in connection with violations of the arms embargoes;
(d) to continue collecting information relating to individuals and entities engaged in the above acts and present to the Committee for further possible measures by the Council;
(e) to make recommendations based on its investigations;
(f) to co-operate closely with the Committee on specific recommendations for additional measures to ensure compliance with the arms embargoes;
(g) to identify areas where the capacities of states in the region could be strengthened to improve facilitation of the implementation of the arms embargoes;
(h) to provide a midterm briefing to the Council via the Committee and report monthly on progress;
(i) to submit a final report 15 days before the termination of the mandate of the Monitoring Group.

Meanwhile, the Secretary-General Ban Ki-moon was requested to secure financial arrangements to support the Monitoring Group. The Committee was required to make recommendations based on the reports of the Monitoring Group to ensure improved compliance with the arms embargoes and resolutions imposed by the Security Council on Somalia and Eritrea. All states in the region, including Eritrea and the Transitional Federal Government in Somalia were urged to co-operate with the Monitoring Group, allowing unimpeded access in order to complete its mandate.

== See also ==
- List of United Nations Security Council Resolutions 1901 to 2000 (2009–2011)
- Somali Civil War
- Somali Civil War (2009–present)
