= United Nations Security Council Resolution 1863 =

UN Security Council Resolution 1863
- Map location of Somalia
- Date: 16 January 2009
- Meeting no.: 6,068
- Code: S/2009/1863 (Document)
- Subject: The situation in Somalia
- Voting summary: 15 voted for; None voted against; None abstained
- Result: Adopted

Security Council composition
- Permanent members: China; France; Russia; United Kingdom; United States
- Non-permanent members: Austria; Burkina Faso; Costa Rica; Croatia; Japan; Libya; Mexico; Turkey; Uganda; Vietnam

United Nations Security Council Resolution 1863, adopted unanimously on January 16, 2009, after recalling resolutions 733 (1992), 751 (1992), 1356 (2001), 1425 (2002), 1519 (2003), 1725 (2006), 1744 (2007), 1772 (2007), 1801 (2008), 1811 (2008), 1814 (2008), 1831 (2008) and 1844 (2008) on the situation in Somalia, the Council its intention to establish a peace-keeping force in war-torn Somalia and called on Secretary-General Ban Ki-moon to develop, by April 15, 2009, a mandate for the proposed mission, which would replace the existing African Union force in the country (AMISOM).

== Resolution ==
=== United Nations Peace Keeping force to Somalia ===
The resolution stated that the Security Council would further review the actual deployment of peace keeping force to Somalia on June 1, 2009. In the meantime, the Secretary General would compile a report that would include developments in Somalia, progress towards full deployment of the existing 3,200-strong African Union force in Somalia and progress in the political process and security conditions on the ground. The Council called on the Secretary-General to also include in his report a mandate for the force, whose tasks would be to assist the delivery of Humanitarian aid to Somali civilians, protect government officials and buildings and as well as United Nations staff, to monitor the implementation of the Djibouti Peace Agreement and any subsequent cease fires and to build up Somalia's security forces.

=== Support of AMISOM ===
Welcoming AMISOM's contribution to lasting peace and stability in Somalia, the Security Council, acting under Chapter VII of the United Nations Charter, renewed the African Union's mission in Somalia for another six months and authorized AMISOM to take all necessary measures to protect key infrastructure in Somalia, as well as to create the appropriate security conditions for the delivery of humanitarian aid. It also requested that the African Union maintain AMISOM's deployment and reinforce the original 8,000-troop deployment in order to enhance the mission's capability to carry out its mandate and to protect key installations around the capital, Mogadishu.

The Security Council also called on the Secretary-General to establish a Trust Fund for African Union forces in the country until United Nations peace-keeping troops could arrive to assist in training Somali security forces. The council also asked the Secretary-General to hold a donors' conference as soon as possible to gather contributions to the trust fund and also called on the African Union to consult with the Secretary-General and submit budgetary requests to the fund. In response to a recommendation from the Secretary General, the Council approved the enhancement of AMISOM by transferring assets after the liquidation of the United Nations Mission in Ethiopia and Eritrea (UNMEE).

In order for AMISOM's forces to be incorporated into the proposed United Nations peacekeeping operation, the Security Council requested the Secretary-General provide a United Nations logistical support package to AMISOM, including equipment and services, until June 1, 2009, or until the Council reached a decision on establishing a United Nations force.

== Response ==
=== Statements by Security Council members ===
State	Notes
Burkina Faso	Paul Tiendrebego, the Burkina Faso representative to the United Nations, said that for some time the council has been faced with a dilemma in how to act effectively in chaotic situations, but believe they were laying an important milestone on the road to peace. He expressed sorrow at the fact the Resolution did not give a firmer commitment for its stated intentions, but still supported the process because it took into account the African Union's recemmemdations for strengthening AMISOM. He hoped the council could quickly reach a decision to establish a United Nations mission and called on donors to contribute to the trust fund.
France	Jean-Maurice Ripert, French Ambassador to the United Nations and current president of the Security Council, said France supported the Resolution and welcomed the unanimous adoption of it, and thanked the US ambassador for his involvement in moving it forward. "Failure to act was not an option in Somalia. To establish a peacekeeping operation now, when the situation was not right, however, would have sent the Blue Helmets to failure and would have created false hope among the population. The approach of the resolution sent a strong political signal to Somalia, namely that the Council was ready to create a peacekeeping mission once necessary conditions had been met." He also noted after the resignation of Somali President Aden Mohammed Nour and withdrawal of Ethiopian forces it was crucial that Somali parties implement the Djibouti Agreement and start work on improving security. "The resolution provided for support to AMISOM and supported the Joint Security Force. It called for establishment of a trust fund and a logistic support package for AMISOM. All that should be done quickly and with transparency."

== See also ==
- List of United Nations Security Council Resolutions 1801 to 1900 (2008–2009)
- Somali Civil War
