= United Nations Security Council Resolution 1676 =

UN Security Council Resolution 1676
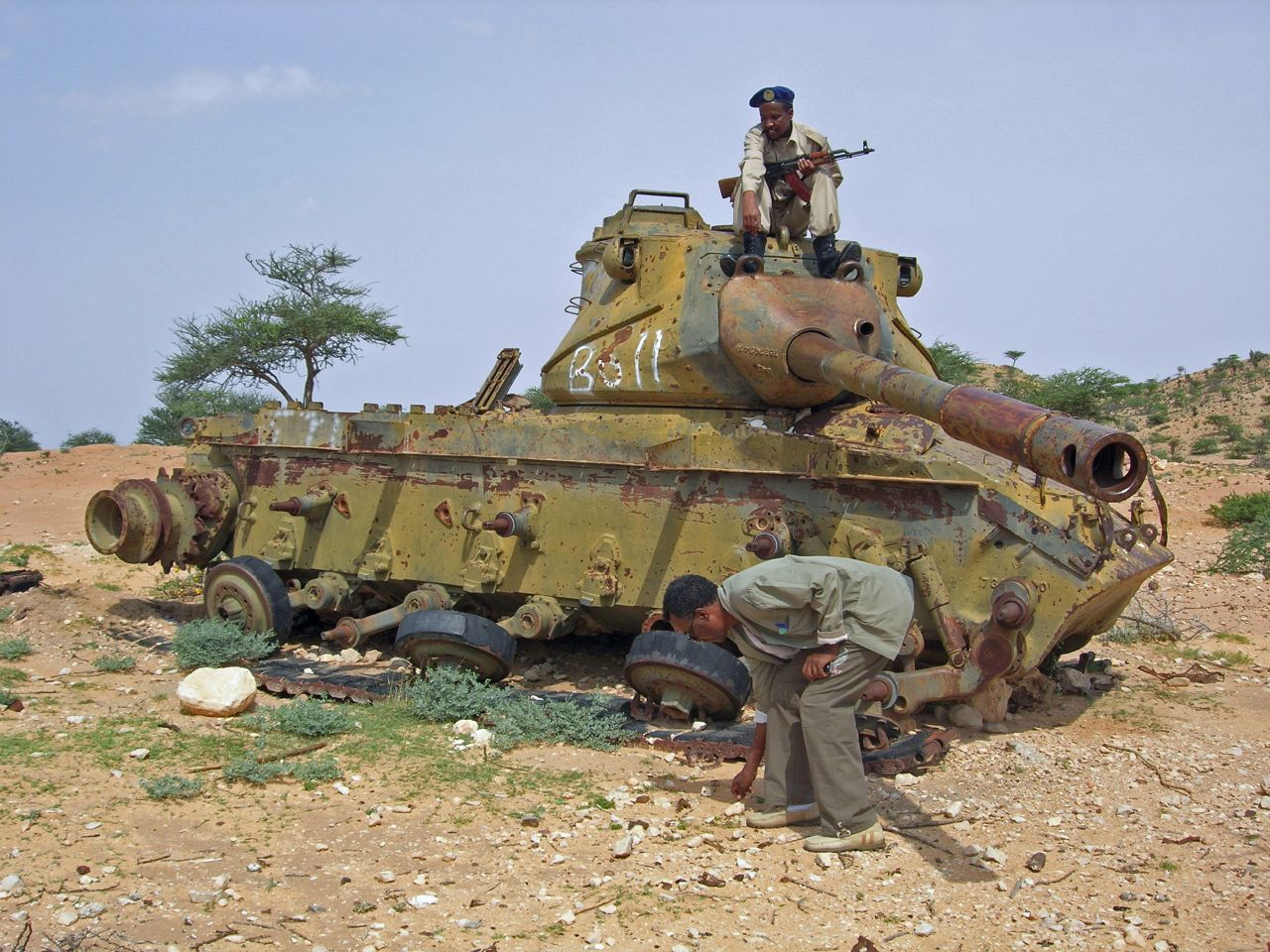
- Ruined tank in Hargeisa
- Date: 10 May 2006
- Meeting no.: 5,435
- Code: S/RES/1676 (Document)
- Subject: The situation in Somalia
- Voting summary: 15 voted for; None voted against; None abstained
- Result: Adopted

Security Council composition
- Permanent members: China; France; Russia; United Kingdom; United States
- Non-permanent members: Argentina; Rep. of the Congo; Denmark; Ghana; Greece; Japan; Peru; Qatar; Slovakia; Tanzania

United Nations Security Council Resolution 1676, adopted unanimously on May 10, 2006, after recalling previous resolutions on the situation in Somalia, particularly resolutions 733 (1992), 1519 (2003), 1558 (2004), 1587 (2005) and 1630 (2006), the Council re-established a group to monitor the arms embargo against the country for a further six months.

== Observations ==
The Security Council urged Somalia leaders to continue political dialogue and for the Transitional Federal Government to continue to establish governance over the country. It condemned the illegal flow of weapons into and through Somalia in violation of the arms embargo and acts of piracy off the Somali coast, calling for improvements to be made to the monitoring of the embargo and urging states to enforce the restrictions.

== Acts ==
Acting under Chapter VII of the United Nations Charter, the Council stressed that all countries should comply with the embargo and announced it would consider further actions to ensure compliance. The Secretary-General Kofi Annan was asked to re-establish a monitoring group to monitor the implementation of the arms embargo against Somalia, update lists on those violating the sanctions, to co-operate with a Committee established in Resolution 751 (1992), make recommendations based on its findings and suggest ways of improving the capacity of regional states to implement the embargo. The committee was also asked to make recommendations on ways of improving the effectiveness of the embargo.

Finally, the committee was requested to consider a visit to Somalia to demonstrate the council's determination to enforce the arms embargo.

== See also ==
- Disarmament in Somalia
- List of United Nations Security Council Resolutions 1601 to 1700 (2005–2006)
- Somali Civil War
