= United Nations Security Council Resolution 1972 =

UN Security Council Resolution 1972
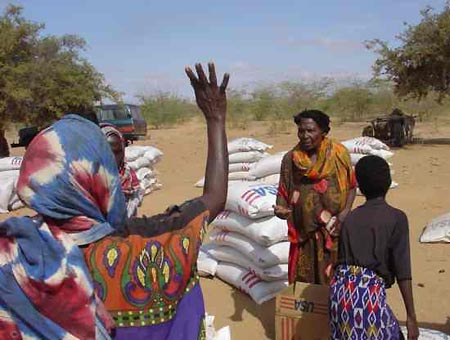
- Aid operations in Somalia
- Date: 17 March 2011
- Meeting no.: 6,496
- Code: S/RES/1972 (Document)
- Subject: The situation in Somalia
- Voting summary: 15 voted for; None voted against; None abstained
- Result: Adopted

Security Council composition
- Permanent members: China; France; Russia; United Kingdom; United States
- Non-permanent members: Bosnia–Herzegovina; Brazil; Colombia; Germany; Gabon; India; Lebanon; Nigeria; Portugal; South Africa

United Nations Security Council Resolution 1972 was adopted unanimously on 17 March 2011. After recalling previous resolutions on the situation in Somalia, particularly resolutions 733 (1992), 1844 (2008) and 1916 (2010), the Council authorised an ease on its assets freeze relating to humanitarian operations in the country for 16 months.

== Resolution ==
=== Observations ===
The preamble of the resolution condemned the flow of weapons and other assistance to and through Somalia in violation of the arms embargo, and urged states in the region to respect the embargo. The Council underlined the importance of neutrality in the provision of humanitarian assistance.

=== Acts ===
Acting under Chapter VII of the United Nations Charter, the Council urged states to comply with previous Security Council resolutions on Somalia. All parties were urged to ensure compliance with international humanitarian law within the country, while all attempts to politicise humanitarian aid operations were condemned.

The resolution exempted the work of humanitarian agencies operating in Somalia from the provisions of Resolution 1844 that obliged countries to impose financial sanctions on groups and individuals who obstructed efforts to restore peace and stability in the country, for a period of sixteen months.

Finally, the Emergency Relief Co-ordinator was asked to report by November 2011 and July 2012 on the implementation of the current resolution.

== See also ==
- List of United Nations Security Council Resolutions 1901 to 2000 (2009–2011)
- Somali Civil War
- Somali Civil War (2009–present)
