= Djiboutian–Eritrean border conflict =

2008 conflict in the Horn of Africa

2008 Djiboutian–Eritrean border conflict
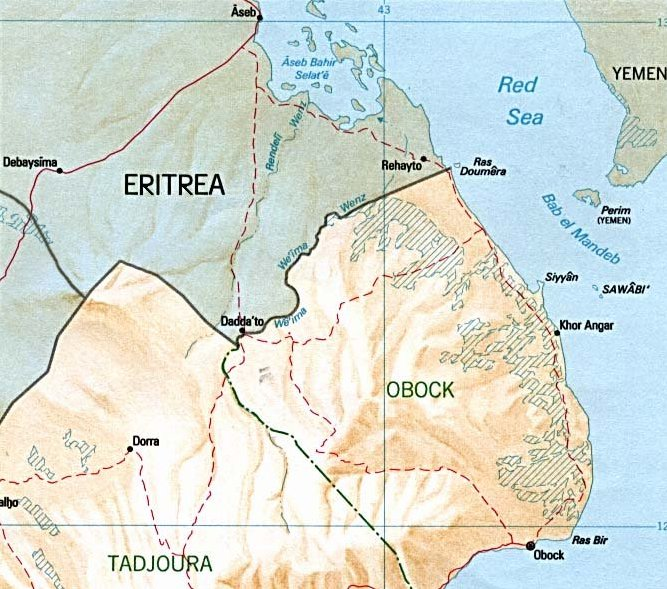
- Map of the Djibouti–Eritrea border
| Date | June 10–13, 2008 |
| Location | Ras Doumeira border region between Djibouti and Eritrea on the Red Sea Coast (12°42′30″N 43°8′0″E) |
| Result | Indecisive: Eritrean forces seize territory from Djibouti in April 2008 and withdraw in June 2010; Qatari peacekeeping forces are deployed to monitor the disputed area.; Djibouti accused Eritrea of occupying the disputed area in June 2017, following the departure of Qatari peacekeepers. |

Belligerents
| Eritrea | Djibouti; Supported by:^{[a]} France |

Commanders and leaders
| Isaias Afewerki; Sebhat Ephrem | Ismail Omar Guelleh; Ougoure Kifle Ahmed |

Casualties and losses
| 100 killed 267 captured 21 defected^{[b]} | 44 killed 55 wounded 4 captured |
- ^{a} Logistical, medical and intelligence support only.^{b} No official figures from Eritrean sources.

The Djiboutian–Eritrean border conflict (Note: Other name combinations are also used for this conflict which is also described as a war, border war, and dispute, including Eritrean-Djiboutian conflict, Eritrea-Djibouti war and Djibouti-Eritrea dispute) was a border conflict between the forces of Djibouti and Eritrea that occurred between June 10 and June 13, 2008. It was triggered by tension which began on April 16, 2008, when Djibouti reported that Eritrean armed forces had penetrated into Djibouti and dug trenches on both sides of the border. The crisis deepened when armed clashes broke out between the two armed forces in the border area on June 10, 2008. During the conflict, France provided logistical, medical and intelligence support to Djibouti, but did not participate in direct combat.

== Background ==
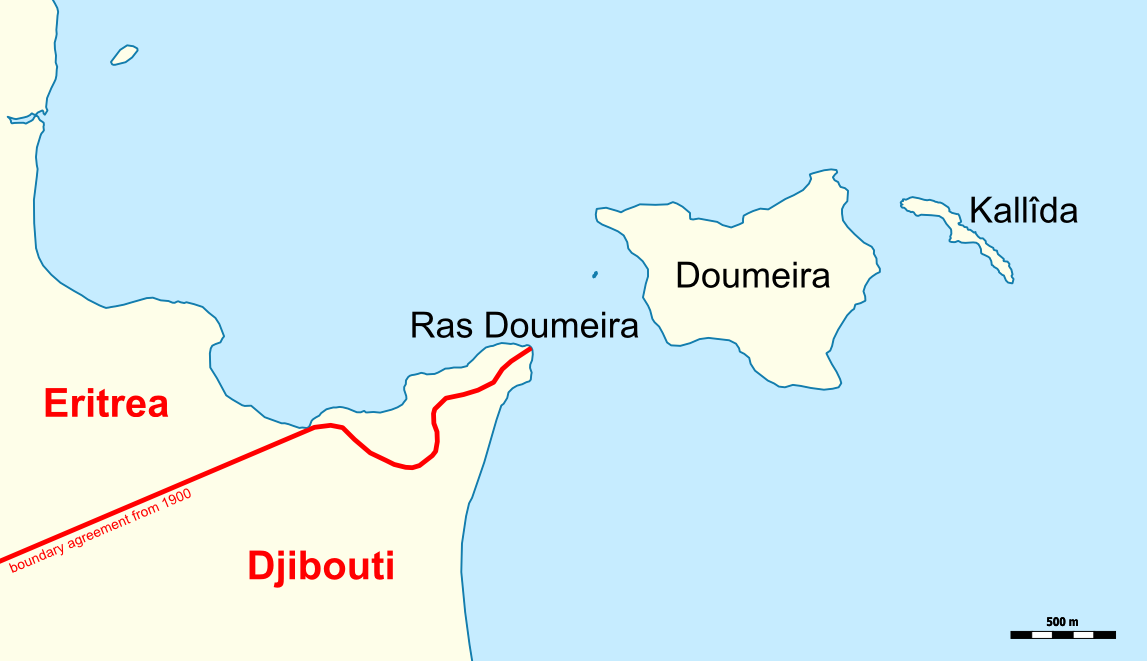
Map of the disputed Ras Doumeira region

The currently in force 1900 boundary agreement specifies that the international boundary starts at Cape Doumeira (Ras Doumeira) at the Red Sea and runs for 1.5 km along the watershed divide of the peninsula. Furthermore, the 1900 protocol specified that Île Doumeira (Doumeira Island) immediately offshore and its adjacent smaller islets would not be assigned sovereignty and would remain demilitarized. Djibouti and Eritrea had twice previously clashed over the border area. In January 1935, Italy and France signed the Franco-Italian Agreement wherein parts of French Somaliland (Djibouti) were given to Italy (Eritrea). The actual border at Ras Doumeira (a hill) though was never fully demarcated save for a broad agreement that the northern slopes of hill were Italian and the southern slopes were French and this arrangement sufficed whilst France and Italy remained in control of the area. However, the question of ratification has brought this agreement, and its provision of substantial parts of Djibouti to Eritrea into question. In April 1996 the Djiboutian government accused Eritrean forces of having made a 7 km incursion into its territory following a clash at the Djiboutian border post of Ras Doumeira. Within two days these claims had grown into accusations that the Eritrean government harbours a territorial claim to part of Djibouti's northern coastline. The allegations were then made by the foreign affairs, Mohamed Moussa Chehem, to his perplexed Eritrean counterpart, Petros Solomon, who was on an official visit to Djibouti the following day. Mr Solomon subsequently met with the Djiboutian president, who also raised the alleged incursion. In a series of contradictory accounts, the Djiboutian authorities said that they had dispatched 600 troops to the area. On April 18, Mr Solomon stated categorically in a press statement that "there has never been any clash or incident in Doumeira", adding that the Eritrean government was "surprised and saddened" by the allegations.

== Eritrean movements in Ras Doumeira region ==
In January, Eritrea reportedly requested to cross the border in order to get sand for a road, but instead occupied a hilltop in the region. On April 16, Eritrea is reported by Djibouti to have set up fortifications and dug trenches on both sides of the Djiboutian border near Ras Doumeira. Djibouti, in a letter to the UN calling for intervention, claimed new maps put out by Eritrea showed Ras Doumeira as Eritrean territory. Eritrea denied it had any problems with Djibouti.

Ethiopia's Prime Minister Meles Zenawi said on May 15 that the row was a "threat to the peace and security of the whole Horn of Africa" and said Ethiopia would secure their trade corridor through Djibouti in the event of a conflict. Ethiopia has relied on Djibouti for access to the Red Sea since Eritrea's independence. Eritrea's President Isaias Afwerki denied sending troops into the area and added they do not have any problem with Djibouti.

== Armed clashes ==
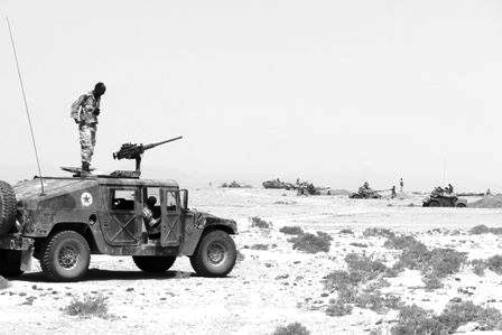
Djiboutian soldier on top of a Humvee armored vehicle near the border

On June 10, 2008, according to Djibouti, several Eritrean troops deserted their positions, fleeing to the Djiboutian side. Djiboutian forces then came under fire from Eritrean forces demanding the return of the deserters. Djibouti called up soldiers and police who had retired since 2004 in response to the fighting. Eritrea dismissed accounts from Djibouti as "anti-Eritrean". A statement from Eritrea's Foreign Ministry said it would not "get involved in an invitation of squabbles and acts of hostility" and claimed Djibouti was trying to drag Eritrea into its "concocted animosity". In an interview with the BBC on 17 June 2008, President Guelleh "France would have militarily intervened in accordance with this [defense] agreement. However, we prefer to defend our homeland ourselves and have support in logistical, medical, and military intelligence areas as they have already done.". Clashes between the two forces reportedly continued for several days before Djibouti's military announced on June 13 that fighting had subsided, but on the same day, President Guelleh, was quoted by the BBC as saying that his country was at war with Eritrea.

44 Djiboutian soldiers were killed and 55 wounded during the fighting. According to Djiboutian estimates, 100 Eritrean soldiers were killed, 100 captured, and 21 defected. Djiboutian President Guelleh declared: "We've always had good relations. But they aggressively occupied part of our country. This is an aggression we are resisting".

By 2008 the U.S. Defense Intelligence Agency estimated the army was 18,000 strong (with Eritrean army strength estimated at the same time as 200,000).

== International reaction ==
- Arab League:

The League of Arab League held an emergency session in response to the fighting and called for Eritrea to withdraw from the border region.

- France:

On April 16, 2023, the French Defense Minister, Hervé Morin was in Djibouti, promising to strengthen the French military presence in the country in case there is "an escalation in the current border row." Also to reaffirm the "very great concern of France" over the recent border incidents, Morin, according to diplomatic sources, has "reassured his counterpart of the full support" of his government, at the same time calling for a "diplomatic" settlement of the issue. The two nations have a mutual defense agreement. The French foreign ministry said it was highly concerned about the fighting. The French defense ministry announced they were increasing their military presence in Djibouti and increasing their support for Djibouti's army following the border clashes. The announcement also said France was "preparing to deploy a forward logistics base and a land force near the zone where the clashes took place", adding that "its military has stepped up air surveillance over the border to monitor the activities of Eritrean forces." Reports also indicate that additional naval forces are being moved to the region as well as an additional team of military surgeons. Finally, France supported Djibouti Forces (FAD) with various resources. France provided logistical support: transport of troops and equipment. France also provided transport and care for many wounded Djiboutian soldiers. The means of French military intelligence were also implemented for the benefit of the Djiboutian army.

- United Nations:

On December 23, 2009, the United Nations Security Council Resolution 1907 was adopted, it imposed arms embargo on Eritrea, a travel ban on its leaders, and it froze the assets of some of the country's political and military officials. The United Nations Security Council called on both sides to exercise maximum restraint and re-establish dialogue. The UN resolution was voted in particular by France. China is the only great power to have absolved.

- United States:

The US State Department issued a press release condemning Eritrea's "military aggression" saying it represented "an additional threat to peace and security in the already volatile Horn of Africa" and calling for Eritrea to accept third party mediation on the border dispute. Eritrea responded to the statement accusing the U.S. of instigating conflict in the region. The American embassy in Djibouti advised citizens against traveling to the northern Djibouti where Ras Doumeira is located for safety reasons.

- African Union:

The Peace and Security Council of the African Union urged Eritrea and Djibouti to exercise the utmost restraint and to resolve the dispute through dialogue including fully cooperating with an AU mission sent to the area. However, Eritrea, unlike Djibouti, had not yet accepted the mission. Bereket Simon, special adviser to Prime Minister Meles Zenawi of Ethiopia told Reuters, "Ethiopia firmly believes that such unwarranted action should be stopped immediately and peaceful and diplomatic solution must be sought for the problem."

== Aftermath ==
On June 24, 2008, the United Nations Security Council held a meeting at their headquarters in New York to hear a briefing of the situation, as well as statements from the Prime Minister of Djibouti Mohamed Dileita and the ambassador of Eritrea.

A UN fact-finding mission was sent to the region and issued a report saying the standoff between Djibouti and Eritrea could "have a major negative impact on the entire region and the wider international community" noting while Djibouti has pulled out of the disputed area Eritrea has not. The fact-finding mission was not allowed into Eritrea by the Eritrean government.

The United Nations Security Council passed Resolution 1862 on January 14, 2009, urging dialogue between the two countries to solve the issue peacefully. The council welcomed Djibouti's withdrawal to positions before June 10, 2008, and demanded Eritrea make a similar withdrawal within five weeks of the resolution.

On 23 December 2009, the UN Security Council imposed sanctions on Eritrea for providing support to armed groups undermining peace and reconciliation in Somalia and because it had not withdrawn its forces following clashes with Djibouti in June 2008. The sanctions were to imposed an arms embargo, travel restrictions and a freeze on the assets of its political and military leaders.

In early June 2010, Djibouti and Eritrea agreed to refer the matter to Qatar for mediation, a move that was praised by the African Union. In March 2016, 4 Djiboutian prisoners of war captured during the border war were released by Eritrea eight years after the conflict.

Following the 2017 Qatar diplomatic crisis, Qatar withdrew its peacekeeping forces from the disputed territory. Shortly after, Djibouti accused Eritrea of reoccupying the mainland hill and Doumeira Island.

In September 2018, it was announced that Djibouti and Eritrea agreed to normalize their relations.

== See also ==
- Djibouti–Eritrea relations
- Foreign relations of Djibouti
- Foreign relations of Eritrea
- Eritrean Defence Forces
- Djibouti Armed Forces
