= United Nations Security Council Resolution 1630 =

UN Security Council Resolution 1630
- Flag of Somalia
- Date: 14 October 2005
- Meeting no.: 5,280
- Code: S/RES/1630 (Document)
- Subject: The situation in Somalia
- Voting summary: 15 voted for; None voted against; None abstained
- Result: Adopted

Security Council composition
- Permanent members: China; France; Russia; United Kingdom; United States
- Non-permanent members: Algeria; Argentina; Benin; Brazil; Denmark; Greece; Japan; Philippines; Romania; Tanzania

United Nations Security Council resolution 1630, adopted unanimously on 14 October 2005, after recalling previous resolutions on the situation in Somalia, particularly resolutions 733 (1992), 1519 (2003), 1558 (2004) and 1587 (2005), the council re-established a group to monitor the arms embargo against the country for a further six months and condemned the increase in flow of weapons to the country in violation of the embargo.

Less than a day after the condemnation from the security council, illicit weapons continued to flow into Somalia.

== Observations ==
The Security council offered its support of the Somali reconciliation process, including the ongoing Somali National Reconciliation Conference. It condemned the illegal flow of weapons into and through Somalia in violation of the arms embargo, calling for improvements to be made to the monitoring of the embargo and urging states to enforce the restrictions.

== Acts ==
Acting under Chapter VII of the United Nations Charter, the council stressed that all countries should comply with the embargo. The Secretary-General Kofi Annan was asked to re-establish a monitoring group to monitor the implementation of the arms embargo against Somalia, update lists on those violating the sanctions, to co-operate with a Committee established in Resolution 751 (1992) and make recommendations. The committee was also asked to make recommendations on ways of improving the effectiveness of the embargo.

Finally, the committee was requested to consider a visit to Somalia to demonstrate the council's determination to enforce the arms embargo.

== See also ==
- Disarmament in Somalia
- List of United Nations Security Council Resolutions 1601 to 1700 (2005–2006)
- Somali Civil War
