= Somali Reconciliation Conference =

Somali Reconciliation Conference may refer to:

- Conference on National Reconciliation in Somalia (1993)
- 2002 Somali Reconciliation Conference (2002)
- 2007 Somali National Reconciliation Conference (2007)
