= Diplomatic and humanitarian efforts in the Somali Civil War =

Various international and local diplomatic and humanitarian efforts in the Somali Civil War have been in effect since the conflict first began in the early 1990s. The latter include diplomatic initiatives put together by the African Union, the Arab League and the European Union, as well as humanitarian efforts led by the Office for the Coordination of Humanitarian Affairs (OCHA), UNICEF, the World Food Programme (WFP), the Puntland Maritime Police Force (PMPF) and the Somali Red Crescent Society (SRCS).

== Diplomatic initiatives ==
=== UN Security Council Resolutions ===

On December 6, 2006, the UN Security Council passed a pair of resolutions involving Somalia:

- Resolution 1724, stresses the arms embargo on Somalia and calls all UN member nations to avoid exacerbating the conflict by shipping arms into the region.
- Resolution 1725, authorizes "IGAD and Member States of the African Union to establish a protection and training mission in Somalia." This mission was dubbed IGASOM, and for the purposes of their mission, the arms embargo was lifted to allow them to bring weapons into the country.

Somali reaction to the resolutions was generally positive for supporters of the TFG, and negative for supporters of the ICU.

IGAD and AU members balked at creating the necessary peacekeeping force. There was ICU resistance to allowing Ethiopian troops be part of the mission, for instance. Uganda, the one nation that initially committed to provide a battalion of troops, later backed away from its pledge when the Islamists threatened to attack any UN peacekeepers that entered the country. In its defense, the current crisis does not allow for peacekeepers when there is active hostilities conducted with heavy weapons (see Battle of Baidoa).

On December 26, at 3 pm New York time (2000 GMT), the UN Security Council heard a briefing on the crisis by special envoy for Somalia, Francois Lonseny Fall of Guinea. In the briefing, he said all UN and NGO staff had been evacuated from the area, including the UN Disaster Assessment and Coordination Team. The fighting had put nearly 2 million flood-affected persons at severe risk.

Kofi Annan called Ethiopian and Kenyan leaders to attempt to arrange a halt to the fighting, while the Security Council was briefed on the situation.

On December 27, the UN Security Council remained deadlocked for the second day, with council chair Qatar refusing to budge over the demand for withdrawal of Ethiopian troops from the country.

=== Intergovernmental Authority on Development ===
By the authority of UN Security Council 1725, the member states of the Intergovernmental Authority on Development IGAD and the African Union (AU) are chartered to conduct a peacekeeping mission to Somalia. Dubbed IGASOM, the mission would seek to put UN-sanctioned peacekeepers in the country for the first time since the 1992-1995 missions (UNOSOM I, UNITAF, and UNOSOM II).

On December 2, 2006, representatives of IGAD and the ICU met and published a cordial and formal communique committing the ICU to the IGAD plans. Subsequently, the ICU has declared its opposition to the mission.

IGASOM never deployed to Somalia. Instead, in early 2007, the mission was expanded to invite willing members of the broader African Union, and dubbed the African Union Mission to Somalia (AMISOM).

=== African Union ===
By the authority of UN Security Council 1725, the member states of IGAD and the African Union (AU) are chartered to conduct a peacekeeping mission to Somalia. Originally dubbed IGASOM, the mission would seek to put UN-sanctioned peacekeepers in the country for the first time since the 1992-1995 missions (UNOSOM I, UNITAF, and UNOSOM II). IGASOM never deployed to Somalia. Instead, in early 2007, the mission was expanded to invite willing members of the broader African Union, and dubbed the African Union Mission to Somalia (AMISOM).

On January 6, 2005, the original plans for the AU to put peacekeepers in Somalia was first agreed by the AU Peace and Security Council. Uganda was cited as the first nation to commit troops to the mission. Yet the mission did not materialize as planned. A year later, no AU or IGAD peacekeepers had been deployed.

On December 23, 2006, the AU issued a release signed by AU President Alpha Oumar Konaré calling for a cease fire.

On December 26, 2006, the AU implicitly backed Ethiopia's intervention on behalf of the Somali Transitional Federal Parliament of the Somali Republic. AU spokesman Patrick Mazimhaka was quoted as saying "We do not criticise Ethiopia because Ethiopia has given us ample warning that they are threatened by the Islamic Courts group."

On January 14, 2007, an AU delegation arrived in Mogadishu to discuss the deployment of international peacekeepers.

AMISOM and TFG troops had effectively pushed out al-Shabaab from Mogadishu, the Somali capital, by August 2011.

The U.N. would approve AMISOM efforts in 6 month increments, with the option to renew. Through 2012, troops have been approved to battle the al-Shabaab insurgents. On February 22, 2012, The U.N. also voted to increase the number of authorized troops to 17,700 from 12,000 and to expand the scope of the mission.

=== Yemen ===

Yemeni President Ali Abdullah Saleh met separately with both TFG and ICU representatives respectively on December 5 and December 6 to see if rapprochement might be possible between the parties. However, for now, both parties said a dialogue was impossible because of increased tensions and fighting.

=== European Union ===

On December 20, 2006, just as major hostilities were breaking out, European Union Commissioner for Development and Humanitarian Aid Louis Michel conducted shuttle diplomacy between the TFG seat in Baidoa and the ICU government seat in Mogadishu. The warring parties agreed to talk, but the conflict continued to rage on, worrying observers whether the prospects of talks are moot for now.

On December 25, the EU Presidency, held by Finland, issued a plea to end the fighting in Somalia. EU Commissioner Louis Michel likewise called for the TFG and ICU to resume talks in Khartoum.

On January 3, 2007, EU leaders met and agreed it was unlikely for them to send any peacekeepers to Somalia, and were also unclear about what financial assistance they might give a peacekeeping mission, but affirmed their interest to continue humanitarian support to the nation.

=== Arab League ===

Somalia is an official member of the League of Arab States or Arab League. On December 23, 2006, Samir Hosni, Director of African Affairs for the Arab League called for a halt to the violence. The Arab League seeks to co-sponsor peace talks with the African Union.

In Egypt, Somalia was discussed, as well as conflicts in Lebanon and Chad, at a meeting between Egyptian Foreign Minister Ahmed Aboul Gheit (also "Abu-al-Ghayt") and Sudanese Arab League envoy to Lebanon Mustafa Osman Ismail.

On December 24, 2006, in Cairo, Arab League Assistant Secretary General for Political Affairs Ahmed bin Hilli made an appeal for a cessation of fighting in an interview with al-Arabiya television of Dubai.

On December 26, an Arab League spokesman said his organization would like all hostilities to stop and warring parties to respect the binding agreements they signed before world community. He said Somalia doesn't need outside intervention and Ethiopia must leave Somalia.

=== United States ===

On December 23, 2006, US Secretary of State, Condoleezza Rice met with Ugandan Foreign Minister Sam Kutesa to urge Uganda to take a leading role in establishing peacekeeping operations in Somalia through IGAD. In 2011, the United States provided approximately $565 million in humanitarian assistance for the horn of Africa.

== Humanitarian efforts ==
=== United Nations ===
==== Office for the Coordination of Humanitarian Affairs (OCHA) ====

The UN runs various humanitarian efforts in Somalia aimed at redressing issues brought on by the protracted conflict, mainly in the southern part of the country. Eric Laroche was assigned as the UN Humanitarian Coordinator for all local relief efforts.

OCHA had deployed the United Nations Disaster Assessment and Coordination (UNDAC), but intermittently had to suspend operations due to security concerns resulting from the heavy fighting.

==== High Commissioner on Refugees (UNHCR) ====
The UNHCR has a presence throughout Puntland, Somaliland, and southern and central Somalia. Although the UNHCR's coordination program for Somalia is based in Nairobi, Kenya, the UN moved its overall headquarters for the country in 2012 to Mogadishu, Somalia's capital, on account of improved security.

The UNHCR's Deputy High Commissioner, Wendy Chamberlin, spent a great deal of time in 2006 focusing efforts on the Horn of Africa, which had been struck by terrible drought, followed by torrential floods.

On December 26, 2006, UN High Commissioner on Refugees António Guterres made an appeal to end the crisis in the region and warned of large-scale displacements if fighting continued.

Through 2012, the UNHCR expects to sustain delivery of relief supplies to affected persons so as to address the lingering effects of the 2011 Eastern Africa drought.

==== UNICEF ====
In 2006, UNICEF provided care to 250,000 out of the 330,000 people affected by floods that hit the southern Shabelle and Juba river valley areas of Somalia. Among other programs, it also operated the Bay Project 1 (BP1) camp in Baidoa near the frontlines for internally displaced persons (IDPs) who lived in the area prior to the resumption of fighting.

=== World Food Programme ===

Since November 2011, all food transported by the World Food Programme (WFP) has come by sea. The WFP ships carrying food to Somalia have been accompanied by naval escorts from Operation Atalanta and NATO; since the WFP started using naval escorts, none of the ships have been attacked en route to the ports.

The World Food Programme provided humanitarian relief to hundreds of thousands of persons in Somalia and over a million throughout the Horn of Africa during 2006. By December 2006, they had provided food to 278,000 of 455,000 affected people in the country. On December 24, 2006, a WFP-chartered Antonov-12 dropped 14 tons of food to Afmadow, which had been cut off by flooding. On December 27, 2006, WFP airdrop efforts were suspended and personnel relocated from Kismayo to Nairobi, Kenya, after the government put restrictions on flights. Ground operations continued.

On January 2, 2007, WFP operations, including UN Common Air Services (UNCAS) flights, were resumed. Offices were reopened in Bu'aale and Wajid, and deliveries of food resumed to Afmadow province. A ship docked in Mogadishu on December 26 with 4,500 tons of food, and was finally able to offload its cargo while the port underwent the change of hands from the ICU to a local sub-clan, and finally to the TFG.

In August 2011, the WFP delivered nutritional supplements to the children of Mogadishu. The WFP was limited in where they can deliver to because al-Shabaab had banned them from delivering food to areas that fall under their control.

=== Puntland Maritime Police Force ===
The Puntland Maritime Police Force is a locally recruited, professional maritime security force of the autonomous Puntland region. It is primarily aimed at preventing, detecting and eradicating piracy, illegal fishing, and other illicit activity off of the coast of Somalia, in addition to generally safeguarding the nation's marine resources.

In addition, the Force provides logistics support to humanitarian efforts, such as repairing wells; delivering relief supplies, medical supplies, food and water; rehabilitating hospitals and clinics; and refurbishing roads, airports and other infrastructure. It also offers skills training programs to local communities.

=== International Committee of the Red Cross ===

The International Committee of the Red Cross (ICRC) has been operating continuously in Somalia since 1977, when famine and the Ogaden War caused humanitarian crises. In the case of 2006, their mission has been similarly set by alternating periods of severe drought and flooding, and calamities caused by man-made war.

On December 26, 2006, Antonella Notari, spokeswoman for the ICRC, declared over 800 war wounded had been taken in at Somali hospitals since the beginning of Ethiopian air strikes. She said that thousands were leaving the war zone and that it was too early to tell whether this was a temporary displacement.

On December 31, 2006, a plane chartered by the ICRC on its way to Somalia with a load of fuel drums and aid supplies, crashed not long after taking off in Nairobi, Kenya. The crew of three survived.

From June to October 2011, the ICRC, in partnership with the SRCS, was able to open 11 new outpatient feeding programs and 9 mobile health teams. These operations have helped over 27,800 malnourished children.

=== Somali Red Crescent Society / Ururka Bisha Cas ===

The Somali Red Crescent Society (SRCS) is the national branch of the International Federation of Red Cross and Red Crescent Societies (IFRC).

The local office in Baidoa is at the literal front lines of the civil war.

Ahmed Gure of the SRCS was also on hand to witness the Ethiopian air strikes against Beledweyne on December 24, 2006:

An eyewitness told IRIN that aircraft, allegedly Ethiopian, had struck areas near the town of Beletweyne in Southern Somalia this morning. "Two jet airplanes bombarded the town this morning. They came back five times," said Ahmed Gure of the Somali Red Crescent Society (SRCS) in Beletweyne. He said the attack took about an hour. Gure said many of the town's population were only just starting to return from temporary camps after they were displaced by recent flooding, and "can ill-afford to move again, but I am afraid if the situation deteriorates they will move again."

=== Médecins Sans Frontières / Doctors Without Borders Efforts ===
Doctors Without Borders/Médecins Sans Frontières (MSF) organized flood relief earlier in 2006, in an effort known as the Galgaduud Project. It focused on nutrition, non-food related deliveries, dealt with war-related suffering, as well as medical care.

On December 23, MSF Director of Operations Bruno Jochum expressed concern if military aircraft—especially US military aircraft—might be used to drop humanitarian aid because it risks misperceptions of connection between aid workers and the military, which might make it unsafe to continue working in Somalia.

On February 16, 2007, a gunman attacked two MSF Spain staff in Baardheere. MSF doctors and staff are in the town working to reopen the largest hospital, which had been closed for the past decade. The workers were uninjured. Local clan leaders pledged their support for the work of MSF in the region.

=== CARE ===
Paul Daniels is the Assistant Country Director for CARE-Somalia

CARE estimates 1.8 million people were pushed to the brink of starvation in the region due to drought, flood and civil war combined, while it could only provide food to 600,000 persons. Over 1 million lost their homes due to flooding.

=== Save the Children ===
Save the Children joined with other humanitarian NGOs to appeal to the warring factions to end the conflict. The organization also provided humanitarian relief during the 2011 Eastern Africa drought.

=== World Vision ===
- World Vision-Somalia - Contact Details (Reuters Alertnet)
- Graham Davison - Operations Director, World Vision-Somalia

=== Mercy-USA ===
- Relief Projects in Somalia
- Help flood survivors in Somalia!

=== Norwegian Church Aid ===
On December 31, 2006, spokeswoman Kari Øyen of Norwegian Church Aid (NCA), a member of ACT, reported that 10,000 people had been displaced to Garbaharrey by recent fighting. NCA was dispensing blankets and relief supplies.

== External sources ==
- Somali Red Crescent Society (SRCS) / Ururka Bisha Cas
- The ICRC in Somalia
- Somalia Refugees in Yemen including Somalia Refugees Development Association (SOMDRA)
- IRIN humanitarian news and analysis - Somalia
