= United Nations Security Council Resolution 1725 =

UN Security Council Resolution 1725
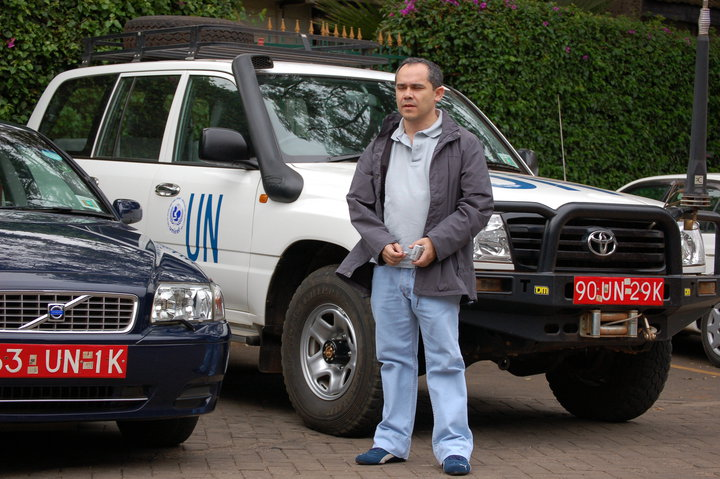
- UN vehicle
- Date: 6 December 2006
- Meeting no.: 5,579
- Code: S/RES/1725 (Document)
- Subject: The situation in Somalia
- Voting summary: 15 voted for; None voted against; None abstained
- Result: Adopted

Security Council composition
- Permanent members: China; France; Russia; United Kingdom; United States
- Non-permanent members: Argentina; Rep. of the Congo; Denmark; Ghana; Greece; Japan; Peru; Qatar; Slovakia; Tanzania

United Nations Security Council Resolution 1725, adopted unanimously on December 6, 2006, after recalling previous resolutions on the situation in Somalia, particularly resolutions 733 (1992), 1356 (2001) and 1425 (2002), the Council authorised the Intergovernmental Authority on Development (IGAD) and African Union to establish a protection and training mission in the country.

The resolution was implemented in 2007. States that bordered Somalia would not deploy troops to the IGAD-African Union mission.

== Resolution ==
=== Observations ===
The Council reiterated its commitment to resolving the crisis in Somalia through the Transitional Federal Charter. It urged all states, particularly those in the region, to refrain from actions in contravention to the arms embargo. Council members declared their willingness to engage parties that were committed to a settlement of the Somali conflict, including the Islamic Courts Union.

Meanwhile, the resolution declared that representative institutions and an inclusive political process were crucial for the stability of Somalia. It supported efforts by the Arab League and IGAD to facilitate dialogue between the Transitional Federal Institutions and Islamic Courts Union. Furthermore, the Council called on the Islamic Courts Union to end further military expansion and reject the extremist agenda or links to international terrorism.

=== Acts ===
Acting under Chapter VII of the United Nations Charter, the Council reiterated that the Transitional Federal Charter and Institutions offered the only way to peace and stability, and in this regard encouraged dialogue between the Somali parties and the fulfilment of commitments.

IGAD and African Union states were authorised to establish a protection and training mission in Somalia, that would be reviewed after six months. It had the following mandate:

(a) monitor dialogue between the Transitional Federal Institutions and the Islamic Courts Union;
(b) ensure freedom of movement and the safety of all those involved in the dialogue process;
(c) maintain and monitor security in Baidoa;
(d) protect members and infrastructure of the Transitional Federal Institutions;
(e) train the security forces of the Transitional Federal Institutions.

States that bordered Somalia would not deploy troops to the IGAD-African Union mission. The arms embargo would not apply to personnel of the IGASOM mission. Finally, the Secretary-General Kofi Annan was required to report on progress made by the operation within 30 days and every 60 days thereafter.

== See also ==
- African Union Mission to Somalia
- Diplomatic and humanitarian efforts in the Somali Civil War
- Disarmament in Somalia
- List of United Nations Security Council Resolutions 1701 to 1800 (2006–2008)
- Somali Civil War
