= Doumeira Islands =

Islands near Djibouti and Eritrea

Disputed island
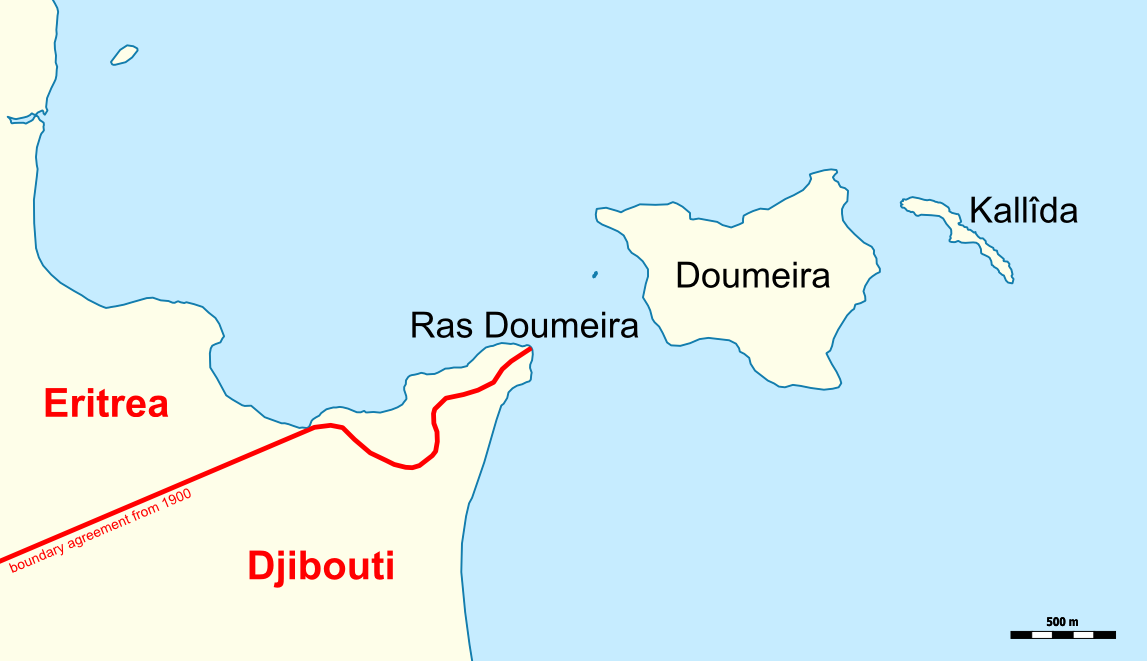
- Map of the disputed Ras Doumeira region showing the currently-in-force 1900 boundary agreement
- Interactive map of Doumeira Islands

Geography
- Location: Red Sea
- Coordinates: 12.715465°N 43.148044°E
- Total islands: 2
- Major islands: Doumeira, Kallida
- Area: 1.29 km^{2} (0.50 sq mi)
- Highest elevation: 44 m (144 ft)

Administration
- Djibouti
- Regions: Obock
- Sub-prefecture: Moulhoule

Claimed by
- Eritrea
- Regions: Southern Red Sea
- Subregions: Southern Denkalya

Demographics
- Population: Uninhabited

The Doumeira Islands (French: Douméra, Somali: Dumeera, Tigrinya: ዱሜራ, Arabic: دميرة) are situated northeast of Djibouti and east of Eritrea near the Bab el-Mandeb in the Red Sea. They consist of Doumeira, located less than one kilometer off of the Eritrean and Djiboutian shore, and the much smaller island of Kallîda, which is 250 metres (820 ft) to the east.

== History ==
The currently-in-force 1900 boundary agreement specifies that the international boundary starts at Cape Doumeira (Ras Doumeira) at the Red Sea and runs for 1.5 kilometres (0.93 mi) along the watershed divide of the peninsula. Furthermore, the 1900 protocol specified that Île Doumeira (Doumeira Island) immediately offshore and its adjacent smaller islets would not be assigned sovereignty and would remain a demilitarized neutral zone.

In January 1935, Italy and France signed the Franco-Italian Agreement wherein, among other things, a strip of territory at the northernmost end of French Somaliland (Djibouti), including the Doumeira Islands, was ceded to Italy (Eritrea). However, the question of ratification has brought this agreement, and its provision of substantial parts of Djibouti to Eritrea, into question. In April 1996 the two countries almost went to war after a Djibouti official accused Eritrea of shelling Ras Doumeira.

The area was the subject of the 2008 Djiboutian–Eritrean border conflict between the two countries. In September 2018, ten years after the conflict, it was announced that Djibouti and Eritrea agreed to normalize their relations.
