= Djibouti–Eritrea relations =

- Djibouti: Eritrea

Djibouti–Eritrea relations refers to the current and historical relationship between neighboring states Djibouti and Eritrea.

== Relations ==
During the Eritrean-Ethiopian War (1998–2000), Ethiopia channeled most of its trade through Djibouti. Though Djibouti was nominally neutral, it broke off relations with Eritrea in November 1998, renewing relations in 2000. Eritrea's President Isaias Afwerki visited Djibouti in early 2001 and Djibouti's President Ismail Omar Guelleh made a reciprocal visit to Asmara in the early summer of 2001. While Guelleh had close ties with Ethiopia's ruling Ethiopian People's Revolutionary Democratic Front (EPRDF), he has tried to maintain an even hand, developing relations with Eritrea.

== Conflict ==
On June 10, 2008 fighting broke out in the Ras Doumeira region between Djibouti and Eritrea. It resulted in Djiboutian victory and the eventual withdrawal of Eritrean forces from the border areas and the creation of a buffer zone between the two countries.

Following the 2017 Qatar diplomatic crisis, Qatar withdrew its peacekeeping forces from the disputed territory. Shortly after, Djibouti accused Eritrea of reoccupying the mainland hill and Doumeira Island.

In September 2018, it was announced that Djibouti and Eritrea agreed to normalize their relations.
