= United Nations arms embargo on Somalia =

1992–2023 weapons embargo

As a reaction to the ongoing conflict and deteriorating humanitarian situation in Somalia, the United Nations Security Council imposed an open ended arms embargo on Somalia in January 1992.

The embargo was amended to allow arms supplies to Somali Government Forces in February 2007.

On 15 November 2019 the Security Council renewed the mandate until 15 December 2020, while also extending exemptions for the arms embargo and enforcement authorizations for the ban on illicit trade.

On 1 December 2023 after 31 years the Security Council lifted the longest arms embargo on the Somali Armed Forces and the Somali federal government, while continuing sanctions against the Al-Shabaab militant group.
