= 2007 Somali National Reconciliation Conference =

The 2007 Somali National Reconciliation Conference was held from 15 July 2007 until 30 August 2007 in Mogadishu; it was announced on 1 March 2007 by Abdullahi Yusuf Ahmed, the President of the Transitional Federal Government (TFG).

== Preparations ==
More than 3,000 people from all of Somalia's regions and clans as well as from the Somali diaspora participated. The United States had announced their support for the conference. Moderate Islamists in exile in Eritrea had also been invited, but had refused to attend.

It was originally planned to be held from 16 April until mid-June, but was postponed thrice, first to 15 May 2007, then to 14 June 2007 and finally to 15 July 2007.

== Events ==
When the conference finally opened on 15 July 2007, it immediately adjourned until 19 July 2007 to allow for more delegates to arrive, since the moderate Islamists had not yet ended their boycott of the conference. The conference building was being attacked with mortars on that date, as well, and again on 17 July 2007.

The conference eventually opened for real on 19 July 2007; however, moderate Islamists and Hawiye clan elders still boycotted it, claiming that the venue were not neutral. Islamists have scheduled a conference in Asmara instead.

There was an 11-point program to be discussed at the conference, including the holding of elections. According to commentators, little was achieved at the conference.

== See also ==
- 2002 Somali Reconciliation Conference
