= United Nations Disaster Assessment and Coordination =

The United Nations Disaster Assessment and Coordination (UNDAC) is part of the international emergency response system for sudden-onset emergencies. It is designed to help the United Nations and governments of disaster-affected countries during the first phase of a sudden-onset emergency. UNDAC also assists in the coordination of incoming international relief at national level and/or at the site of the emergency. UNDAC was created in 1993 and currently is composed by 259 national experts in emergency situations, as well as by OCHA personnel and regional and international organizations, including UN agencies.

== Organization ==
The UNDAC system comprises four components:

1. Staff: Experienced emergency managers made available for UNDAC missions by their respective governments or organizations. UNDAC members are specially trained and equipped for their task.
2. Methodology: Pre-defined methods for establishing coordination structures, and for organizing and facilitating assessments and information management during the first phase of a sudden-onset disaster or emergency.
3. Procedures: Proven systems to mobilize and deploy an UNDAC team to arrive at the disaster or emergency site within 12–48 hours of the request.
4. Equipment: Personal and mission equipment for UNDAC teams to be self-sufficient in the field when deployed for disasters/emergencies

The UNDAC system has three regional teams: Europe/ Africa/ Middle East, the Americas (including the Caribbean) and Asia-Pacific. UNDAC teams can deploy at short notice (12–48 hours) anywhere in the world. They are provided free of charge to the disaster-affected country, and deployed upon the request of the United Nations Resident or Humanitarian Coordinator and/or the affected Government.

Assessment, coordination and information management are UNDAC's core mandates in an emergency response mission. Specifically in response to earthquakes, UNDAC teams set up and manage the On-Site Operations Coordination Centre (OSOCC) to help coordinate international Urban Search and Rescue (USAR) teams responding to the disaster - essential if USAR assistance is to function effectively. This concept was strongly endorsed in United Nations General Assembly resolution 57/150 of 16 December 2002, on “Strengthening the effectiveness and coordination of international urban search and rescue assistance”.
