= United Nations Security Council Resolution 1356 =

UN Security Council Resolution 1356
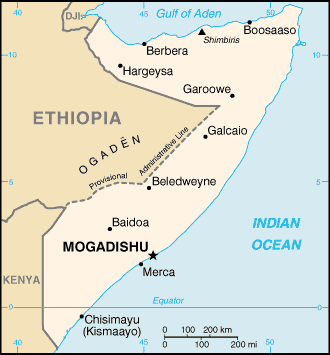
- Somalia
- Date: 19 June 2001
- Meeting no.: 4,332
- Code: S/RES/1356 (Document)
- Subject: The situation in Somalia
- Voting summary: 15 voted for; None voted against; None abstained
- Result: Adopted

Security Council composition
- Permanent members: China; France; Russia; United Kingdom; United States
- Non-permanent members: Bangladesh; Colombia; Ireland; Jamaica; Mali; Mauritius; Norway; Singapore; Tunisia; Ukraine

United Nations Security Council resolution 1356, adopted unanimously on 19 June 2001, after reaffirming resolutions 733 (1992) and 751 (1992) on the situation in Somalia, the council exempted non-lethal military equipment from the arms embargo against the country.

The security council expressed its desire for peace and security in Somalia and recognised efforts by humanitarian relief organisations and the United Nations in the country.

Acting under Chapter VII of the United Nations Charter, the council called upon all countries to comply with restrictions against Somalia. It decided that protective clothing such as flak jackets and military helmets for use by United Nations, humanitarian or media personnel would be exempt from the sanctions in addition to non-lethal military equipment approved by the committee established in Resolution 751.

== See also ==
- List of United Nations Security Council Resolutions 1301 to 1400 (2000–2002)
- Somali Civil War
