= Ras Doumeira =

Cape in Djibouti and Eritrea

Ras Doumeira: Raas Dumeera (Somali); ራስ ዱሜራ (Tigrinya)
- Cape
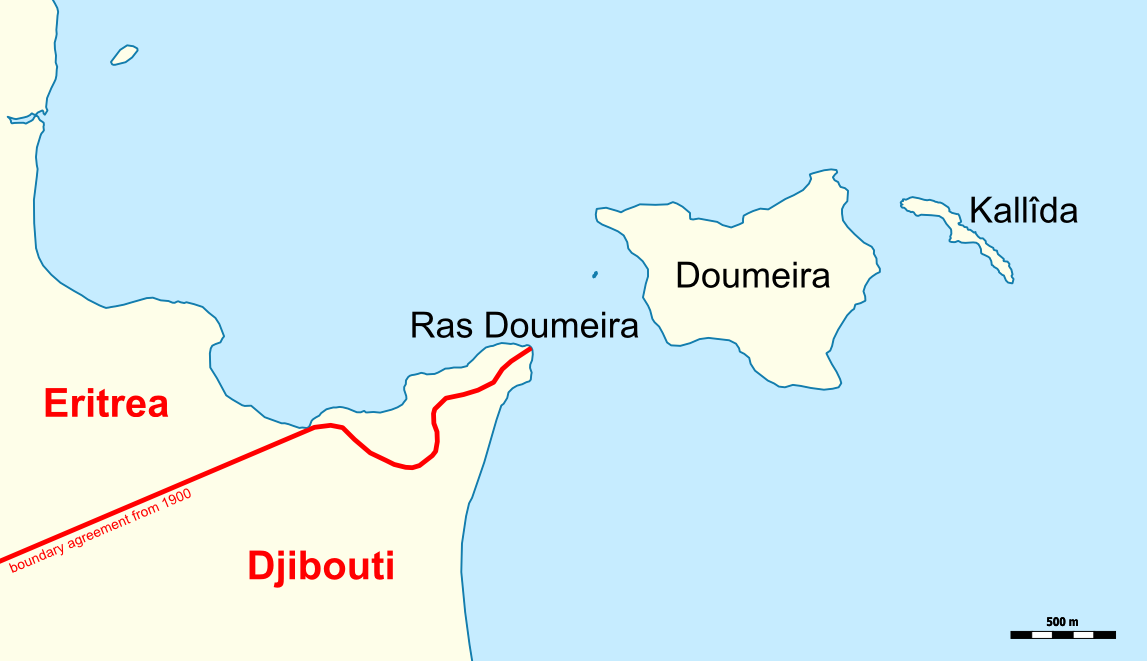
- Map of Ras Doumeira with the de facto border
- Coordinates: 12°42′40″N 43°8′0″E
- Location: Djibouti and Eritrea

Ras Doumeira (Cape Doumeira, Somali: Raas Dumeera) is a cape that extends into the Red Sea, towards the Doumeira Islands. The area is in the north of Djibouti and also borders Eritrea, and was the subject of the 2008 border dispute between the two countries. In September 2018 ten years after the conflict, it was announced that Djibouti and Eritrea agreed to normalize their relations.
