= United Nations Security Council Resolution 1558 =

UN Security Council Resolution 1558
- Somalia
- Date: 17 August 2004
- Meeting no.: 5,022
- Code: S/RES/1558 (Document)
- Subject: The situation in Somalia
- Voting summary: 15 voted for; None voted against; None abstained
- Result: Adopted

Security Council composition
- Permanent members: China; France; Russia; United Kingdom; United States
- Non-permanent members: Algeria; Angola; Benin; Brazil; Chile; Germany; Pakistan; Philippines; Romania; Spain

United Nations Security Council resolution 1558, adopted unanimously on 17 August 2004, after recalling previous resolutions on the situation in Somalia, particularly resolutions 733 (1992) and 1519 (2003), the Council re-established a group to monitor the arms embargo against the country for a further six months.

The Security Council offered its support of the Somali reconciliation process, including the ongoing Somali National Reconciliation Conference. It condemned the illegal flow of weapons into and through Somalia in violation of the arms embargo, calling for improvements to be made to the monitoring of the embargo. Acting under Chapter VII of the United Nations Charter, the Council stressed that all countries should comply with the embargo. The Secretary-General Kofi Annan was asked to re-establish a monitoring group to monitor the implementation of the arms embargo against Somalia, update lists on those violating the sanctions, to co-operate with a Committee established in Resolution 751 (1992) and make recommendations.

== See also ==
- Disarmament in Somalia
- List of United Nations Security Council Resolutions 1501 to 1600 (2003–2005)
- Somali Civil War
