= United Nations Security Council Resolution 1907 =

UN Security Council Resolution 1907
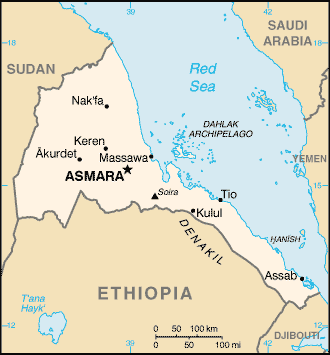
- Eritrea
- Date: 23 December 2009
- Meeting no.: 6,254
- Code: S/RES/1907 (Document)
- Subject: Peace and security in Africa
- Voting summary: 13 voted for; 1 voted against; 1 abstained
- Result: Adopted

Security Council composition
- Permanent members: China; France; Russia; United Kingdom; United States
- Non-permanent members: Austria; Burkina Faso; Costa Rica; Croatia; Japan; Libya; Mexico; Turkey; Uganda; Vietnam

United Nations Security Council Resolution 1907, adopted on December 23, 2009, imposed an arms embargo on Eritrea, travel bans on its leaders, and froze the assets of some of the country's political and military officials after accusing the Eritrean government of aiding Al-Shabaab in Somalia and reportedly refusing to withdraw troops from its disputed border with Djibouti, following a conflict in 2008. The African Union and other organisations had been calling on the Security Council to sanction Eritrea for several months.

The resolution was tabled by Uganda, and Burkina Faso led the proceeding. It was adopted by 13 votes in favor, with Libya voting against and one abstention from China. Both countries said that sanctions were not an effective method for reconciliation.

Eritrean Ambassador Araya Desta condemned the resolution, calling it "shameful" and a "fabrication of lies" by the United States and "Ethiopian regime", and stated it would not affect the country. He also denied Eritrean support of Somali militants, stating that "Somalis are our brothers". At the same time, ambassadors from Somalia and Djibouti strongly supported the outcome.

The African Union, an ardent supporter of the Somali government, had called on the Security Council to impose the sanctions. Eritrea withdrew from the African Union in protest.

== Subsequent events ==
The sanctions were reinforced on 5 December 2011. On July 16, 2012, a United Nations Monitoring Group report stated that "it had found no evidence of direct Eritrean support for al Shabaab in the past year." In October 2012, the Eritrean government has called for the lifting of the sanctions in light of the news stating that China, Russia, and South Africa have expressed support for them to be lifted. In 2017, United Nations experts wrote: "Given that the Monitoring Group has been unable to find conclusive evidence of Eritrean support for Al-Shabaab in Somalia for four consecutive mandates, the Group recommends that the Security Council consider disassociating the sanction regimes for Eritrea and Somalia."

== See also ==
- Djiboutian–Eritrean border conflict
- List of United Nations Security Council Resolutions 1901 to 2000 (2009–2011)
- Somali Civil War
