= United Nations Security Council Resolution 1766 =

UN Security Council Resolution 1766
- Date: 23 July 2007
- Meeting no.: 5,720
- Code: S/RES/1766 (Document)
- Subject: The situation in Somalia
- Voting summary: 15 voted for; None voted against; None abstained
- Result: Adopted

Security Council composition
- Permanent members: China; France; Russia; United Kingdom; United States
- Non-permanent members: Belgium; Rep. of the Congo; Ghana; Indonesia; Italy; Panama; Peru; Qatar; Slovakia; South Africa

United Nations Security Council Resolution 1766 was unanimously adopted on 23 July 2007.

== Resolution ==
Condemning an inflow of weapons that continued to threaten peace and security in Somalia, the Security Council this morning extended the mandate of the Group it established in 2004 to monitor the arms embargo on that country for an additional six months.

Through the unanimous adoption of resolution 1766 (2007), the Council requested the expert Group to continue to investigate, in coordination with relevant international agencies, violations of the weapons ban, means of transport for illicit arms and activities that generate revenues to fund weapons purchases.

It also requested the Group to work closely with the Council committee on the embargo to develop recommendations for additional measures to improve compliance and to identify ways in which States in the region could be assisted to facilitate implementation of the sanctions regime.

The arms embargo was imposed on Somalia in 1992, a year after President Muhammad Siad Barre’s regime was toppled. The country has had no functioning national Government since then and has been wracked by factional fighting.

== See also ==
- List of United Nations Security Council Resolutions 1701 to 1800 (2006–2008)
