= United Nations Security Council Resolution 1853 =

UN Security Council Resolution 1853
- Date: 19 December 2008
- Meeting no.: 6,050
- Code: S/RES/1853 (Document)
- Subject: The situation in Somalia
- Voting summary: 15 voted for; None voted against; None abstained
- Result: Adopted

Security Council composition
- Permanent members: China; France; Russia; United Kingdom; United States
- Non-permanent members: Burkina Faso; Belgium; Costa Rica; Croatia; Indonesia; Italy; Libya; Panama; South Africa; Vietnam

United Nations Security Council Resolution 1853 was unanimously adopted on 19 December 2008.

== Resolution ==
The Security Council today authorized the re-establishment of the group monitoring the arms embargo in Somalia for one year and added a fifth expert to handle the additional tasks it assigned to an expanded mandate.

Unanimously adopting resolution 1853 (2008), submitted by the United Kingdom under Chapter VII, the Council decided that the Monitoring Group established pursuant to resolution 1519 (2003) would continue the tasks outlined in paragraphs 3(a) to (c) of resolution 1844 (2008) -– which strengthened the arms embargo on the violence-plagued nation of Somalia by specifying sanctions on violators and expanding the mandate of the Committee that oversees the ban –- and carry out additionally the tasks outlined in paragraphs 23(a) to (c) of that resolution.

By today's text, the Monitoring Group would also continue to investigate all activities, including in the financial, maritime and other sectors, which generate revenues used to commit arms embargo violations. It would also, among other duties, continue to investigate any means of transport, routes, seaports, airports and other facilities used in connection with those violations.

The Monitoring Group would also continue refining and updating information on the draft list of those individuals and entities who violated the bans, first imposed by Security Council resolution 733 (1992). Among other tasks, it would assist in identifying areas where the capacities of States in the region could be strengthened to facilitate implementation of the arms embargo, as well as the measures imposed in paragraph 1, 3 and 7 of resolution 1844 (2008).

== See also ==
- List of United Nations Security Council Resolutions 1801 to 1900 (2008–2009)
