= United Nations Security Council Resolution 1862 =

UN Security Council Resolution 1862
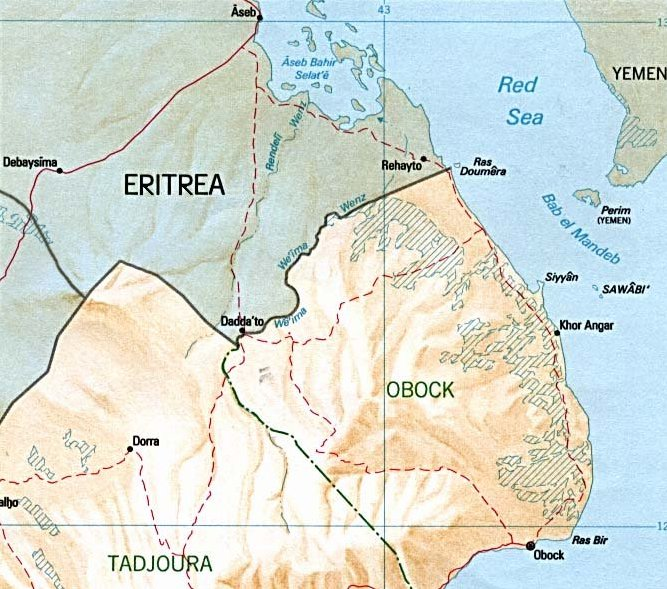
- Date: 14 January 2009
- Meeting no.: 6,065
- Code: S/RES/1862 (Document)
- Subject: Peace and security in Africa
- Voting summary: 15 voted for; None voted against; None abstained
- Result: Adopted

Security Council composition
- Permanent members: China; France; Russia; United Kingdom; United States
- Non-permanent members: Austria; Burkina Faso; Costa Rica; Croatia; Japan; Libya; Mexico; Turkey; Uganda; Vietnam

United Nations Security Council Resolution 1862 was unanimously adopted on 14 January 2009.

== Resolution ==
Expressing its deep concern about the continuing tense border dispute between Djibouti and Eritrea and its possible impact on subregional stability and security, the Security Council today urged Djibouti and Eritrea to resolve their border dispute peacefully and demanded that Eritrea withdraw its forces within five weeks to the positions before fighting broke out between the two countries on 10 June 2008.

Unanimously adopting resolution 1862 (2009), the Council demanded that Eritrea also ensure that no military presence or activity was being pursued in Ras Doumeira and Doumeira Island where the conflict took place; that it acknowledge its border dispute with Djibouti; engage actively in dialogue to defuse the tension and in diplomatic efforts leading to a mutually acceptable settlement of the border issue; and cooperate fully with the Secretary-General’s good offices.

The Council welcomed the fact that Djibouti had withdrawn its forces to the status quo ante, as called for in presidential statement S/PRST/2008/20 of 12 June 2008 and condemned Eritrea’s refusal to do so.

The Council further welcomed the offer of good offices by the Secretary-General, but deeply regretted that Eritrea had refused to grant visas to members of a United Nations fact-finding mission in September.

The Secretary-General was requested to submit a report on the situation to the Council within six weeks, after which the Council would review the situation and take a further decision.

== See also ==
- List of United Nations Security Council Resolutions 1801 to 1900 (2008–2009)
