= United Nations Security Council Resolution 1744 =

UN Security Council Resolution 1744
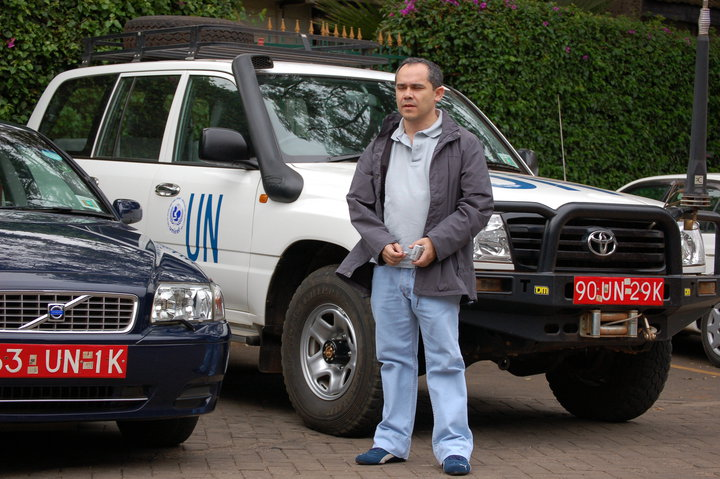
- UN vehicle
- Date: 20 February 2007
- Meeting no.: 5,633
- Code: S/RES/1744 (Document)
- Subject: The situation in Somalia
- Voting summary: 15 voted for; None voted against; None abstained
- Result: Adopted

Security Council composition
- Permanent members: China; France; Russia; United Kingdom; United States
- Non-permanent members: Belgium; Rep. of the Congo; Ghana; Indonesia; Italy; Panama; Peru; Qatar; Slovakia; South Africa

United Nations Security Council Resolution 1744, adopted unanimously on 20 February 2007, authorizing the African Union mission replacing and subsuming the IGAD Peace Support Mission in Somalia or IGASOM, which was a proposed Intergovernmental Authority on Development protection and training mission to Somalia approved by the African Union on 14 September 2006. IGASOM was also approved by the United Nations Security Council on 6 December 2006.

== History ==
On 21 February 2007, the Security Council gave the green light to the African Union to establish a mission in Somalia for six months, and requested the Secretary-General to send a technical assessment mission to look into the possibility of a United Nations peacekeeping operation following the African Union’s deployment.

Unanimously adopting resolution 1744 (2007) and acting under Chapter VII of the Charter, the Council authorized the African Union mission to take all measures, as appropriate, to carry out support for dialogue and reconciliation by assisting with the free movement, safe passage and protection of all those involved in a national reconciliation congress involving all stakeholders, including political leaders, clan leaders, religious leaders and representatives of civil society.

The Council welcomed that initiative of the Transitional Federal Institutions and President Abdullahi Yusuf Ahmed and requested the Secretary-General to assist with that congress and in promoting an ongoing all-inclusive political process, working together with the African Union, the League of Arab States and the Intergovernmental Authority for Development (IGAD).

Other elements of the mission’s mandate include: the provision of protection to the Transitional Federal Institutions and security for key infrastructure; assistance with the implementation of the National Security and Stabilization Plan; contribution to the creation of the necessary security conditions for the provision of humanitarian assistance; and protection of its personnel and facilities, as well ensuring the security and freedom of movement of its personnel. To that end, the Council lifted the arms embargo established by resolution 751 (1992) for weapons and supplies for use by the mission and for the purpose of helping develop security sector institutions, provided that States supplying such weapons and assistance would notify the sanctions committee in that regard.

== See also ==
- List of United Nations Security Council Resolutions 1701 to 1800 (2006–2008)
