= 2002 Somali Reconciliation Conference =

The 2002 Somali Reconciliation Conference, sometimes called the Eldoret conference were a series of meetings held in Eldoret, Kenya during November 2002. It was attended by most supporters of the Transitional National Government (TNG) of Somalia. The TNG was the predecessor organization of the Transitional Federal Government (TFG).

However, at the time, the Rahanweyn Resistance Army (RRA) was still hotly contending with other factions, including warlord Adan Madobe-Habsade, who captured Baidoa. The RRA accused the Juba Valley Alliance of assisting the warlord, an accusation denied by the JVA leader Barre Adan Shire Hiiraale.

Former President and member of parliament Ali Mahdi Muhammad blamed Ethiopia for interfering in the meetings. He left the conference to return to Mogadishu, saying it was a waste of time.
