= United Nations Security Council Resolution 1811 =

UN Security Council Resolution 1811
- Date: 29 April 2008
- Meeting no.: 5,879
- Code: S/RES/1811 (Document)
- Subject: The situation in Somalia
- Voting summary: 15 voted for; None voted against; None abstained
- Result: Adopted

Security Council composition
- Permanent members: China; France; Russia; United Kingdom; United States
- Non-permanent members: Burkina Faso; Belgium; Costa Rica; Croatia; Indonesia; Italy; Libya; Panama; South Africa; Vietnam

United Nations Security Council Resolution 1811 was unanimously adopted on 29 April 2008.

== Resolution ==
Condemning flows of weapons and ammunition supplies to and through Somalia as a serious threat to peace and stability in that country, the Security Council reiterated this morning^{what date?} its intention to consider specific action to improve implementation of and compliance with the arms embargo in Somalia, as it extended for six months the mandate of the group tasked with monitoring those measures.

The Council first established the arms embargo on all delivery of weapons and military equipment to Somalia under the terms of Council resolution 733 (1992), with subsequent amendments. This morning^{what date?}, it unanimously adopted resolution 1811 (2008), under Chapter VII of the United Nations Charter, asking the Monitoring Group on Somalia to continue to investigate, in coordination with relevant international agencies, violations of the weapons ban, means of transporting illicit arms and activities that generate revenues to fund weapons purchases, and make recommendations in that regard.

By other terms, the Council requested the Monitoring Group to work closely with the Council Committee established pursuant to resolution 751 (1992) on the embargo, and submit through it the Group's final report no later than 15 days prior to the termination of its mandate.

== See also ==
- List of United Nations Security Council Resolutions 1801 to 1900 (2008–2009)
