= United Nations Security Council Resolution 1519 =

UN Security Council Resolution 1519
- Date: 16 December 2003
- Meeting no.: 4,885
- Code: S/RES/1519 (Document)
- Subject: The situation in Somalia
- Voting summary: 15 voted for; None voted against; None abstained
- Result: Adopted

Security Council composition
- Permanent members: China; France; Russia; United Kingdom; United States
- Non-permanent members: Angola; Bulgaria; Chile; Cameroon; Germany; Guinea; Mexico; Pakistan; Spain; Syria

United Nations Security Council resolution 1519 was adopted unanimously on 16 December 2003. After recalling resolutions on the situation in Somalia, particularly resolutions 733 (1992), 1356 (2001), 1407 (2002), 1425 (2002) and 1474 (2003), the council requested the establishment of a monitoring group to investigate violations of the arms embargo against the country.

== Resolution ==
=== Observations ===
The Security Council reiterated its concern at the continued flow of weapons and ammunition to and through Somalia from outside sources and therefore it was important to continue monitoring and improving the implementation of the arms embargo. Meanwhile, it reiterated its support for the reconciliation process in the country, including the recent Reconciliation Conference, and insisted that all states, particularly those in the region, should refrain from interfering in the internal affairs of Somalia as such interference would destabilise the country. The situation in the country continued to pose a threat to international peace and security.

=== Acts ===
Acting under Chapter VII of the United Nations Charter, the council stressed complicity of all states with resolutions 733 and 1356, and that non-compliance constituted a violation of the United Nations Charter. It decided to re-establish a panel of four experts appointed by the Secretary-General and based in Nairobi for six months to investigate violations of the arms embargo by land, air and sea; detail information related to the violations and to enforcement of the embargo; carry out field research in Somalia and other countries; assess the capacity of states in the region to fully implement the arms embargo, including by review of national customs and border control; and to recommend steps to strengthen its enforcement. Furthermore, the panel was required to have access to expertise in areas of civil aviation, maritime transport, regional affairs and knowledge of the country and report to the committee established in Resolution 751 (1992) with a list of violators both inside and outside Somalia.

The resolution requested the full co-operation of neighbouring states, the Transitional National Government (TNG) in Somalia, and other entities or individuals by providing unhindered access to information for the expert panel and for states to provide information on violations of the arms embargo; instances of non-compliance were to be reported to the council. Neighbouring states were requested to report quarterly on steps taken to implement the embargo and were encouraged to enact and implement legislation to give effect to the implementation. Regional organisations, the African Union and League of Arab States were called upon to assist the Somali parties in the implementation of the embargo and the monitoring group.

== See also ==
- Disarmament in Somalia
- List of United Nations Security Council Resolutions 1501 to 1600 (2003–2005)
- Somali Civil War
