= United Nations Security Council Resolution 1844 =

2008 resolution relating to Somalia

UN Security Council Resolution 1844
- Date: 20 November 2008
- Meeting no.: 6,019
- Code: S/RES/1844 (Document)
- Subject: The situation in Somalia
- Voting summary: 15 voted for; None voted against; None abstained
- Result: Adopted

Security Council composition
- Permanent members: China; France; Russia; United Kingdom; United States
- Non-permanent members: Burkina Faso; Belgium; Costa Rica; Croatia; Indonesia; Italy; Libya; Panama; South Africa; Vietnam

United Nations Security Council Resolution 1844 was unanimously adopted on 20 November 2008.

== Resolution ==
The Security Council today strengthened the arms embargo on the violence-plagued nation of Somalia by specifying sanctions on violators and expanding the mandate of the Committee that oversees the ban.

Through the unanimous adoption of resolution 1844 (2008), and acting under the Charter’s Chapter VII, the Council decided that travel restrictions and an asset freeze would be applied to individuals and entities that engaged in activities that threatened the peace and the political processes and obstructed humanitarian assistance, in addition to those that breached the weapons ban, which was put in place by resolution 733 of 1992 and amended by subsequent resolutions.

The Council charged the Committee set up by resolution 733 (1992) with the task of examining allegations of violations of the arms embargo, designating individuals and entities to be on a list of those subjected to sanctions and regularly reviewing that list for accuracy. It would also consider requests for humanitarian exemptions and report at least every 120 days to the Council.

In a related provision, Member States were encouraged to submit to the Committee the names of individuals or entities to be included on the list, along with a detailed statement of the case against them. The Council urged such States to review petitions for de-listing and encouraged the Committee to ensure that fair and clear procedures existed for listing, de-listing and granting exemptions.

== See also ==
- List of United Nations Security Council Resolutions 1801 to 1900 (2008–2009)
