= Disarmament in Somalia =

2006 disarmament process in Somalia

After two decades of violence and civil war (which began in 1986) and after the Transitional Federal Government (TFG) of Somalia captured Mogadishu and Kismayo, the TFG attempted to disarm the militias of the country in late 2006. According to the UN/World Bank's Joint Needs Assessment (JNA) coordination secretariat, "the total estimated number of militias [militia members] to be demobilized is 53,000." In 2005, they estimated that "there are 11–15,000 militia people controlling Mogadishu (out of national estimates ranging from 50,000 to 200,000)."

== Past efforts ==
Since the 1991 war, there have been over a dozen attempts to bring an end to the Somali Civil War. They were often shoaled by warlords and inter-clan rivalries.

== Recent efforts ==
=== 2006 ICU attempt to disarm warlords ===
In 2006, the Islamic Courts Union (ICU) attempted to disarm the secular warlords—a contentious issue which led to the Second Battle of Mogadishu. The Islamist victory resulted in the routing or forced surrender of many warlords and their caches of arms, and the rapid rise of the Islamic Courts Union. By late 2006, their attempts to disarm the secular militias and their consolidation of power pitted them also against the Transitional Federal Government.

The ICU attempted to curb the private possession of weapons, closing down the infamous Mogadishu arms market, and impounding or appropriating technicals for use solely by the Islamic Courts forces:

We were skeptical, but everyone we have spoken to since– doctors, teachers, journalists, shopkeepers– has talked of a city transformed. Gone are the ubiquitous checkpoints where the warlords’ militias killed, extorted and stole. Gone are their technicals, Jeeps with heavy machine guns mounted on the back. The infamous Bakaro arms markets has been closed. The only guns and technicals now are those of the Sharia courts enforcers, and the reports of violence in the papers were of the Ipswich murders.

Many Somali warlords, along with the nation of Ethiopia, sided with the TFG against the ICU. Once the momentous battles were concluded in December 2006, the TFG proceeded with its plans to bring a general disarmament of the nation and closure to the Somali Civil War.

=== December 2006 ===
On December 29, 2006, Mohamed Qanyare, a Mogadishu warlord, returned to the city and made a plea for the federal government to not disarm the militias. Qanyare was former TFG Security Minister before losing his position as a result of the Second Battle of Mogadishu. On December 31, surrounded in headquarters compound by a dozen technicals, he claimed to have 1,500 men under his command, and asserted government control over Mogadishu was an illusion, owed to the military might of Ethiopia.

Ghedi's decree for disarmament also applied to non-government troops in the autonomous state of Puntland, where it was seen as questionably enforceable.

=== January 2007 ===
==== Announcement of weapons collections and amnesty ====
On January 1, 2007, Somali Prime Minister Ali Mohammed Ghedi announced "The warlord era in Mogadishu is now over."

He said all civilian groups and businesses would have three days to disarm and turn their weapons in to the government. Technicals were to be brought to the old port in Mogadishu. All collected arms would be registered at Villa Somalia. Villa Baidoa was also mentioned as an arms collection point. An amnesty to Islamists was also extended.

Ghedi also made an appeal for international aid efforts to continue, and for the establishment of a peacekeeping force (see IGASOM).

On January 2, Prime Minister Ghedi met with leaders of the Ayr subclan of the Habar-Gidir clan, a branch of the Hawiye tribe, to reassure the subclan regarding disarmament and to establish how they would work with the TFG. They had been supporters of the ICU.

Abdi Qeybdid called for restoring peace and stability in the country. He asked that no reprisals be taken against the Islamists, and said he is not interested in getting back the battle wagons he had lost in the conflict, but hoped they were turned over to the government.

On January 3, Police Commander Ali Mohamed Hassan Loyan, who has only 1,000 officers under his command, admitted he was vastly outgunned: "I cannot say there is a viable police operation in Mogadishu." Meanwhile, the infamous Bakaara Market had re-opened and was doing brisk business.

Two other warlords, including MP Mohamed Qanyare Afrah and his ally Abdi "Waal" Nur Siad, questioned the government plan for a weapons turn-over without a plan for the protection of politicians.

A group of 20 militia turned in their weapons, along with a machine gun mounted technical, in hopes of joining the newly forming army.

On January 4, government and Ethiopian forces began disarming residents of Jilib following an attack which killed two soldiers and wounded two others.

In Mogadishu, TFG militias set up checkpoints in the city. At one checkpoint, a group of militia apparently attempted to extort money from the driver of an oil tanker truck. In the ensuing argument, a rocket was fired at the vehicle, injuring at least 2 or 3 people. The vehicle had been carrying dozens of passengers who disembarked before the rocket attack.

On January 5, 1,000 soldiers from Puntland traveled to Mogadishu to help in the disarmament of the capital. In Marka, Lower Shabelle, at least four people were killed in inter-militia fighting; two other militia and two civilians were wounded.

==== Riots in Mogadishu ====
On January 6, a crowd of more than 100 rioters gathered near Tarabunka square in Mogadishu. They protested the presence of Ethiopian troops as well as the plans to disarm the populace. Prime Minister Ghedi issued a decision to postpone the disarmament for an indefinite amount of time. At least seven were injured as police fired shots to disburse demonstrations around the city.

==== Agreement to Disarm ====
On January 12, the same day as the Battle of Ras Kamboni ended, Somali warlords tentatively agreed with President Abdullahi Yusuf to disarm their militias and to direct their members to apply to join the national army or police forces. An estimated 20,000 militia were said to exist throughout Somalia. Mohamed Qanyare Afrah said the clans were "fed up" with militias and agreed to disarm his own men. Muse Sudi Yalahow was less conciliatory.

Meanwhile, even as the meeting was taking place, fighting outside Villa Somalia killed seven people. The members of government and warlords present for the meeting included the following individuals:

- President Abdullahi Yusuf Ahmed
- Prime Minister Ali Mohammed Ghedi
- Defense Minister Col. Barre Hirale - former leader of the JVA
- Mohamed Qanyare Afrah - MP
- Muse Sudi Yalahow - MP, former leader of ARPCT
- Omar Filish - MP
- Botan Ise Alin - MP
- Col. Abdi Qeybdiid - leader of the self-declared state of Galmudug
- Abdi Waal

==== Martial law declared ====
On January 13 the Transitional Federal Parliament (TFP), by a count of 154-to-2, voted to give the President the power to declare martial law to restore order. Yet on the same day, 9 people were reported killed in fighting in Biyo-Adde in central Somalia. Prime Minister Gedi first stated that martial law would be declared on December 29, 2006; parliament's vote vested the government with the proper legal authority.

Given their new powers, on January 15, 2007, the TFG closed the radio stations for Shabelle Radio, Horn Afrik, IQK, and the television station Al-Jazeera in Mogadishu. The ban was lifted a day later.

==== Warlords turn in arms ====
On January 17, 2007, Mohamed Qanyare and Muse Sudi Yalahow were the first warlords of Mogadishu to disarm, turning over their weapons and committing their militiamen to the government, though some of Sudi's arms remained in other locations controlled by Qanyare and Mohammed Dhere. Approximately 60 technicals and 600 soldier's weapons were turned in to the government, including two technicals turned in by Interior Minister Hussein Mohammed Farah Aidid. The arms were accepted by the chief commander of the government army, General Naji.

==== Call for National Reconciliation Conference ====
On January 30, 2007, President Yusuf called for a new national reconciliation conference to be held within three weeks. In related news, a commitment for 4,000 peacekeepers had been made by the AU, and the search continued for another 4,000 to constitute the full planned contingent.

Eventually, the 2007 Somali National Reconciliation Conference was called on 2007-03-01 to begin on 16 April 2007.
