= United Nations Security Council Resolution 733 =

UN Security Council Resolution 733
- Somalia
- Date: 23 January 1992
- Meeting no.: 3,039
- Code: S/RES/733 (Document)
- Subject: Somalia
- Voting summary: 15 voted for; None voted against; None abstained
- Result: Adopted

Security Council composition
- Permanent members: China; France; Russia; United Kingdom; United States
- Non-permanent members: Austria; Belgium; Cape Verde; Ecuador; Hungary; India; Japan; Morocco; Venezuela; Zimbabwe

United Nations Security Council resolution 733, adopted unanimously on 23 January 1992, after expressing its alarm at the situation in Somalia regarding the heavy loss of life, destruction to property and threat to regional stability, the council, acting under Chapter VII of the United Nations Charter, decided to place a "general and complete" arms embargo on the country for the purposes of establishing peace and stability. The situation was brought to the attention of the security council by the Somali government.

The council called upon then Secretary-General Boutros Boutros-Ghali to immediately undertake actions to increase humanitarian assistance by the United Nations and other international organisations to the affected population in Somalia. It also requested him, along with the Secretaries-General of the Organisation of African Unity and Arab League to contact all the factions involved in order to end hostilities and permit the delivery of aid.

Resolution 733 urged all parties to guarantee the safety of all humanitarian personnel in Somalia and urged all Member States to contribute to the aid effort. The resolution did not include proposals for a peacekeeping force as some Member States were reluctant on financial grounds, and also others, such as the United States, stated they would not intervene at this stage as there was no invitation from the main host parties.

== See also ==
- History of Somalia
- List of United Nations Security Council Resolutions 701 to 800 (1991–1993)
- Somali Civil War
