= Arms embargo =

Temporary halt to the trade of weapons punished by sanctions

An arms embargo is a restriction or a set of sanctions that applies either solely to weaponry or also to "dual-use technology." An arms embargo may serve one or more purposes:

- to signal disapproval of the behavior of a certain actor
- to maintain neutrality in an ongoing conflict
- as a peace mechanism that is part of a peace process to resolve an armed conflict
- to limit the ability of an actor to inflict violence on others
- to weaken a country's military capabilities before a foreign intervention

== Historical examples ==
=== Argentina ===
US President Jimmy Carter imposed an arms embargo on the military government of Argentina in 1977 in response to human rights abuses.

An arms embargo was put in place, along with other economic sanctions by the European Economic Community (EEC), within a week of the 1982 invasion of the Falkland Islands by Argentina, two British dependent territories in the South Atlantic. The European nations ended the embargo after the end of the ensuing Falklands War, and Argentina looked to Western European countries and Israel for arms supplies during the US embargo until it was lifted in 1989.

=== Indonesia ===
The US government imposed an arms embargo against Indonesia in 1999 because of human rights violations in East Timor. The embargo was lifted in 2005.

=== Iran ===
The United States imposed economic sanctions against Iran following the Iranian Revolution in 1979. However, to secure the release of American hostages, several senior Reagan administration officials secretly facilitated the sale of arms to Iran in the 1980s in a scandal called the Iran–Contra affair. In 1995, the US expanded sanctions to include firms dealing with the Iranian government.

In March 2007, UN Security Council Resolution 1747 tightened the sanctions imposed on Iran in connection with the Iranian nuclear program. The sanctions were lifted on 16 January 2016.

In September 2020, US Secretary of State Mike Pompeo announced the imposition of an arms embargo on the Iranian Ministry of Defence and Armed Forces Logistics and other entities involved in Iran's nuclear program, including the government of the disputed Venezuelan President Nicolás Maduro for providing weapons to Iran.

On 18 October 2020, Iran announced that the United Nations conventional arms embargo imposed on the country in 2007 had expired. The embargo had barred Iran from purchasing arms, including tanks and fighter jets, from foreign nations. The embargo was lifted as per the conditions under Iran's 2015 nuclear deal with world leaders, despite US objections.

=== Israel ===
During 2024, due to the genocide in Gaza, several countries such as Italy, Japan, Spain, Canada, Colombia, the Netherlands and Belgium have ceased the sale of weapons to Israel. Key US allies such as Britain and France are debating it. However the United States and Germany as the major suppliers of Israel's arms imports keep supplying lethal weapons in spite of growing criticism of the mounting civilian casualties. On May 20, 2025, Spain’s parliament has voted to enshrine in law an arms embargo on Israel that the prime minister, Pedro Sánchez, introduced to end “the genocide in Gaza”. During the vote to approve the decision, 178 members of parliament voted in favor, and 169 members of parliament from the right and far-Right voted against the proposal. The Spanish arms embargo would completely prevent the sale of weapons to Israel and the purchase of Israeli weapons by Spain.

=== People's Republic of China ===
The United States and the European Union stopped exporting arms to China after 1989 after the suppression of protests in Tiananmen Square. In 2004 and 2005, there was some debate in the EU over whether to lift the embargo.

=== Somalia ===
On 1 December 2023 after 31 years the United Nations Security Council lifted the longest arms embargo on the Somali Armed Forces and the Somali federal government, while continuing sanctions against the Al-Shabaab militant group.

=== South Africa ===
UN Security Council Resolution 418 applied an arms embargo of South Africa in 1977 on dual-use items. The embargo was lifted by Resolution 919 in 1994.

=== United States ===
To protest the Vietnam War, Sweden imposed an arms embargo on the United States in 1966. That notably deprived Navy SEALs of the Carl Gustav m/45 submachine gun, which resulted in the creation of the Smith & Wesson M76.

=== Yugoslavia ===
The United Nations Security Council Resolution 713 applied arms embargo on Yugoslavia in 1991. Weakly enforced security assurances and deterrence contributed to the Srebrenica massacre.

== List of current arms embargoes ==
The countries included in the list are under arms embargo of the UN or another international organization such as the EU and the OSCE and others) or a country. In some cases the arms embargo is supplemented by a general trade embargo, other sanctions (financial), or travel ban for specific persons. In some cases, the arms embargo applies to any entity residing or established in the country, but in others. it is partial with the recognized government's forces and international peacekeepers being exempted from the embargo.

=== Arms embargo by UN ===
- Democratic Republic of the Congo (non-governmental forces by UN, EU), 2003/1993–
- Haiti (by UN), 2022–
- Iraq (non-governmental forces by UN, EU), 2004–
- Libya (by UN, EU) 2011–
- North Korea (by UN, EU), arms and luxury goods, 2006–
- Lebanon (non-governmental forces by UN, EU), 2006–
- South Sudan (by UN) 2018–
- Sudan (by UN, EU), 2004/1994– (UN/EU)
- Yemen (by UN, EU), 2015–

==== Former embargos ====
- Eritrea (by UN, EU), 2010–2018
- Guinea (by EU), 2009–2014
- Iran (by UN, EU), 2006–2020
- Ivory Coast (by UN, EU), 2004–2016
- Rwanda (by UN in Resolution 918 and EU) (UN: 1994–2008, EU)
- Sierra Leone (by UN and EU), 1997–2010
- Somalia (by UN, EU), 1992/2002–2023 (UN/EU)
- Yugoslavia (by UN in Resolution 713 and EU) (UN/EU: September 1991)
- Central African Republic (by UN, EU), 2013–2024

=== Arms embargo by others ===
- Argentina (by the United Kingdom) 1982–
- Belarus (by EU), 2011–
- Cuba (by US), 1958–
- Egypt (by EU), 2013–
- Myanmar (by EU), 1990–
- People's Republic of China (by EU/US), 1989–
- Venezuela (by EU), 2017–
- Syria (by the Arab League), 2011–
- Zimbabwe (by EU), 2002–
- Israel (by Spain), 2025-

==== Former embargos ====
- Armenia (by OSCE), 1992–2025
- Azerbaijan (by OSCE), 1992–2025
- Syria (by EU), 2011–2013
- Turkey (by US) 1975–1978
- Uzbekistan (by EU), 2005–2009
- Vietnam (by US) 1984–1995

== See also ==
- Arms control
- Arms Export Control Act (United States)
- Arms industry
