= List of United Nations Security Council Resolutions 1701 to 1800 =

This is a list of United Nations Security Council Resolutions 1701 to 1800 adopted between 11 August 2006 and 20 February 2008.

Resolution	Date	Vote	Concerns
1701	11 August 2006	15–0–0	Demands ceasefire in the 2006 Lebanon War
1702	15 August 2006	15–0–0	Extends mandate of the United Nations Stabilisation Mission in Haiti
1703	18 August 2006	15–0–0	Extends mandate of the United Nations Office in East Timor
1704	25 August 2006	15–0–0	Establishes the United Nations Integrated Mission in East Timor
1705	29 August 2006	15–0–0	Terms of judges at the International Criminal Tribunal for Rwanda
1706	31 August 2006	12–0–3 (abstentions: China, Qatar, Russia)	Expands mandate of the United Nations Mission in Sudan to include deployments in Darfur
1707	12 September 2006	15–0–0	Extends authorisation given to the International Security Assistance Force in Afghanistan
1708	14 September 2006	15–0–0	Extends mandate of expert group monitoring sanctions against Côte d'Ivoire
1709	22 September 2006	15–0–0	Extends mandate of the United Nations Mission in Sudan
1710	29 September 2006	15–0–0	Extends mandate of the United Nations Mission in Ethiopia and Eritrea
1711	29 September 2006	15–0–0	Extends mandate of the United Nations Organisation Mission in the Democratic Republic of the Congo
1712	29 September 2006	15–0–0	Extends mandate of the United Nations Mission in Liberia
1713	29 September 2006	15–0–0	Extends mandate of expert panel monitoring sanctions against Darfur, Sudan
1714	6 October 2006	15–0–0	Extends mandate of the United Nations Mission in Sudan
1715	9 October 2006	Adopted by acclamation	Recommends Ban Ki-moon as the Secretary-General of the United Nations
1716	13 October 2006	15–0–0	Extends mandate of the United Nations Observer Mission in Georgia
1717	13 October 2006	15–0–0	Terms of judges at the International Criminal Tribunal for Rwanda
1718	14 October 2006	15–0–0	Imposes sanctions on North Korea following a claimed nuclear test
1719	25 October 2006	15–0–0	Establishes the United Nations Integrated Office in Burundi
1720	31 October 2006	15–0–0	Extends mandate of the United Nations Mission for the Referendum in Western Sahara
1721	1 November 2006	15–0–0	Peace process in Côte d'Ivoire
1722	21 November 2006	15–0–0	Extends mandate of the EUFOR Althea for 12 months
1723	28 November 2006	15–0–0	Extends authorisation of the Multi-National Force – Iraq
1724	29 November 2006	15–0–0	Re-establishes expert group monitoring arms embargo against Somalia
1725	6 December 2006	15–0–0	Authorises training and protection mission for Somalia
1726	15 December 2006	15–0–0	Extends mandate of the United Nations Operation in Côte d'Ivoire and French forces
1727	15 December 2006	15–0–0	Extends mandate of expert panel monitoring sanctions against Côte d'Ivoire
1728	15 December 2006	15–0–0	Extends mandate of the United Nations Peacekeeping Force in Cyprus
1729	15 December 2006	15–0–0	Extends mandate of the United Nations Disengagement Observer Force
1730	19 December 2006	15–0–0	General issues relating to sanctions
1731	20 December 2006	15–0–0	Renews arms, travel and diamond embargoes against Liberia
1732	21 December 2006	15–0–0	General issues relating to sanctions
1733	22 December 2006	Adopted by acclamation	Tribute to out-going Secretary-General Kofi Annan
1734	22 December 2006	15–0–0	Extends mandate of the United Nations Integrated Office in Sierra Leone
1735	22 December 2006	15–0–0	Measures against Al-Qaeda and the Taliban
1736	22 December 2006	15–0–0	Increases strength of the United Nations Organisation Mission in the Democratic Republic of the Congo
1737	23 December 2006	15–0–0	Sanctions Iran over its nuclear programme
1738	23 December 2006	15–0–0	Condemns attacks against journalists in conflict situations
1739	10 January 2007	15–0–0	Extends mandate of the United Nations Operation in Côte d'Ivoire and French forces
1740	23 January 2007	15–0–0	Establishes the United Nations Mission in Nepal
1741	30 January 2007	15–0–0	Extends mandate of the United Nations Mission in Ethiopia and Eritrea
1742	15 February 2007	15–0–0	Extends mandate of the United Nations Organisation Mission in the Democratic Republic of the Congo
1743	15 February 2007	15–0–0	Extends mandate of the United Nations Stabilisation Mission in Haiti
1744	21 February 2007	15–0–0	Authorises the African Union Mission to Somalia
1745	22 February 2007	15–0–0	Extends mandate of the United Nations Integrated Mission in East Timor; increases strength
1746	23 March 2007	15–0–0	Extends mandate of the United Nations Assistance Mission in Afghanistan
1747	24 March 2007	15–0–0	Further sanctions Iran over its nuclear programme
1748	27 March 2007	15–0–0	Extends mandate of the United Nations International Independent Investigation Commission in Lebanon
1749	28 March 2007	15–0–0	Ends requirement of notification of weapons exports to Rwanda
1750	30 March 2007	15–0–0	Extends mandate of the United Nations Mission in Liberia
1751	13 April 2007	15–0–0	Extends mandate of the United Nations Organisation Mission in the Democratic Republic of the Congo
1752	13 April 2007	15–0–0	Extends mandate of the United Nations Observer Mission in Georgia
1753	27 April 2007	15–0–0	Lifts ban on imports of diamonds from Liberia
1754	30 April 2007	15–0–0	Extends mandate of the United Nations Mission for the Referendum in Western Sahara
1755	30 April 2007	15–0–0	Extends mandate of the United Nations Mission in Sudan
1756	15 May 2007	15–0–0	Extends mandate of the United Nations Organisation Mission in the Democratic Republic of the Congo
1757	30 May 2007	10–0–5 (abstentions: China, Indonesia, Qatar, Russia, South Africa)	Establishes the Special Tribunal for Lebanon for prosecuting those responsible for the assassination of Rafic Hariri
1758	15 June 2007	15–0–0	Extends mandate of the United Nations Peacekeeping Force in Cyprus
1759	20 June 2007	15–0–0	Renews mandate of the United Nations Disengagement Observer Force
1760	20 June 2007	15–0–0	Re-establishes expert panel monitoring diamond and timber sanctions against Liberia
1761	20 June 2007	15–0–0	Extends mandate of expert panel monitoring arms and diamonds sanctions against Côte d'Ivoire
1762	29 June 2007	14–0–1 (abstention: Russia)	Terminates the United Nations Monitoring, Verification and Inspection Commission in Iraq
1763	29 June 2007	15–0–0	Extends mandate of the United Nations Operation in Côte d'Ivoire and French forces
1764	29 June 2007	15–0–0	Appoints Miroslav Lajčák as High Representative for Bosnia and Herzegovina
1765	16 July 2007	15–0–0	Extends mandate of the United Nations Operation in Côte d'Ivoire and French forces
1766	23 July 2007	15–0–0	Extends mandate of expert group monitoring arms embargo against Somalia
1767	30 July 2007	15–0–0	Extends mandate of the United Nations Mission in Ethiopia and Eritrea
1768	31 July 2007	15–0–0	Extends arms embargo against the Democratic Republic of the Congo
1769	31 July 2007	15–0–0	Authorises deployment of the African Union – United Nations Hybrid Operation in Darfur
1770	10 August 2007	15–0–0	Extends mandate of the United Nations Assistance Mission in Iraq
1771	10 August 2007	15–0–0	Renews arms embargo against the Democratic Republic of the Congo
1772	20 August 2007	15–0–0	Authorises continuation of the African Union Mission to Somalia
1773	24 August 2007	15–0–0	Extends mandate of the United Nations Interim Force in Lebanon
1774	14 September 2007	15–0–0	Re-appoints Hassan Bubacar Jallow as Prosecutor of the International Criminal Tribunal for Rwanda
1775	14 September 2007	14–0–1 (abstention: Russia)	Extends appointment of Carla Del Ponte as Prosecutor of the International Criminal Tribunal for the former Yugoslavia
1776	19 September 2007	14–0–1 (abstention: Russia)	Extends authorisation of the International Security Assistance Force in Afghanistan
1777	20 September 2007	15–0–0	Extends mandate of the United Nations Mission in Liberia
1778	25 September 2007	15–0–0	Establishes the United Nations Mission in the Central African Republic and Chad
1779	28 September 2007	15–0–0	Extends mandate of expert panel monitoring sanctions against Darfur, Sudan
1780	15 October 2007	15–0–0	Extends mandate of the United Nations Stabilisation Mission in Haiti
1781	15 October 2007	15–0–0	Extends mandate of the United Nations Observer Mission in Georgia
1782	29 October 2007	15–0–0	Renews sanctions against Côte d'Ivoire
1783	31 October 2007	15–0–0	Extends mandate of the United Nations Mission for the Referendum in Western Sahara
1784	31 October 2007	15–0–0	Extends mandate of the United Nations Mission in Sudan
1785	21 November 2007	15–0–0	Extends mandate of EUFOR Althea in Bosnia and Herzegovina
1786	28 November 2007	15–0–0	Appoints Serge Brammertz as Prosecutor of the International Criminal Tribunal for the former Yugoslavia
1787	10 December 2007	15–0–0	Extends period of the Counter-Terrorism Committee Executive Directorate
1788	14 December 2007	15–0–0	Renews mandate of the United Nations Disengagement Observer Force
1789	14 December 2007	15–0–0	Extends mandate of the United Nations Peacekeeping Force in Cyprus
1790	18 December 2007	15–0–0	Extends mandate of the United Nations Assistance Mission in Iraq
1791	19 December 2007	15–0–0	Extends mandate of the United Nations Integrated Office in Burundi
1792	19 December 2007	15–0–0	Prolongs arms and travel bans against Liberia
1793	21 December 2007	15–0–0	Extends mandate of the United Nations Integrated Office in Sierra Leone
1794	21 December 2007	15–0–0	Extends mandate of the United Nations Organisation Mission in the Democratic Republic of the Congo
1795	15 January 2008	15–0–0	Extends mandate of the United Nations Operation in Côte d'Ivoire and French forces
1796	23 January 2008	15–0–0	Extends mandate of the United Nations Mission in Nepal
1797	30 January 2008	15–0–0	Authorises the United Nations Organisation Mission in the Democratic Republic of the Congo to organise and conduct local elections
1798	30 January 2008	15–0–0	Extends mandate of the United Nations Mission in Ethiopia and Eritrea
1799	15 February 2008	15–0–0	Renews sanctions against the Democratic Republic of the Congo
1800	20 February 2008	15–0–0	Appointment of temporary judges at the International Criminal Tribunal for the former Yugoslavia

== See also ==
- Lists of United Nations Security Council resolutions
- List of United Nations Security Council Resolutions 1601 to 1700
- List of United Nations Security Council Resolutions 1801 to 1900
