= United Nations Security Council Resolution 1799 =

UN Security Council Resolution 1799
- UN flag
- Date: 15 February 2008
- Meeting no.: 5,836
- Code: S/RES/1799 (Document)
- Subject: The situation concerning the Democratic Republic of the Congo
- Voting summary: 15 voted for; None voted against; None abstained
- Result: Adopted

Security Council composition
- Permanent members: China; France; Russia; United Kingdom; United States
- Non-permanent members: Burkina Faso; Belgium; Costa Rica; Croatia; Indonesia; Italy; Libya; Panama; South Africa; Vietnam

United Nations Security Council Resolution 1799 was unanimously adopted on 15 February 2008.

== Resolution ==
Determining that the situation in the Democratic Republic of the Congo continued to constitute a threat to international peace and security in the region, the Security Council decided this morning to extend the sanctions regime for that country, due to expire today, until 31 March.

Unanimously adopting resolution 1799 (2008) and acting under Chapter VII of the United Nations Charter, the Council also extended until the same date the mandate of the Group of Experts monitoring the measures, as set out in resolution 1771 (2007).

The sanctions regime consists of an arms embargo against armed groups in the country that are not part of the integrated army or police units, as well as a travel ban and assets freeze on those violating the embargo, as determined in resolutions 1493 (2003), 1596 (2005), 1698 (2006) and 1771 (2007).

During the period until 31 March, the Council will continue reviewing the measures with a view to adjusting them, as appropriate, in the light of consolidation of the security situation in the country. The Council reiterated its serious concern, however, regarding the presence of armed groups and militias in the eastern part of the country, particularly in the provinces of North and South Kivu and the Ituri district, which perpetuated a climate of insecurity in the whole region.

== See also ==
- List of United Nations Security Council Resolutions 1701 to 1800 (2006–2008)
