= United Nations Security Council Resolution 1787 =

UN Security Council Resolution 1787
- Date: 10 December 2007
- Meeting no.: 5,795
- Code: S/RES/1787 (Document)
- Subject: Threats to international peace and security caused by terrorist acts
- Voting summary: 15 voted for; None voted against; None abstained
- Result: Adopted

Security Council composition
- Permanent members: China; France; Russia; United Kingdom; United States
- Non-permanent members: Belgium; Rep. of the Congo; Ghana; Indonesia; Italy; Panama; Peru; Qatar; Slovakia; South Africa

United Nations Security Council Resolution 1787 was unanimously adopted on 10 December 2007.

== Resolution ==
The Security Council decided this morning to extend the initial period of the Counter-Terrorism Committee Executive Directorate (CTED) until 31 March 2008.

Unanimously adopting resolution 1787 (2007), the Council requested the Executive Director of CTED to recommend, within 60 days, such changes as he deemed appropriate to the organizational plan and to submit them to the Counter-Terrorism Committee for its consideration and endorsement prior to 31 March 2008.

CTED was established by resolution 1535 (2004) as a special political mission under the policy guidance of the Council plenary.

Following this morning’s unanimous vote, the representative of Qatar said his delegation had voted in favour of the resolution, even though some of its observations had not been reflected in the text. The Council had been dealing with terrorism without a clear definition of the term and having failed to deal with the root causes of the phenomenon. Qatar urged it to find a clear definition of the phenomenon and its root causes.

There was also a lack of coordination, he said, noting that some 24 bodies within the Secretariat dealt with terrorism. There was a clear lack of accuracy in the evaluation of Member States’ efforts to implement the resolution and an imbalance in the number of visits to countries of the South compared to countries of the North. Moreover, the Committee and the Directorate had not done enough to implement resolution 1624 (2005), which focused on incitement to terrorism and the importance of not distorting religious or cultural symbols.

The representative of Panama said the decision taken today was justified because of the recent appointment of Mike Smith, the new Director.

== See also ==
- List of United Nations Security Council Resolutions 1701 to 1800 (2006–2008)
