= United Nations Security Council Resolution 1753 =

UN Security Council Resolution 1753
- Date: 27 April 2007
- Meeting no.: 5,668
- Code: S/RES/1753 (Document)
- Subject: The situation in Liberia
- Voting summary: 15 voted for; None voted against; None abstained
- Result: Adopted

Security Council composition
- Permanent members: China; France; Russia; United Kingdom; United States
- Non-permanent members: Belgium; Rep. of the Congo; Ghana; Indonesia; Italy; Panama; Peru; Qatar; Slovakia; South Africa

United Nations Security Council Resolution 1753 was unanimously adopted on 27 April 2007.

== Resolution ==
The Security Council today lifted a more than three-year-old ban on diamond imports from Liberia, applauding the Government’s cooperation with the “Kimberley Process”, a mechanism set up to keep so-called “blood diamonds” from reaching world markets.

Unanimously adopting resolution 1753 (2007) and acting under Chapter VII of the Charter of the United Nations, the Council terminated the measures on diamonds imposed in resolution 1521 (2003), by which all States should prevent the direct or indirect import of all rough diamonds from Liberia to their territory, whether or not such diamonds originated in that country (see Press Release SC/7965 of 22 December 2003).

According to today’s text, the termination would be reviewed in 90 days, after consideration of the report of the United Nations Panel of Experts on the matter and a report of the “Kimberley Process” on Liberia’s application of its proposed Certificate of Origin regime.

The United Nations-backed Kimberley Process Certification Scheme of 2000 was designed to protect the legitimate diamond industry by stopping the marketing of “conflict diamonds” or “blood diamonds”—the rough gems traded by rebels or their allies to finance violence. The initiative now governs diamond production and importation in 70 countries.

Trafficking in illegal diamonds is considered one of the root causes of the back-to-back civil wars in Liberia since 1989, as well as of the 10-year brutal conflict in neighbouring Sierra Leone that ended in 2001. Blood diamonds has also been blamed for financing wars in other African countries, including Angola, Côte d’Ivoire and the Democratic Republic of the Congo.

== See also ==
- List of United Nations Security Council Resolutions 1701 to 1800 (2006–2008)
