= United Nations Security Council Resolution 1732 =

UN Security Council Resolution 1732
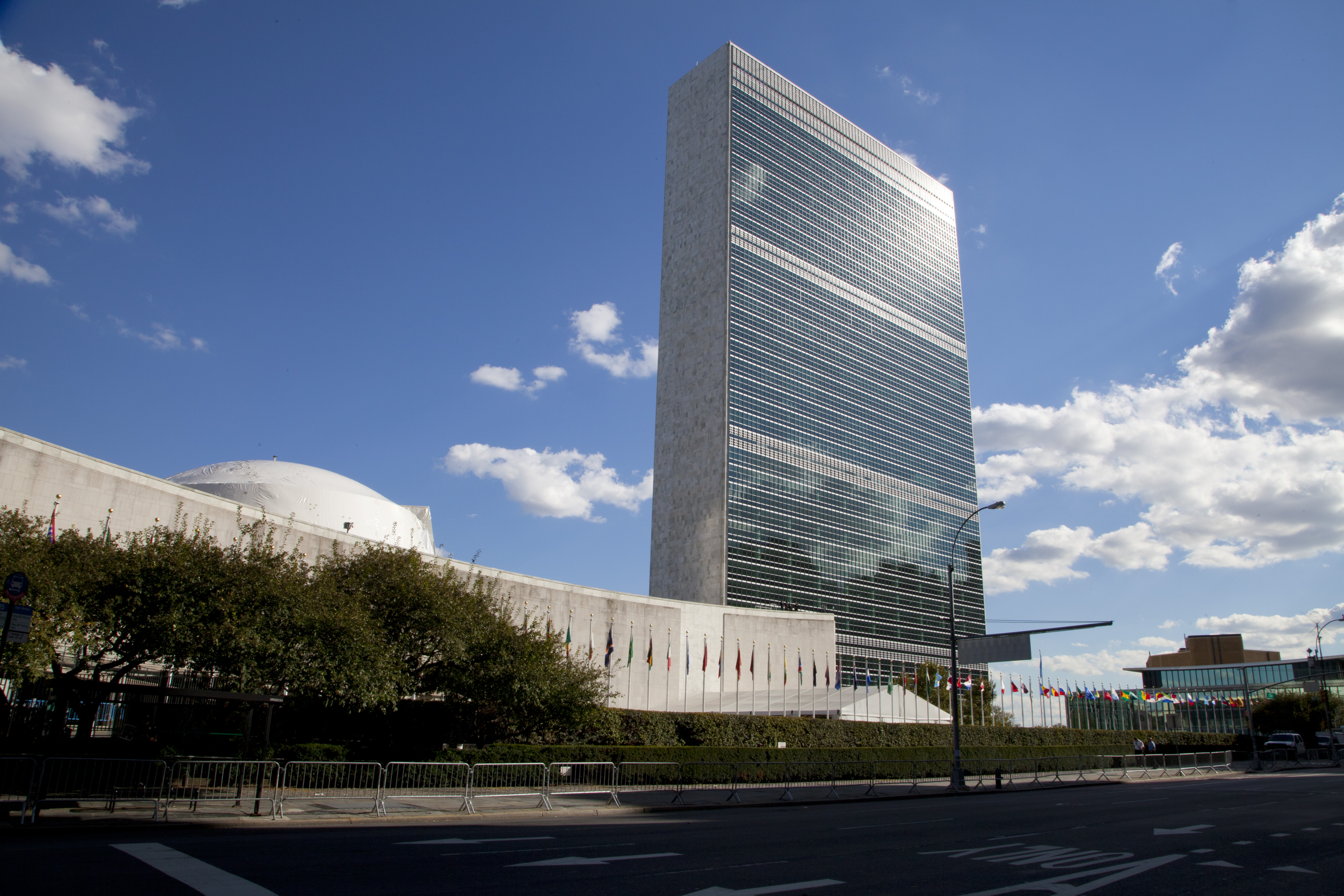
- United Nations Headquarters
- Date: 21 December 2006
- Meeting no.: 5,605
- Code: S/RES/1732 (Document)
- Subject: General issues relating to sanctions
- Voting summary: 15 voted for; None voted against; None abstained
- Result: Adopted

Security Council composition
- Permanent members: China; France; Russia; United Kingdom; United States
- Non-permanent members: Argentina; Rep. of the Congo; Denmark; Ghana; Greece; Japan; Peru; Qatar; Slovakia; Tanzania

United Nations Security Council Resolution 1732, adopted unanimously on December 21, 2006, after welcoming a report by a working group established by the Security Council, the Council took note of its findings and decided that it had fulfilled its mandate.

== Details ==
The mandate of the working group was to make recommendations on how to improve the effectiveness of United Nations sanctions. It was also tasked with addressing unintended consequences of sanctions, the enforcement of sanctions and de-listing procedures. Subsidiary bodies were requested to take note of the findings of the working group.

== See also ==
- List of United Nations Security Council Resolutions 1701 to 1800 (2006–2008)
