= United Nations Security Council Resolution 1752 =

UN Security Council Resolution 1752
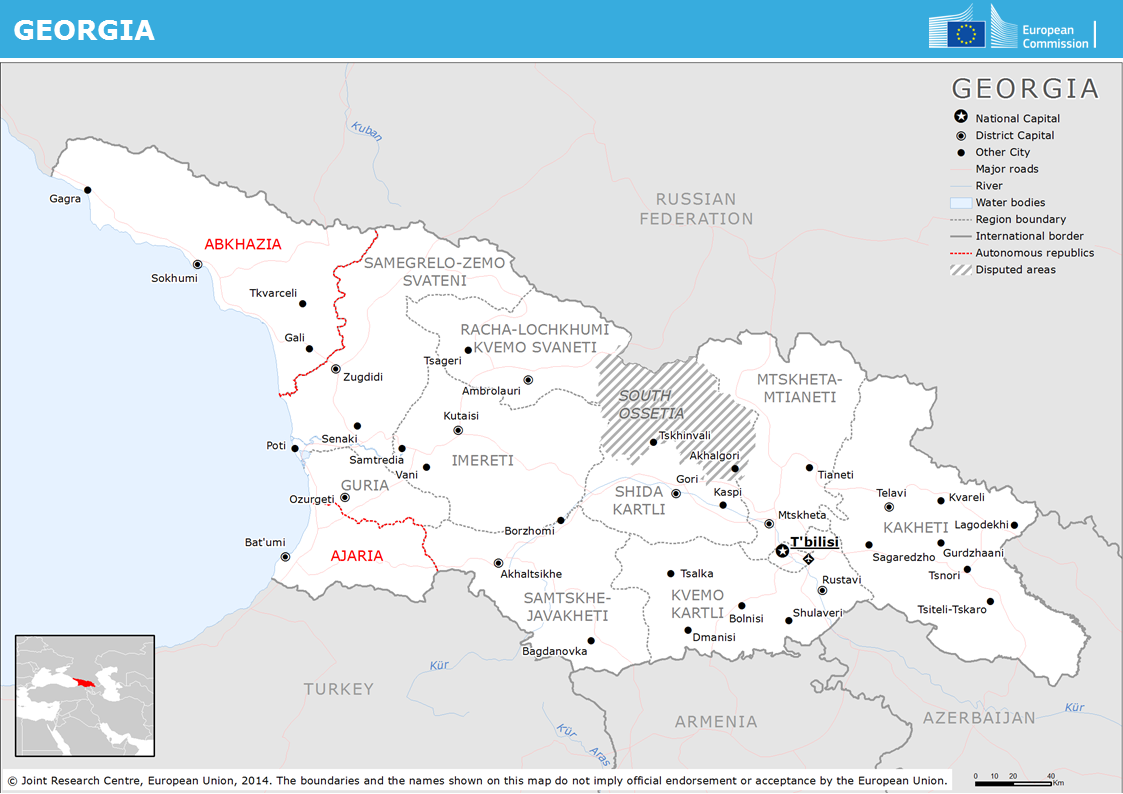
- Map of Georgia
- Date: 13 April 2007
- Meeting no.: 5,661
- Code: S/RES/1752 (Document)
- Subject: The situation in Georgia
- Voting summary: 15 voted for; None voted against; None abstained
- Result: Adopted

Security Council composition
- Permanent members: China; France; Russia; United Kingdom; United States
- Non-permanent members: Belgium; Rep. of the Congo; Ghana; Indonesia; Italy; Panama; Peru; Qatar; Slovakia; South Africa

United Nations Security Council Resolution 1752 was unanimously adopted on 13 April 2007.

== Resolution ==
Unanimously adopting resolution 1752 (2007), the Council, welcoming progress achieved by both sides towards the implementation of resolution 1716 (2006), called on the Georgian side to ensure that the situation in the upper Kodori Valley was in line with the Moscow agreement on ceasefire and separation of forces of 14 May 1994. It called on the Abkhaz side to exercise restraint in connection with the Georgian commitments with regard to the Kodori valley.

The Council condemned the attack on villages in the upper Kodori valley carried out in the night of 11 and 12 March, and urged all sides to extend full support to the ongoing investigation conducted by the joint fact finding group under leadership of UNOMIG.

Stressing that the situation on the ground in the areas of security, return of internally displaced persons, rehabilitation and development must be improved, the Council called on both sides to resume dialogue without preconditions in those areas. It urged the sides to address seriously each other’s legitimate security concerns, to refrain from any actions that might impede the peace process and to extend the necessary cooperation to UNOMIG and the Commonwealth of Independent States (CIS) peacekeeping force.

The Council further urged both parties to immediately engage in implementing, without preconditions, confidence-building measures contained in the proposals presented by the Group of Friends of the Secretary-General during the meeting held in Geneva on 12 and 13 February, under participation of the Georgian and Abkhaz parties.

== See also ==
- List of United Nations Security Council Resolutions 1701 to 1800 (2006–2008)
