= United Nations Security Council Resolution 1736 =

UN Security Council Resolution 1736
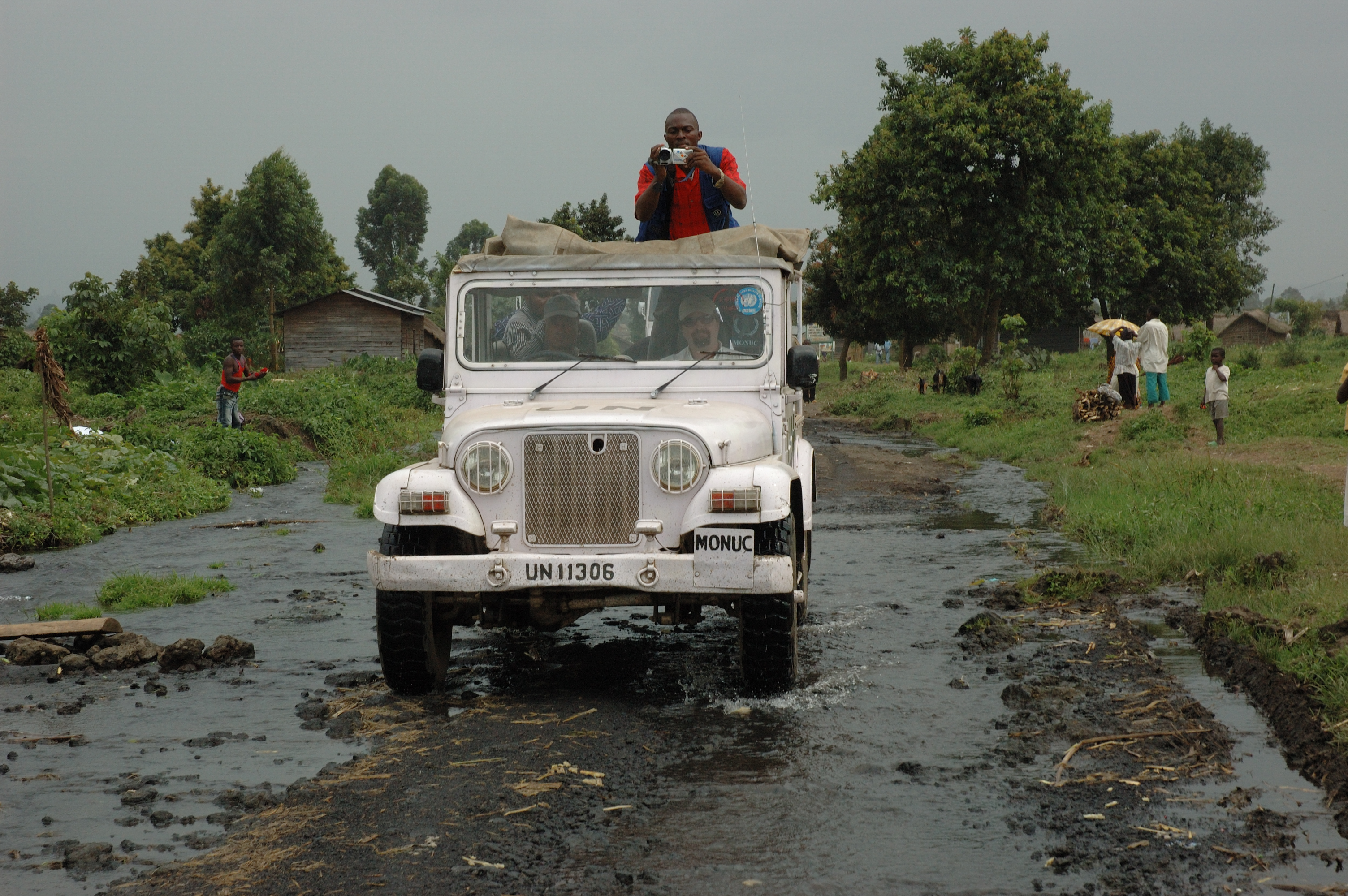
- MONUC jeep
- Date: 22 December 2006
- Meeting no.: 5,610
- Code: S/RES/1736 (Document)
- Subject: The situation concerning the Democratic Republic of the Congo
- Voting summary: 15 voted for; None voted against; None abstained
- Result: Adopted

Security Council composition
- Permanent members: China; France; Russia; United Kingdom; United States
- Non-permanent members: Argentina; Rep. of the Congo; Denmark; Ghana; Greece; Japan; Peru; Qatar; Slovakia; Tanzania

United Nations Security Council Resolution 1736, adopted unanimously on December 22, 2006, after recalling all previous resolutions concerning the situation in the Democratic Republic of the Congo, in Burundi and in the Great Lakes region of Africa, the Council increased the military strength of the United Nations Mission in the Democratic Republic of Congo (MONUC) from January 1, 2007 to February 15, 2007.

== Resolution ==
=== Observations ===
The Council again praised the people of the Democratic Republic of the Congo for their commitment towards the democratic process. It noted that 50 military observers temporarily re-deployed from the United Nations Operation in Burundi (ONUB) in accordance with resolutions 1669 (2006) and 1692 (2006) had successfully completed their mission and would be repatriated by December 31, 2006.

As with previous resolutions, Resolution 1736 condemned hostilities in the east of the country carried out by militias and foreign armed groups and further criticised violations of international humanitarian law and human rights, particularly those carried out by the militias, foreign armed groups and elements of the armed forces. In this regard, Council members called on those responsible to be brought to justice.

The Council was aware that the mandates of ONUB and MONUC would end on December 31, 2006 and February 15, 2007 respectively, and anticipated a review of MONUC by the Secretary-General.

=== Acts ===
Using Chapter VII powers, the Security Council authorised a temporary increase of 916 military personnel in MONUC from January 1, 2007 to February 15, 2007. At the same time, the temporary deployment of one infantry battalion and a military hospital from ONUB was also extended. It reaffirmed its intention to review the issue pending a report from the Secretary-General.

== See also ==
- Kivu conflict
- Ituri conflict
- List of United Nations Security Council Resolutions 1701 to 1800 (2006–2008)
- Second Congo War
