= United Nations Security Council Resolution 1771 =

UN Security Council Resolution 1771
- Date: 10 August 2007
- Meeting no.: 5,730
- Code: S/RES/1771 (Document)
- Subject: The situation concerning the Democratic Republic of the Congo
- Voting summary: 15 voted for; None voted against; None abstained
- Result: Adopted

Security Council composition
- Permanent members: China; France; Russia; United Kingdom; United States
- Non-permanent members: Belgium; Rep. of the Congo; Ghana; Indonesia; Italy; Panama; Peru; Qatar; Slovakia; South Africa

United Nations Security Council Resolution 1771 was unanimously adopted on 10 August 2007.

== Resolution ==
The Security Council, condemning the continuing illicit flow of weapons within and into the Democratic Republic of the Congo, and reiterating its serious concern regarding the presence of armed groups and militias in the Eastern part of the country, today decided to renew the arms embargo on the country, and the travel ban and assets freeze on those in violation of it, until 15 February 2008.

Unanimously adopting resolution 1771 (2007) following a 10-day technical extension of the sanctions on 31 July, the Council, acting under Chapter VII of the Charter, decided that the arms embargo, which it first imposed by resolution 1493 in July 2003 and expanded by resolution 1596 in April 2005, should not apply to technical training and assistance agreed to by the Government and intended solely for army and police support units that were in the process of their integration in the provinces of North and South Kivu and the Ituri district.

By further terms of the text, the Council recalled that the embargo should not apply to supplies of arms and related materiel or technical training and assistance intended solely for support of and use by the country's army and police units, provided that the units had completed the integration process, operated under the command, respectively, of the état-major intégré of the country's Armed Forces or National Police, and were in the process of their integration in the country's territory outside the provinces of North and South Kivu and the Ituri district.

The Council also requested the Secretary-General to re-establish for a period expiring on 15 February 2008 the Group of Experts created to help monitor illicit arms flows into the country.

== See also ==
- List of United Nations Security Council Resolutions 1701 to 1800 (2006–2008)
