= United Nations Security Council Resolution 1779 =

UN Security Council Resolution 1779
- Date: 28 September 2007
- Meeting no.: 5,750
- Code: S/RES/1779 (Document)
- Subject: Reports of the Secretary-General on the Sudan
- Voting summary: 15 voted for; None voted against; None abstained
- Result: Adopted

Security Council composition
- Permanent members: China; France; Russia; United Kingdom; United States
- Non-permanent members: Belgium; Rep. of the Congo; Ghana; Indonesia; Italy; Panama; Peru; Qatar; Slovakia; South Africa

United Nations Security Council Resolution 1779 was unanimously adopted on 28 September 2007.

== Resolution ==
Noting with strong concern the deteriorating humanitarian situation in the strife-torn Darfur region of the Sudan, the Security Council today extended for one year the mandate of the Panel of Experts appointed to monitor the arms embargo there.

Acting under Chapter VII of the United Nations Charter, the Council, unanimously adopted resolution 1779 (2007), deciding to extend until 15 October 2008 the mandate of the four-member Panel originally appointed pursuant to resolution 1591 (2005).

The Council also requested the Panel to issue a midterm briefing on its work by 29 March 2008, a separate interim report in 90 days’ time, and a final report no later than 30 days prior to the termination of its mandate.

According to the original resolution, the Council decided that all States would take the necessary measures to prevent the sale or supply of weapons and military equipment to belligerents in the Darfur conflict, in which at least 400,000 people have been killed and some 2 million displaced since fighting broke out in early 2003, pitting rebels against the Sudanese Government and its allied militias.

== See also ==
- List of United Nations Security Council Resolutions 1701 to 1800 (2006–2008)
