= United Nations Security Council Resolution 1756 =

UN Security Council Resolution 1756
- Date: 15 May 2007
- Meeting no.: 5,674
- Code: S/RES/1745 (Document)
- Subject: The situation concerning the Democratic Republic of the Congo
- Voting summary: 15 voted for; None voted against; None abstained
- Result: Adopted

Security Council composition
- Permanent members: China; France; Russia; United Kingdom; United States
- Non-permanent members: Belgium; Rep. of the Congo; Ghana; Indonesia; Italy; Panama; Peru; Qatar; Slovakia; South Africa

United Nations Security Council Resolution 1756 was unanimously adopted on 15 May 2007.

== Resolution ==
Acting under Chapter VII of the United Nations Charter, the Security Council decided this morning to extend the deployment of the United Nations Organization Mission in the Democratic Republic of the Congo (MONUC) until 31 December 2007, and authorized the continuation until that date of up to 17,030 military personnel, 760 military observers, 391 police trainers and 750 personnel of formed police units.

Unanimously adopting resolution 1756 (2007), the Council also decided that MONUC would have the mandate to help the Government of the Democratic Republic of the Congo establish a stable security environment in the country.

To that end, the Mission would ensure the protection of civilians, including humanitarian personnel, under imminent threat of physical violence; contribute to the improvement of the security conditions in which humanitarian assistance was provided, and assist in the voluntary return of refugees and internally displaced persons; ensure the protection of United Nations personnel, facilities, installations and equipment; ensure the security and freedom of movement of United Nations and associated personnel; and carry out joint patrols with riot control units of the national police to improve security in the event of civil disturbance.

With regard to the country’s territorial security, the Council mandated the Mission to, among other things, observe and report in a timely manner on the position of armed movements and groups and the presence of foreign military forces in the key areas of volatility, especially by monitoring the use of landing strips and the borders, including on the lakes.

As for the disarmament and demobilization of foreign and Congolese armed groups, MONUC would deter any attempt at the use of force by any foreign or Congolese armed group to threaten the political process, particularly in the country’s eastern part. The Mission would support operations led by the Congolese Armed Forces in that part of the country with a view to disarming recalcitrant local and foreign armed groups to ensure their participation in the disarmament, demobilization and reintegration process and the release of children associated with them; and preventing the provision of support to illegal armed groups, including that derived from illicit economic activities.

With respect to security sector reform, the Council mandated MONUC to provide short-term basic training, including in the area of human rights, international humanitarian law, child protection and the prevention of gender-based violence, to the Congolese Armed Forces in the eastern Democratic Republic of the Congo; continue to develop, in coordination with international partners, the capacities of the Congolese national police and related law enforcement agencies in accordance with internationally recognized standards and norms on human rights, proportionate use of force and criminal justice, including the prevention, investigation and prosecution of gender-based violence cases; and advise the Government on strengthening the capacity of the judicial and correctional systems, including the military justice system.

== See also ==
- List of United Nations Security Council Resolutions 1701 to 1800 (2006–2008)
