= United Nations Security Council Resolution 1798 =

UN Security Council Resolution 1798
- UN flag
- Date: 30 January 2008
- Meeting no.: 5,829
- Code: S/RES/1798 (Document)
- Subject: The situation between Eritrea and Ethiopia
- Voting summary: lll voted for; None voted against; None abstained
- Result: Adopted

Security Council composition
- Permanent members: China; France; Russia; United Kingdom; United States
- Non-permanent members: Burkina Faso; Belgium; Costa Rica; Croatia; Indonesia; Italy; Libya; Panama; South Africa; Vietnam

United Nations Security Council Resolution 1798 was unanimously adopted on 30 January 2008.

== Resolution ==
Expressing its deep concern about the continuing dispute between Ethiopia and Eritrea and the tense security situation in the Temporary Security Zone and adjacent areas, the Security Council extended the mandate of the United Nations Mission in Ethiopia and Eritrea (UNMEE) for a period of six months, until 31 July 2008.

Unanimously adopting resolution 1798 (2008), the Council called upon the parties to show maximum restraint and refrain from any threat or use of force against each other, avoid provocative military activities, and put an end to the exchange of hostile statements. It also demanded that the two countries immediately take concrete steps to complete the process launched by the Peace Agreement of 12 December 2000 by enabling physical demarcation of the border.

Also, by the text, the Council reiterated its demands that Eritrea withdraw immediately all troops and heavy military equipment from the Temporary Security Zone, to provide UNMEE with the necessary access, assistance, support and protection required for the performance of its duties, and to remove restrictions on the Mission immediately and without preconditions. It noted with grave concern the Mission's critical fuel levels and demanded that the Government of Eritrea immediately resume fuel shipments to UNMEE or allow it to import fuel without restrictions.

At the same time, the Council called upon Ethiopia to reduce the number of military forces in the areas adjacent to the Temporary Security Zone. It reiterated its call on both parties to cooperate fully with UNMEE with a view to urgently reactivating the work of the Military Coordination Commission, which remained a unique forum to discuss pressing military and security issues.

The Council strongly supported ongoing efforts by the Secretary-General and the international community to engage with Eritrea and Ethiopia to help them normalize relations, promote stability and lay the foundation for a comprehensive and lasting settlement of the dispute. It urged the parties to accept the Secretary-General's good offices.

As it considered the situation between Ethiopia and Eritrea, the Council had before it the Secretary-General's latest report on the matter (document S/2008/40), which describes the tense military situation in the Temporary Security Zone during the period leading up to the Eritrea-Ethiopia Boundary Commission's 30 November 2007 deadline for demarcation of the boundary. Both countries continued to reinforce their military deployments in the border area and the Eritrean Defence Forces continued to induct troops into the Zone. The Ethiopian Armed Forces conducted training exercises and advanced some 2,300 additional troops deeper into the border areas in Sector West.

According to the report, the Secretary-General encourages the parties to resume the meetings of the Military Coordination Commission and to cooperate in promoting confidence-building measures such as demining and facilitating the provision of humanitarian assistance.

== See also ==
- List of United Nations Security Council Resolutions 1701 to 1800 (2006–2008)
