= United Nations Security Council Resolution 1795 =

UN Security Council Resolution 1795
- Date: 15 January 2008
- Meeting no.: 5,820
- Code: S/RES/1795 (Document)
- Subject: The situation in Côte d'Ivoire
- Voting summary: 15 voted for; None voted against; None abstained
- Result: Adopted

Security Council composition
- Permanent members: China; France; Russia; United Kingdom; United States
- Non-permanent members: Burkina Faso; Belgium; Costa Rica; Croatia; Indonesia; Italy; Libya; Panama; South Africa; Vietnam

United Nations Security Council Resolution 1795 was unanimously adopted on 15 January 2008.

== Resolution ==
The Security Council today extended until 30 July 2008 the mandates of the United Nations Operation in Côte d'Ivoire (UNOCI) and the French forces backing it, in order to support the West African country’s efforts to organize free and fair elections.

Acting under Chapter VII of the United Nations Charter, the Council unanimously adopted resolution 1795 (2008), which extended the mission to assist the Ivorian parties in implementing the Supplementary Agreements recently signed by President Laurent Gbagbo and Prime Minister Guillaume Soro, setting out new timelines for the completion of tasks outstanding under the Ouagadougou Agreement, including the holding of presidential elections by June 2008.

The Council called on the Ivorian parties to implement the Supplementary Agreements and the Ouagadougou political accord “fully, in good faith and within the amended time frame set out in these Agreements, which will require the Ivorian parties to redouble their efforts, and encourages the international community to bring continued support to this effect”.

The Ouagadougou Agreement, struck in the capital of neighbouring Burkina Faso last March, details a series of measures to deal with the crisis that first divided Côte d'Ivoire in 2002 between the Government-controlled south and the north, held by the rebel Forces nouvelles. Those measures included the creation of a new transitional Government; merging the Forces nouvelles and the national defence and security forces through the establishment of an integrated command centre; and replacing the so-called zone of confidence separating north and south with a “green line”, to be monitored by UNOCI.

Today’s resolution expressed the Council’s intention to review by 30 July 2008 the mandates of UNOCI and the French forces, as well as the level of UNOCI troops, “in light of the progress achieved in the implementation of the key steps of the peace process”. It requested Secretary-General Ban Ki-moon to provide the Council with a report on those key steps three weeks before the review deadline date.

The Council also requested the Secretary-General to keep it regularly informed, particularly about the preparations of the electoral process, including the registration of voters, and to provide a report in that regard no later than 15 April 2008. It also welcomed the establishment by UNOCI of a certification support cell to assist the Special Representative in fulfilling that task.

== See also ==
- List of United Nations Security Council Resolutions 1701 to 1800 (2006–2008)
