= United Nations Security Council Resolution 1760 =

UN Security Council Resolution 1760
- Date: 20 June 2007
- Meeting no.: 5,699
- Code: S/RES/1760 (Document)
- Subject: The situation in Liberia
- Voting summary: 15 voted for; None voted against; None abstained
- Result: Adopted

Security Council composition
- Permanent members: China; France; Russia; United Kingdom; United States
- Non-permanent members: Belgium; Rep. of the Congo; Ghana; Indonesia; Italy; Panama; Peru; Qatar; Slovakia; South Africa

United Nations Security Council Resolution 1760 was unanimously adopted on 20 June 2007.

== Resolution ==
The United Nations Security Council today requested Secretary-General Ban Ki-moon to renew a panel of financial experts and specialists in the timber and diamond trades to continue investigating violations of Council sanctions against Liberia, following reports that former Liberian President Charles Taylor, now in The Hague awaiting trial for war crimes, may still have access to considerable wealth.

Acting under Chapter VII of the United Nations Charter, the Council unanimously adopted resolution 1760 (2007), asking the Secretary-General to establish, within one month, a three-member Panel of Experts to conduct a follow-up assessment mission to Liberia and neighbouring States, in order to, among other things, investigate and compile a report on the implementation and any violations of the measures outlined in resolution 1521 (2003).

That resolution calls for the creation of a similarly mandated Panel and imposes a travel ban on Mr. Taylor’s inner circle, as well as any other individuals “posing a threat to the stability and security in Liberia and the subregion”. Today’s Council action followed a closed-door meeting held last week to consider the report of the previous Expert Panel, whose mandate expires today. The Panel, which conducted assessments in West Africa and elsewhere between February and June, discovered that Mr. Taylor may have substantial hidden assets in Liberia and Nigeria, and that he retained ties to a large Liberian cell phone company.

Resolution 1760 (2007) sets out the specific objectives for the new Panel’s assessment mission, including a further investigation of implementation and violations of Council resolution 1532 (2004), which calls on all Member States to freeze financial assets and economic resources owned or controlled by Mr. Taylor, his wife Jewell Howard Taylor, his son Charles Taylor Junior, and other associates, in order to prevent them from “using misappropriated funds and property to interfere in the restoration of peace in Liberia and the subregion”.

The Panel is expected to assess the implementation of forestry legislation passed by the Liberian Congress and signed into law last October by President Ellen Johnson Sirleaf, and to gauge the Government’s compliance with the Kimberley Process Certification Scheme, a mechanism established to keep “blood diamonds” from reaching world markets. The experts are required to report back to the Council through its “1521 Committee”, which monitors the United Nations sanctions regime on Liberia, by 6 December 2007 and to provide informal updates as appropriate before that date.

== See also ==
- List of United Nations Security Council Resolutions 1701 to 1800 (2006–2008)
