= United Nations Security Council Resolution 1782 =

UN Security Council Resolution 1782
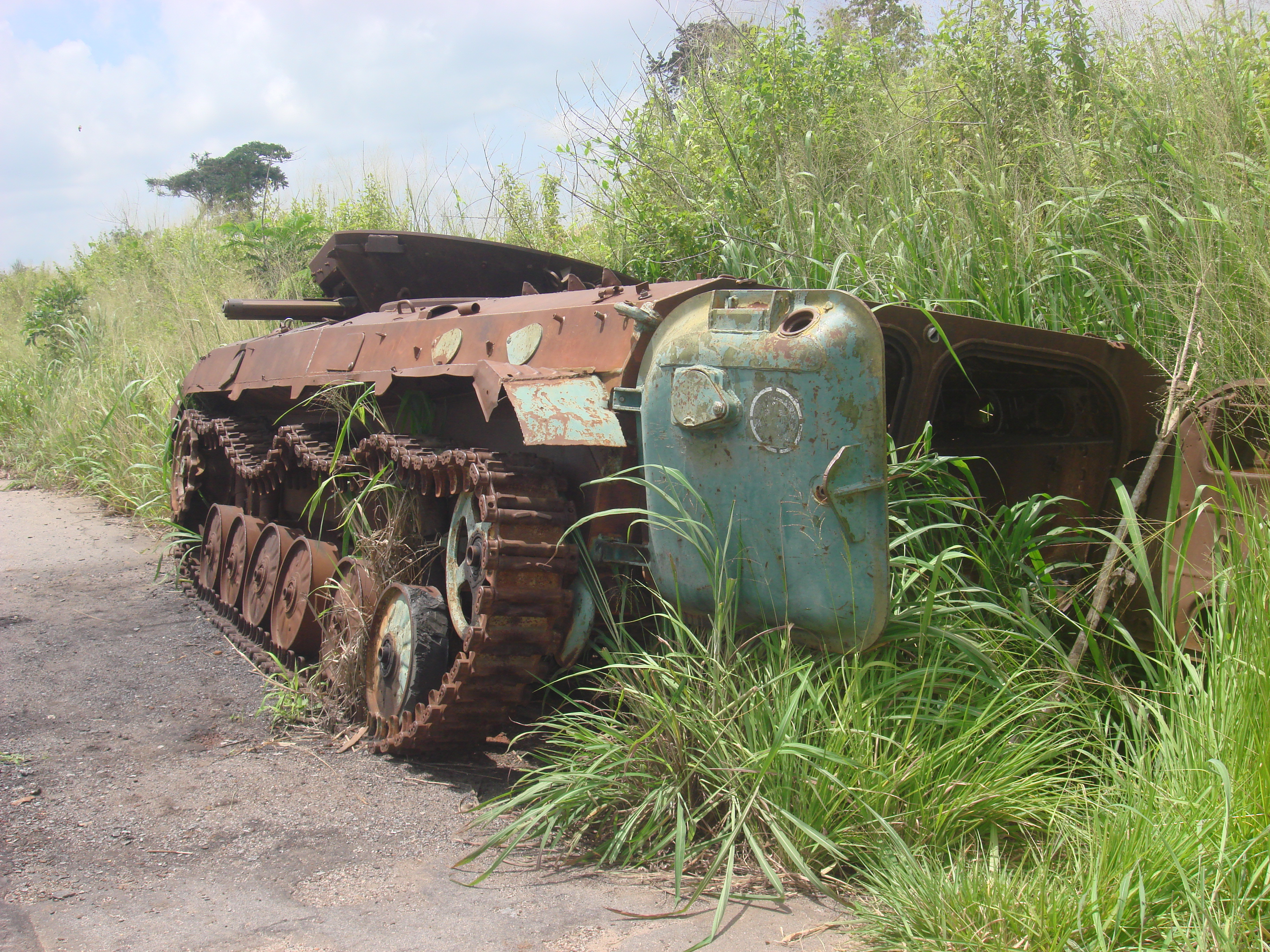
- Remains of a National Armed Forces of Côte d'Ivoire tank
- Date: 29 October 2007
- Meeting no.: 5,772
- Code: S/RES/1782 (Document)
- Subject: The situation in Côte d'Ivoire
- Voting summary: 15 voted for; None voted against; None abstained
- Result: Adopted

Security Council composition
- Permanent members: China; France; Russia; United Kingdom; United States
- Non-permanent members: Belgium; Rep. of the Congo; Ghana; Indonesia; Italy; Panama; Peru; Qatar; Slovakia; South Africa

United Nations Security Council Resolution 1782 was unanimously adopted on 29 October 2007.

== Resolution ==
Determining that the situation in Côte d'Ivoire continued to pose a threat to international peace and security in the region, the Security Council today renewed until 31 October 2008 the arms and rough diamond bans it had imposed on the country, as well as targeted measures, such as travel restrictions and the freezing of funds, against certain individuals.

Unanimously adopting resolution 1782 (2007) – which was submitted by France – and acting under Chapter VII of the United Nations Charter, the Council also extended the mandate of the Group of Experts it had created to monitor the sanctions and to administer the list of individuals subject to travel and financial measures, as set out in resolutions 1572 (2004) and 1643 (2005).

By further terms, the Council would review the renewed measures in light of progress achieved in implementation of the key steps of the peace process as referred to in resolution 1765 (2007) of 16 July. The Council would carry out an interim review once the parties had fully implemented the Ouagadougou political Agreement and after the holding of open, free, fair and transparent presidential and legislative elections, but no later than 30 April 2008.

== See also ==
- List of United Nations Security Council Resolutions 1701 to 1800 (2006–2008)
