= United Nations Security Council Resolution 1761 =

UN Security Council Resolution 1761
- Date: 20 June 2007
- Meeting no.: 5,700
- Code: S/RES/1761 (Document)
- Subject: The situation in Côte d’Ivoire
- Voting summary: 15 voted for; None voted against; None abstained
- Result: Adopted

Security Council composition
- Permanent members: China; France; Russia; United Kingdom; United States
- Non-permanent members: Belgium; Rep. of the Congo; Ghana; Indonesia; Italy; Panama; Peru; Qatar; Slovakia; South Africa

United Nations Security Council Resolution 1761 was unanimously adopted on 20 June 2007.

== Resolution ==
The Security Council this morning extended until 31 October 2007 the mandate of the Group of Experts monitoring the ban imposed on Côte d’Ivoire concerning the trading of arms and rough diamonds.

Unanimously adopting resolution 1761 (2007) under Chapter VII of the United Nations Charter, the Council noted that the ban itself had previously been extended until the same date by resolution 1727 of December 2006. The text of the resolution adopted today requests the Panel of Experts to report to the Council on the implementation of the trade ban before 15 October 2007.

Imposed in 2004, the sanctions are aimed at stemming the civil conflict in Côte d’Ivoire, which is divided into rebel-held northern and Government-controlled southern zones.

== See also ==
- List of United Nations Security Council Resolutions 1701 to 1800 (2006–2008)
