= United Nations Security Council Resolution 1755 =

UN Security Council Resolution 1755
- Date: 30 April 2007
- Meeting no.: 5,670
- Code: S/RES/1755 (Document)
- Subject: Reports of the Secretary-General on the Sudan
- Voting summary: 15 voted for; None voted against; None abstained
- Result: Adopted

Security Council composition
- Permanent members: China; France; Russia; United Kingdom; United States
- Non-permanent members: Belgium; Rep. of the Congo; Ghana; Indonesia; Italy; Panama; Peru; Qatar; Slovakia; South Africa

United Nations Security Council Resolution 1755 was unanimously adopted on 30 April 2007.

== Resolution ==
The Security Council this morning extended the mandate of the United Nations Mission in the Sudan (UNMIS) until 31 October 2007, and requested the Secretary-General to urgently appoint a new Special Representative for that country.

Unanimously adopting resolution 1755 (2007), the Council also called on the parties to the Comprehensive Peace Agreement to accelerate progress on implementing all their commitments, in particular to carry out the establishment of Joint Integrated Units and other aspects of the security sector reforms.

The parties were also called on to re-energize the process of disarmament, demobilization and reintegration of combatants; complete the full and verified redeployment of forces by 9 July 2007; and take the necessary steps to hold national elections according to the agreed time frame, among other things.

The Council also called on the parties to all relevant agreements to respect their commitments and fully implement all the aspects of those agreements without delay. In addition, it called on those parties that had not signed the Darfur Peace Agreement to do so without delay and not to act in any way that would impede its implementation.

Explaining his position prior to the adoption of the text, the representative of Qatar said that the Sudan had taken many positive steps in partnership with the United Nations and the African Union. All that was needed now was assistance based on encouragement and mutual respect, in order to preserve what had been achieved, build on it and protect it from any negative impact.

The purpose of the text, he continued, was to renew the mandate of UNMIS. His delegation had expressed its comments during the consideration of the first version of the text, which exceeded its intended purpose and dealt with various issues that could be dealt with by other mechanisms. Also, the language of the draft was not consistent with recent positive developments in the relations between the Sudan and the United Nations.

== See also ==
- List of United Nations Security Council Resolutions 1701 to 1800 (2006–2008)
