= United Nations Security Council Resolution 1774 =

UN Security Council Resolution 1774
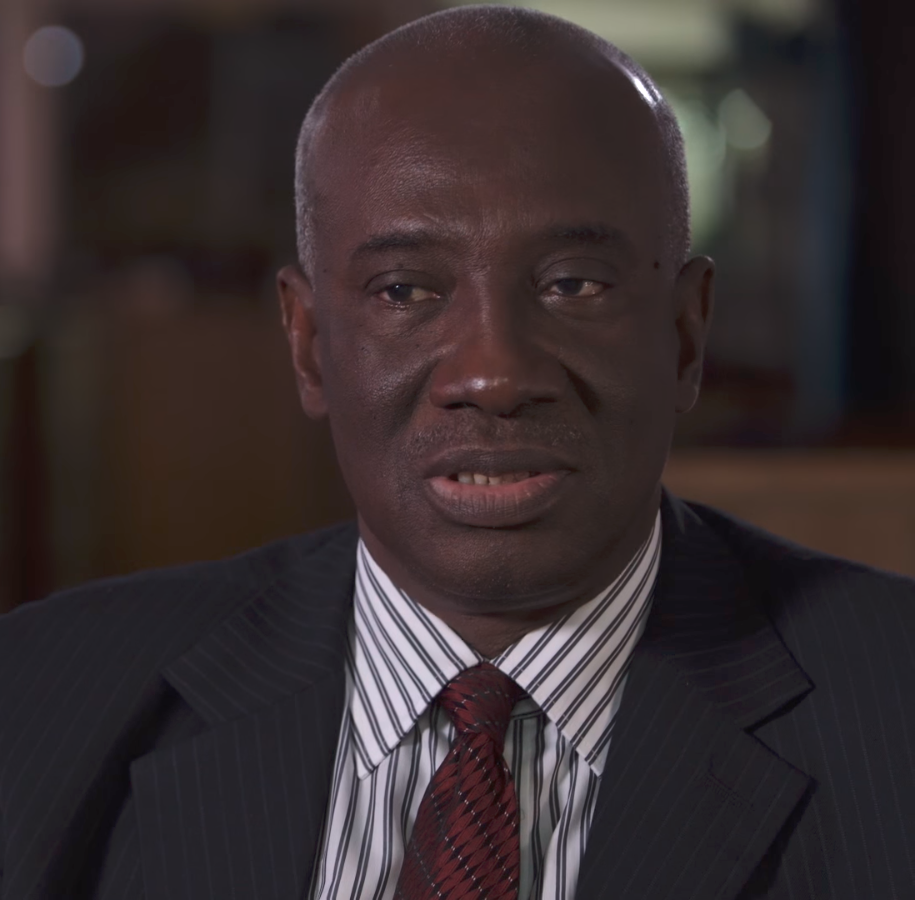
- Jallow in 2016
- Date: 14 September 2007
- Meeting no.: 5,741
- Code: S/RES/1774 (Document)
- Subject: International Criminal Tribunal for Rwanda
- Voting summary: 15 voted for; None voted against; None abstained
- Result: Adopted

Security Council composition
- Permanent members: China; France; Russia; United Kingdom; United States
- Non-permanent members: Belgium; Rep. of the Congo; Ghana; Indonesia; Italy; Panama; Peru; Qatar; Slovakia; South Africa

United Nations Security Council Resolution 1774 was unanimously adopted on 14 September 2007.

== Resolution ==
The Security Council this morning decided to reappoint the Chief Prosecutor of the International Criminal Tribunal for Rwanda, Hassan Bubacar Jallow, for a four-year term, with effect from 15 September 2007, subject to the Council’s earlier termination upon the completion of the Tribunal’s work.

Unanimously adopting resolution 1774 (2007), the Council decided to reappoint Mr. Jallow having considered his nomination by Secretary-General Ban Ki-moon to continue leading the work of the Arusha-based Tribunal.

Recalling its resolution 1534 (2004), which emphasized the importance of fully implementing the International Tribunal’s completion strategy, the Council noted that resolution 1503 (2003) called on the Tribunal to take all possible measures to complete all trial activities at first instance by the end of 2008, and to complete all work in 2010.

== See also ==
- List of United Nations Security Council Resolutions 1701 to 1800 (2006–2008)
