= United Nations Security Council Resolution 1764 =

UN Security Council Resolution 1764
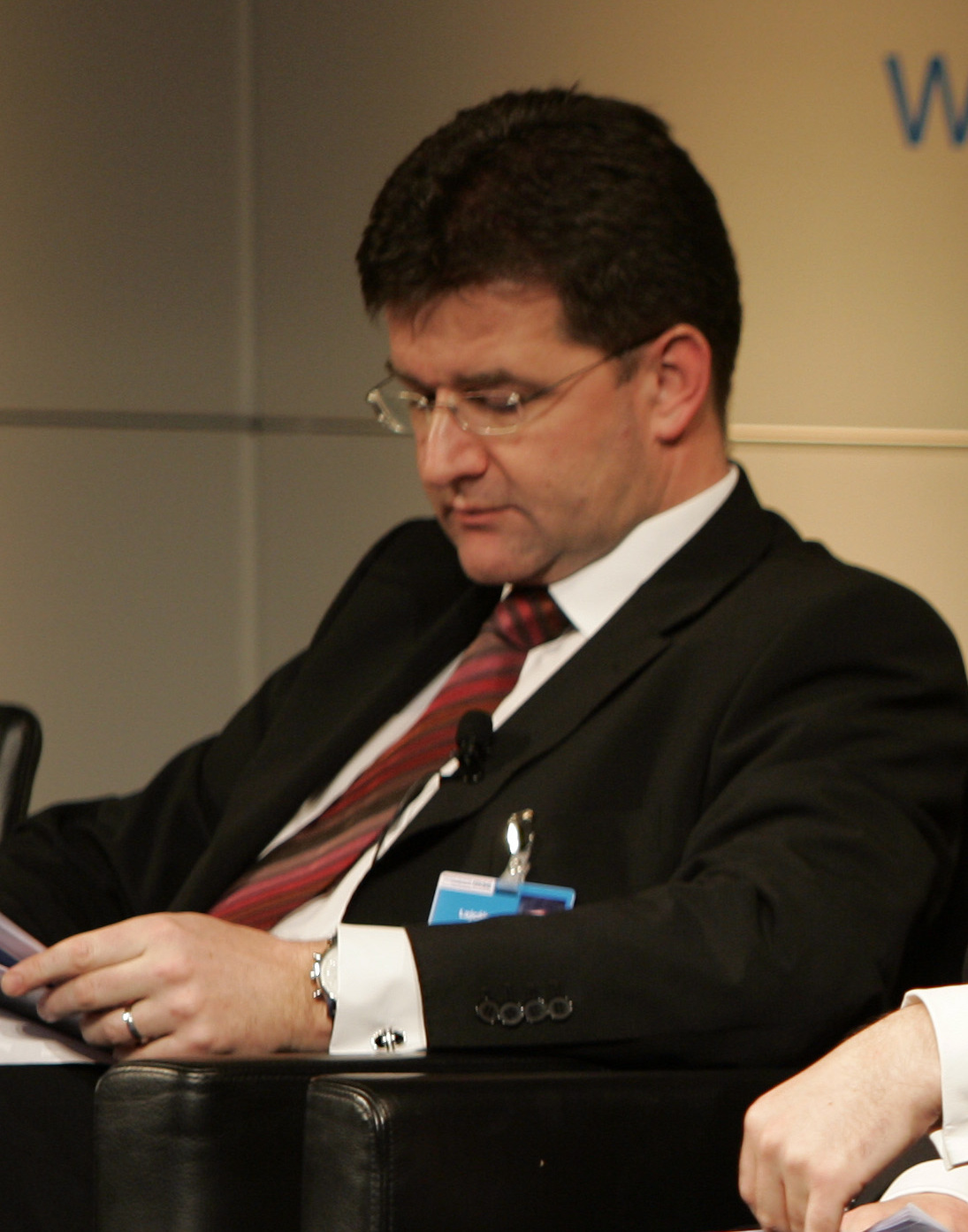
- Miroslav Lajčák in 2009
- Date: 29 June 2007
- Meeting no.: 5,713
- Code: S/RES/1764 (Document)
- Subject: The situation in Bosnia and Herzegovina
- Voting summary: 15 voted for; None voted against; None abstained
- Result: Adopted

Security Council composition
- Permanent members: China; France; Russia; United Kingdom; United States
- Non-permanent members: Belgium; Rep. of the Congo; Ghana; Indonesia; Italy; Panama; Peru; Qatar; Slovakia; South Africa

United Nations Security Council Resolution 1764 was unanimously adopted on 29 June 2007.

The Security Council welcomed and agreed to the designation by the Peace Implementation Council Steering Board of Miroslav Lajčák as the next High Representative for Bosnia and Herzegovina. The Council also paid tribute to the efforts of his predecessor, Christian Schwarz-Schilling.

The resolution was passed unanimously.

== See also ==
- List of United Nations Security Council Resolutions 1701 to 1800 (2006–2008)
