= United Nations Security Council Resolution 1792 =

UN Security Council Resolution 1792
- Date: 19 December 2007
- Meeting no.: 5,810
- Code: S/RES/1792 (Document)
- Subject: The situation in Liberia
- Voting summary: 15 voted for; None voted against; None abstained
- Result: Adopted

Security Council composition
- Permanent members: China; France; Russia; United Kingdom; United States
- Non-permanent members: Belgium; Rep. of the Congo; Ghana; Indonesia; Italy; Panama; Peru; Qatar; Slovakia; South Africa

United Nations Security Council Resolution 1792 was unanimously adopted on 19 December 2007.

== Resolution ==
Based on its assessment of progress made to date towards meeting the conditions for lifting sanctions imposed on Liberia, the Security Council today renewed the arms and travel embargoes for another year.

Unanimously adopting resolution 1792 (2007) under the Charter’s Chapter VII, the Council also extended the mandate of the Panel of Experts monitoring the sanctions until 20 June 2008 to conduct a follow-up mission to the region to investigate the implementation of the measures, to assess the impact and effectiveness of the provision of resolution 1532 (2004) concerning the assets of former Liberian President Charles Taylor, to assess the implementation of Liberian forestry legislation, and to assess Liberia’s compliance with the Kimberley Process Certification Scheme regarding diamonds.

The Council noted with concern the lack of progress in implementing paragraph 1 of resolution 1532 (2004) regarding the assets of the former Liberian President Charles Taylor, his immediate family and other close allies, and called on the Government of Liberia to continue to make all necessary efforts to fulfill its obligations.

The Council encouraged the Government of Liberia to invite the Kimberley Process to conduct a review visit within a year of Liberia’s full participation in and implementation of the Kimberley Process Certification Scheme, and encouraged the Kimberley Process to inform the Council of its assessment of progress made.

== See also ==
- List of United Nations Security Council Resolutions 1701 to 1800 (2006–2008)
