= United Nations Security Council Resolution 1715 =

UN Security Council Resolution 1715
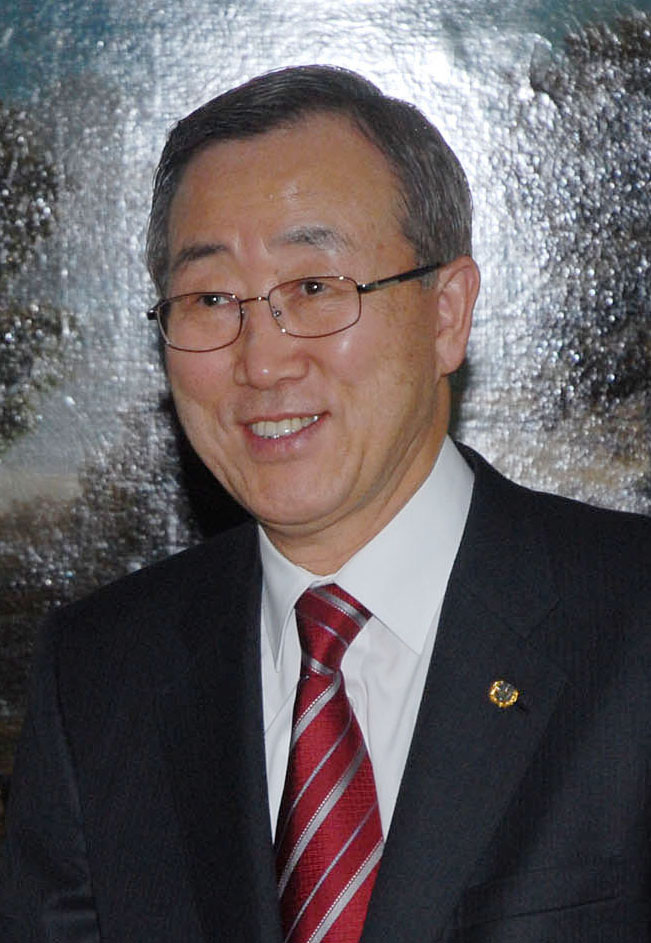
- Ban Ki-moon
- Date: 9 October 2006
- Meeting no.: 5,547
- Code: S/RES/1715 (Document)
- Subject: Recommendation regarding the appointment of the Secretary-General
- Result: Adopted

Security Council composition
- Permanent members: China; France; Russia; United Kingdom; United States
- Non-permanent members: Argentina; Rep. of the Congo; Denmark; Ghana; Greece; Japan; Peru; Qatar; Slovakia; Tanzania

United Nations Security Council Resolution 1715, adopted by acclamation at a closed meeting on October 9, 2006, having considered the question of the recommendation for the appointment of the eighth Secretary-General of the United Nations, the Council recommended to the General Assembly that Mr. Ban Ki-moon of South Korea be appointed for a term of office from January 1, 2007, to December 31, 2011.

Four days later, the General Assembly also voted symbolically to approve the decision of the Security Council.

== See also ==
- List of United Nations Security Council Resolutions 1701 to 1800 (2006–2008)
- Resolutions 1091 (1996), 1358 (2001)
- United Nations Secretary-General selection, 2006
