= United Nations Security Council Resolution 1767 =

UN Security Council Resolution 1767
- Date: 30 July 2007
- Meeting no.: 5,725
- Code: S/RES/1767 (Document)
- Subject: The situation between Eritrea and Ethiopia
- Voting summary: 15 voted for; None voted against; None abstained
- Result: Adopted

Security Council composition
- Permanent members: China; France; Russia; United Kingdom; United States
- Non-permanent members: Belgium; Rep. of the Congo; Ghana; Indonesia; Italy; Panama; Peru; Qatar; Slovakia; South Africa

United Nations Security Council Resolution 1767 was unanimously adopted on 30 July 2007.

== Resolution ==
Unanimously adopting resolution 1767 (2007), the council also reiterated its demand that Eritrea immediately withdraw its troops and heavy military equipment from the Temporary Security Zone, and called on Ethiopia to reduce the number of additional forces recently introduced in areas adjacent to the Zone.

Expressing regret over the lack of progress on demarcation, the Council called upon the parties to implement completely and without further delay or preconditions the delimitation decision of the Eritrea-Ethiopia Boundary Commission, and to participate constructively and with sufficient authority in the 6 September meeting convened by that body in New York.

The Council further reiterated its demand that Eritrea reverse, without further delay or preconditions, all restrictions on UNMEE's movement and operations, and called again on both parties to cooperate with the Mission in urgently reactivating the work of the Military Coordination Commission, a unique forum to discuss pressing military and security issues.

== See also ==
- List of United Nations Security Council Resolutions 1701 to 1800 (2006–2008)
