= United Nations Security Council Resolution 1777 =

UN Security Council Resolution 1777
- Date: 20 September 2007
- Meeting no.: 5,745
- Code: S/RES/1777 (Document)
- Subject: The situation in Liberia
- Voting summary: 15 voted for; None voted against; None abstained
- Result: Adopted

Security Council composition
- Permanent members: China; France; Russia; United Kingdom; United States
- Non-permanent members: Belgium; Rep. of the Congo; Ghana; Indonesia; Italy; Panama; Peru; Qatar; Slovakia; South Africa

United Nations Security Council Resolution 1777 was unanimously adopted on 20 September 2007.

== Resolution ==
The Security Council this morning extended the mandate of the United Nations Mission in Liberia (UNMIL) with one year, until 30 September 2008, while endorsing troop reductions.

Unanimously adopting resolution 1777 (2007) and acting under Chapter VII of the United Nations Charter, the Council endorsed a reduction of 2,450 personnel deployed in the Mission’s military component during the period October 2007 to December 2008, as well as a reduction of 498 police officers during the period April 2008 to December 2010.

The Council further requested the Secretary-General to monitor progress on the core benchmarks set out in his fifteenth progress report (document S/2007/479) with a view to recommend further troop and police reductions. It reaffirmed its intention to authorize the Secretary-General to redeploy troops temporarily, as may be needed, between UNMIL and the United Nations Operation in Côte d'Ivoire (UNOCI).

== See also ==
- List of United Nations Security Council Resolutions 1701 to 1800 (2006–2008)
