= United Nations Security Council Resolution 1729 =

UN Security Council Resolution 1729
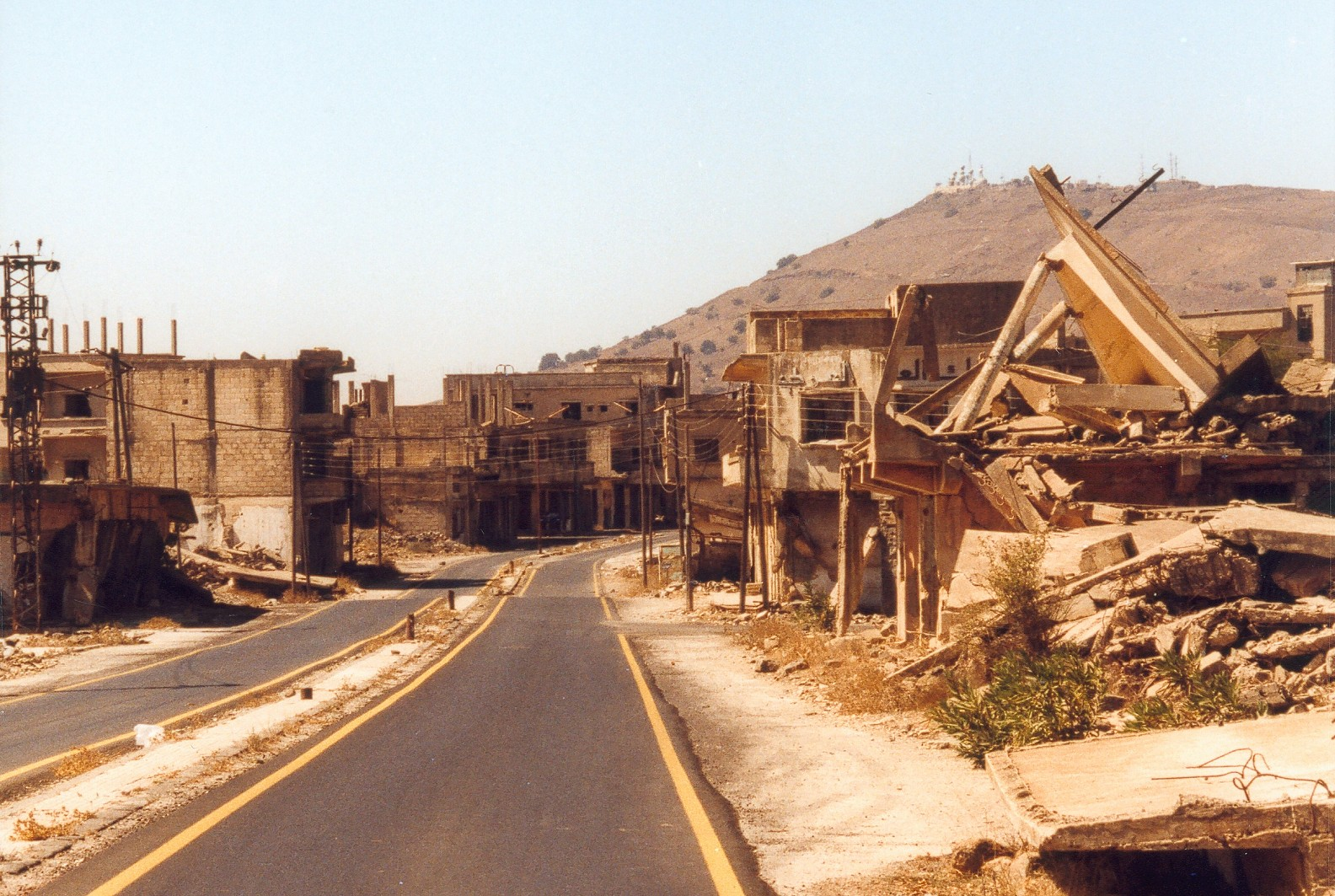
- Qunaitra in the Golan Heights
- Date: 15 December 2006
- Meeting no.: 5,596
- Code: S/RES/1729 (Document)
- Subject: The situation in the Middle East
- Voting summary: 15 voted for; None voted against; None abstained
- Result: Adopted

Security Council composition
- Permanent members: China; France; Russia; United Kingdom; United States
- Non-permanent members: Argentina; Rep. of the Congo; Denmark; Ghana; Greece; Japan; Peru; Qatar; Slovakia; Tanzania

United Nations Security Council Resolution 1729, adopted unanimously on December 15, 2006, after considering a report by the Secretary-General Kofi Annan regarding the United Nations Disengagement Observer Force (UNDOF), the Council extended its mandate for a further six months until June 30, 2007.

== Details ==
The resolution called upon the parties concerned to immediately implement Resolution 338 (1973) and requested that the Secretary-General submit a report on the situation at the end of that period.

The Secretary-General's report pursuant to the previous resolution on UNDOF said that the situation between Israel and Syria had remained generally quiet, though the situation in the Middle East as a whole continued to remain tense until a settlement addressing all aspects of the problem could be reached.

The Council also welcomed efforts by UNDOF to implement the zero-tolerance sexual exploitation policy.

== See also ==
- Arab–Israeli conflict
- Golan Heights
- Israel–Syria relations
- List of United Nations Security Council Resolutions 1701 to 1800 (2006–2008)
- 2000–2006 Shebaa Farms conflict
