= United Nations Security Council Resolution 1793 =

UN Security Council Resolution 1793
- Date: 21 December 2007
- Meeting no.: 5,813
- Code: S/RES/1793 (Document)
- Subject: The situation in Sierra Leone
- Voting summary: 15 voted for; None voted against; None abstained
- Result: Adopted

Security Council composition
- Permanent members: China; France; Russia; United Kingdom; United States
- Non-permanent members: Belgium; Rep. of the Congo; Ghana; Indonesia; Italy; Panama; Peru; Qatar; Slovakia; South Africa

United Nations Security Council Resolution 1793 was unanimously adopted on 21 December 2007.

== Resolution ==
The Security Council this morning extended the mandate of the United Nations Integrated Office in Sierra Leone (UNIOSIL) until 30 September 2008, with an eye to terminating the mandate at that time.

Unanimously adopting resolution 1793 (2007), the Council requested the Secretary-General to submit by 31 January 2008 a completion strategy for the Office, including at least a 20 per cent reduction in staff by 31 March 2008; a continued mission at 80 per cent of the current strength until 30 June 2008; and the termination of UNIOSIL’s mandate by 30 September 2008.

By the terms of the text, the Council expressed its intention that, on the expiration of its mandate, UNIOSIL should be replaced by a United Nations integrated political office to carry forward the peacebuilding process, mobilize international donor support, support the work of the Peacebuilding Commission and Fund, promote national reconciliation and support the constitutional reform process. It requested the Secretary-General to submit specific proposals to that end in April 2008.

The Council called upon all parties in Sierra Leone to ensure that the 2008 local elections are peaceful, transparent, free and fair, and called upon the Government to provide the necessary support for the electoral institutions. It encouraged the Government to continue its close engagement with the Peacebuilding Commission, including through the regular monitoring of progress in the implementation of the Sierra Leone Peacebuilding Cooperation Framework.

Acting under Chapter VII of the Charter of the United Nations, the Council decided to exempt from the travel ban measures imposed by paragraph 5 of resolution 1132 (1997) the travel of any witnesses whose presence at trial before the Special Court for Sierra Leone was required.

== See also ==
- List of United Nations Security Council Resolutions 1701 to 1800 (2006–2008)
