= United Nations Security Council Resolution 1785 =

UN Security Council Resolution 1785
- Date: 21 November 2007
- Meeting no.: 5,782
- Code: S/RES/1785 (Document)
- Subject: The situation in Bosnia and Herzegovina
- Voting summary: 15 voted for; None voted against; None abstained
- Result: Adopted

Security Council composition
- Permanent members: China; France; Russia; United Kingdom; United States
- Non-permanent members: Belgium; Rep. of the Congo; Ghana; Indonesia; Italy; Panama; Peru; Qatar; Slovakia; South Africa

United Nations Security Council Resolution 1785 was unanimously adopted on 21 November 2007.

== Resolution ==
Noting that Bosnia and Herzegovina had thus far made only “very limited” progress towards benchmarks for integration with the European Union, the Security Council this morning authorized for a further year the European Union Stabilization Force (EUFOR) mandated to ensure continued compliance with the Dayton Peace Agreement that ended fighting in the country in 1995.

Unanimously adopting resolution 1785 (2007), the Council also authorized the continued presence of a headquarters for the North Atlantic Treaty Organization (NATO), which led the SFOR stabilization force that handed over peacekeeping responsibilities to EUFOR in 2004, and recognized the right of both organizations to take all necessary measures to defend themselves from attacks or threats.

The Council reiterated that the primary responsibility for the further implementation of the Peace Agreement lay with the Bosnian authorities. Their compliance –- including the surrender for trial of all persons indicted by the International Tribunal for the Former Yugoslavia – will determine the continued willingness of the international community and major donors to provide support, the resolution said.

The Council also emphasized its full support for the High Representative in monitoring implementation of the Peace Agreement and recognized that he is the final authority in theatre regarding the interpretation of civilian implementation of the Agreement.

== See also ==
- List of United Nations Security Council Resolutions 1701 to 1800 (2006–2008)
