= United Nations Security Council Resolution 1775 =

UN Security Council Resolution 1775
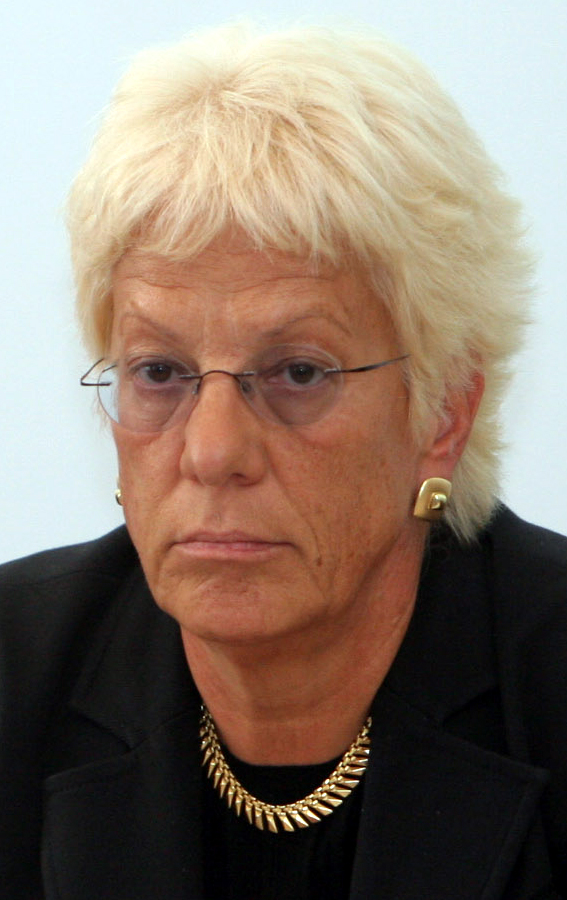
- Carla Del Ponte in 2006
- Date: 14 September 2007
- Meeting no.: 5,742
- Code: S/RES/1775 (Document)
- Subject: International Criminal Tribunal for the former Yugoslavia
- Voting summary: 14 voted for; None voted against; 1 abstained
- Result: Adopted

Security Council composition
- Permanent members: China; France; Russia; United Kingdom; United States
- Non-permanent members: Belgium; Rep. of the Congo; Ghana; Indonesia; Italy; Panama; Peru; Qatar; Slovakia; South Africa

United Nations Security Council Resolution 1775 was adopted on 14 September 2007.

== Resolution ==
Acting on the recommendation of Secretary-General Ban Ki-moon, the Security Council today extended through the end of this year the appointment of Carla Del Ponte as Prosecutor of the International Criminal Tribunal for the former Yugoslavia.

By a vote of 14 in favour, with one abstention (Russian Federation), the Council adopted resolution 1775 (2007), extending Ms. Del Ponte’s appointment, which was to end today, for a final period that would end on 31 December 2007.

In a letter sent to the Council President earlier this week (document S/2007/538), the Secretary-General noted that, although Ms. Del Ponte had indicated that she did not wish to be reappointed for a new term, she would be willing to have her present term extended through the end of the year, pending the appointment of a new Prosecutor.

To that end, the Secretary-General said that, as the Tribunal moved closer to the completion of its mandate, extending Ms. Del Ponte’s term would allow more time for appropriate consultations regarding the appointment of a successor. Moreover, in the interest of the Tribunal’s continuity, stability and effectiveness, the extension would also avoid difficulties associated with an interim solution “at a critical time in its operations”. Suggesting that the Council consider taking such action, he added that, in due course, he would submit the name of his nominee for the position of Prosecutor.

After the Council’s action, the representative of the Russian Federation said that his delegation shared the wider Council’s understanding concerning the need to defer the question of appointing a new Prosecutor for the former Yugoslavia Tribunal. There were several ways of resolving that essentially technical issue, but the method that had been introduced to address the issue appeared to be the least successful one.

== See also ==
- List of United Nations Security Council Resolutions 1701 to 1800 (2006–2008)
