= United Nations Security Council Resolution 1739 =

UN Security Council Resolution 1739
- Date: 10 January 2007
- Meeting no.: 5,617
- Code: S/RES/1739 (Document)
- Subject: The situation in Côte d'Ivoire
- Voting summary: 15 voted for; None voted against; None abstained
- Result: Adopted

Security Council composition
- Permanent members: China; France; Russia; United Kingdom; United States
- Non-permanent members: Belgium; Rep. of the Congo; Ghana; Indonesia; Italy; Panama; Peru; Qatar; Slovakia; South Africa

United Nations Security Council Resolution 1739 was unanimously adopted on 10 January 2007.

== Resolution ==
Unanimously adopting resolution 1739 (2007) under Chapter VII, the Council, having taken note of the latest report of the Secretary-General on the situation, in which he said that some of the Ivorian parties were pursuing actions that could lead to widespread violence, decided to adjust certain terms of UNOCI’s mandate from the date of adoption of today’s text.

Under the terms of the resolution, UNOCI would monitor the cessation of hostilities and movements of armed groups. In particular, it would observe and monitor the implementation of the joint declaration of the end of the war of 6 April 2005 and the comprehensive ceasefire agreement of 3 May 2003, to prevent, within its capabilities and areas of deployment, any hostile action and investigate violations of the ceasefire.

Among its other tasks, UNOCI would liaise with the National Armed Forces of Côte d'Ivoire and the Forces Nouvelles, in order to promote the re-establishment of trust among all the Ivorian forces, and assist the Government in monitoring the borders, with particular attention to the situation of Liberian refugees and any cross-border movement of combatants. It would also assist the Government in regrouping all the Ivorian forces involved and assist in ensuring the security of their disarmament, cantonment and demobilization sites.

UNOCI would also coordinate closely with the United Nations Mission in Liberia (UNMIL) in the implementation of a voluntary repatriation and resettlement programme for foreign ex-combatants, paying special attention to the specific needs of women and children. It would secure, neutralize or destroy any weapons, ammunition or any other military materiel surrendered by the former combatants.

== See also ==
- List of United Nations Security Council Resolutions 1701 to 1800
