= United Nations Security Council Resolution 1762 =

UN Security Council Resolution 1762
- Date: 29 June 2007
- Meeting no.: 5,710
- Code: S/RES/1762 (Document)
- Subject: The situation concerning Iraq
- Voting summary: 14 voted for; None voted against; 1 abstained
- Result: Adopted

Security Council composition
- Permanent members: China; France; Russia; United Kingdom; United States
- Non-permanent members: Belgium; Rep. of the Congo; Ghana; Indonesia; Italy; Panama; Peru; Qatar; Slovakia; South Africa

United Nations Security Council Resolution 1762 was adopted on 29 June 2007.

== Resolution ==
Resolution 1762 (2007), submitted by the United Kingdom and the United States, was adopted by a vote of 14 in favour to none against, with the Russian Federation abstaining. By the text, the 15-member body also decided to terminate the related Nuclear Verification Office of the International Atomic Energy Agency (IAEA) in Iraq.

Additionally, the Council requested Secretary-General Ban Ki-moon to transfer all remaining unencumbered funds in the UNMOVIC escrow account to the Government of Iraq, through the Development Fund for Iraq within the next three months, and to take measures to ensure that sensitive information related to the proliferation of weapons of mass destruction, from UNMOVIC's archives, be kept under strict control.

A further term of the text invited the Iraqi Government to report to the Council within one year on progress made in adhering to all applicable disarmament and non-proliferation treaties and related international agreements, notably the Convention on the Prohibition of the Development, Production, Stockpiling and Use of Chemical Weapons (Chemical Weapons Convention) and the Additional Protocol to its Safeguards Agreement.

Annexed to the resolution is a letter from U.S. Secretary of State Condoleezza Rice and David Miliband, the Foreign Secretary of the United Kingdom, informing the Council that all appropriate steps had been taken to "secure, remove, disable, render harmless, eliminate or destroy" Iraq's known weapons of mass destruction, and all known elements of its programmes to develop such weapons. A letter from Hoshyar Zebari, the Foreign Minister of Iraq, also annexed to the resolution, requested the termination of the UNMOVIC and IAEA team mandates.

== See also ==
- List of United Nations Security Council Resolutions 1701 to 1800 (2006–2008)
