= United Nations Security Council Resolution 1797 =

UN Security Council Resolution 1797
- UN flag
- Date: 30 January 2008
- Meeting no.: 5,828
- Code: S/RES/1797 (Document)
- Subject: The situation concerning the Democratic Republic of the Congo
- Voting summary: 15 voted for; None voted against; None abstained
- Result: Adopted

Security Council composition
- Permanent members: China; France; Russia; United Kingdom; United States
- Non-permanent members: Burkina Faso; Belgium; Costa Rica; Croatia; Indonesia; Italy; Libya; Panama; South Africa; Vietnam

United Nations Security Council Resolution 1797 was unanimously adopted on 30 January 2008.

== Resolution ==
The Security Council, reaffirming its commitment to contribute to the consolidation of peace and stability in the Democratic Republic of the Congo’s post-transition period, today authorized the United Nations Mission there to assist the Congolese authorities in organizing, preparing and conducting local elections.

Unanimously adopting resolution 1797 (2008), tabled by France, the Council-based that decision on the Secretary-General’s recommendations, conveyed to the Council in letters dated 11 October and 30 November 2007 (document S/2007/694), and in his report on the United Nations Organization Mission in the Democratic Republic of the Congo (MONUC) of 14 November 2007 (document S/2007/671).

In response to requests by Council members for information regarding the cost of MONUC’s support for the elections—anticipated in the latter half of the year—the letter, dated 30 November, attaches preliminary estimates. In its last action concerning MONUC, on 21 December 2007, the Council extended its mandate through 31 December 2008 by adopting resolution 1794 (2007).

Also during today’s meeting, Council President Giadalla Ettalhi (Libya) read out a statement congratulating President Joseph Kabila and the Government of the Democratic Republic of the Congo, as well as the organizers of and participants in the Conference for Peace, Security and Development in North and South Kivu, on the success of that event, held in Goma from 6 to 23 January.

The Council was particularly pleased that the armed groups in North and South Kivu had undertaken to observe a complete and immediate ceasefire, to begin the withdrawal of their forces, and to abide strictly by the rules of international humanitarian and human rights law, as set out in statements of commitment signed by the Government on 23 January.

In the framework of the fight against impunity, the Council, while noting the Government’s pledge to seek parliamentary approval of an amnesty law covering acts of war and insurrection, welcomed the exclusion of genocide, war crimes and crimes against humanity from the scope of that amnesty.

== See also ==
- List of United Nations Security Council Resolutions 1701 to 1800 (2006–2008)
