= United Nations Security Council Resolution 1776 =

UN Security Council Resolution 1776
- Date: 19 September 2007
- Meeting no.: 5,744
- Code: S/RES/1776 (Document)
- Subject: The situation in Afghanistan
- Voting summary: 14 voted for; None voted against; 1 abstained
- Result: Adopted

Security Council composition
- Permanent members: China; France; Russia; United Kingdom; United States
- Non-permanent members: Belgium; Rep. of the Congo; Ghana; Indonesia; Italy; Panama; Peru; Qatar; Slovakia; South Africa

United Nations Security Council Resolution 1776 was adopted on 19 September 2007.

== Resolution ==
Strongly condemning the violence that continued to destabilize Afghanistan, the Security Council decided this afternoon to extend the authorization of the International Security Assistance Force (ISAF) in that country for another year beyond 13 October 2007.

By resolution 1776 (2007), adopted under Chapter VII of the United Nations Charter by a recorded vote of 14 in favour to none against, with 1 abstention (Russian Federation), the council also called on Member States to contribute personnel, equipment and funding to strengthen the Force and make it more effective.

It stressed, in addition, the importance of improving Afghan security services in order to provide long-term solutions to the violence in the country, and encouraged ISAF and other partners to sustain their efforts to train and empower the National Police and other Afghan forces.

Speaking before the vote, the representative of the Russian Federation said his country had traditionally supported ISAF and the continuation of its mandate as the Force continued to be important in combating the terrorist threat posed by the Taliban and Al-Qaida. However, the Russian delegation had abstained in the vote because the new issue of maritime interception had yet to be clarified.

In statements after the vote, the representatives of Italy and China said they had voted in favour of the resolution because it gave the best support to Afghanistan's stability. China's representative, however, expressed the hope that future decisions on the issue would be made by consensus.

== See also ==
- List of United Nations Security Council Resolutions 1701 to 1800 (2006–2008)
