= United Nations Security Council Resolution 1786 =

UN Security Council Resolution 1786
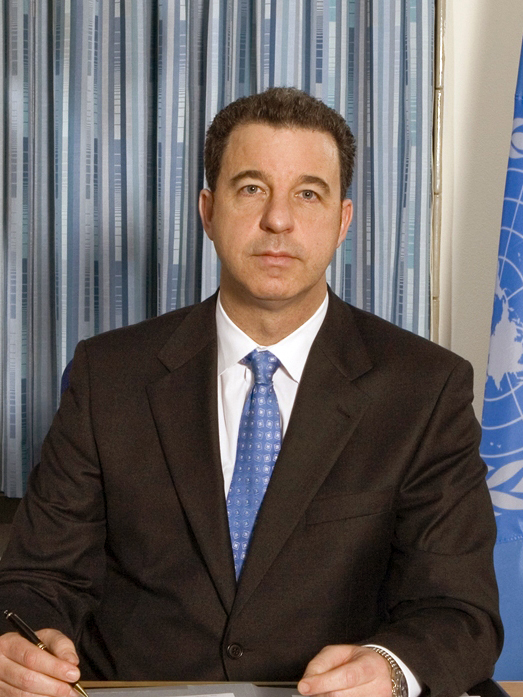
- Serge Brammertz
- Date: 28 November 2007
- Meeting no.: 5,785
- Code: S/RES/1786 (Document)
- Subject: International Criminal Tribunal for the former Yugoslavia
- Voting summary: 15 voted for; None voted against; None abstained
- Result: Adopted

Security Council composition
- Permanent members: China; France; Russia; United Kingdom; United States
- Non-permanent members: Belgium; Rep. of the Congo; Ghana; Indonesia; Italy; Panama; Peru; Qatar; Slovakia; South Africa

United Nations Security Council Resolution 1786 was unanimously adopted on 28 November 2007.

== Resolution ==
The Security Council this morning decided to appoint Serge Brammertz, former head of the international investigation into the assassination of Lebanon’s former Prime Minister, as Prosecutor of the International Tribunal for the former Yugoslavia, starting 1 January 2008.

Unanimously adopting resolution 1786 (2007), the Council said that the four-year tenure for Mr. Brammertz was subject to earlier termination depending on the completion of the Tribunal’s work, recalling that resolution 1503 (2003) had asked the court to take all possible measures to complete all trial activities at first instance by the end of 2008, and to finish all its work during 2010.

Mr. Brammertz, a former Belgian prosecutor, served as a Deputy Prosecutor with the International Criminal Court, before becoming the Commissioner of the United Nations International Independent Investigation Commission into the 2005 bombing that killed former Lebanese Prime Minister Rafiq Hariri.

At the Tribunal, he replaces Carla del Ponte, who notified Secretary-General Ban Ki-moon earlier this year that she did not wish to be considered for another term as Prosecutor, according to a 12 November letter from Mr. Ban to the Council (document S/2007/678), which put forth Mr. Brammertz’ nomination for the position.

== See also ==
- List of United Nations Security Council Resolutions 1701 to 1800 (2006–2008)
