= United Nations Security Council Resolution 1765 =

UN Security Council Resolution 1765
- Date: 16 July 2007
- Meeting no.: 5,716
- Code: S/RES/1765 (Document)
- Subject: The situation in Côte d’Ivoire
- Voting summary: 15 voted for; None voted against; None abstained
- Result: Adopted

Security Council composition
- Permanent members: China; France; Russia; United Kingdom; United States
- Non-permanent members: Belgium; Rep. of the Congo; Ghana; Indonesia; Italy; Panama; Peru; Qatar; Slovakia; South Africa

United Nations Security Council Resolution 1765 was unanimously adopted on 16 July 2007.

== Resolution ==
Determining that the situation in Côte d’Ivoire continues to pose a threat to international peace and security, the Security Council this morning decided to renew the mandate of the United Nations Operation in that country and of the French forces that support it until 15 January 2008, in order to support the organization of transparent electionswithin the time frame set out in the recently signed Ouagadougou political Agreement.

Unanimously adopting resolution 1765 (2007) and acting under Chapter VII of the United Nations Charter, the Council endorsed the Secretary-General's recommendations contained in his most recent progress report on the United Nations Operation in Côte d’Ivoire (UNOCI) (document S/2007/275), which adapt the mission's role to the new phase of the peace process in Côte d’Ivoire, as set out in the Ouagadougou Agreement.

[That Agreement, signed on 4 March 2007 by President Laurent Gbagbo and Guillaume Soro in Ouagadougou under the facilitation of the Chair of the Economic Community of West African States (ECOWAS), President Blaise Compaoré of Burkina Faso, sets out a series of measures to deal with the political divide. It calls, among other steps, for creating a new transitional Government; organizing free and fair presidential elections; merging the Forces Nouvelles and the national defence and security forces through the establishment of an integrated command centre; dismantling the militias, disarming ex-combatants and enrolling them in civil services programmes; and replacing the so-called zone of confidence separating north and south with a green line to be monitored by UNOCI.]

== See also ==
- List of United Nations Security Council Resolutions 1701 to 1800 (2006–2008)
