= United Nations Security Council Resolution 1773 =

UN Security Council Resolution 1773
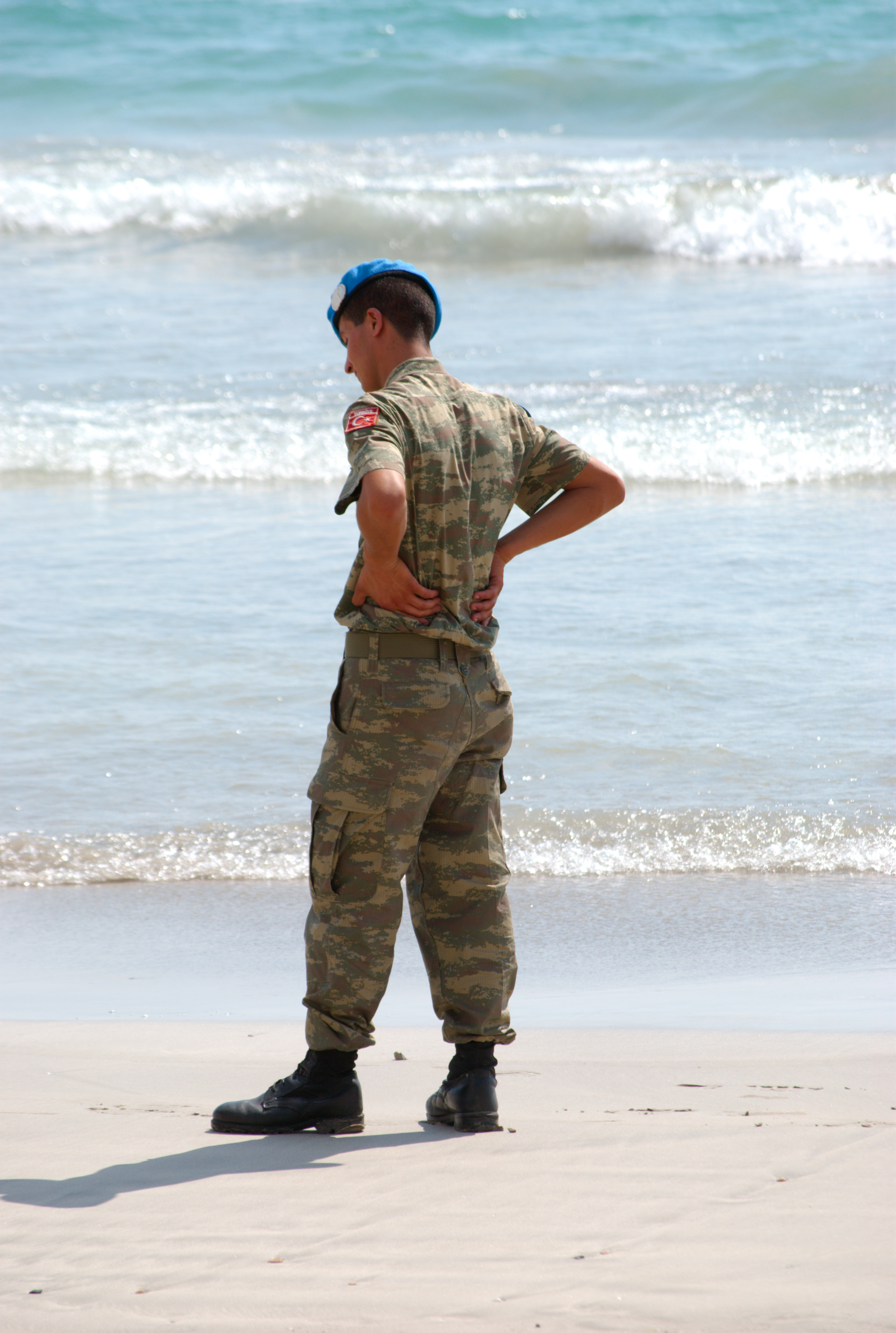
- UNIFIL soldier
- Date: 24 August 2007
- Meeting no.: 5,733
- Code: S/RES/1773 (Document)
- Subject: The situation in the Middle East
- Voting summary: 15 voted for; None voted against; None abstained
- Result: Adopted

Security Council composition
- Permanent members: China; France; Russia; United Kingdom; United States
- Non-permanent members: Belgium; Rep. of the Congo; Ghana; Indonesia; Italy; Panama; Peru; Qatar; Slovakia; South Africa

United Nations Security Council Resolution 1773 was unanimously adopted on 24 August 2007.

== Resolution ==
Determining that the situation in Lebanon continues to constitute a threat to international peace and security, the Security Council extended the present mandate of the United Nations Interim Force in Lebanon (UNIFIL) for another year, until 31 August 2008.

By the terms of resolution 1773 (2007), which was unanimously adopted, the Council called upon all parties concerned to respect the cessation of hostilities and the Blue Line in its entirety and urged them to cooperate fully with the United Nations and UNIFIL and scrupulously respect the safety of their personnel, avoiding any action that endangered those staff and according them full freedom of movement within the Force’s area of operation.

Further, the Council also called upon the parties to cooperate fully with the Security Council and the Secretary-General to achieve a permanent ceasefire and a long-term solution, as envisioned in resolution 1701 (2006), and emphasized the need for greater progress in that regard.

The Force’s mandate was extended at the request of the Prime Minister of Lebanon (document S/2007/396) and the recommendations of the Secretary-General, who, in his recent letter to the President of the Council (document S/2007/470), noted that, while the swift and effective deployment of UNIFIL had helped to establish a new strategic, military and security environment in southern Lebanon, much work remained to be done, as tragically shown by recent events in the country.

== See also ==
- List of United Nations Security Council Resolutions 1701 to 1800 (2006–2008)
