= United Nations Security Council Resolution 1750 =

UN Security Council Resolution 1750
- Date: 30 March 2007
- Meeting no.: 5,652
- Code: S/RES/1750 (Document)
- Subject: The situation in Liberia
- Voting summary: 15 voted for; None voted against; None abstained
- Result: Adopted

Security Council composition
- Permanent members: China; France; Russia; United Kingdom; United States
- Non-permanent members: Belgium; Rep. of the Congo; Ghana; Indonesia; Italy; Panama; Peru; Qatar; Slovakia; South Africa

United Nations Security Council Resolution 1750 was unanimously adopted on 30 March 2007.

== Resolution ==
The Security Council this morning extended the mandate of the United Nations Mission in Liberia (UNMIL), which was to expire tomorrow at midnight, until 30 September, while requesting the Secretary-General to present a detailed drawdown plan for the operation no later than 45 days before mandate expiration.

Unanimously adopting resolution 1750 (2007), the Council further decided to include an additional element to UNMIL’s mandate, by providing administrative and related support and security for activities conducted in Liberia by the Special Court for Sierra Leone. Those activities would be carried out on a cost-reimbursable basis and with the consent of the Government of Liberia.

== See also ==
- List of United Nations Security Council Resolutions 1701 to 1800 (2006–2008)
