= United Nations Security Council Resolution 1742 =

UN Security Council Resolution 1742
- Date: 15 February 2007
- Meeting no.: 5,630
- Code: S/RES/1742 (Document)
- Subject: The situation concerning the Democratic Republic of the Congo
- Voting summary: 15 voted for; None voted against; None abstained
- Result: Adopted

Security Council composition
- Permanent members: China; France; Russia; United Kingdom; United States
- Non-permanent members: Belgium; Rep. of the Congo; Ghana; Indonesia; Italy; Panama; Peru; Qatar; Slovakia; South Africa

United Nations Security Council Resolution 1742 was unanimously adopted on 15 February 2007.

== Resolution ==
The Security Council this morning extended the mandate and personnel strength of the United Nations Organization Mission in the Democratic Republic of the Congo (MONUC), which was to expire today, until 15 April.

Unanimously adopting resolution 1742 (2007) and acting under Chapter VII of the United Nations Charter, the Council requested the Secretary-General to report, as soon as possible and not later than 15 March, on his consultations with the Congolese authorities and to submit recommendations on adjustments the Council might consider making to the mandate and capacities of MONUC.

== See also ==
- List of United Nations Security Council Resolutions 1701 to 1800
