= United Nations Security Council Resolution 1705 =

UN Security Council Resolution 1705
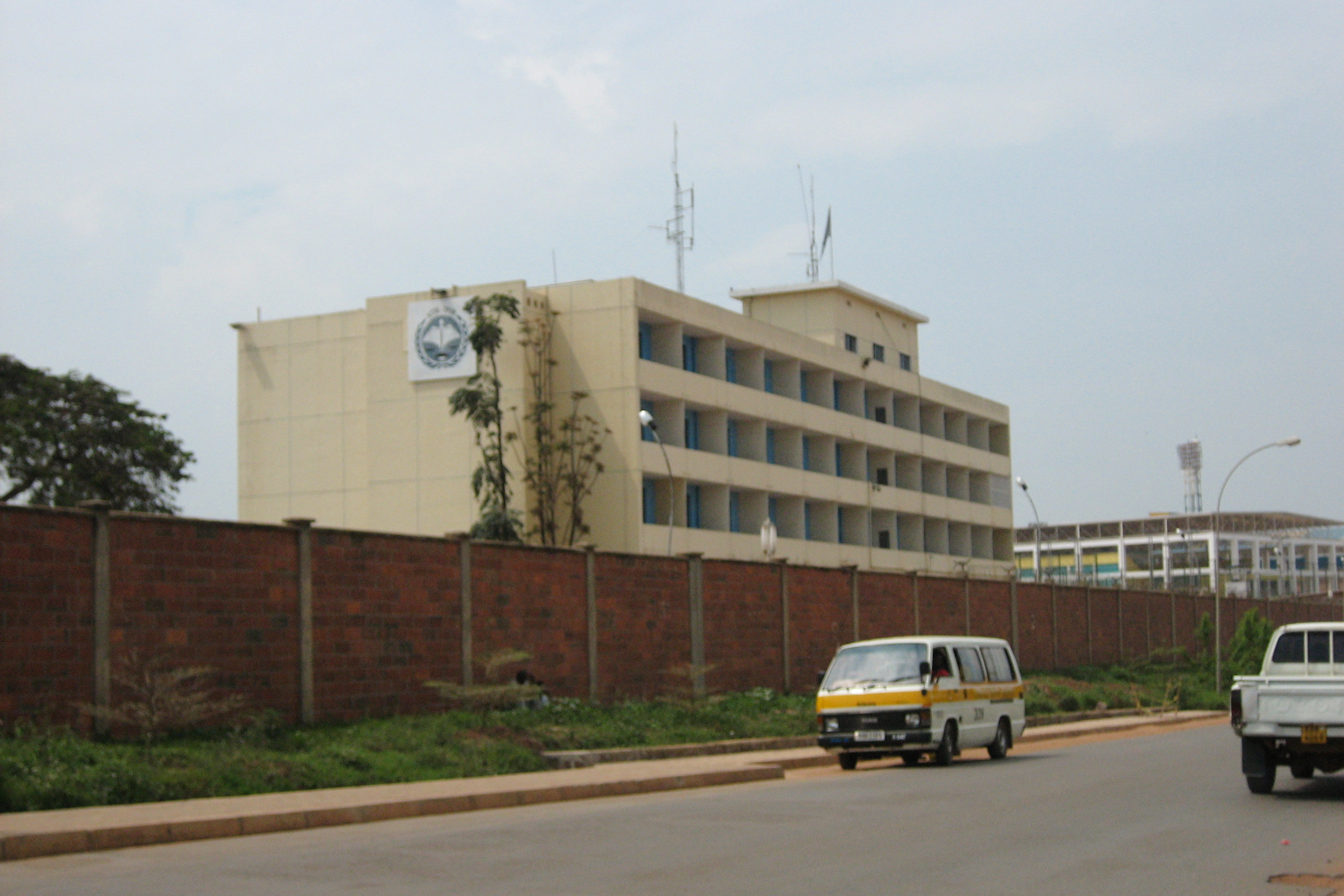
- ICTR in Kigali, Rwanda
- Date: 29 August 2006
- Meeting no.: 5,518
- Code: S/RES/1705 (Document)
- Subject: The International Criminal Tribunal for Rwanda
- Voting summary: 15 voted for; None voted against; None abstained
- Result: Adopted

Security Council composition
- Permanent members: China; France; Russia; United Kingdom; United States
- Non-permanent members: Argentina; Rep. of the Congo; Denmark; Ghana; Greece; Japan; Peru; Qatar; Slovakia; Tanzania

United Nations Security Council Resolution 1705, adopted unanimously on August 29, 2006, after noting a letter from the President of the Security Council, the Council extended the term of Judge Solomy Balungi Bossa at the International Criminal Tribunal for Rwanda (ICTR).

The extension permitted Judge Bossa to complete the Butare case, beyond the expiry of her term of office on June 24, 2007.

== See also ==
- List of United Nations Security Council Resolutions 1701 to 1800 (2006–2008)
- Rwandan genocide
