= United Nations Security Council Resolution 1789 =

UN Security Council Resolution 1789
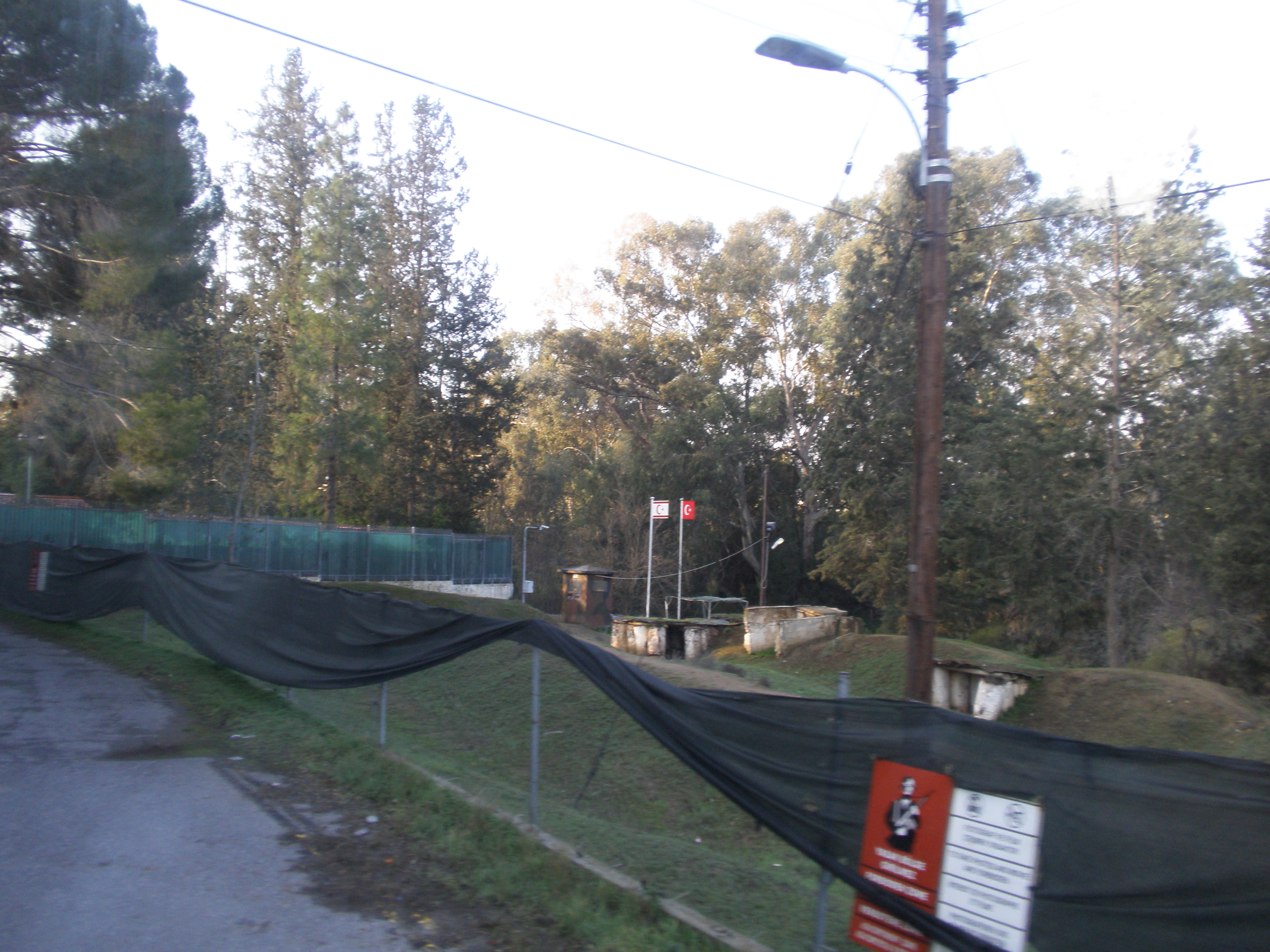
- Division in Nicosia
- Date: 14 December 2007
- Meeting no.: 5,803
- Code: S/RES/1789 (Document)
- Subject: The situation in Cyprus
- Voting summary: 15 voted for; None voted against; None abstained
- Result: Adopted

Security Council composition
- Permanent members: China; France; Russia; United Kingdom; United States
- Non-permanent members: Belgium; Rep. of the Congo; Ghana; Indonesia; Italy; Panama; Peru; Qatar; Slovakia; South Africa

United Nations Security Council Resolution 1789 was unanimously adopted on 14 December 2007.

== Resolution ==
The Security Council this morning extended the mandate of the 43-year-old United Nations Peacekeeping Force in Cyprus (UNFICYP) through 15 June 2008.

Unanimously adopting resolution 1789 (2007), the Council also noted with concern the lack of progress on "the 8 July process" and called on all parties to immediately engage constructively with the United Nations efforts, and to cease mutual recriminations. It urged all parties to show flexibility and political will over the coming months to make measurable progress to allow fully fledged negotiations to begin.

On 8 July last year, the Greek Cypriot and Turkish Cypriot leaders signed a set of principles and decisions, recognizing that the status quo was unacceptable and that a comprehensive settlement was both desirable and possible. They agreed to begin immediately a two-track process involving discussions by technical committees of issues affecting the day-to-day life of the people, and concurrently, consideration by working groups of substantive issues, leading to a comprehensive settlement. They also committed to ending mutual recriminations.

== See also ==
- List of United Nations Security Council Resolutions 1701 to 1800 (2006–2008)
