= United Nations Security Council Resolution 1727 =

UN Security Council Resolution 1727
- Flag of Côte d'Ivoire
- Date: 15 December 2006
- Meeting no.: 5,592
- Code: S/RES/1727 (Document)
- Subject: The situation in Côte d'Ivoire
- Voting summary: 15 voted for; None voted against; None abstained
- Result: Adopted

Security Council composition
- Permanent members: China; France; Russia; United Kingdom; United States
- Non-permanent members: Argentina; Rep. of the Congo; Denmark; Ghana; Greece; Japan; Peru; Qatar; Slovakia; Tanzania

United Nations Security Council Resolution 1727, adopted unanimously on December 15, 2006, after recalling previous resolutions on the situation in Côte d'Ivoire (Ivory Coast), the Council renewed an arms and diamond embargo on the country until October 31, 2007.

== Resolution ==
=== Observations ===
The Security Council expressed its concern at the persistence of the political crisis in Côte d'Ivoire and the deterioration of the situation; there was large-scale suffering and displacement. It determined the situation in the country to be a threat to international peace and security.

=== Acts ===
The Chapter VII resolution renewed sanctions imposed through resolutions 1572 (2004) and 1643 (2005) until the end of October 2007. It demanded that all Ivorian parties provide unlimited access to the expert group monitoring the sanctions and to personnel from the United Nations Operation in Côte d'Ivoire (UNOCI) and Opération Licorne, reaffirming that any attack on or the obstruction of the personnel would constitute a threat to the reconciliation process.

The mandate of the expert panel monitoring the implementation of the sanctions was extended by six months, until January 10, 2007, and the Secretary-General was requested to report on the situation.

Finally, the Council declared that it would impose targeted sanctions against individuals who:

- posed a threat to peace and reconciliation;
- attacked or prevented the UNOCI, French forces, High Representative for the Elections, of the International Working Group, of the Mediator or his representative from carrying out their functions;
- were responsible for violations of human rights and international humanitarian law;
- incited hatred and violence;
- violated the sanctions imposed by the Security Council.

== See also ==
- First Ivorian Civil War
- List of United Nations Security Council Resolutions 1701 to 1800 (2006–2008)
- Opération Licorne
- United Nations Operation in Côte d'Ivoire
