= United Nations Security Council Resolution 1748 =

UN Security Council Resolution 1748
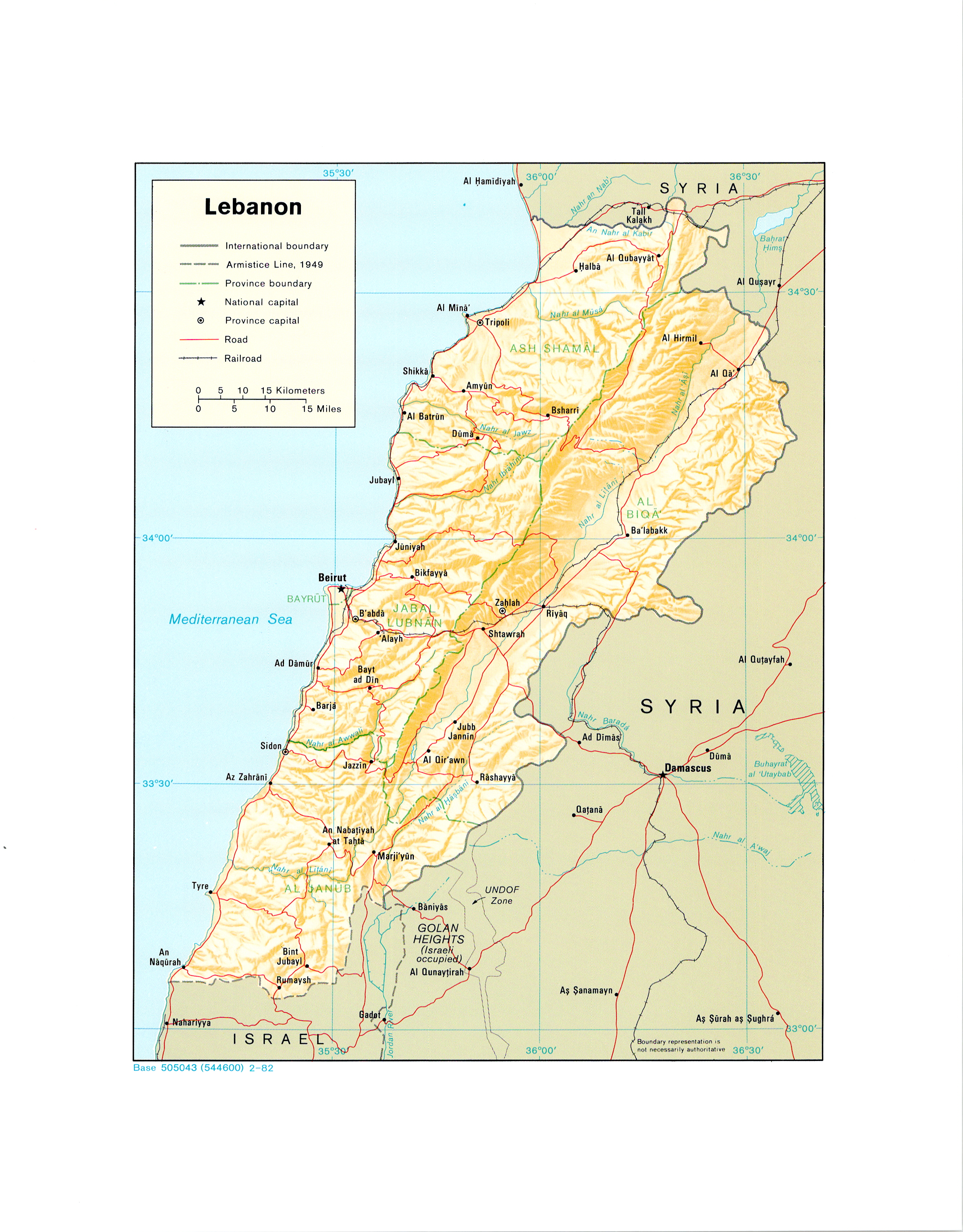
- Map of Lebanon
- Date: 27 March 2007
- Meeting no.: 5,648
- Code: S/RES/1748 (Document)
- Subject: The situation in the Middle East
- Voting summary: 15 voted for; None voted against; None abstained
- Result: Adopted

Security Council composition
- Permanent members: China; France; Russia; United Kingdom; United States
- Non-permanent members: Belgium; Rep. of the Congo; Ghana; Indonesia; Italy; Panama; Peru; Qatar; Slovakia; South Africa

United Nations Security Council Resolution 1748 was unanimously adopted on 27 March 2007.

== Resolution ==
Affirming its willingness to continue to assist Lebanon in the search for the truth in the terrorist attack of 14 February 2005 that killed former Prime Minister Rafik Hariri and 22 others, the Security Council this morning extended, until 15 June 2008, the mandate of the International Independent Investigation Commission it created to investigate that attack.

The Council held a discussion on the most recent report of the International Independent Investigation Commission on 21 March (see Press Release SC/8973), during which Commissioner Serge Brammertz told the 15-nation body that significant progress was being made, not only on the 14 February attack, and that the Commission continued to provide technical assistance to the Lebanese authorities in 16 other cases, examining potential linkages with the Hariri case. Those cases included the assassination of Minister Pierre Gemayel and the bombing of two buses in Ain Alaq.

In unanimously adopting resolution 1748 (2007), the Council noted the Commission’s conclusion that it was unlikely that the Commission would complete its work before its current mandate expired. However, the Council declared its readiness to terminate the mandate earlier, if the Commission would report that it had completed its mandated tasks.

== See also ==
- List of United Nations Security Council Resolutions 1701 to 1800 (2006–2008)
