= United Nations Security Council Resolution 1759 =

UN Security Council Resolution 1759
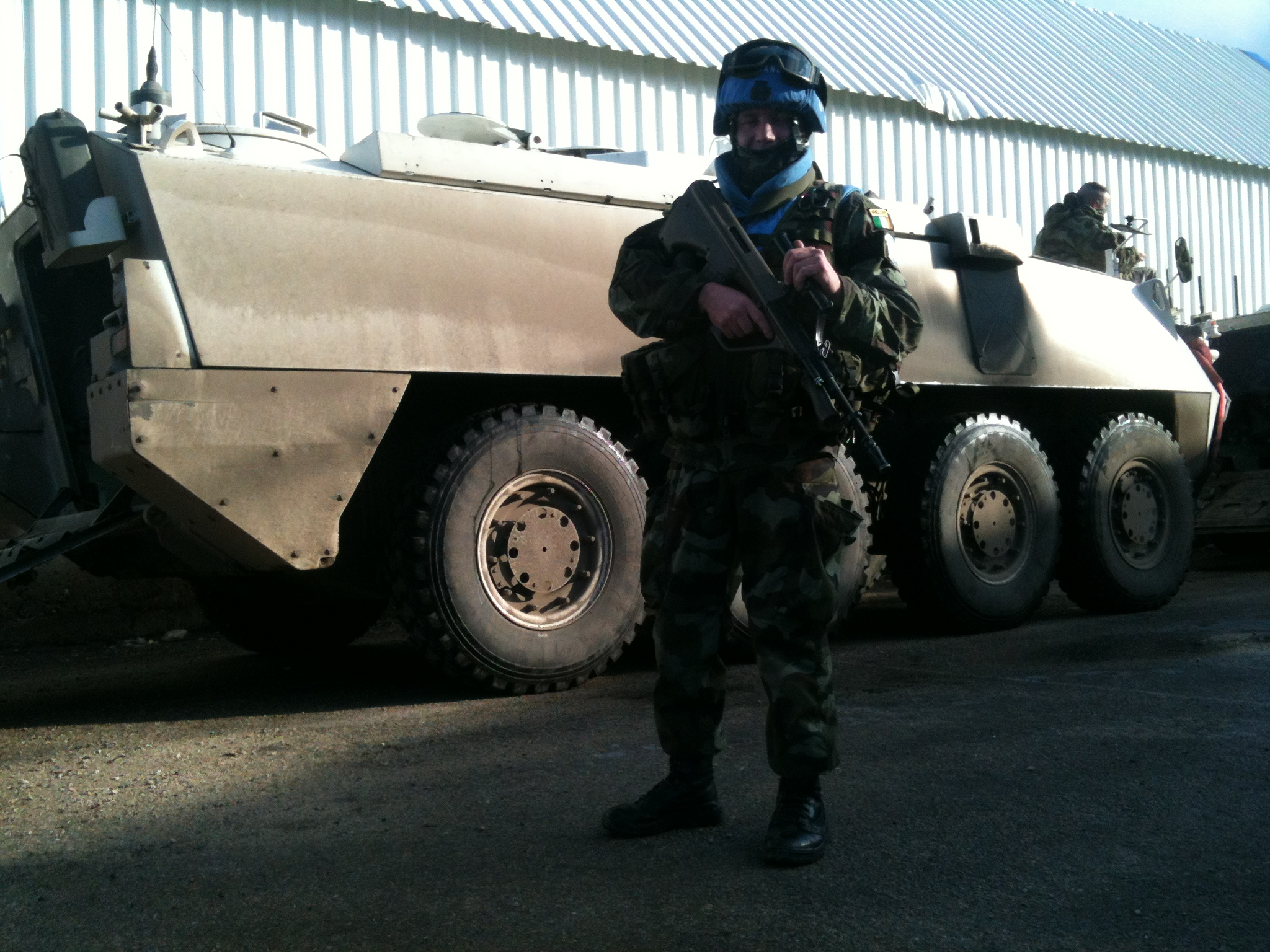
- UNDOF patrol
- Date: 20 June 2007
- Meeting no.: 5,698
- Code: S/RES/1759 (Document)
- Subject: The situation in the Middle East
- Voting summary: 15 voted for; None voted against; None abstained
- Result: Adopted

Security Council composition
- Permanent members: China; France; Russia; United Kingdom; United States
- Non-permanent members: Belgium; Rep. of the Congo; Ghana; Indonesia; Italy; Panama; Peru; Qatar; Slovakia; South Africa

United Nations Security Council Resolution 1759 was unanimously adopted on 20 June 2007.

== Resolution ==
The Security Council decided this morning to extend the mandate of the United Nations Disengagement Observer Force (UNDOF), which monitors the ceasefire between Israel and Syria on the Golan Heights, for six months, ending on 31 December 2007.

By its unanimous adoption of resolution 1759 (2007), the Council also reiterated the terms of its resolution 338 (1973), which calls on the two parties to pursue negotiations towards a lasting peace.

In a statement (document S/2007/PRST/20) complementing the resolution, Johan Verbeke (Belgium), Council President for June, quoted paragraph 11 of United Nations Secretary-General Ban Ki-moon’s latest report on UNDOF (document S/2007/331), which maintains that the Middle East is likely to remain tense until a comprehensive settlement covering all aspects of the problem can be reached.

== See also ==
- List of United Nations Security Council Resolutions 1701 to 1800 (2006–2008)
