= United Nations Security Council Resolution 1749 =

UN Security Council Resolution 1749
- Date: 28 March 2007
- Meeting no.: 5,650
- Code: S/RES/1749 (Document)
- Subject: The situation concerning Rwanda
- Voting summary: 15 voted for; None voted against; None abstained
- Result: Adopted

Security Council composition
- Permanent members: China; France; Russia; United Kingdom; United States
- Non-permanent members: Belgium; Rep. of the Congo; Ghana; Indonesia; Italy; Panama; Peru; Qatar; Slovakia; South Africa

United Nations Security Council Resolution 1749 was unanimously adopted on 28 March 2007.

== Resolution ==
Welcoming the positive developments in Rwanda and throughout the Great Lakes region, the Security Council today terminated a provision requiring States to notify a Council-mandated Committee of all arms exports to the African nation, a measure imposed 12 years ago in the wake of the tragic Rwandan genocide.

Acting under Chapter VII of the Charter, the Security Council unanimously adopted resolution 1749 (2007), deciding to immediately terminate measures set out originally in paragraph 11 of resolution 1011 (1995), which required States to notify of “all exports from their territories of arms or related materiel to Rwanda to the Committee established by resolution 918 (1994)”, and that “the Government of Rwanda shall mark and register and notify to the Committee all imports made by it of arms and related materiel”.

By the resolution, the Council welcomed the positive developments in Rwanda and the Great Lakes region, particularly the signing this past December in Nairobi, Kenya of a region-wide Pact on Security, Stability and Development at the Second Summit of the International Conference on the Great Lakes Region.

Encouraging the signatories to ratify that Pact as soon as possible and to provide for its expeditious implementation, the Security Council reiterated its call upon the States of the region to deepen further their cooperation with a view to consolidating peace, and stressed the need for those States to ensure that arms and related materiel delivered to them are not diverted to or used by illegal armed groups.

== See also ==
- List of United Nations Security Council Resolutions 1701 to 1800 (2006–2008)
