= United Nations Security Council Resolution 1726 =

UN Security Council Resolution 1726
- Côte d'Ivoire
- Date: 15 December 2006
- Meeting no.: 5,591
- Code: S/RES/1726 (Document)
- Subject: The situation in Côte d'Ivoire
- Voting summary: 15 voted for; None voted against; None abstained
- Result: Adopted

Security Council composition
- Permanent members: China; France; Russia; United Kingdom; United States
- Non-permanent members: Argentina; Rep. of the Congo; Denmark; Ghana; Greece; Japan; Peru; Qatar; Slovakia; Tanzania

United Nations Security Council Resolution 1726, adopted unanimously on December 15, 2006, after recalling previous resolutions on the situation in Côte d'Ivoire (Ivory Coast), the Council extended the mandate of the United Nations Operation in Côte d'Ivoire (UNOCI) and supporting French forces until January 10, 2007.

== Details ==
The Security Council was very concerned about the ongoing political crisis and its deterioration in Côte d'Ivoire, resulting in "grave" humanitarian consequences. It reaffirmed its support for UNOCI and the supporting French forces as part of Opération Licorne, and stated that the situation in the country continued to constitute a threat to international peace and security.

Acting under Chapter VII of the United Nations Charter, the Council extended the mandates of UNOCI and the French supporting forces in Opération Licorne until January 10, 2007.

== See also ==
- First Ivorian Civil War
- List of United Nations Security Council Resolutions 1701 to 1800 (2006–2008)
- Opération Licorne
