= United Nations Security Council Resolution 1794 =

UN Security Council Resolution 1794
- Date: 21 December 2007
- Meeting no.: 5,814
- Code: S/RES/1794 (Document)
- Subject: The situation concerning the Democratic Republic of the Congo
- Voting summary: 15 voted for; None voted against; None abstained
- Result: Adopted

Security Council composition
- Permanent members: China; France; Russia; United Kingdom; United States
- Non-permanent members: Belgium; Rep. of the Congo; Ghana; Indonesia; Italy; Panama; Peru; Qatar; Slovakia; South Africa

United Nations Security Council Resolution 1794 was unanimously adopted on 21 December 2007.

== Resolution ==
The Security Council today extended the mandate and capacity of the United Nations Organization Mission in the Democratic Republic of the Congo (MONUC) for one year, until 31 December 2008.

Unanimously adopting resolution 1794 (2007) and acting under Chapter VII of the United Nations’ Charter, the Council authorized the continuation until that date of up to 17,030 military personnel, 760 military observers, 391 police trainers and 750 personnel of formed police units and requested MONUC to attach the highest priority to addressing the crisis in the Kivus in all its dimensions.

The Council demanded that the militias and armed groups still present in the eastern part of the Congo, in particular the Forces Démocratiques de Libération du Rwanda (FDLR), ex-FAR/Interahamwe and the dissident militia of Laurent Nkunda, lay down their arms and engage voluntarily, without delay or preconditions, in their demobilization repatriation, resettlement and reintegration, stressing the need that those militias and armed groups do not receive any support.

The Council authorized MONUC to provide assistance to the Congolese authorities, including the National Independent Electoral Commission, in the organization, preparation and conduct of local elections.

By the text, MONUC was invited to assist the Government in its efforts to bring to justice those indicted by the International Criminal Tribunal for Rwanda and the International Criminal Court, and to undertake a thorough review of its efforts to prevent and responds to sexual violence.

Finally, the Council took note of the benchmarks presented by the Secretary-General for a future gradual drawdown of MONUC, as set out in his report (document S/2007/671) and encouraged MONUC to focus the activities of all its components on helping the Congolese authorities to achieve those benchmarks.

== See also ==
- List of United Nations Security Council Resolutions 1701 to 1800 (2006–2008)
