= United Nations Security Council Resolution 1768 =

UN Security Council Resolution 1768
- Date: 31 July 2007
- Meeting no.: 5,726
- Code: S/RES/1768 (Document)
- Subject: The situation concerning the Democratic Republic of the Congo
- Voting summary: 15 voted for; None voted against; None abstained
- Result: Adopted

Security Council composition
- Permanent members: China; France; Russia; United Kingdom; United States
- Non-permanent members: Belgium; Rep. of the Congo; Ghana; Indonesia; Italy; Panama; Peru; Qatar; Slovakia; South Africa

United Nations Security Council Resolution 1768 was unanimously adopted on 31 July 2007.

== Resolution ==
Once again condemning the illicit flow of weapons to the Democratic Republic of the Congo and reiterating its concern over militia activity in its eastern provinces, the Security Council this afternoon extended the arms embargo on that country, due to expire today, for another 10 days.

By the unanimous adoption of resolution 1768 (2007), the Council specified that the mechanisms it had established over the past several years to monitor and enforce the embargo be extended for the same period.

Those mechanisms include a travel ban and an assets freeze on persons determined to have violated the embargo, and a group of experts mandated to monitor violations through information provided by the United Nations Organization Mission in the Democratic Republic of the Congo (MONUC) and other means, and to recommend ways to strengthen the sanctions regime.

== See also ==
- List of United Nations Security Council Resolutions 1701 to 1800 (2006–2008)
