= United Nations Security Council Resolution 1751 =

UN Security Council Resolution 1751
- Date: 13 April 2007
- Meeting no.: 5,660
- Code: S/RES/1751 (Document)
- Subject: The situation concerning the Democratic Republic of the Congo
- Voting summary: 15 voted for; None voted against; None abstained
- Result: Adopted

Security Council composition
- Permanent members: China; France; Russia; United Kingdom; United States
- Non-permanent members: Belgium; Rep. of the Congo; Ghana; Indonesia; Italy; Panama; Peru; Qatar; Slovakia; South Africa

United Nations Security Council Resolution 1751 was unanimously adopted on 13 April 2007.

== Resolution ==
Acting under Chapter VII of the United Nations Charter this morning, the Security Council extended the mandate of the United Nations Organization Mission in the Democratic Republic of the Congo (MONUC) until 15 May 2007.

Taking that action by its unanimous adoption of resolution 1751 (2007), the Council noted that the situation in the Democratic Republic of the Congo continued to pose a threat to international peace and security in the region.

The Council reaffirmed its commitment to the sovereignty, territorial integrity and political independence of the Democratic Republic of the Congo, and to its continued contribution to the consolidation of the country's peace and stability in the post-transition period, in particular through MONUC.

== See also ==
- List of United Nations Security Council Resolutions 1701 to 1800 (2006–2008)
