= United Nations Security Council Resolution 1784 =

United Nations Security Council resolution

UN Security Council Resolution 1784
- Date: 31 October 2007
- Meeting no.: 5,774
- Code: S/RES/1784 (Document)
- Subject: Reports of the Secretary-General on the Sudan
- Voting summary: 15 voted for; None voted against; None abstained
- Result: Adopted

Security Council composition
- Permanent members: China; France; Russia; United Kingdom; United States
- Non-permanent members: Belgium; Rep. of the Congo; Ghana; Indonesia; Italy; Panama; Peru; Qatar; Slovakia; South Africa

United Nations Security Council Resolution 1784 was unanimously adopted on 31 October 2007.

== Resolution ==
Urging that the parties in southern Sudan finalize the redeployment of forces, the demarcation of borders and other overdue commitments of their Comprehensive Peace Agreement, the Security Council this afternoon extended the mandate of the United Nations Mission in the Sudan (UNMIS) for six months until 30 April 2008.

Through resolution 1784 (2007), proposed by the United States and adopted unanimously by the 15-member body, the Council conveyed its intention to extend the Mission for further periods after an assessment, requested from the Secretary-General, is conducted on whether any changes were needed in the UNMIS mandate to strengthen the Mission’s ability to facilitate full implementation of the Peace Agreement.

For now, the Council urged the Mission to pay particular attention to the redeployment of forces and the lessening of tensions in the areas of Unity, Upper Nile, South Kordofan, Abyei and Blue Nile, calling on the parties to take steps to reduce tensions in Abyei and to allow UNMIS access to all those areas.

It called on donors to support disarmament, demobilization and reintegration initiatives, along with the Joint Integrated Units that were meant to include both Government troops and those of the former rebels, in order to help reduce tensions.

The Council affirmed the Mission’s role in facilitating support of the United Nations for the African Union Mission in Sudan (AMIS) in the Darfur region, as well as the deployment, in that region, of the hybrid mission to be known as the African Union-United Nations Hybrid Operation in Darfur (UNAMID).

== See also ==
- List of United Nations Security Council Resolutions 1701 to 1800 (2006–2008)
