= United Nations Security Council Resolution 1788 =

UN Security Council Resolution 1788
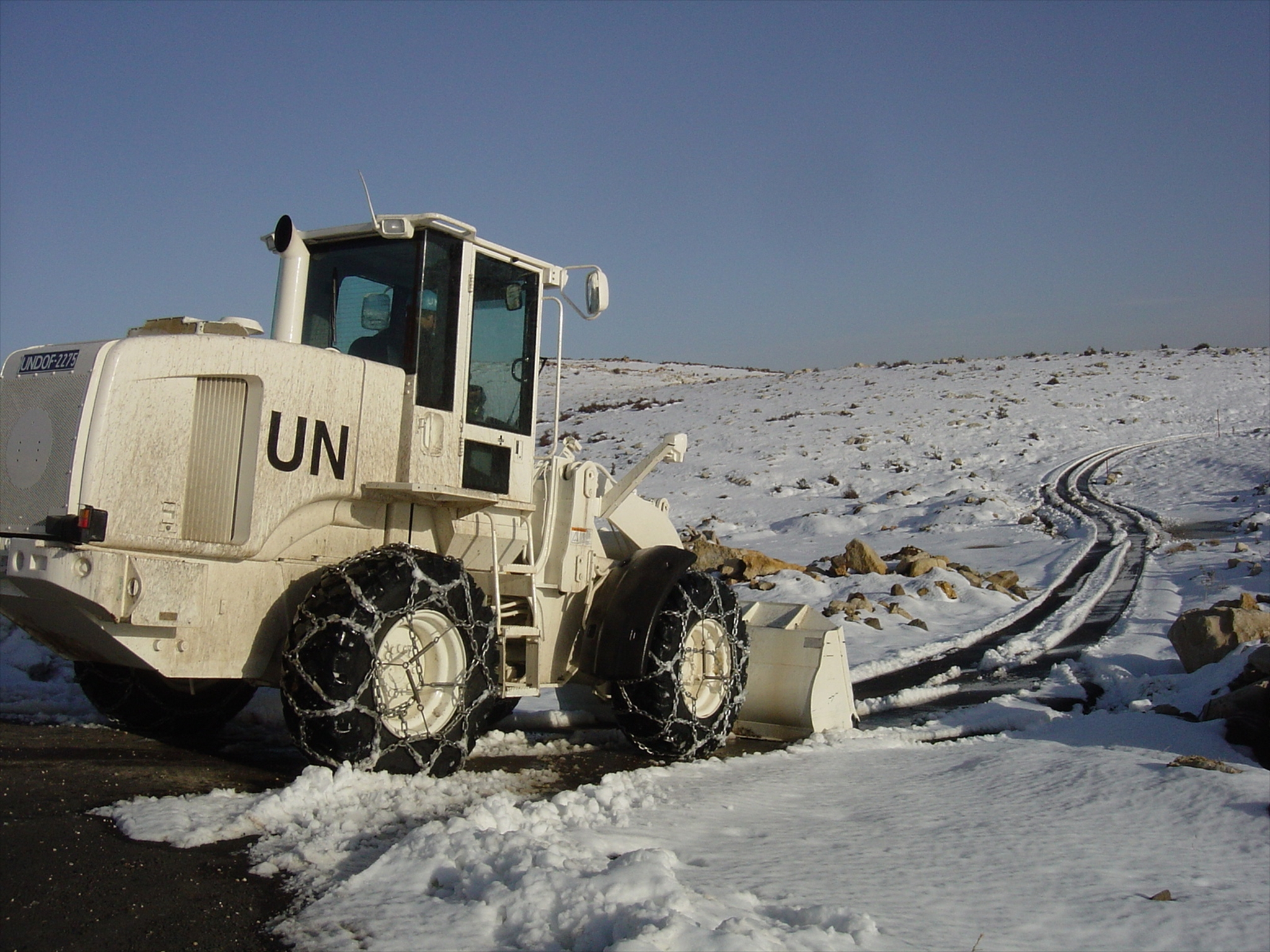
- United Nations Disengagement Observer Force
- Date: 14 December 2007
- Meeting no.: 5,802
- Code: S/RES/1788 (Document)
- Subject: The situation in the Middle East
- Voting summary: 15 voted for; None voted against; None abstained
- Result: Adopted

Security Council composition
- Permanent members: China; France; Russia; United Kingdom; United States
- Non-permanent members: Belgium; Rep. of the Congo; Ghana; Indonesia; Italy; Panama; Peru; Qatar; Slovakia; South Africa

United Nations Security Council Resolution 1788 was unanimously adopted on 14 December 2007.

== Resolution ==
The Security Council this morning renewed the mandate of the United Nations Disengagement Observer Force (UNDOF), which has supervised the ceasefire between Israel and Syria since 1974, until 30 June 2008.

Unanimously adopting resolution 1788 (2007), the Council called on the parties concerned to immediately implement its resolution 338 (1973) of 22 October 1973. By that text, the Council decided that negotiations should start between the parties with the aim of establishing a just and lasting peace in the Middle East.

In a statement read out by Council President Aldo Mantovani (Italy), the Council declared that it shared the view expressed in the Secretary-General’s report on UNDOF (document S/2007/698) that the situation in the Middle East was tense and was likely to remain so, unless and until a comprehensive settlement covering all aspects of the Middle East problem could be reached.

== See also ==
- List of United Nations Security Council Resolutions 1701 to 1800 (2006–2008)
