= United Nations Security Council Resolution 1763 =

UN Security Council Resolution 1763
- Date: 29 June 2007
- Meeting no.: 5,711
- Code: S/RES/1763 (Document)
- Subject: The situation in Côte d’Ivoire
- Voting summary: 15 voted for; None voted against; None abstained
- Result: Adopted

Security Council composition
- Permanent members: China; France; Russia; United Kingdom; United States
- Non-permanent members: Belgium; Rep. of the Congo; Ghana; Indonesia; Italy; Panama; Peru; Qatar; Slovakia; South Africa

United Nations Security Council Resolution 1763 was unanimously adopted on 29 June 2007.

== Resolution ==
The Security Council today extended the mandate of the United Nations Operation in Côte d’Ivoire (UNOCI) until 16 July 2007, and reaffirmed its support for the peace and electoral processes in the divided West African country.

Acting under Chapter VII of the United Nations Charter, the Council unanimously adopted resolution 1763 (2007), by which it also decided to extend the mandate of the French forces supporting the mission.

United Nations Secretary-General Ban Ki-moon’s latest report on the situation in Côte d’Ivoire recommends that the mission maintain its current strength at least until the zone of confidence separating Government and rebel forces has been successfully replaced with a green line monitored by UNOCI observation posts.

He describes agreements signed by the parties in March as a “turning point” in the crisis that has kept Côte d’Ivoire divided since 2002 into the Government-controlled south and the Forces nouvelles-held north. The report emphasizes, however, that many fundamental issues remain unresolved.

== See also ==
- List of United Nations Security Council Resolutions 1701 to 1800 (2006–2008)
