= United Nations Security Council Resolution 1733 =

UN Security Council Resolution 1733
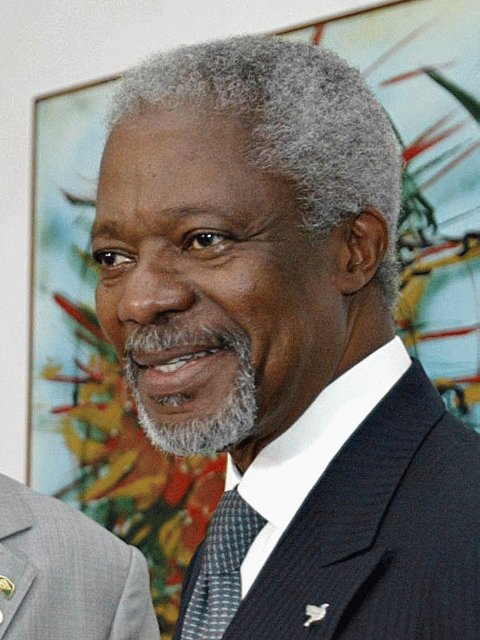
- Kofi Annan
- Date: 22 December 2006
- Meeting no.: 5,607
- Code: S/RES/1733 (Document)
- Subject: Tribute to outgoing Secretary-General
- Result: Adopted

Security Council composition
- Permanent members: China; France; Russia; United Kingdom; United States
- Non-permanent members: Argentina; Rep. of the Congo; Denmark; Ghana; Greece; Japan; Peru; Qatar; Slovakia; Tanzania

United Nations Security Council Resolution 1733, adopted by acclamation at a closed meeting on December 22, 2006, after recognising the role of the Secretary-General of the United Nations, the Council paid tribute to Kofi Annan, whose term as Secretary-General would come to an end on December 31, 2006.

Ban Ki-moon would succeed Annan as Secretary-General from January 1, 2007.

== Details ==
The Council praised Annan for guiding the United Nations under the United Nations Charter, his attempts to find durable solutions to conflicts around the world and to undertake reforms at the organisation.

It acknowledged the contributions of Annan to international peace, security and development, attempts to solve international problems in economic, social and cultural fields and efforts to promote humanitarian needs, human rights and freedoms for all people.

Finally, the resolution expressed "deep appreciation" to Kofi Annan for dedicating himself to the principles contained in the United Nations Charter and to the development of friendly relations among states.

== See also ==
- List of United Nations Security Council Resolutions 1701 to 1800 (2006–2008)
