= United Nations Security Council Resolution 1781 =

UN Security Council Resolution 1781
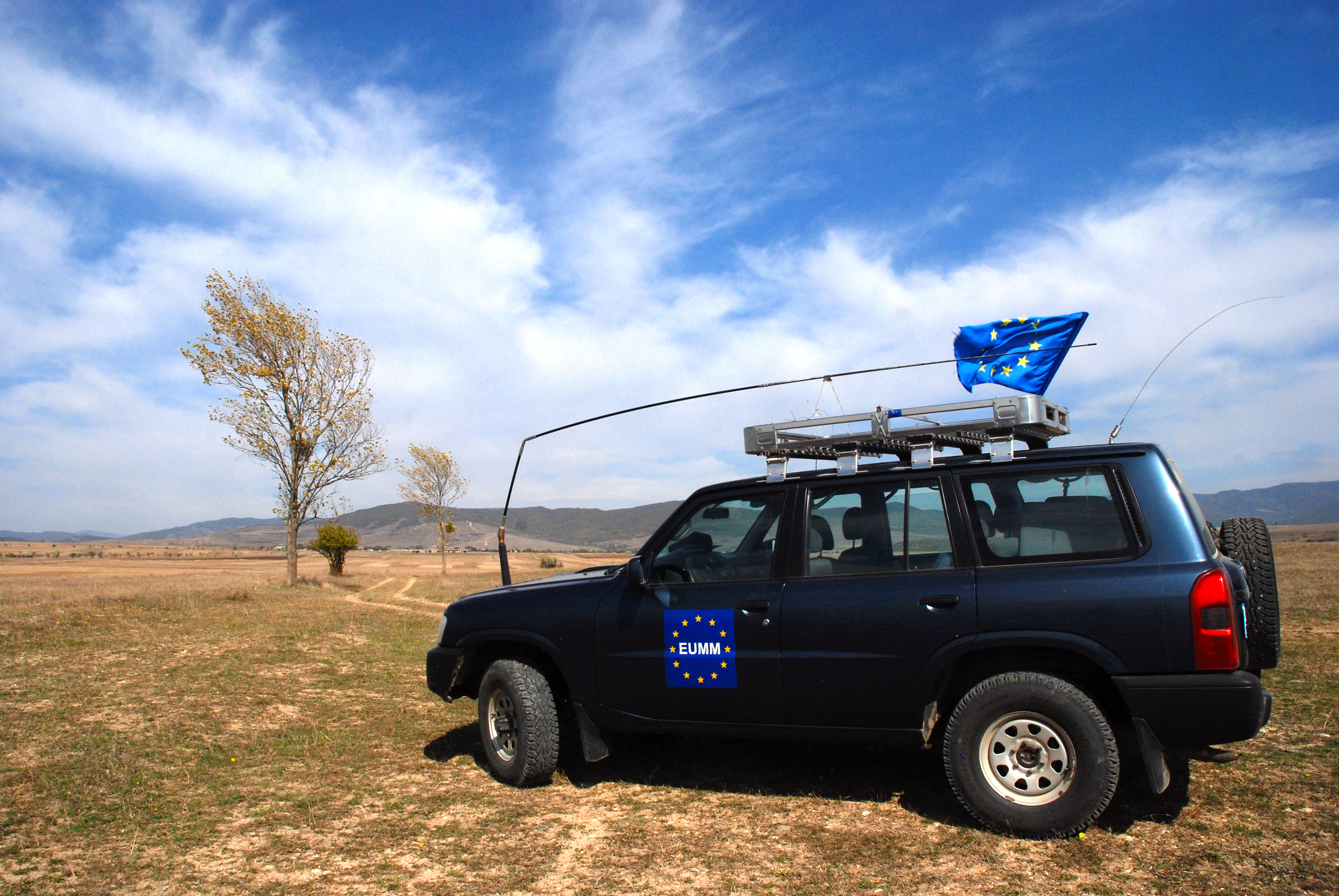
- European Union Monitoring Mission patrol vehicle in Georgia
- Date: 15 October 2007
- Meeting no.: 5759
- Code: S/RES/1781 (Document)
- Subject: United Nations Observer Mission in Georgia (UNOMIG)
- Voting summary: 15 voted for; None voted against; None abstained
- Result: Adopted

Security Council composition
- Permanent members: China; France; Russia; United Kingdom; United States
- Non-permanent members: Belgium; Rep. of the Congo; Ghana; Indonesia; Italy; Panama; Peru; Qatar; Slovakia; South Africa

United Nations Security Council Resolution 1781 was unanimously adopted on 15 October 2007. The resolution extended the mandate of the United Nations Observer Mission in Georgia (UNOMIG), which was to expire 15 October 2007, the day of the vote, until 15 April 2008. Furthermore, it "strongly urges all parties to consider and address seriously each other’s legitimate security concerns, to refrain from any acts of violence and provocation, including political action or rhetoric, and to comply fully with previous agreements regarding ceasefire and non-use of violence."
