= United Nations Security Council Resolution 1600 =

UN Security Council Resolution 1600
- House of Representatives in Yamoussoukro, Côte d'Ivoire
- Date: 4 May 2005
- Meeting no.: 5,173
- Code: S/RES/1600 (Document)
- Subject: The situation in Côte d'Ivoire
- Voting summary: 15 voted for; None voted against; None abstained
- Result: Adopted

Security Council composition
- Permanent members: China; France; Russia; United Kingdom; United States
- Non-permanent members: Algeria; Argentina; Benin; Brazil; Denmark; Greece; Japan; Philippines; Romania; Tanzania

United Nations Security Council resolution 1600, adopted unanimously on 4 May 2005, after recalling previous resolutions on the situation in Côte d'Ivoire (Ivory Coast), particularly resolutions 1528 (2004), 1572 (2004), 1584 (2005) and 1594 (2005), the council extended the mandate of the United Nations Operation in Côte d'Ivoire (UNOCI) until 4 June 2005.

The security council reaffirmed its support for the Linas-Marcoussis Agreement and its full implementation. It commended the African Union, Economic Community of West African States (ECOWAS) and French forces for their efforts to promote a peaceful settlement in Côte d'Ivoire, but noted existing challenges to the stability of the country and its threat to international peace and security in the region.

Acting under Chapter VII of the United Nations Charter, the mandate of MINUCI was extended along with authorisation given to ECOWAS and French forces operating in the country for one month. The Ivorian parties were urged to work towards a lasting solution to the crisis, particularly through mediation led by the African Union by former South African President Thabo Mbeki, which was praised by the council.

Finally, the council welcomed the announcement made by the Ivorian President Laurent Gbagbo that all candidates selected by parties to the Linas-Marcoussis Agreement would be eligible for the presidency.

== See also ==
- Ivorian Civil War
- List of United Nations Security Council Resolutions 1501 to 1600 (2003–2005)
- United Nations Operation in Côte d'Ivoire
