= United Nations Security Council Resolution 1527 =

UN Security Council Resolution 1527
- Côte d'Ivoire
- Date: 4 February 2004
- Meeting no.: 4,909
- Code: S/RES/1527 (Document)
- Subject: The situation in Côte d'Ivoire
- Voting summary: 15 voted for; None voted against; None abstained
- Result: Adopted

Security Council composition
- Permanent members: China; France; Russia; United Kingdom; United States
- Non-permanent members: Algeria; Angola; Benin; Brazil; Chile; Germany; Pakistan; Philippines; Romania; Spain

United Nations Security Council resolution 1527, adopted unanimously on 4 February 2004, after recalling previous resolutions on the situation in Côte d'Ivoire (Ivory Coast), particularly resolutions 1464 (2003), 1498 (2003) and 1514 (2003), the council extended the mandate of the United Nations Mission in Côte d'Ivoire (MINUCI) until 27 February 2004.

The Security Council reaffirmed its support for the Linas-Marcoussis Agreement and its full implementation. It commended the Economic Community of West African States (ECOWAS) and French forces for their efforts to promote a peaceful settlement in Côte d'Ivoire, but noted existing challenges to the stability of the country.

Under Chapter VII of the United Nations Charter, the mandate of MINUCI was extended along with authorisation given to ECOWAS and French forces operating in the country. Meanwhile, the Secretary-General Kofi Annan was requested to prepare for the deployment of a peacekeeping mission in Côte d'Ivoire within five weeks following a decision by the council.

== See also ==
- Ivorian Civil War
- List of United Nations Security Council Resolutions 1501 to 1600 (2003–2005)
- United Nations Operation in Côte d'Ivoire
