= United Nations Security Council Resolution 1598 =

UN Security Council Resolution 1598
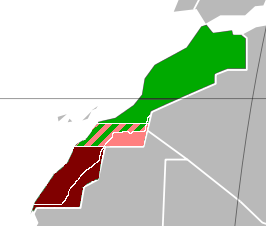
- Western Sahara (brown), Morocco (green) and disputed areas
- Date: 28 April 2005
- Meeting no.: 5,170
- Code: S/RES/1598 (Document)
- Subject: The situation concerning Western Sahara
- Voting summary: 15 voted for; None voted against; None abstained
- Result: Adopted

Security Council composition
- Permanent members: China; France; Russia; United Kingdom; United States
- Non-permanent members: Algeria; Argentina; Benin; Brazil; Denmark; Greece; Japan; Philippines; Romania; Tanzania

United Nations Security Council resolution 1598, adopted unanimously on 28 April 2005, after recalling all previous resolutions on the situation in Western Sahara, including resolutions 1495 (2003), 1541 (2004) and 1570 (2004), the Council extended the mandate of the United Nations Mission for the Referendum in Western Sahara (MINURSO) until 31 October 2005.

The Security Council reaffirmed the need for a durable and mutual solution to the Western Sahara problem, which would provide for the self-determination of the people of the territory. Both Morocco and the Polisario Front were urged to co-operate with the United Nations to end the political impasse and reach a solution to the long-running dispute. The Polisario Front was further called upon to release all prisoners of war in accordance with international humanitarian law while it, along with Morocco, had to co-operate with the International Committee of the Red Cross to determine the fate of missing persons. All military agreements concluded with MINURSO had to be respected.

Meanwhile, the Secretary-General Kofi Annan was requested to report on the situation and MINURSO, including a review of its structure. Member States were called upon to consider contributing towards confidence-building measures to facilitate greater person-to-person contact, such as family visits.

== See also ==
- Baker Plan
- Free Zone (region)
- Political status of Western Sahara
- List of United Nations Security Council Resolutions 1501 to 1600 (2003–2005)
- Moroccan Wall
- Sahrawi Arab Democratic Republic
