= United Nations Security Council Resolution 1579 =

UN Security Council Resolution 1579
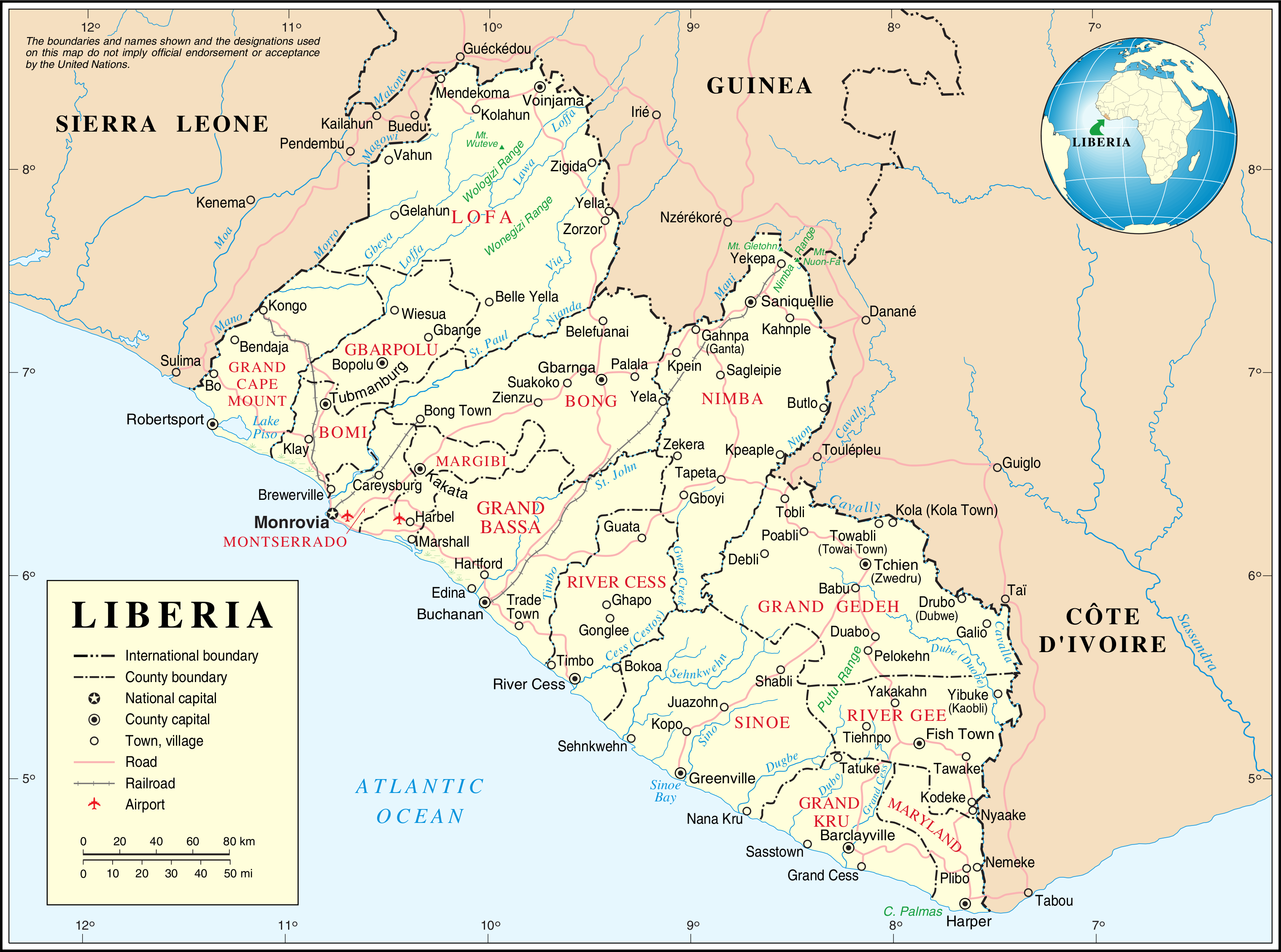
- Liberia
- Date: 21 December 2004
- Meeting no.: 5,105
- Code: S/RES/1579 (Document)
- Subject: The situation in Liberia
- Voting summary: 15 voted for; None voted against; None abstained
- Result: Adopted

Security Council composition
- Permanent members: China; France; Russia; United Kingdom; United States
- Non-permanent members: Algeria; Angola; Benin; Brazil; Chile; Germany; Pakistan; Philippines; Romania; Spain

United Nations Security Council resolution 1579, adopted unanimously on 21 December 2004, after recalling all previous resolutions on the situation in Liberia, the Council extended arms, timber and travel sanctions against the country for twelve months and a diamond ban for six months.

== Resolution ==
=== Observations ===
The Security Council recognised the link between the illegal exploitation of resources such as diamonds and timber, illicit arms trafficking and the conflicts in West Africa, particularly in Liberia. In this regard, it noted that measures imposed in Resolution 1521 (2003) were intended to stop fueling the conflict.

The preamble of the resolution also expressed concern that former President Charles Taylor and close associates were engaging in activities that were undermining peace and stability in the region. It noted the completion of the disarmament and demobilisation processes, respect for the ceasefire, and implementation of a peace agreement. There was concern that the transitional government had limited control over the timber-producing areas of the country.

=== Acts ===
Acting under Chapter VII of the United Nations Charter, the Council decided to renew sanctions against Liberia relating to arms, timber, diamonds and travel, while reiterating that it would lift the measures once the transitional government had met its conditions, including establishing a certificate of origin regime. Financial sanctions against Charles Taylor imposed in Resolution 1532 (2004) would remain in place and all states were reminded to implement all sanctions.

Meanwhile, a five-member expert panel appointed pursuant to Resolution 1549 (2004) by the Secretary-General Kofi Annan was re-established until 21 June 2005, to monitor the implementation and impact of the sanctions. The panel would report on whether Liberia had met the conditions for the lifting of the sanctions. In a similar manner, the Secretary-General would also report on progress made towards lifting the sanctions through consultations with the transitional government, UNMIL and Economic Community of West African States.

== See also ==
- List of United Nations Security Council Resolutions 1501 to 1600 (2003–2005)
- Second Liberian Civil War
- United Nations Mission in Liberia
