= United Nations Security Council Resolution 1528 =

2004 resolution on Côte d'Ivoire

UN Security Council Resolution 1528
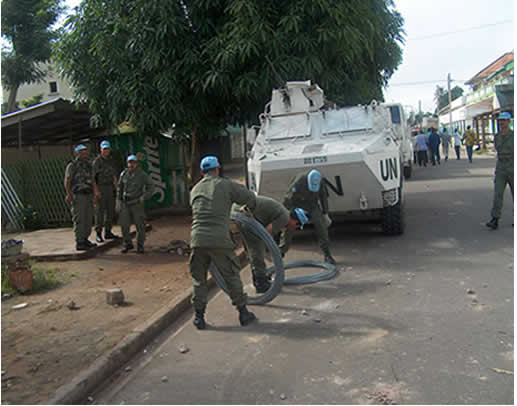
- UNOCI personnel
- Date: 27 February 2004
- Meeting no.: 4,918
- Code: S/RES/1528 (Document)
- Subject: The situation in Côte d'Ivoire
- Voting summary: 15 voted for; None voted against; None abstained
- Result: Adopted

Security Council composition
- Permanent members: China; France; Russia; United Kingdom; United States
- Non-permanent members: Algeria; Angola; Benin; Brazil; Chile; Germany; Pakistan; Philippines; Romania; Spain

United Nations Security Council resolution 1528, adopted unanimously on 27 February 2004, after recalling resolutions 1464 (2003), 1479 (2003), 1498 (2003), 1514 (2003) and 1527 (2004) on the situation in Côte d'Ivoire (Ivory Coast), the council established the United Nations Operation in Côte d'Ivoire (UNOCI) for an initial period of twelve months.

== Resolution ==
=== Observations ===
The Security Council endorsed the Linas-Marcoussis Agreement and welcomed progress relating to disarmament, demobilisation and reintegration (DDR), and the return of the Forces Nouvelles to the government, including dialogue. It called on all parties to refrain from violations of human rights and international humanitarian law and an end to impunity. There was concern over the deteriorating economic situation in the country and the consequences on the subregion.

The preamble of the resolution welcomed efforts by the African Union in supporting the peace and reconciliation process in Côte d'Ivoire, including those of the Economic Community of West African States (ECOWAS) and French forces. It noted requests by the President of Côte d'Ivoire Laurent Gbagbo and ECOWAS to transform the United Nations Mission in Côte d'Ivoire (MINUCI) into a peacekeeping mission. Lasting stability in the country would depend on peace in the subregion according to the council, particularly in Liberia.

=== Acts ===
Acting under Chapter VII of the United Nations Charter, the council established UNOCI for an initial period of twelve months from 4 April 2004 compromising of 6,240 United Nations personnel including 200 military observers and 320 police in addition to a civilian, judiciary and corrections component. United Nations missions in West Africa were encouraged to provide support to UNOCI, while UNOCI was asked to co-operate with the United Nations Mission in Sierra Leone (UNAMSIL) and United Nations Mission in Liberia (UNMIL).

UNOCI's mandate would involve the monitoring of armed groups and the ceasefire; a disarmament, demobilisation, reintegration, repatriation and resettlement programme; protecting United Nations personnel and civilians; supporting the implementation of the peace process; promoting human rights; utilising a public information capacity and maintaining law and order. Furthermore, it was authorised to use all necessary means to fulfil its mandate and a Status of Forces Agreement was requested to be completed within 30 days.

The resolution stressed the importance of the full implementation of the Linas-Marcoussis Agreement and for the Ivorian parties to guarantee the safety and freedom of movement of UNOCI personnel. The government was urged to undertake and complete the DDR programme, disband armed groups, restructure the armed forces and security services and curb disruptive street protests. and support of the international community was called for in order to help the economic development of Côte d'Ivoire.

The mandate of the ECOWAS and French forces operating in the country was extended for a further twelve months, with France required to report on its mandate. Finally, the Secretary-General Kofi Annan asked to keep the council informed on the situation in Côte d'Ivoire.

== See also ==
- 2004 French–Ivorian clashes
- Ivorian Civil War
- List of United Nations Security Council Resolutions 1501 to 1600 (2003–2005)
- Opération Licorne
- Second Liberian Civil War
