= United Nations Security Council Resolution 1586 =

UN Security Council Resolution 1586
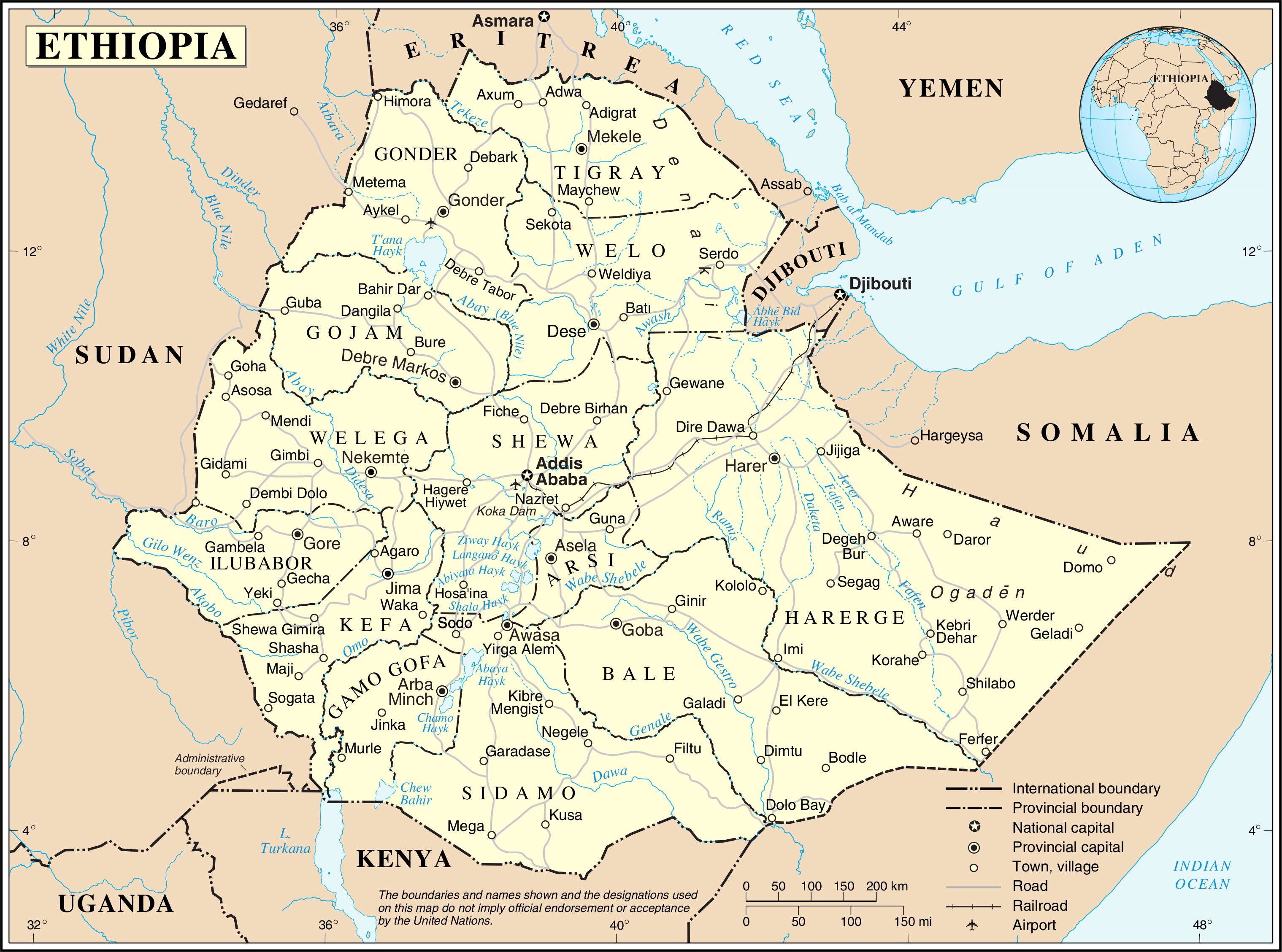
- Ethiopia
- Date: 14 March 2005
- Meeting no.: 5,139
- Code: S/RES/1586 (Document)
- Subject: The situation between Eritrea and Ethiopia
- Voting summary: 15 voted for; None voted against; None abstained
- Result: Adopted

Security Council composition
- Permanent members: China; France; Russia; United Kingdom; United States
- Non-permanent members: Algeria; Argentina; Benin; Brazil; Denmark; Greece; Japan; Philippines; Romania; Tanzania

United Nations Security Council resolution 1586 is a United Nation Security Council resolution adopted unanimously on 14 March 2005. After reaffirming all resolutions on the situation between Eritrea and Ethiopia, particularly Resolution 1560 (2004), the Council extended the mandate of the United Nations Mission in Ethiopia and Eritrea (UNMEE) until 15 September 2005.

== Resolution ==
=== Observations ===
The security council reaffirmed its support for the peace process between the two countries and of the role played by UNMEE in facilitating the implementation of the Algiers Agreement and decision by the Boundary Commission on the mutual border. It expressed concern at the impasse in the peace process and delays in the demarcation of the mutual border, particularly as the Boundary Commission was closing its offices. There was concern that the commission could not conduct its work and the lack of co-operation from both Ethiopia and Eritrea with the United Nations in this regard.

Furthermore, the council welcomed that UNMEE had been able to retain the integrity of the Temporary Security Zone (TSZ) but expressed concern at the build-up of Ethiopian troops in areas adjacent to the TSZ.

=== Acts ===
The resolution extended UNMEE's mandate until 15 September 2005. Both parties were urged to fulfil their commitments under the Algiers Agreement and co-operate with the Boundary Commission in order for it to fulfil its mandate. The parties were further called upon to co-operate with UNMEE and protect United Nations personnel, and refrain from increasing troops in areas adjacent to the TSZ. There was concern at the worsening humanitarian situation in both Ethiopia and Eritrea.

The council reaffirmed the importance of dialogue between the two countries and the normalisation of their diplomatic relations. Meanwhile, it supported the efforts of the Special Envoy Lloyd Axworthy to secure the implementation of their agreements. The Secretary-General Kofi Annan to closely monitor the situation and review UNMEE's mandate in light of any progress in the peace process.

== See also ==
- Badme
- Eritrean–Ethiopian War
- List of United Nations Security Council Resolutions 1501 to 1600 (2003–2005)
