= United Nations Security Council Resolution 1568 =

UN Security Council Resolution 1568
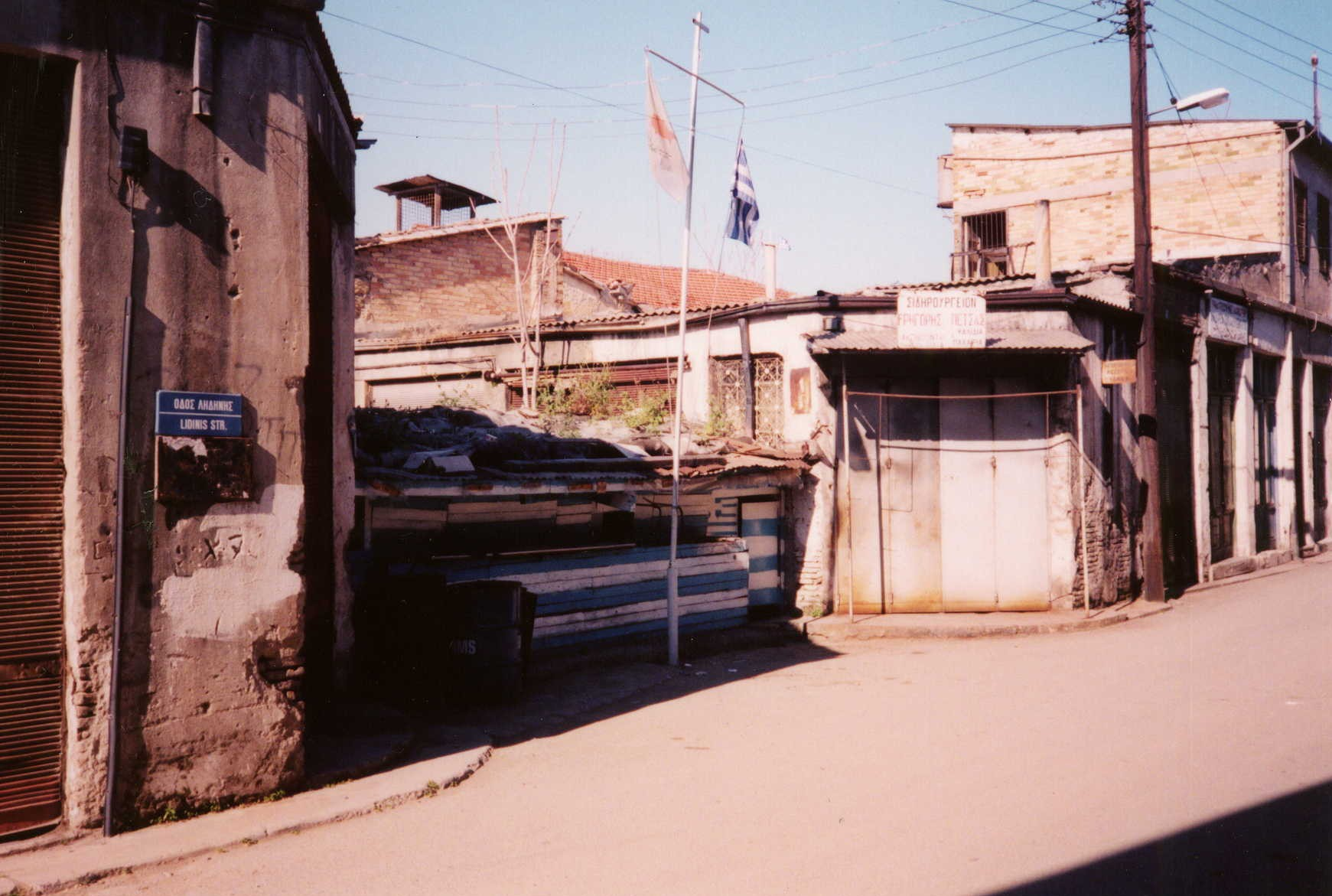
- The Green Line in Nicosia
- Date: 22 October 2004
- Meeting no.: 5,061
- Code: S/RES/1568 (Document)
- Subject: The situation in Cyprus
- Voting summary: 15 voted for; None voted against; None abstained
- Result: Adopted

Security Council composition
- Permanent members: China; France; Russia; United Kingdom; United States
- Non-permanent members: Algeria; Angola; Benin; Brazil; Chile; Germany; Pakistan; Philippines; Romania; Spain

United Nations Security Council resolution 1568, adopted unanimously on 22 October 2004, after reaffirming all resolutions on the situation in Cyprus, particularly Resolution 1251 (1999), the council extended the mandate of the United Nations Peacekeeping Force in Cyprus (UNFICYP) for an additional period until 15 June 2005.

The security council called on both Cyprus and Northern Cyprus to urgently address the humanitarian issue of missing persons. It welcomed the Secretary-General Kofi Annan's review of UNFICYP as requested in Resolution 1548 (2004) and his assessment that violence on the island was increasingly unlikely. The Secretary-General would conduct a further review of the United Nations operation in Cyprus based on developments on the ground and the views of the parties concerned.

Extending UNFICYP's mandate, the resolution requested the Secretary-General to report to the council on the implementation of the current resolution, further endorsing his amendments to the concept of operations and force level of UNFICYP by reducing troop levels and slightly increasing the number of police. It urged the Turkish Cypriot side to restore the military status quo at Strovilia prior to 30 June 2000 and called for an end to restrictions imposed on UNFICYP operations.

== See also ==
- Annan Plan
- Annan Plan referendum
- Cyprus dispute
- List of United Nations Security Council Resolutions 1501 to 1600 (2003–2005)
- United Nations Buffer Zone in Cyprus
- Turkish invasion of Cyprus
