= United Nations Security Council Resolution 1561 =

UN Security Council Resolution 1561
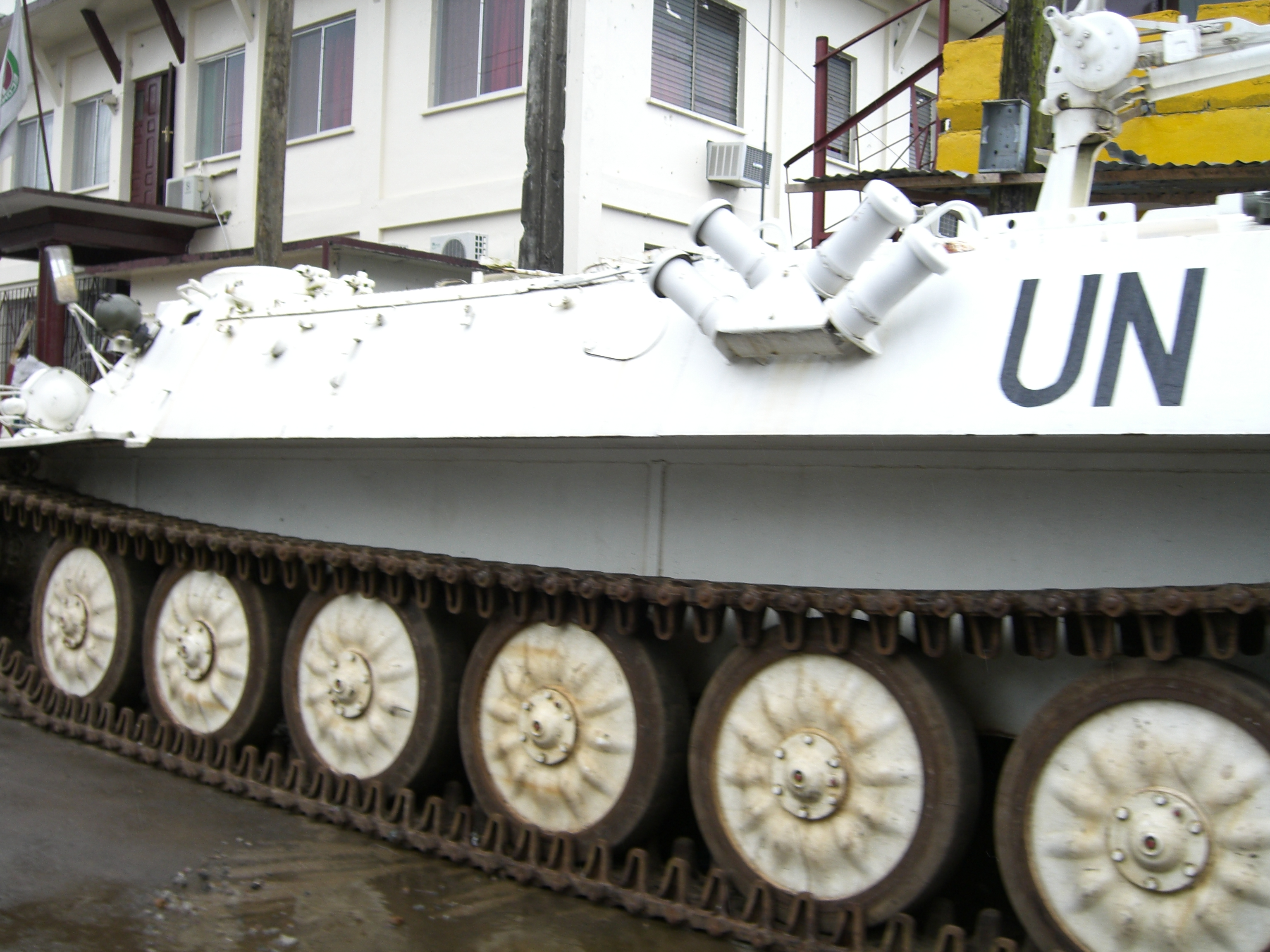
- UNMIL unit in Liberia
- Date: 17 September 2004
- Meeting no.: 5,036
- Code: S/RES/1561 (Document)
- Subject: The situation in Liberia
- Voting summary: 15 voted for; None voted against; None abstained
- Result: Adopted

Security Council composition
- Permanent members: China; France; Russia; United Kingdom; United States
- Non-permanent members: Algeria; Angola; Benin; Brazil; Chile; Germany; Pakistan; Philippines; Romania; Spain

United Nations Security Council resolution 1561 was adopted unanimously on 17 September 2004, after recalling all previous resolutions on the situation in Liberia, particularly resolutions 1497 (2003), 1503 (2003), 1521 (2003) and 1532 (2004). The Council extended the mandate of the United Nations Mission in Liberia (UNMIL) for a further year until 19 September 2005.

The Security Council recognised the important role that the Economic Community of West African States (ECOWAS) was playing in the Liberian process in addition to that of the African Union and United Nations. There had also been substantial progress with regard to disarmament in the disarmament, demobilisation, reintegration and rehabilitation process.

Liberian parties were called upon to commit themselves to the peace process and to ensure the holding of free, fair and transparent general elections by October 2005. Meanwhile, the international community was asked to fulfil pledges made at the International Reconstruction Conference on Liberia in February 2004 and make funds available for the reintegration and rehabilitation process. Finally, the Secretary-General Kofi Annan to report on progress made by UNMIL in the fulfilment of its mandate.

== See also ==
- List of United Nations Security Council Resolutions 1501 to 1600 (2003–2005)
- Second Liberian Civil War
