= United Nations Security Council Resolution 1570 =

UN Security Council Resolution 1570
- Western Sahara
- Date: 28 October 2004
- Meeting no.: 5,068
- Code: S/RES/1570 (Document)
- Subject: The situation concerning Western Sahara
- Voting summary: 15 voted for; None voted against; None abstained
- Result: Adopted

Security Council composition
- Permanent members: China; France; Russia; United Kingdom; United States
- Non-permanent members: Algeria; Angola; Benin; Brazil; Chile; Germany; Pakistan; Philippines; Romania; Spain

United Nations Security Council resolution 1570, adopted unanimously on 28 October 2004, after recalling all previous resolutions on the situation in Western Sahara, particularly resolutions 1495 (2003) and 1541 (2004), the Council extended the mandate of the United Nations Mission for the Referendum in Western Sahara (MINURSO) until 30 April 2005.

The Security Council reaffirmed the need for a durable and mutual solution to the Western Sahara problem, which would provide for the self-determination of the people of the territory. Both Morocco and the Polisario Front were urged to co-operate with the United Nations to end the political impasse and reach a solution to the long-running dispute.

Meanwhile, the Secretary-General Kofi Annan was requested to report on the situation and MINURSO, including a possible reduction of its staff. Member States were called upon to consider contributing towards confidence-building measures to facilitate greater person-to-person contact, such as family visits.

In his report, the Secretary-General offered two options for the Security Council's consideration: either maintaining 203 observers monitoring a ceasefire line or a reduction of up to 37 of them.

== See also ==
- Baker Plan
- Free Zone (region)
- Political status of Western Sahara
- List of United Nations Security Council Resolutions 1501 to 1600 (2003–2005)
- Sahrawi Arab Democratic Republic
- Moroccan Western Sahara Wall
