= United Nations Security Council Resolution 1520 =

UN Security Council Resolution 1520
- UNDOF ribbon bar
- Date: 22 December 2003
- Meeting no.: 4,889
- Code: S/RES/1520 (Document)
- Subject: The situation in the Middle East
- Voting summary: 15 voted for; None voted against; None abstained
- Result: Adopted

Security Council composition
- Permanent members: China; France; Russia; United Kingdom; United States
- Non-permanent members: Angola; Bulgaria; Chile; Cameroon; Germany; Guinea; Mexico; Pakistan; Spain; Syria

United Nations Security Council Resolution 1520, adopted unanimously on 22 December 2003 after considering a report by the Secretary-General Kofi Annan regarding the United Nations Disengagement Observer Force (UNDOF), extended the Council's mandate for a further six months until 30 June 2004.

The Resolution called upon the parties concerned to immediately implement Resolution 338 (1973) and requested that the Secretary-General submit a report on the situation at the end of that period.

The Secretary-General's report pursuant to the previous resolution on UNDOF said that the situation between Israel and Syria had remained generally calm, though the situation in the Middle East as a whole remained dangerous until a settlement could be reached. He also reported that the area was tense since an Israeli air strike on 5 October 2003, which he condemned.

== See also ==
- Arab–Israeli conflict
- Golan Heights
- Israel–Syria relations
- List of United Nations Security Council Resolutions 1501 to 1600 (2003–2005)
- 2000–2006 Shebaa Farms conflict
