= United Nations Security Council Resolution 1514 =

UN Security Council Resolution 1514
- Flag of Côte d'Ivoire
- Date: 13 November 2003
- Meeting no.: 4,857
- Code: S/RES/1514 (Document)
- Subject: The situation in Côte d'Ivoire
- Voting summary: 15 voted for; None voted against; None abstained
- Result: Adopted

Security Council composition
- Permanent members: China; France; Russia; United Kingdom; United States
- Non-permanent members: Angola; Bulgaria; Chile; Cameroon; Germany; Guinea; Mexico; Pakistan; Spain; Syria

United Nations Security Council resolution 1514, adopted unanimously on 13 November 2003, after reaffirming Resolution 1479 (2003) on the situation in Côte d'Ivoire (Ivory Coast) and resolutions 1464 (2003) and 1498 (2003), extended the mandate of the United Nations Mission in Côte d'Ivoire (MINUCI) until 4 February 2004.

The Security Council reaffirmed the Linas-Marcoussis Agreement and its opposition to attempts to achieve power through unconstitutional means. It stressed the need for all Ivorian parties to participate in the Government of National Reconciliation, resume effective authority throughout the country, and make commitments towards the disarmament, demobilisation, and reintegration programme of former combatants and the restructuring of the armed forces. As with previous resolutions, the council commended the Economic Community of West African States (ECOWAS) and French forces for their efforts to promote a peaceful settlement in Côte d'Ivoire.

The Secretary-General, Kofi Annan, was asked to report to the council by 10 January 2004 on MINUCI's efforts to facilitate peace and stability in Côte d'Ivoire and on strengthening the United Nations presence in the country.

== See also ==
- Ivorian Civil War
- List of United Nations Security Council Resolutions 1501 to 1600 (2003–2005)
- Opération Licorne
