= United Nations Security Council Resolution 1562 =

United Nations Security Council resolution

UN Security Council Resolution 1562
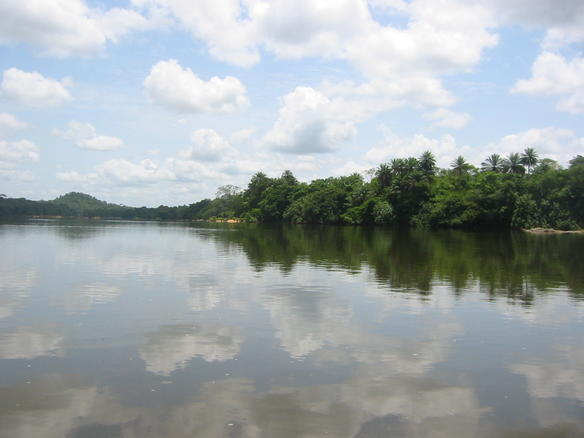
- River in Southern Province, Sierra Leone
- Date: 17 September 2004
- Meeting no.: 5,037
- Code: S/RES/1562 (Document)
- Subject: The situation in Sierra Leone
- Voting summary: 15 voted for; None voted against; None abstained
- Result: Adopted

Security Council composition
- Permanent members: China; France; Russia; United Kingdom; United States
- Non-permanent members: Algeria; Angola; Benin; Brazil; Chile; Germany; Pakistan; Philippines; Romania; Spain

United Nations Security Council resolution 1562 was adopted unanimously on 17 September 2004. After recalling all previous resolutions on the situation in Sierra Leone, the Council extended the mandate of the United Nations Mission in Sierra Leone (UNAMSIL) residual presence for a period of nine months until 30 June 2005.

== Resolution ==
=== Observations ===
In the preamble of the resolution, the Security Council praised the efforts of the Economic Community of West African States (ECOWAS) to build peace in the subregion and urged the Mano River Union to engage in dialogue. United Nations operations in the region were asked to enhance co-operation, particularly with regard to preventing the movement of weapons and combatants across borders. The Council welcomed progress in the drawdown of UNAMSIL and underlined the importance of strengthening the capacity of the Sierra Leone Police. The work of the Special Court for Sierra Leone was also praised.

=== Acts ===
Acting under Chapter VII of the United Nations Charter, the Council extended the mandate of UNAMSIL's residual force as set out in Resolution 1537 (2004) and tasked it with military, police and civilian operations, further authorising it to use all necessary measures to fulfil its mandate. Its presence would be reviewed using the following criteria:

- The reinforcement of the Sierra Leonean army and police;
- Consolidating state authority throughout Sierra Leone;
- Consolidating the deployment of the United Nations Mission in Liberia in Liberia.

The government of Sierra Leone was urged to develop the police force, armed forces, penal system and independent judiciary to enable a transition from UNAMSIL to the government. Finally, the Council welcomed the Secretary-General Kofi Annan's intention to keep the situation in Sierra Leone under review.

== See also ==
- Ivorian Civil War
- List of United Nations Security Council Resolutions 1501 to 1600 (2003–2005)
- Second Liberian Civil War
- Sierra Leone Civil War
- Special Court for Sierra Leone
