= United Nations Security Council Resolution 1512 =

UN Security Council Resolution 1512
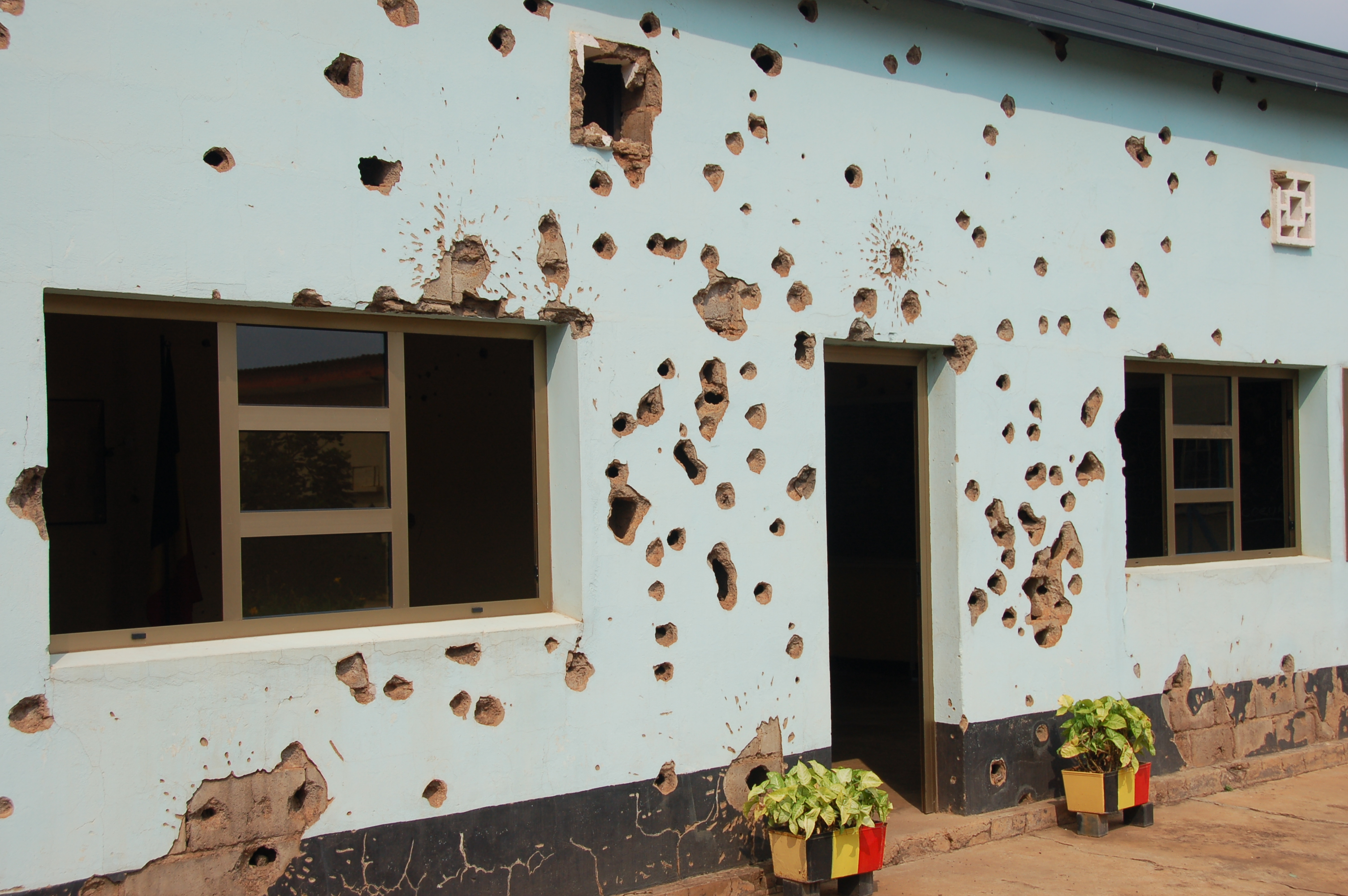
- Bullet holes from the Rwandan genocide
- Date: 27 October 2003
- Meeting no.: 4,849
- Code: S/RES/1512 (Document)
- Subject: The International Criminal Tribunal for Rwanda
- Voting summary: 15 voted for; None voted against; None abstained
- Result: Adopted

Security Council composition
- Permanent members: China; France; Russia; United Kingdom; United States
- Non-permanent members: Angola; Bulgaria; Chile; Cameroon; Germany; Guinea; Mexico; Pakistan; Spain; Syria

United Nations Security Council resolution 1512, adopted unanimously on 27 October 2003, after recalling resolutions 955 (1994), 1165 (1998), 1329 (2000), 1411 (2002), 1431 (2002) and 1503 (2003) on Rwanda, the Council increased the number of temporary judges serving at the same time at the International Criminal Tribunal for Rwanda (ICTR) from four to nine.

The Security Council was convinced of the need to increase the powers of temporary judges at the ICTR so that they may adjudicate in pre-trial proceedings in other cases in addition to their own trials. Furthermore, the number of temporary judges appointed at any one time would also be increased to ensure the completion of all trial activities at first instance by the end of 2008. Acting under Chapter VII of the United Nations Charter, the relevant changes were made to the Statute of the ICTR.

== See also ==
- List of United Nations Security Council Resolutions 1501 to 1600 (2003–2005)
- Rwandan genocide
