= United Nations Security Council Resolution 1505 =

UN Security Council Resolution 1505
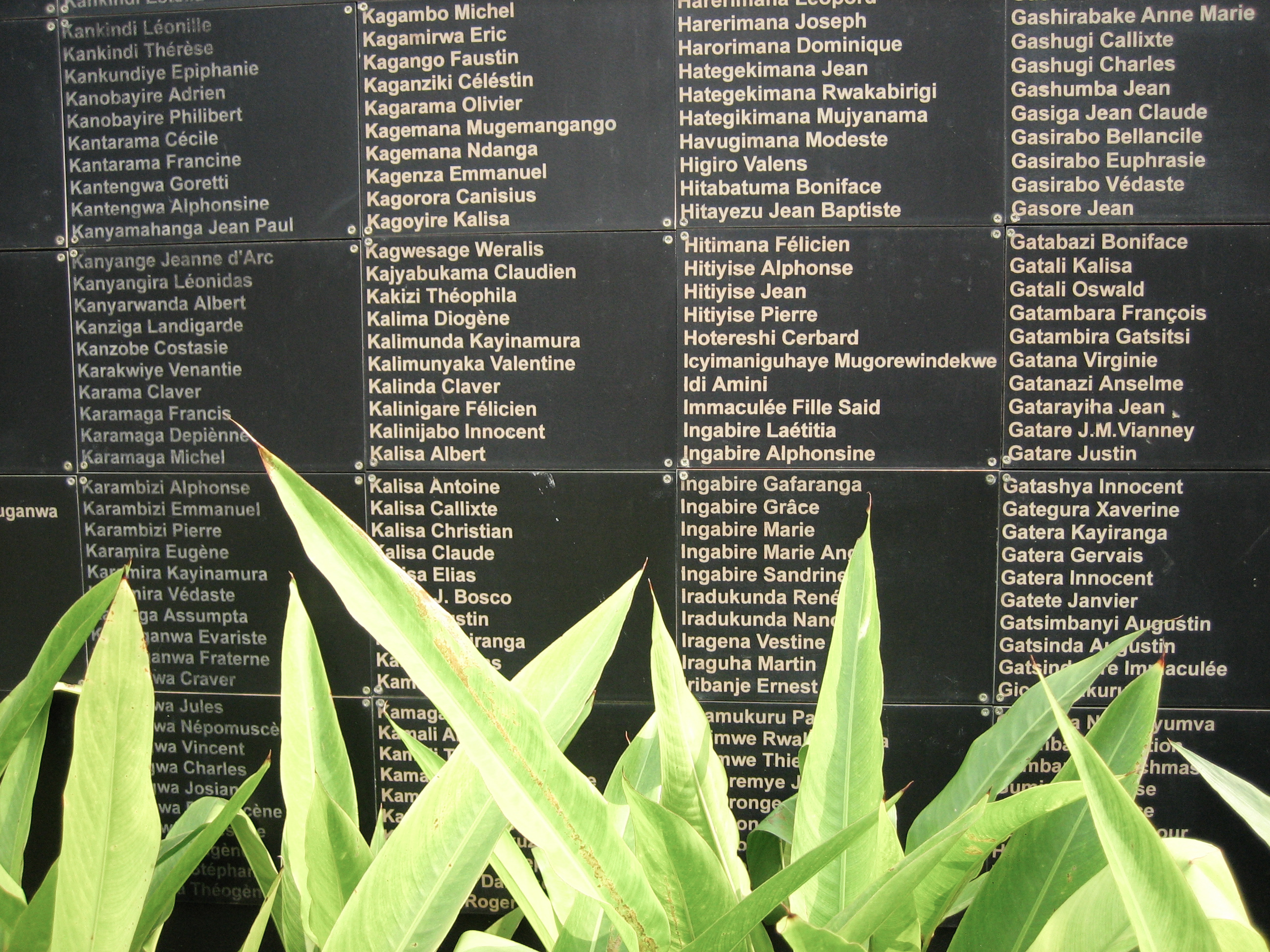
- Memorial centre in Kigali
- Date: 4 September 2003
- Meeting no.: 4,819
- Code: S/RES/1505 (Document)
- Subject: The International Criminal Tribunal for Rwanda
- Voting summary: 15 voted for; None voted against; None abstained
- Result: Adopted

Security Council composition
- Permanent members: China; France; Russia; United Kingdom; United States
- Non-permanent members: Angola; Bulgaria; Chile; Cameroon; Germany; Guinea; Mexico; Pakistan; Spain; Syria

United Nations Security Council resolution 1505, adopted unanimously on 4 September 2003, after recalling Resolution 1503 (2003), the Council appointed Hassan Bubacar Jallow as Prosecutor at the International Criminal Tribunal for Rwanda (ICTR).

The Security Council noted the new position of Prosecutor at the ICTR created by Resolution 1503, and subsequently approved Hassan Bubacar Jallow's appointment for a four-year term, beginning on 15 September 2003.

== See also ==
- List of United Nations Security Council Resolutions 1501 to 1600 (2003–2005)
- Rwandan genocide
