= United Nations Security Council Resolution 1523 =

UN Security Council Resolution 1523
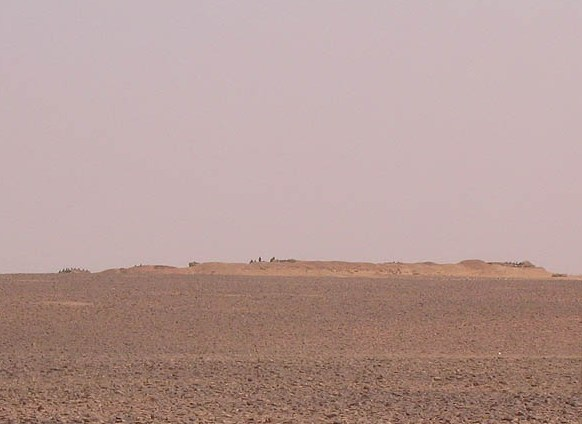
- Western Sahara desert
- Date: 30 January 2004
- Meeting no.: 4,905
- Code: S/RES/1523 (Document)
- Subject: The situation concerning Western Sahara
- Voting summary: 15 voted for; None voted against; None abstained
- Result: Adopted

Security Council composition
- Permanent members: China; France; Russia; United Kingdom; United States
- Non-permanent members: Algeria; Angola; Benin; Brazil; Chile; Germany; Pakistan; Philippines; Romania; Spain

United Nations Security Council resolution 1523, adopted unanimously on 30 January 2004, after recalling all previous resolutions on the situation in Western Sahara, particularly Resolution 1495 (2003), the Council extended the mandate of the United Nations Mission for the Referendum in Western Sahara (MINURSO) until 30 April 2004.

The decision to extend MINURSO's mandate was made after a request by James Baker III for further discussions with Morocco concerning the Baker Plan, relating to the self-determination of the territory. The Polisario Front accepted the plan on 6 July 2003. Secretary-General Kofi Annan was requested to report on the situation at the end of MINURSO's mandate.

== See also ==
- Free Zone (region)
- Political status of Western Sahara
- List of United Nations Security Council Resolutions 1501 to 1600 (2003–2005)
- Sahrawi Arab Democratic Republic
- Moroccan Western Sahara Wall
