= United Nations Security Council Resolution 1516 =

UN Security Council Resolution 1516
- Map of Istanbul
- Date: 20 November 2003
- Meeting no.: 4,867
- Code: S/RES/1516 (Document)
- Subject: Threats to international peace and security caused by terrorist acts
- Voting summary: 15 voted for; None voted against; None abstained
- Result: Adopted

Security Council composition
- Permanent members: China; France; Russia; United Kingdom; United States
- Non-permanent members: Angola; Bulgaria; Chile; Cameroon; Germany; Guinea; Mexico; Pakistan; Spain; Syria

United Nations Security Council resolution 1516, adopted unanimously on 20 November 2003, after reaffirming the principles of the United Nations Charter and Resolution 1373 (2001), the council condemned the bombings in Istanbul, Turkey on 15 and 20 November 2003.

The Security Council reaffirmed the need to combat threats to international peace and security caused by terrorist acts and condemned the bomb attacks in Istanbul, in which 57 people died and over 700 people were injured, as well as other terrorist acts in various countries. It expressed sympathy and condolences to the families of the victims and the people and governments of Turkey and the United Kingdom.

The resolution called upon all states to co-operate to bring the perpetrators to justice in accordance with their obligations under Resolution 1373. Finally, the council concluded by expressing its determination to combat all forms of terrorism.

== See also ==
- 2003 Istanbul bombings
- List of United Nations Security Council Resolutions 1501 to 1600 (2003–2005)
