= United Nations Security Council Resolution 1578 =

UN Security Council Resolution 1578
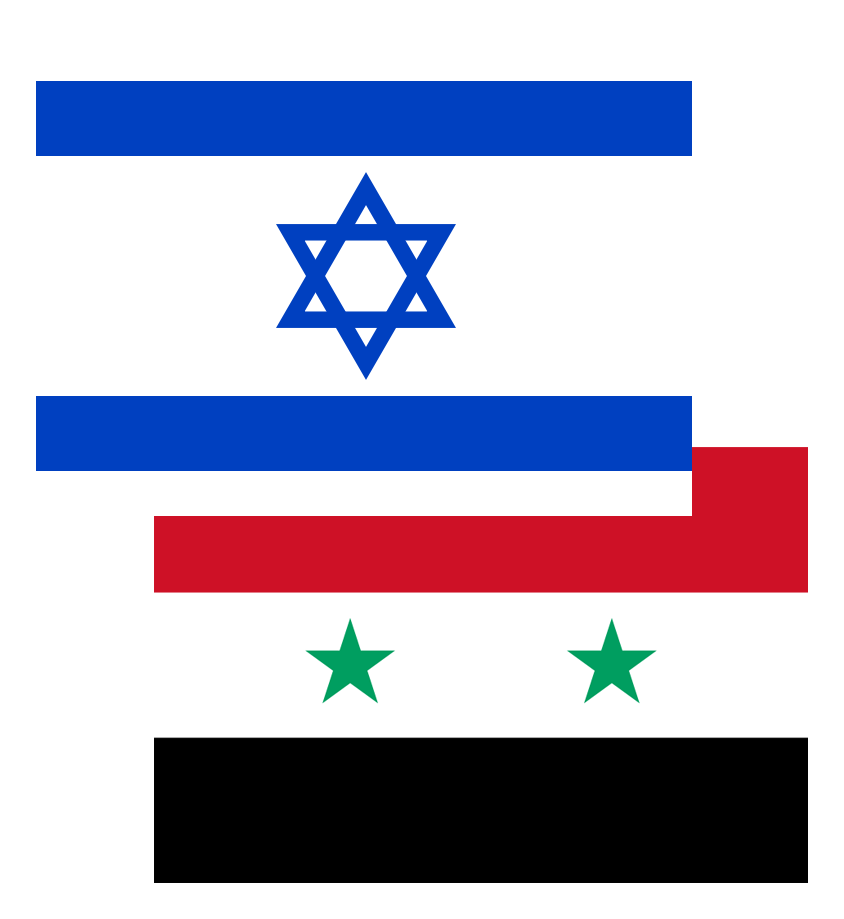
- The flags of Israel and Syria
- Date: 15 December 2004
- Meeting no.: 5,101
- Code: S/RES/1578 (Document)
- Subject: The situation in the Middle East
- Voting summary: 15 voted for; None voted against; None abstained
- Result: Adopted

Security Council composition
- Permanent members: China; France; Russia; United Kingdom; United States
- Non-permanent members: Algeria; Angola; Benin; Brazil; Chile; Germany; Pakistan; Philippines; Romania; Spain

United Nations Security Council resolution 1578, adopted unanimously on 15 December 2004, after considering a report by the Secretary-General Kofi Annan regarding the United Nations Disengagement Observer Force (UNDOF), the Council extended its mandate for a further six months until 30 June 2005.

The resolution called upon the parties concerned to immediately implement Resolution 338 (1973) and requested that the Secretary-General submit a report on the situation at the end of that period.

The Secretary-General's report pursuant to the previous resolution on UNDOF said that the situation between Israel and Syria had remained generally quiet, though the situation in the Middle East as a whole remained dangerous until a settlement could be reached.

== See also ==
- Arab–Israeli conflict
- Golan Heights
- Israel–Syria relations
- List of United Nations Security Council Resolutions 1501 to 1600 (2003–2005)
- 2000–2006 Shebaa Farms conflict
