= United Nations Security Council Resolution 1517 =

UN Security Council Resolution 1517
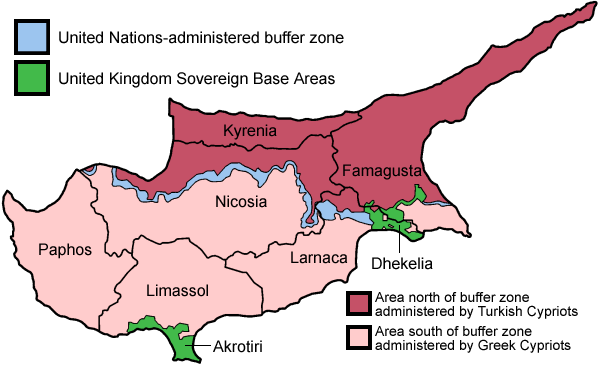
- Divided Cyprus
- Date: 24 November 2003
- Meeting no.: 4,870
- Code: S/RES/1517 (Document)
- Subject: The situation in Cyprus
- Voting summary: 15 voted for; None voted against; None abstained
- Result: Adopted

Security Council composition
- Permanent members: China; France; Russia; United Kingdom; United States
- Non-permanent members: Angola; Bulgaria; Chile; Cameroon; Germany; Guinea; Mexico; Pakistan; Spain; Syria

The United Nations Security Council resolution 1517 was adopted unanimously on 24 November 2003, after reaffirming all resolutions on the situation in Cyprus, particularly Resolution 1251 (1999), the council extended the mandate of the United Nations Peacekeeping Force in Cyprus (UNFICYP) for an additional six months until 15 June 2004.

The security council noted the call within the Secretary-General Kofi Annan's report for the authorities in Cyprus and Northern Cyprus to urgently address the humanitarian situation concerning missing persons. It also welcomed efforts to sensitise United Nations peacekeeping personnel towards the prevention and control of HIV/AIDS and other diseases.

Extending UNFICYP's mandate, the resolution requested the secretary-general to report to the council by 1 June 2004 on the implementation of the current resolution. It expressed concern at violations by the Turkish Cypriot side at Strovilia and called for an end to restrictions imposed on 30 June 2000 on UNFICYP operations and to restore the military status quo.

== See also ==
- Annan Plan
- Cyprus dispute
- List of United Nations Security Council Resolutions 1501 to 1600 (2003–2005)
- United Nations Buffer Zone in Cyprus
- Turkish invasion of Cyprus
