= United Nations Security Council Resolution 1569 =

UN Security Council Resolution 1569
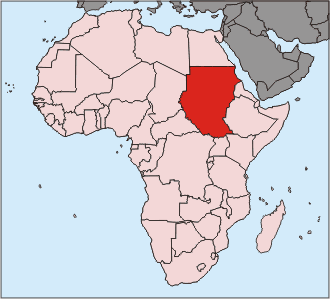
- Location of Sudan
- Date: 26 October 2004
- Meeting no.: 5,063
- Code: S/RES/1569 (Document)
- Subject: The situation concerning Sudan
- Voting summary: 15 voted for; None voted against; None abstained
- Result: Adopted

Security Council composition
- Permanent members: China; France; Russia; United Kingdom; United States
- Non-permanent members: Algeria; Angola; Benin; Brazil; Chile; Germany; Pakistan; Philippines; Romania; Spain

United Nations Security Council Resolution 1569, adopted unanimously on 26 October 2004, after invoking Article 28 of the United Nations Charter, the Council decided to hold a two-day meeting on the situation in Sudan in Nairobi, Kenya.

The meeting would take place on 18–19 November 2004, with discussions on the conflict in Darfur and civil war in Southern Sudan. Furthermore, the resolution stated that representatives of the African Union and Intergovernmental Authority on Development would be present at the meeting, which would also discuss other peace efforts in the region.

The meeting was the eleventh time the Security Council had met away from its headquarters in New York City, and the first time it had met in Nairobi.

== See also ==
- African Union Mission in Sudan
- United Nations–African Union Mission in Darfur
- International response to the War in Darfur
- List of United Nations Security Council Resolutions 1501 to 1600 (2003–2005)
- United Nations Mission in Sudan
- War in Darfur
