= United Nations Security Council Resolution 1571 =

UN Security Council Resolution 1571
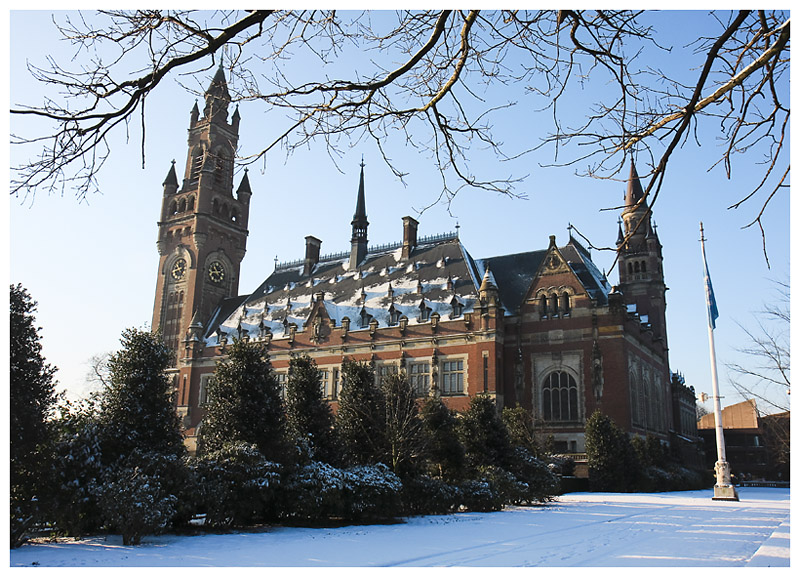
- International Court of Justice
- Date: 4 November 2004
- Meeting no.: 5,070
- Code: S/RES/1571 (Document)
- Subject: International Court of Justice
- Result: Adopted

Security Council composition
- Permanent members: China; France; Russia; United Kingdom; United States
- Non-permanent members: Algeria; Angola; Benin; Brazil; Chile; Germany; Pakistan; Philippines; Romania; Spain

United Nations Security Council resolution 1571, adopted without a vote on 4 November 2004, after noting the resignation of International Court of Justice (ICJ) judge Gilbert Guillaume taking effect on 11 February 2005, the council decided that elections to the vacancy on the ICJ would take place on 15 February 2005 at the security council and at a meeting of the General Assembly during its 59th session.

Guillaume, a French jurist, was a member of the court since September 1987 and its president from 2000 to 2003. His term of office was due to expire in February 2009. He was replaced by Ronny Abraham.

== See also ==
- Judges of the International Court of Justice
- List of United Nations Security Council Resolutions 1501 to 1600 (2003–2005)
