= United Nations Security Council Resolution 1513 =

UN Security Council Resolution 1513
- Western Sahara
- Date: 28 October 2003
- Meeting no.: 4,850
- Code: S/RES/1513 (Document)
- Subject: The situation concerning Western Sahara
- Voting summary: 15 voted for; None voted against; None abstained
- Result: Adopted

Security Council composition
- Permanent members: China; France; Russia; United Kingdom; United States
- Non-permanent members: Angola; Bulgaria; Chile; Cameroon; Germany; Guinea; Mexico; Pakistan; Spain; Syria

United Nations Security Council resolution 1513, adopted unanimously on 28 October 2003, after recalling all previous resolutions on the situation in Western Sahara, particularly Resolution 1495 (2003), the Council extended the mandate of the United Nations Mission for the Referendum in Western Sahara (MINURSO) until 31 January 2004.

The decision to extend MINURSO's mandate was taken after a request by Morocco to further consider the Baker Plan proposed by James Baker III, relating to the self-determination of the territory; the Polisario Front accepted the plan on 6 July 2003. The Secretary-General Kofi Annan was requested to report on the situation at the end of MINURSO's mandate.

== See also ==
- Free Zone (region)
- Political status of Western Sahara
- List of United Nations Security Council Resolutions 1501 to 1600 (2003–2005)
- Sahrawi Arab Democratic Republic
- Moroccan Western Sahara Wall
