= United Nations Security Council Resolution 1530 =

UN Security Council Resolution 1530
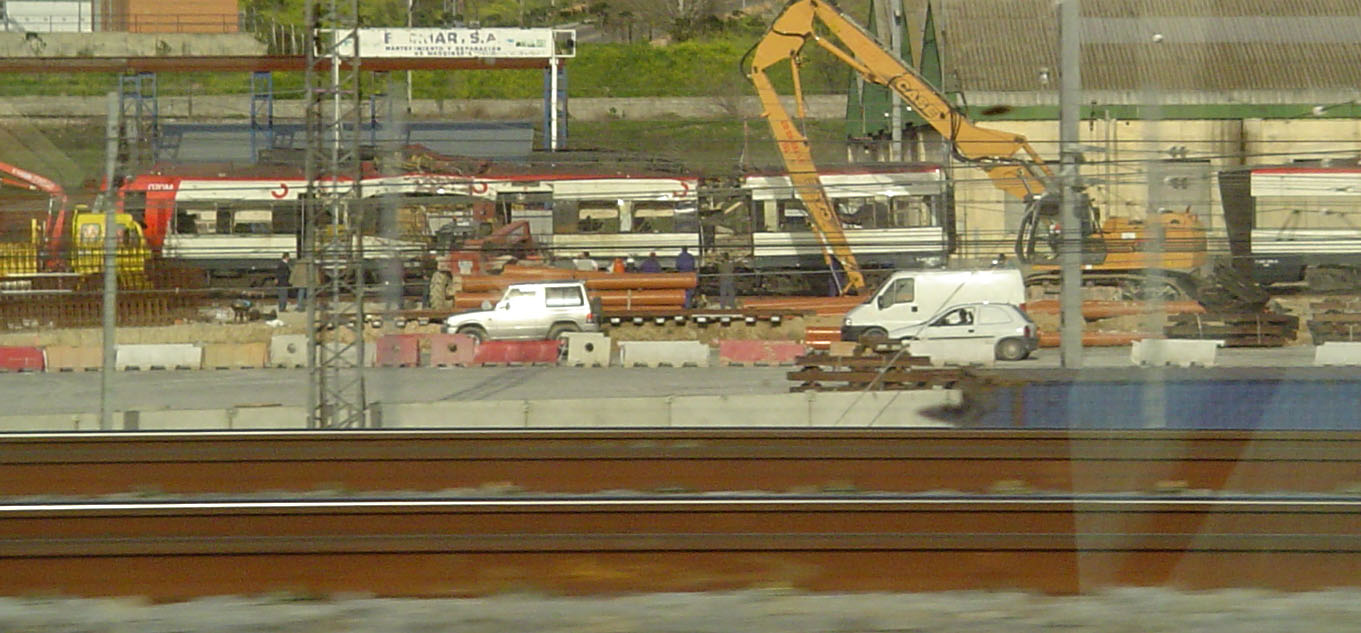
- Remains of one of the trains, near Atocha station
- Date: 11 March 2004
- Meeting no.: 4,923
- Code: S/RES/1530 (Document)
- Subject: Threats to international peace and security caused by terrorist acts
- Voting summary: 15 voted for; None voted against; None abstained
- Result: Adopted

Security Council composition
- Permanent members: China; France; Russia; United Kingdom; United States
- Non-permanent members: Algeria; Angola; Benin; Brazil; Chile; Germany; Pakistan; Philippines; Romania; Spain

United Nations Security Council resolution 1530, adopted unanimously on 11 March 2004, after reaffirming the principles of the United Nations Charter and Resolution 1373 (2001), the council condemned the train bombings in Madrid, Spain, on 11 March 2004. It was passed hours after the attacks.

The Security Council reaffirmed the need to combat threats to international peace and security caused by terrorist acts and condemned the bomb attacks in Madrid, in which many people died and people injured. It mistakenly identified the Basque separatist group ETA as responsible for the attacks. It expressed sympathy and condolences to the families of the victims and the people and government of Spain.

The resolution called upon all states to co-operate to bring the perpetrators to justice in accordance with their obligations under Resolution 1373. Finally, the council concluded by expressing its determination to combat all forms of terrorism.

== See also ==
- List of terrorist incidents
- List of United Nations Security Council Resolutions 1501 to 1600 (2003–2005)
