= United Nations Security Council Resolution 1522 =

UN Security Council Resolution 1522
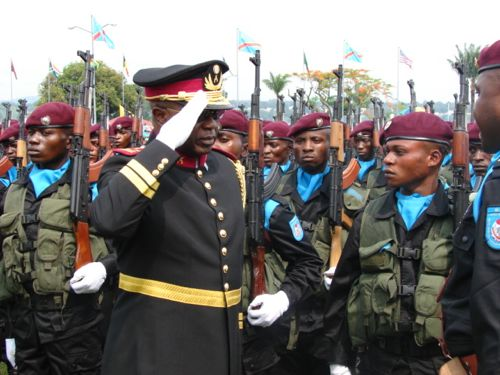
- Former Congolese Chairman of the Joint Chiefs, General Kisempia Sungilanga
- Date: 15 January 2004
- Meeting no.: 4,894
- Code: S/RES/1522 (Document)
- Subject: The situation concerning the Democratic Republic of the Congo
- Voting summary: 15 voted for; None voted against; None abstained
- Result: Adopted

Security Council composition
- Permanent members: China; France; Russia; United Kingdom; United States
- Non-permanent members: Algeria; Angola; Benin; Brazil; Chile; Germany; Pakistan; Philippines; Romania; Spain

United Nations Security Council resolution 1522, adopted unanimously on 15 January 2004, after recalling all previous resolutions on the situation in the Democratic Republic of the Congo, the council welcomed efforts to establish the first integrated and unified brigade in Kisangani as a step towards forming a national army. It was the first Security Council resolution adopted in 2004.

The security council was encouraged by progress in the Congolese peace process in the country and considered a reform of the security sector, the restructuring and integration of armed forces, and establishment of a national police in the Democratic Republic of the Congo was essential to the success of the transition process. It reaffirmed the responsibility of the Government of National Unity and Transition and welcomed the establishment of a High Command.

The resolution welcomed steps to establish an integrated and unified brigade in Kisangani as part of an overall formation of a Congolese national army. Since the government was in place, demands for demilitarisation in Kisangani contained in Resolution 1304 (2000) would not apply to restructured and integrated forces. The government was urged to take appropriate measures for the restructuring and integration of the country's armed forces and the international community was asked to assist in that regard.

== See also ==
- Kivu conflict
- Ituri conflict
- List of United Nations Security Council Resolutions 1501 to 1600 (2003–2005)
- Second Congo War
