= United Nations Security Council Resolution 1501 =

UN Security Council Resolution 1501
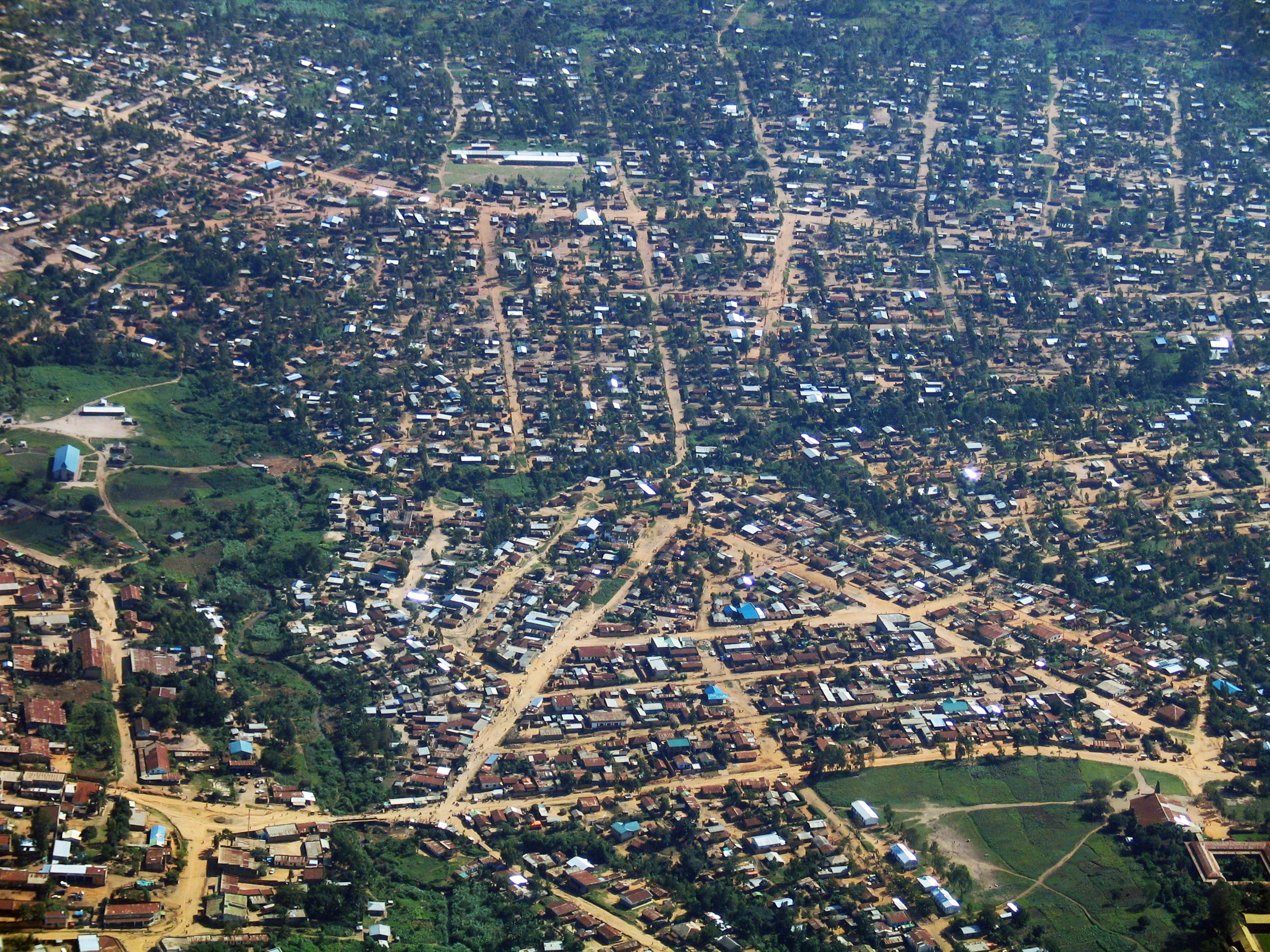
- Bunia in the Democratic Republic of the Congo
- Date: 26 August 2003
- Meeting no.: 4,813
- Code: S/RES/1501 (Document)
- Subject: The situation concerning the Democratic Republic of the Congo
- Voting summary: 15 voted for; None voted against; None abstained
- Result: Adopted

Security Council composition
- Permanent members: China; France; Russia; United Kingdom; United States
- Non-permanent members: Angola; Bulgaria; Chile; Cameroon; Germany; Guinea; Mexico; Pakistan; Spain; Syria

United Nations Security Council resolution 1501, adopted unanimously on 26 August 2003, after recalling all previous resolutions on the situation in the Democratic Republic of the Congo, particularly resolutions 1484 (2003) and 1493 (2003), authorised countries participating in Operation Artemis in Bunia to assist the United Nations Mission in the Democratic Republic of Congo (MONUC) as it was deployed around the town.

The Security Council remained concerned about hostilities in eastern Democratic Republic of the Congo, including North and South Kivu and Ituri Province. It reiterated its support for the peace process, and for the multinational force, Operation Artemis. Acting under Chapter VII of the United Nations Charter, the Council approved the Secretary-General Kofi Annan's decision to authorise countries participating in Operation Artemis (which was due to end on 1 September) to assist the MONUC contingent in the town of Bunia and immediate surroundings if requested to do so by MONUC.

Kofi Annan said the decision was necessary in case the situation became volatile in Bunia during the transitional period from the multinational force to MONUC.

== See also ==
- Kivu conflict
- Ituri conflict
- List of United Nations Security Council Resolutions 1501 to 1600 (2003–2005)
- Lusaka Ceasefire Agreement
- Second Congo War
