= United Nations Security Council Resolution 1531 =

UN Security Council Resolution 1531
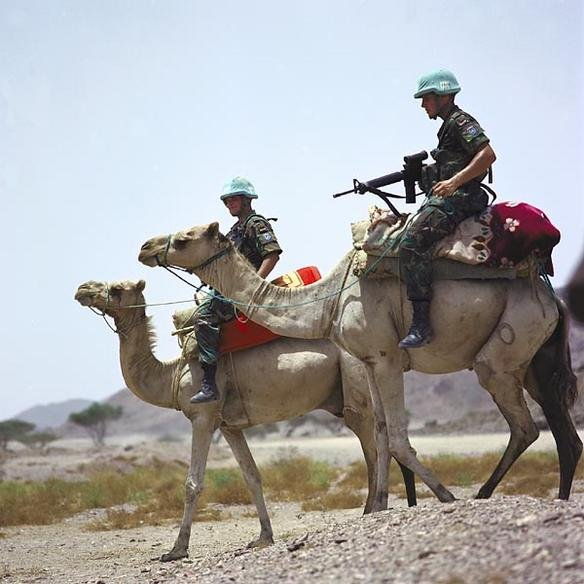
- UNMEE soldiers in Eritrea
- Date: 12 March 2004
- Meeting no.: 4,924
- Code: S/RES/1531 (Document)
- Subject: The situation between Eritrea and Ethiopia
- Voting summary: 15 voted for; None voted against; None abstained
- Result: Adopted

Security Council composition
- Permanent members: China; France; Russia; United Kingdom; United States
- Non-permanent members: Algeria; Angola; Benin; Brazil; Chile; Germany; Pakistan; Philippines; Romania; Spain

United Nations Security Council resolution 1531 is a United Nation Security Council resolution that was adopted unanimously on 12 March 2004. After reaffirming all resolutions on the situation between Eritrea and Ethiopia, particularly Resolution 1507 (2003), the council extended the mandate of the United Nations Mission in Ethiopia and Eritrea (UNMEE) until 15 September 2004.

== Resolution ==
=== Observations ===
The Security Council reaffirmed its support for the peace process between the two countries and of the role played by UNMEE in facilitating the implementation of the Algiers Agreement and decision by the Boundary Commission on the mutual border. It expressed concern at the impasse in the peace process caused by delays in the demarcation of the mutual border. There was concern that the commission could not conduct its work and the lack of co-operation from both Ethiopia and Eritrea with the United Nations in this regard.

=== Acts ===
The resolution extended UNMEE's mandate at the prevailing troop level of 4,200 in accordance with Resolution 1320 (2000). Both parties were urged to fulfil their commitments under the Algiers Agreement and co-operate with the Boundary Commission in order for it to fulfil its mandate. The parties were further called upon to co-operate with UNMEE, protect United Nations personnel and establish an air corridor between the capitals of Addis Ababa and Asmara to facilitate the work of the operation and reduce additional costs to the United Nations.

The Council reaffirmed the importance of dialogue between the two countries and the normalisation of their diplomatic relations, while progress would be monitored. The Secretary-General Kofi Annan was requested to constantly review the effectiveness of UNMEE and consider possible streamlining measures.

== See also ==
- Badme
- Eritrean–Ethiopian War
- List of United Nations Security Council Resolutions 1501 to 1600 (2003–2005)
