= United Nations Security Council Resolution 1555 =

UN Security Council Resolution 1555
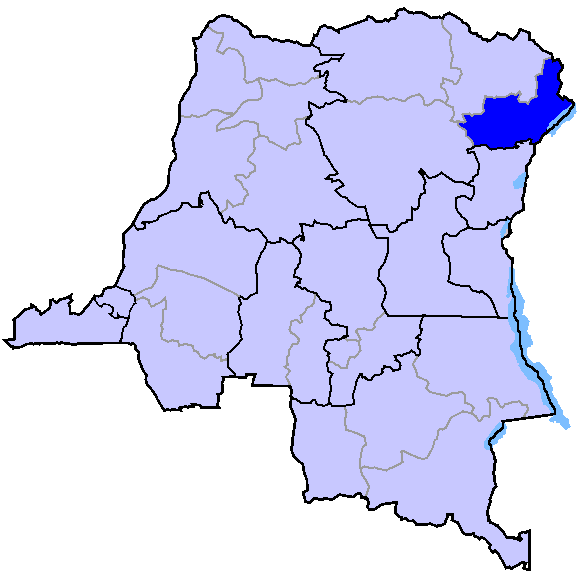
- Ituri region of the Democratic Republic of the Congo
- Date: 29 July 2004
- Meeting no.: 5,014
- Code: S/RES/1555 (Document)
- Subject: The situation concerning the Democratic Republic of the Congo
- Voting summary: 15 voted for; None voted against; None abstained
- Result: Adopted

Security Council composition
- Permanent members: China; France; Russia; United Kingdom; United States
- Non-permanent members: Algeria; Angola; Benin; Brazil; Chile; Germany; Pakistan; Philippines; Romania; Spain

United Nations Security Council resolution 1555, adopted unanimously on 29 July 2004, after recalling all previous resolutions on the situation in the Democratic Republic of the Congo, including resolutions 1493 (2003) and 1533 (2004), the Council extended the mandate of the United Nations Mission in the Democratic Republic of Congo (MONUC) until 1 October 2004.

The Security Council reaffirmed its support for the transitional government of the Democratic Republic of the Congo and the peace process. It expressed concern at tensions and hostilities in the east of the country, particularly conflicts in Ituri, North Kivu and South Kivu.

Extending MONUC's mandate, the Council further requested the Secretary-General Kofi Annan to report before 16 August 2004 on the implementation of MONUC's mandate.

== See also ==
- Kivu conflict
- Ituri conflict
- List of United Nations Security Council Resolutions 1501 to 1600 (2003–2005)
- Second Congo War
