= United Nations Security Council Resolution 1549 =

UN Security Council Resolution 1549
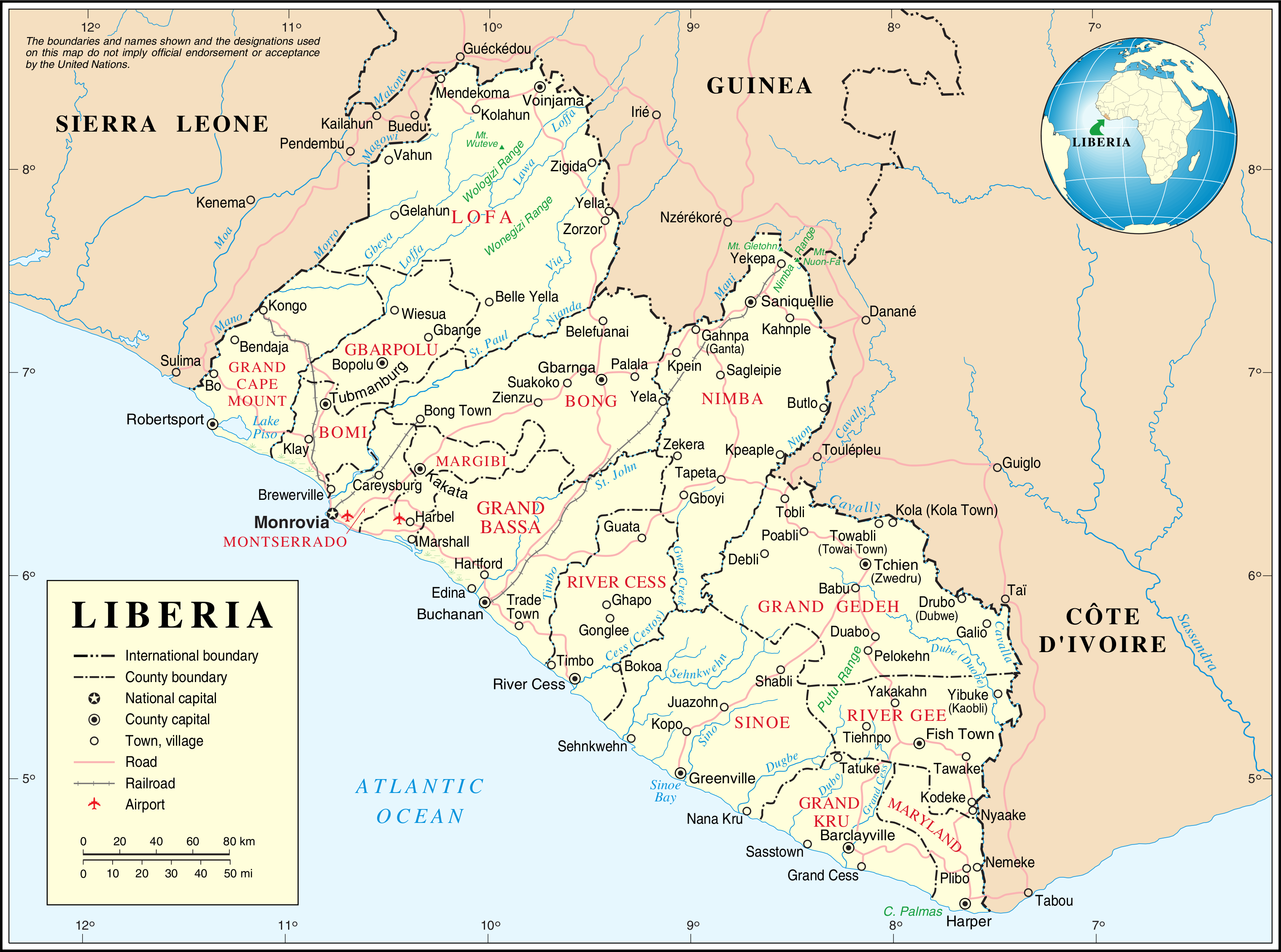
- Liberia
- Date: 17 June 2004
- Meeting no.: 4,991
- Code: S/RES/1549 (Document)
- Subject: The situation in Liberia
- Voting summary: 15 voted for; None voted against; None abstained
- Result: Adopted

Security Council composition
- Permanent members: China; France; Russia; United Kingdom; United States
- Non-permanent members: Algeria; Angola; Benin; Brazil; Chile; Germany; Pakistan; Philippines; Romania; Spain

United Nations Security Council resolution 1549, adopted unanimously on 17 June 2004, after recalling all previous resolutions on the situation in Liberia, particularly resolutions 1521 (2003) and 1532 (2004), the Council re-established an expert panel to oversee international sanctions against Liberia.

== Resolution ==
=== Observations ===
The Security Council noted previous reports from an expert panel and Secretary-General on the situation in Liberia, and an appeal from the Liberian transitional government to lift sanctions against timber and diamonds.

=== Acts ===
The expert panel was re-established for a period until 21 December 2004 to conduct a follow-up mission to Liberia and nearby countries to investigate the implementation and any violations of the sanctions, and to assess the humanitarian and socio-economic impact of the measures. The panel was asked to provide two reports concerning those issues by 30 September 2004 and 10 December 2004. Furthermore, the Secretary-General Kofi Annan was requested to appoint up to five experts to serve on the panel.

The transitional government was asked to establish a suitable certificate of origin regime for diamonds and to establish its control over the timber producing areas. Finally, the international community was called upon to assist the transitional government in Liberia through economic recovery and reconstruction, and to co-operate with the expert panel and sanctions Committee.

== See also ==
- List of United Nations Security Council Resolutions 1501 to 1600 (2003–2005)
- Second Liberian Civil War
