= List of United Nations Security Council Resolutions 1501 to 1600 =

This is a list of United Nations Security Council Resolutions 1501 to 1600 adopted between 26 August 2003 and 4 May 2005.

Resolution	Date	Vote	Concerns
1501	26 August 2003	15–0–0	Authorises multinational force in eastern Democratic Republic of the Congo to assist the United Nations Mission in the Democratic Republic of the Congo
1502	26 August 2003	15–0–0	Protection of United Nations and humanitarian personnel in conflict zones
1503	28 August 2003	15–0–0	Splits prosecutorial duties for the International Criminal Tribunals for Rwanda and the former Yugoslavia
1504	4 September 2003	15–0–0	Appoints Carla Del Ponte as Prosecutor at the International Criminal Tribunal for the former Yugoslavia
1505	4 September 2003	15–0–0	Appoints Hassan Bubacar Jallow as Prosecutor at the International Criminal Tribunal for Rwanda
1506	12 September 2003	13–0–2 (abstentions: France, United States)	Lifts sanctions against Libya
1507	12 September 2003	15–0–0	Extends mandate of the United Nations Mission in Ethiopia and Eritrea
1508	19 September 2003	15–0–0	Extends mandate of the United Nations Mission in Sierra Leone
1509	19 September 2003	15–0–0	Establishes the United Nations Mission in Liberia
1510	13 October 2003	15–0–0	Expands and extends the mandate of the International Security Assistance Force in Afghanistan
1511	16 October 2003	15–0–0	Authorises multinational force in Iraq to contribute towards security
1512	27 October 2003	15–0–0	Increases number of temporary judges at the International Criminal Tribunal for Rwanda
1513	28 October 2003	15–0–0	Extends mandate of the United Nations Mission for the Referendum in Western Sahara
1514	13 November 2003	15–0–0	Extends mandate of the United Nations Mission in Côte d'Ivoire
1515	19 November 2003	15–0–0	Endorses Road map for peace proposed by the Middle East Quartet in the Israeli–Palestinian conflict
1516	20 November 2003	15–0–0	Condemns bombings in Istanbul, Turkey
1517	24 November 2003	15–0–0	Extends mandate of the United Nations Peacekeeping Force in Cyprus
1518	24 November 2003	15–0–0	Establishes Committee to track financial assets removed from Iraq by persons connected to Saddam Hussein
1519	16 December 2003	15–0–0	Establishes monitoring group investigating violations of arms embargo against Somalia
1520	22 December 2003	15–0–0	Extends mandate of the United Nations Disengagement Observer Force
1521	22 December 2003	15–0–0	Renews international sanctions against Liberia; establishes Committee
1522	15 January 2004	15–0–0	Integration and restructuring of armed forces in the Democratic Republic of the Congo
1523	30 January 2004	15–0–0	Extends mandate of the United Nations Mission for the Referendum in Western Sahara
1524	30 January 2004	15–0–0	Extends mandate of the United Nations Observer Mission in Georgia
1525	30 January 2004	15–0–0	Extends mandate of the United Nations Interim Force in Lebanon
1526	30 January 2004	15–0–0	Tightens sanctions against Al-Qaeda, the Taliban, Osama bin Laden and other groups
1527	4 February 2004	15–0–0	Extends mandate of the United Nations Mission in Côte d'Ivoire
1528	27 February 2004	15–0–0	Establishes the United Nations Operation in Côte d'Ivoire
1529	29 February 2004	15–0–0	Deploys international force to Haiti following a 2004 Haitian coup d'état
1530	11 March 2004	15–0–0	Condemns bombings in Madrid, Spain
1531	12 March 2004	15–0–0	Extends mandate of the United Nations Mission in Ethiopia and Eritrea
1532	12 March 2004	15–0–0	Freezes assets of Liberian President Charles Taylor and associates
1533	12 March 2004	15–0–0	Strengthens arms embargo against armed groups in eastern Democratic Republic of the Congo
1534	26 March 2004	15–0–0	Calls on the International Criminal Tribunals for Rwanda and the former Yugoslavia to complete trials by 2008
1535	26 March 2004	15–0–0	Restructures the Counter-Terrorism Committee
1536	26 March 2004	15–0–0	Extends mandate of the United Nations Assistance Mission in Afghanistan
1537	30 March 2004	15–0–0	Extends mandate of the United Nations Mission in Sierra Leone
1538	21 April 2004	15–0–0	Inquiry into management of the Iraqi Oil-for-Food Programme
1539	22 April 2004	15–0–0	Condemns recruitment of child soldiers; calls for monitoring of their use
1540	28 April 2004	15–0–0	Calls on states to prevent proliferation of nuclear, chemical or biological weapons
1541	29 April 2004	15–0–0	Extends mandate of the United Nations Mission for the Referendum in Western Sahara
1542	30 April 2004	15–0–0	Establishes the United Nations Stabilization Mission in Haiti
1543	14 May 2004	15–0–0	Extends mandate of the United Nations Mission of Support to East Timor
1544	19 May 2004	14–0–1 (abstention: United States)	Calls upon Israel to cease demolishing Palestinian homes
1545	21 May 2004	15–0–0	Establishes the United Nations Operation in Burundi
1546	8 June 2004	15–0–0	Endorses the interim government in Iraq
1547	11 June 2004	15–0–0	Establishes the United Nations Advance Mission in the Sudan
1548	11 June 2004	15–0–0	Extends mandate of the United Nations Peacekeeping Force in Cyprus
1549	17 June 2004	15–0–0	Re-establishes panel monitoring Liberia sanctions
1550	29 June 2004	15–0–0	Extends mandate of the United Nations Disengagement Observer Force
1551	9 July 2004	15–0–0	Extends mandate of the Stabilisation Force in Bosnia and Herzegovina
1552	27 July 2004	15–0–0	Extends arms embargo against the Democratic Republic of the Congo
1553	29 July 2004	15–0–0	Extends mandate of the United Nations Interim Force in Lebanon
1554	29 July 2004	15–0–0	Extends mandate of the United Nations Observer Mission in Georgia
1555	29 July 2004	15–0–0	Extends mandate of the United Nations Mission in the Democratic Republic of Congo
1556	30 July 2004	13–0–2 (abstentions: China, Pakistan)	Demands Sudan disarm Janjaweed militia in Darfur
1557	12 August 2004	15–0–0	Extends mandate of the United Nations Assistance Mission in Iraq
1558	17 August 2004	15–0–0	Re-establishes group monitoring arms embargo against Somalia
1559	2 September 2004	9–0–6 (abstentions: Algeria, Brazil, China, Pakistan, the Philippines, Russia)	Supports elections in Lebanon; calls for withdrawal of foreign forces
1560	14 September 2004	15–0–0	Extends mandate of the United Nations Mission in Ethiopia and Eritrea
1561	17 September 2004	15–0–0	Extends mandate of the United Nations Mission in Liberia
1562	17 September 2004	15–0–0	Extends mandate of the United Nations Mission in Sierra Leone
1563	17 September 2004	15–0–0	Extends authorisation of the International Security Assistance Force in Afghanistan
1564	18 September 2004	11–0–4 (abstentions: Algeria, China, Pakistan, Russia)	Threatens sanctions against Sudan; establishes inquiry investigating human rights violations in Darfur
1565	1 October 2004	15–0–0	Extends and strengthens the United Nations Mission in the Democratic Republic of Congo
1566	8 October 2004	15–0–0	International co-operation against terrorism
1567	14 October 2004	15–0–0	Nominations for judges at the International Criminal Tribunal for the former Yugoslavia
1568	22 October 2004	15–0–0	Extends mandate of the United Nations Peacekeeping Force in Cyprus
1569	26 October 2004	15–0–0	Decides to hold two-day meeting on the War in Darfur in Nairobi, Kenya
1570	28 October 2004	15–0–0	Extends mandate of the United Nations Mission for the Referendum in Western Sahara
1571	4 November 2004	Adopted without vote	Election and vacancy at the International Court of Justice
1572	15 November 2004	15–0–0	Imposes sanctions on Côte d'Ivoire
1573	16 November 2004	15–0–0	Extends mandate of the United Nations Mission of Support to East Timor
1574	19 November 2004	15–0–0	Extends mandate of the United Nations Advance Mission in the Sudan; Comprehensive Peace Agreement
1575	22 November 2004	15–0–0	Conclusion of the Stabilisation Force in Bosnia and Herzegovina; role of EUFOR Althea
1576	29 November 2004	15–0–0	Extends mandate of the United Nations Stabilization Mission in Haiti
1577	1 December 2004	15–0–0	Extends mandate of the United Nations Operation in Burundi
1578	15 December 2004	15–0–0	Extends mandate of the United Nations Disengagement Observer Force
1579	21 December 2004	15–0–0	Renews sanctions against Liberia; re-establishes expert panel monitoring sanctions
1580	22 December 2004	15–0–0	Extends mandate of the United Nations Peacebuilding Support Office in Guinea-Bissau
1581	18 January 2005	15–0–0	Extends terms of office of temporary judges at the International Criminal Tribunal for the former Yugoslavia
1582	28 January 2005	15–0–0	Extends mandate of the United Nations Observer Mission in Georgia
1583	28 January 2005	15–0–0	Extends mandate of the United Nations Interim Force in Lebanon; condemns violence along the Blue Line
1584	1 February 2005	15–0–0	Strengthens arms embargo against Côte d'Ivoire
1585	10 March 2005	15–0–0	Extends mandate of the United Nations Advance Mission in the Sudan
1586	14 March 2005	15–0–0	Extends mandate of the United Nations Mission in Ethiopia and Eritrea
1587	15 March 2005	15–0–0	Re-establishes panel monitoring arms embargo against Somalia
1588	17 March 2005	15–0–0	Extends mandate of the United Nations Advance Mission in the Sudan
1589	24 March 2005	15–0–0	Extends mandate of the United Nations Assistance Mission in Afghanistan
1590	24 March 2005	15–0–0	Establishes the United Nations Mission in Sudan
1591	27 March 2005	12–0–3 (abstentions: Algeria, China, Russia)	Imposes sanctions against parties "impeding peace process" in Darfur
1592	30 March 2005	15–0–0	Extends mandate of the United Nations Mission in the Democratic Republic of the Congo
1593	31 March 2005	11–0-4 (abstentions: Algeria, Brazil, China, United States)	Refers War in Darfur to the International Criminal Court
1594	4 April 2005	15–0–0	Extends mandate of the United Nations Operation in Côte d'Ivoire
1595	7 April 2005	15–0–0	Establishes international investigation concerning the assassination of former Lebanese Prime Minister Rafic Hariri
1596	18 April 2005	15–0–0	Widens arms embargo against the Democratic Republic of the Congo
1597	20 April 2005	15–0–0	Enables temporary judges at the International Criminal Tribunal for the former Yugoslavia to be re-elected
1598	28 April 2005	15–0–0	Extends mandate of the United Nations Mission for the Referendum in Western Sahara
1599	28 April 2005	15–0–0	Establishes the United Nations Office in East Timor
1600	4 May 2005	15–0–0	Extends mandate of the United Nations Operation in Côte d'Ivoire

== See also ==
- Lists of United Nations Security Council resolutions
- List of United Nations Security Council Resolutions 1401 to 1500
- List of United Nations Security Council Resolutions 1601 to 1700
