= United Nations Security Council Resolution 1518 =

UN Security Council Resolution 1518
- Iraqi coat of arms (1991–2004)
- Date: 24 November 2003
- Meeting no.: 4,872
- Code: S/RES/1518 (Document)
- Subject: The situation between Iraq and Kuwait
- Voting summary: 15 voted for; None voted against; None abstained
- Result: Adopted

Security Council composition
- Permanent members: China; France; Russia; United Kingdom; United States
- Non-permanent members: Angola; Bulgaria; Chile; Cameroon; Germany; Guinea; Mexico; Pakistan; Spain; Syria

United Nations Security Council resolution 1518, adopted unanimously on 24 November 2003, after reaffirming previous resolutions on Iraq, particularly 1483 (2003), the council established a committee to investigate financial assets removed from the country by persons connected to Saddam Hussein.

The Security Council recalled the decision to dissolve the committee established by Resolution 661 (1990) and for all states to implement obligations under Resolution 1483. It determined that the situation in Iraq, although improved, continued to constitute a threat to international peace and security.

Acting under Chapter VII of the United Nations Charter, the council established a committee of the Security Council to update lists from the previous committee concerning individuals or entities connected to Saddam Hussein with immediate effect. Iraqi assets located abroad would then be transferred to an account established by the Coalition Provisional Authority. Finally, the mandate of the new committee would be reviewed, and possibly expanded to include monitoring compliance with an arms embargo against Iraq, other than weapons and ammunition destined for use by the Coalition Provisional Authority.

The French, German, Mexican and Russian representatives had requested that the Committee monitor the arms embargo against Iraq, though this was not included in the final draft of the resolution. In its absence, the French representative requested that monitoring be conducted by the Security Council.

== See also ==
- Iraq War
- List of United Nations Security Council Resolutions 1501 to 1600 (2003–2005)
