= United Nations Security Council Resolution 1548 =

UN Security Council Resolution 1548
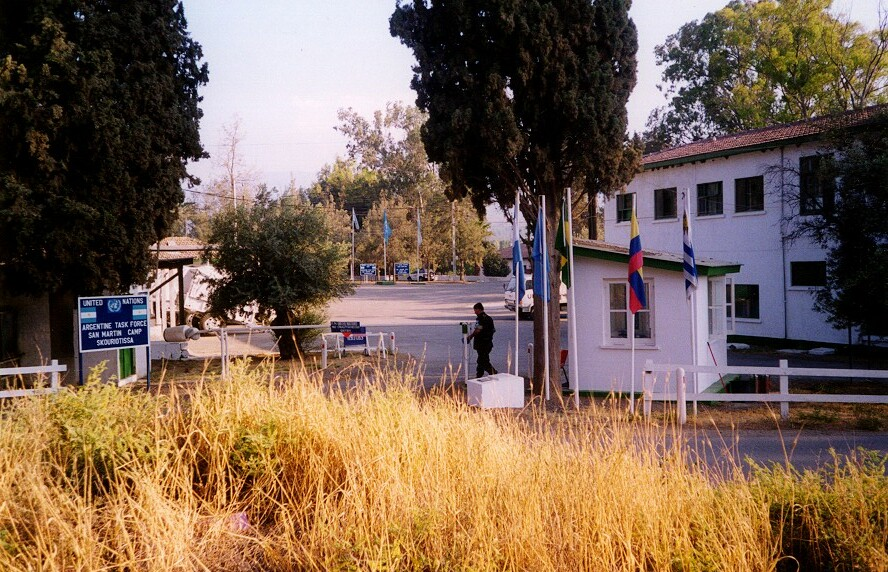
- UNFICYP base
- Date: 11 June 2004
- Meeting no.: 4,989
- Code: S/RES/1548 (Document)
- Subject: The situation in Cyprus
- Voting summary: 15 voted for; None voted against; None abstained
- Result: Adopted

Security Council composition
- Permanent members: China; France; Russia; United Kingdom; United States
- Non-permanent members: Algeria; Angola; Benin; Brazil; Chile; Germany; Pakistan; Philippines; Romania; Spain

Under United Nations Security Council resolution 1548, adopted unanimously on 11 June 2004, after reaffirming all resolutions on the situation in Cyprus, particularly Resolution 1251 (1999), the council extended the mandate of the United Nations Peacekeeping Force in Cyprus (UNFICYP) for an additional six months until 15 December 2004.

The security council noted the call within the Secretary-General Kofi Annan's report for the authorities in Cyprus and Northern Cyprus to urgently address the humanitarian situation concerning missing persons. It welcomed efforts to sensitize United Nations peacekeeping personnel towards the prevention and control of HIV/AIDS and other diseases, and the Secretary-General's intention to review the operation following the Annan Plan referendum on 24 April 2004.

Extending UNFICYP's mandate, the resolution requested the Secretary-General to report to the council on the implementation of the current resolution and would review the recommendations of the secretary-general with regard to the force. It expressed concern at violations by the Turkish Cypriot side at Strovilia and called for an end to restrictions imposed on 30 June 2000 on UNFICYP operations and to restore the military status quo which had existed prior to that date.

== See also ==
- Annan Plan
- Cyprus dispute
- List of United Nations Security Council Resolutions 1501 to 1600 (2003–2005)
- United Nations Buffer Zone in Cyprus
- Turkish invasion of Cyprus
