= United Nations Security Council Resolution 1584 =

UN Security Council Resolution 1584
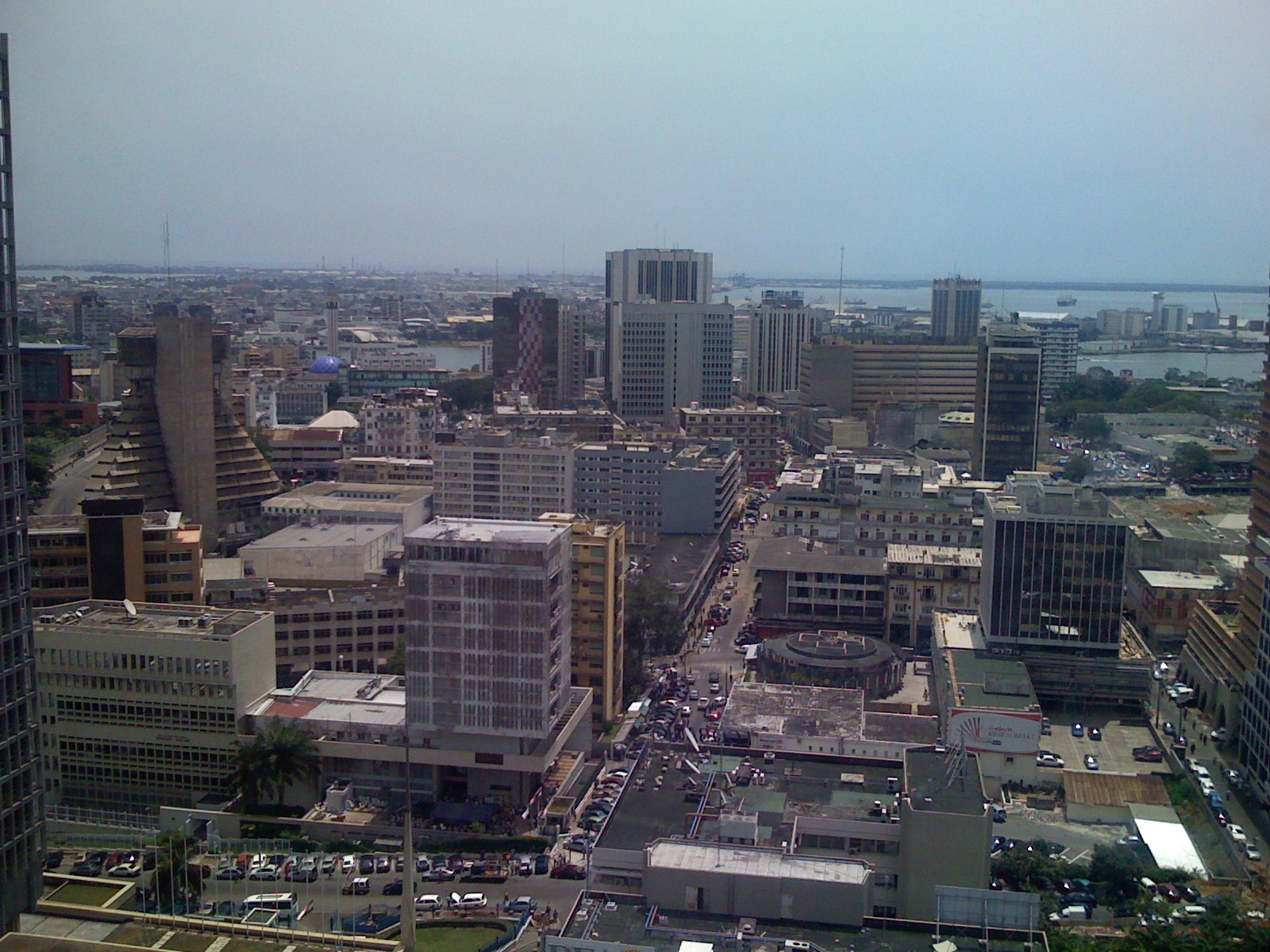
- Ivorian capital Abidjan
- Date: 1 February 2005
- Meeting no.: 5,118
- Code: S/RES/1584 (Document)
- Subject: The situation in Côte d'Ivoire
- Voting summary: 15 voted for; None voted against; None abstained
- Result: Adopted

Security Council composition
- Permanent members: China; France; Russia; United Kingdom; United States
- Non-permanent members: Algeria; Argentina; Benin; Brazil; Denmark; Greece; Japan; Philippines; Romania; Tanzania

United Nations Security Council resolution 1584, adopted unanimously on 1 February 2005, after recalling resolutions 1528 (2004) and 1572 (2004) on the situation in Côte d'Ivoire (Ivory Coast), the council, acting under Chapter VII of the United Nations Charter, strengthened an arms embargo against the country.

== Resolution ==
=== Observations ===
The security council noted that, despite various political agreements, hostilities had resumed in Côte d'Ivoire in violation of the ceasefire agreement of May 2003. Ongoing efforts by the African Union and Economic Community of West African States (ECOWAS) to establish peace and stability were praised. It noted that the situation in the country continued to pose a threat to international peace and stability in the region.

=== Acts ===
The security council reaffirmed the arms embargo against Côte d'Ivoire. The United Nations Operation in Côte d'Ivoire (UNOCI) and French forces were authorised to monitor the implementation of the embargo in co-operation with an expert group, the United Nations Mission in Liberia and United Nations Mission in Sierra Leone and governments, and dispose of items violating the embargo. Furthermore, French forces were asked to provide security assistance to UNOCI.

The resolution demanded that the Ivorian parties provided unhindered access to the French and UNOCI forces, requesting both to report any difficulties in implementing their mandates. The Secretary-General Kofi Annan was requested to establish a group of three experts for six months to examine information gathered by French and UNOCI forces, Côte d'Ivoire and regional countries on the flow of weapons and other information. Meanwhile, the government and forces nouvelles were instructed to establish a list of armaments in their possession within 45 days.

Finally, the council expressed concern about the use and recruitment of mercenaries on both sides, calling for an end to the practice.

== See also ==
- 2004 French–Ivorian clashes
- Ivorian Civil War
- List of United Nations Security Council Resolutions 1501 to 1600 (2003–2005)
- Opération Licorne
- United Nations Operation in Côte d'Ivoire
