= United Nations Security Council Resolution 1507 =

UN Security Council Resolution 1507
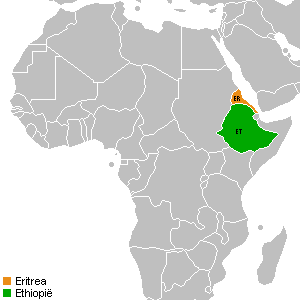
- Eritrea (orange) and Ethiopia (green)
- Date: 12 September 2003
- Meeting no.: 4,822
- Code: S/RES/1507 (Document)
- Subject: The situation between Eritrea and Ethiopia
- Voting summary: 15 voted for; None voted against; None abstained
- Result: Adopted

Security Council composition
- Permanent members: China; France; Russia; United Kingdom; United States
- Non-permanent members: Angola; Bulgaria; Chile; Cameroon; Germany; Guinea; Mexico; Pakistan; Spain; Syria

United Nations Security Council resolution 1507 is a United Nation Security Council resolution that was adopted unanimously on 12 September 2003. After reaffirming all resolutions on the situation between Eritrea and Ethiopia, particularly Resolution 1466 (2003), the Council extended the mandate of the United Nations Mission in Ethiopia and Eritrea (UNMEE) until 15 March 2004.

The resolution was adopted after the Secretary-General Kofi Annan reported that both Ethiopia and Eritrea had failed to initiate a political dialogue, resulting in a "cold peace". Both countries had agreed to recognise the new border demarcation though it had not been implemented.

== Resolution ==
=== Observations ===
The Security Council reaffirmed its support for the peace process between the two countries and for the role played by UNMEE in facilitating the implementation of the Algiers Agreement and decision by the Boundary Commission on the mutual border. The peace process was entering a crucial stage and the Council expressed concern at delays in the demarcation process, particularly the costs of operating UNMEE. There was concern at the continuing humanitarian crisis in both countries and the implications on the peace process. It demanded that both Ethiopia and Eritrea allow UNMEE complete freedom of movement and called for an end to incursions into the Temporary Security Zone (TSZ).

=== Acts ===
The resolution extended UNMEE's mandate at the prevailing troop level of 4,200 in accordance with Resolution 1320 (2000). It called for the demarcation of the boundary to begin as scheduled by the Boundary Commission. Both parties were urged to fulfil their commitments under the Algiers Agreement and co-operate with the Boundary Commission in order for it to fulfil its mandate. The parties were further called upon to co-operate with UNMEE, protect United Nations personnel and establish an air corridor between the capitals of Addis Ababa and Asmara to facilitate the work of the operation and reduce additional costs.

The Council reaffirmed the importance of dialogue between the two countries and the normalisation of their diplomatic relations, while progress would be monitored. It welcomed contributions towards the demarcation process and called for further assistance from the international community.

== See also ==
- Badme
- Eritrean–Ethiopian War
- List of United Nations Security Council Resolutions 1501 to 1600 (2003–2005)
