= United Nations Security Council Resolution 1541 =

United Nations Security Council resolution

UN Security Council Resolution 1541
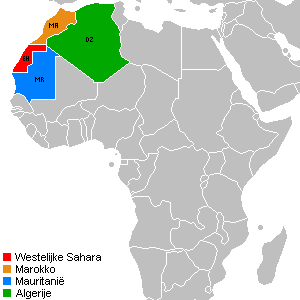
- Western Sahara (red), Morocco (orange), Algeria (green) and Mauritania (blue)
- Date: 29 April 2004
- Meeting no.: 4,957
- Code: S/RES/1541 (Document)
- Subject: The situation concerning Western Sahara
- Voting summary: 15 voted for; None voted against; None abstained
- Result: Adopted

Security Council composition
- Permanent members: China; France; Russia; United Kingdom; United States
- Non-permanent members: Algeria; Angola; Benin; Brazil; Chile; Germany; Pakistan; Philippines; Romania; Spain

United Nations Security Council resolution 1541, adopted unanimously by the Council on 29 April 2004, after recalling all previous resolutions on the situation in Western Sahara, particularly Resolution 1495 (2003), extended the mandate of the United Nations Mission for the Referendum in Western Sahara (MINURSO) until 31 October 2004 with a view to reducing its size.

The Security Council reaffirmed the need for a durable and mutual solution to the Western Sahara problem, which would provide for the self-determination of the people of the territory. It further supported the Baker Plan as a political settlement between Morocco and the Polisario Front. Both parties were urged to co-operate with the Secretary-General Kofi Annan and his Personal Envoy James Baker III.

Finally, the Secretary-General was requested to report on the situation at the end of MINURSO's mandate and to provide an evaluation of the size of MINURSO necessary for it to carry out its mandated tasks, with a view to its gradual reduction.

== See also ==
- Free Zone (region)
- Political status of Western Sahara
- List of United Nations Security Council Resolutions 1501 to 1600 (2003–2005)
- Sahrawi Arab Democratic Republic
- Moroccan Western Sahara Wall
