= United Nations Security Council Resolution 1498 =

UN Security Council Resolution 1498
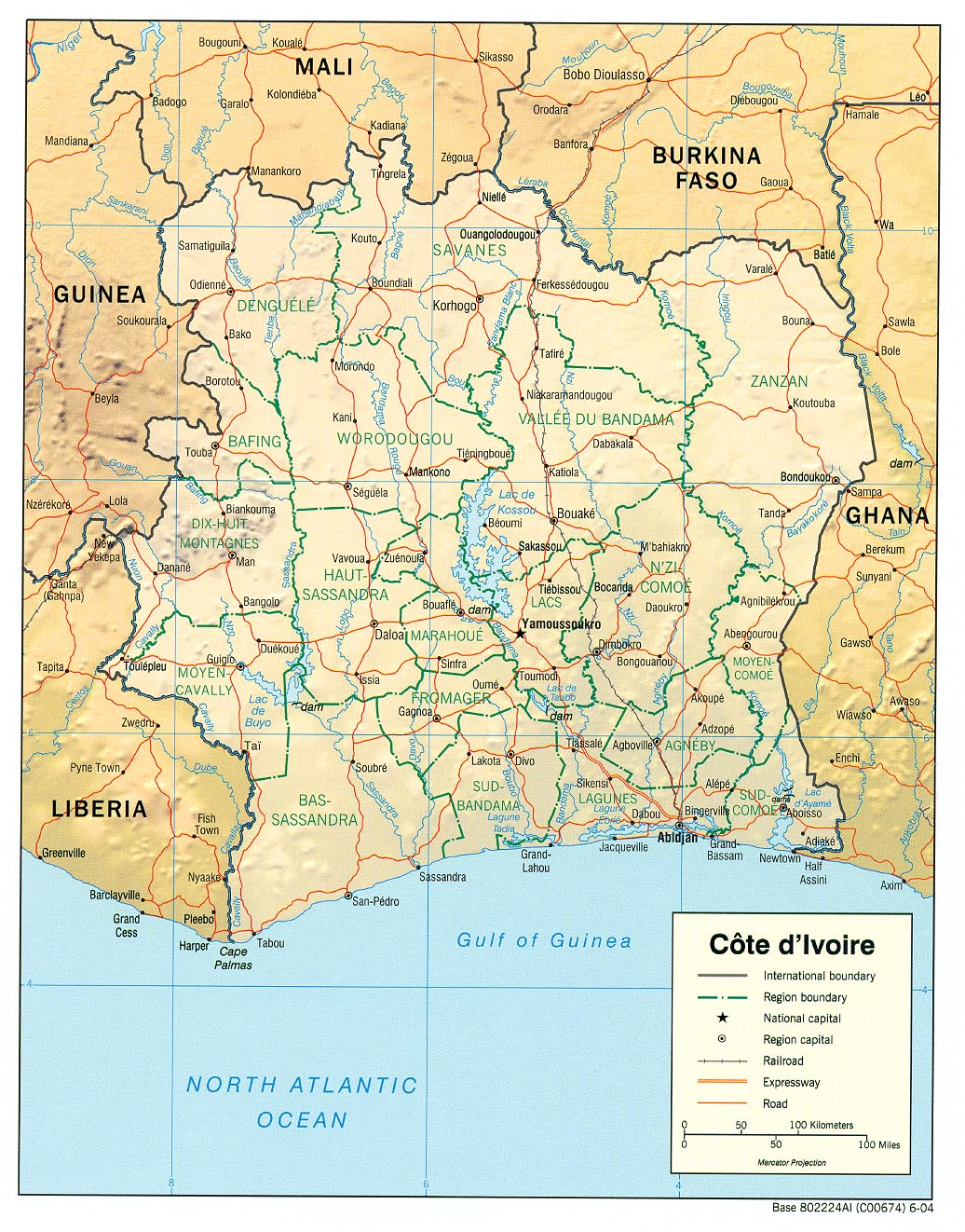
- Côte d'Ivoire
- Date: 4 August 2003
- Meeting no.: 4,804
- Code: S/RES/1498 (Document)
- Subject: The situation in Côte d'Ivoire
- Voting summary: 15 voted for; None voted against; None abstained
- Result: Adopted

Security Council composition
- Permanent members: China; France; Russia; United Kingdom; United States
- Non-permanent members: Angola; Bulgaria; Chile; Cameroon; Germany; Guinea; Mexico; Pakistan; Spain; Syria

United Nations Security Council resolution 1498, adopted unanimously on 4 August 2003, after reaffirming resolutions 1464 (2003) and 1479 (2003) on the situation in Côte d'Ivoire (Ivory Coast), the council renewed authorisation given to the Economic Community of West African States (ECOWAS) and French forces operating in the country to assist the peace process for an additional six months.

The Security Council reaffirmed the sovereignty, territorial integrity and independence of Côte d'Ivoire, in addition to the principles of good-neighbourliness, non-interference and co-operation. It was important that the Government of National Reconciliation extended its authority throughout the country and that a disarmament, demobilisation and reintegration programme was implemented.

The resolution extended the mandate of West African and French forces and requested both to report on the implementation of their mandates. Earlier in 2003, the council had established the United Nations Mission in Côte d'Ivoire.

== See also ==
- Ivorian Civil War
- List of United Nations Security Council Resolutions 1401 to 1500 (2002–2003)
- Opération Licorne
