= United Nations Security Council Resolution 1532 =

UN Security Council Resolution 1532
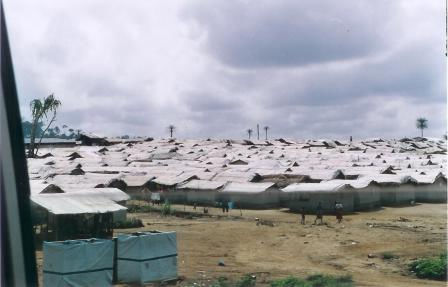
- Camp for internally displaced persons in Liberia
- Date: 12 March 2004
- Meeting no.: 4,925
- Code: S/RES/1532 (Document)
- Subject: The situation in Liberia
- Voting summary: 15 voted for; None voted against; None abstained
- Result: Adopted

Security Council composition
- Permanent members: China; France; Russia; United Kingdom; United States
- Non-permanent members: Algeria; Angola; Benin; Brazil; Chile; Germany; Pakistan; Philippines; Romania; Spain

United Nations Security Council resolution 1532, adopted unanimously on 12 March 2004, after recalling all previous resolutions on the situation in Liberia and West Africa, including Resolution 1521 (2003), the council froze the assets of former president Charles Taylor, his family and other associates.

Charles Taylor, who was exiled from the country, was accused of using misappropriated funds to interfere in Liberian affairs.

== Resolution ==
=== Observations ===
The Security Council was concerned at the actions and policies of former Liberian president Charles Taylor, particularly the depletion and removal of the country's natural resources that undermined the country's transition to democracy. It stressed the need to return the misappropriated funds and assets to Liberia by the international community and expressed concern that Charles Taylor and associates still had control over them.

=== Acts ===
Acting under Chapter VII of the United Nations Charter, the council the assets of Charles Taylor, his wife and his son Charles McArther Emmanuel in addition to associates and members of the regime were frozen, aside from humanitarian exceptions. Other sanctioned individuals were to be determined by the committee established in Resolution 1521. The committee was asked to identify and update assets or resources controlled by Charles Taylor his close associates and to post such information on its website. The measures would be reviewed by 22 December 2004.

Finally, the resolution expressed the council's intention to consider whether or how to make the frozen funds available to benefit the Liberian people, once the new Liberian government had established transparent accounting and auditing mechanisms. Taylor's funds within Liberia were frozen in mid-October 2004.

== See also ==
- List of United Nations Security Council Resolutions 1501 to 1600 (2003–2005)
- Second Liberian Civil War
