= United Nations Security Council Resolution 1464 =

UN Security Council Resolution 1464
- Location of Côte d'Ivoire in West Africa
- Date: 4 February 2003
- Meeting no.: 4,700
- Code: S/RES/1464 (Document)
- Subject: The situation in Côte d'Ivoire
- Voting summary: 15 voted for; None voted against; None abstained
- Result: Adopted

Security Council composition
- Permanent members: China; France; Russia; United Kingdom; United States
- Non-permanent members: Angola; Bulgaria; Chile; Cameroon; Germany; Guinea; Mexico; Pakistan; Spain; Syria

United Nations Security Council resolution 1464, adopted unanimously on 4 February 2003, after reaffirming its commitment to the sovereignty, territorial integrity and unity of Côte d'Ivoire, the council called for the implementation of the peace agreement signed at Linas-Marcoussis to end the civil war in the country.

== Resolution ==
=== Observations ===
The Security Council began by recalling the importance of good-neighbourliness, non-interference and regional co-operation. It noted the decision by the Economic Community of West African States (ECOWAS) to deploy a peacekeeping force to Côte d'Ivoire and supported its efforts to promote a peaceful settlement of the conflict. Challenges remained in the country and the council determined the situation to be a threat to international peace and stability in the region.

=== Acts ===
The agreement signed in Linas-Marcoussis in January 2003 by the Ivorian parties was endorsed by the council, and its provisions relating to the establishment of a government of national reconciliation and a monitoring committee. The Secretary-General Kofi Annan was requested to make recommendations on how the United Nations could support the implementation of the agreement. He had also intended to appoint a Special Representative for Côte d'Ivoire based in the former capital Abidjan.

The resolution condemned violations of human rights and international humanitarian law in the country since 19 September 2002 when the Patriotic Movement of Côte d'Ivoire took control of the second largest town, and welcomed the deployment of ECOWAS and French peacekeeping forces. The forces were authorised, under Chapter VII and Chapter VIII of the United Nations Charter, to use all necessary measures to guarantee their freedom of movement and protect civilians for six months. They were also required to report periodically on the implementation of their mandates.

Finally, all neighbouring states of Côte d'Ivoire were called upon to support the peace process in the country and prevent actions that would undermine its security, such as the proliferation of weapons and movement of armed groups and mercenaries.

== See also ==
- Ivorian Civil War
- List of United Nations Security Council Resolutions 1401 to 1500 (2002–2003)
- Opération Licorne
