= United Nations Security Council Resolution 1678 =

UN Security Council Resolution 1678
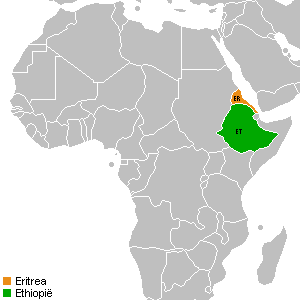
- Ethiopia (green) and Eritrea (orange)
- Date: 15 May 2006
- Meeting no.: 5,437
- Code: S/RES/1678 (Document)
- Subject: The situation between Eritrea and Ethiopia
- Voting summary: 15 voted for; None voted against; None abstained
- Result: Adopted

Security Council composition
- Permanent members: China; France; Russia; United Kingdom; United States
- Non-permanent members: Argentina; Rep. of the Congo; Denmark; Ghana; Greece; Japan; Peru; Qatar; Slovakia; Tanzania

United Nations Security Council Resolution 1678, adopted unanimously on May 15, 2006, after reaffirming all resolutions on the situation between Eritrea and Ethiopia, particularly resolutions 1640 (2005), 1661 (2006) and 1670 (2006), the Council extended the mandate of the United Nations Mission in Ethiopia and Eritrea (UNMEE) until the end of May 2006.

== Resolution ==
=== Observations ===
The Security Council reaffirmed its support for the peace process between the two countries and the full implementation of the Algiers Agreement. It welcomed progress made at a meeting of the Eritrea-Ethiopia Boundary Commission (EEBC) in March 2006.

=== Acts ===
Resolution 1678 renewed the mandate of UNMEE until May 31, 2006, and again demanded that Ethiopia and Eritrea comply with Resolution 1640. All states were called upon to provide contributions to the trust fund and support UNMEE.

Furthermore, Council members decided that, in the event of non-compliance with Resolution 1640, and in light of the outcome of the EEBC meeting on May 17, 2006, adjustments would be made to the mandate and troop level of UNMEE by the end of May 2006.

Finally, the Secretary-General Kofi Annan was instructed to report on compliance with Resolution 1640 within seven days and to also provide suggestions on adjusting UNMEE's mandate to support the demarcation process.

== See also ==
- Badme
- Eritrean–Ethiopian War
- List of United Nations Security Council Resolutions 1601 to 1700 (2005–2006)
