= United Nations Security Council Resolution 1692 =

UN Security Council Resolution 1692
- Burundi
- Date: 30 June 2006
- Meeting no.: 5,479
- Code: S/RES/1692 (Document)
- Subject: The situation in Burundi
- Voting summary: 15 voted for; None voted against; None abstained
- Result: Adopted

Security Council composition
- Permanent members: China; France; Russia; United Kingdom; United States
- Non-permanent members: Argentina; Rep. of the Congo; Denmark; Ghana; Greece; Japan; Peru; Qatar; Slovakia; Tanzania

United Nations Security Council Resolution 1692, adopted unanimously on June 30, 2006, after recalling resolutions on the situation in Burundi and the African Great Lakes region, particularly resolutions 1650 (2005) and 1669 (2006), the Council extended the mandate of the United Nations Operation in Burundi (ONUB) until December 31, 2006.

== Resolution ==
=== Observations ===
The Security Council praised the Burundian people for the completion of the transitional period where authority had been transferred to democratically elected government and institutions. The resolution welcomed negotiations between the Palipehutu and Burundian government, facilitated by South Africa. It recognised that, although there was an improvement in the security situation, there were still "factors of instability" present in Burundi and the Great Lakes region of Africa.

=== Acts ===
Acting under Chapter VII of the United Nations Charter, the Security Council extended the mandate of ONUB until the end of 2006. It also extended the temporary redeployment of military and civilian police personnel from the ONUB to the United Nations Mission in the Democratic Republic of the Congo (MONUC) until September 30, 2006.

Finally, Council members welcomed the intention of the Secretary-General Kofi Annan to establish the United Nations Integrated Office in Burundi, to succeed ONUB.

== See also ==
- Burundi Civil War
- List of United Nations Security Council Resolutions 1601 to 1700 (2005–2006)
