= United Nations Security Council Resolution 1657 =

UN Security Council Resolution 1657
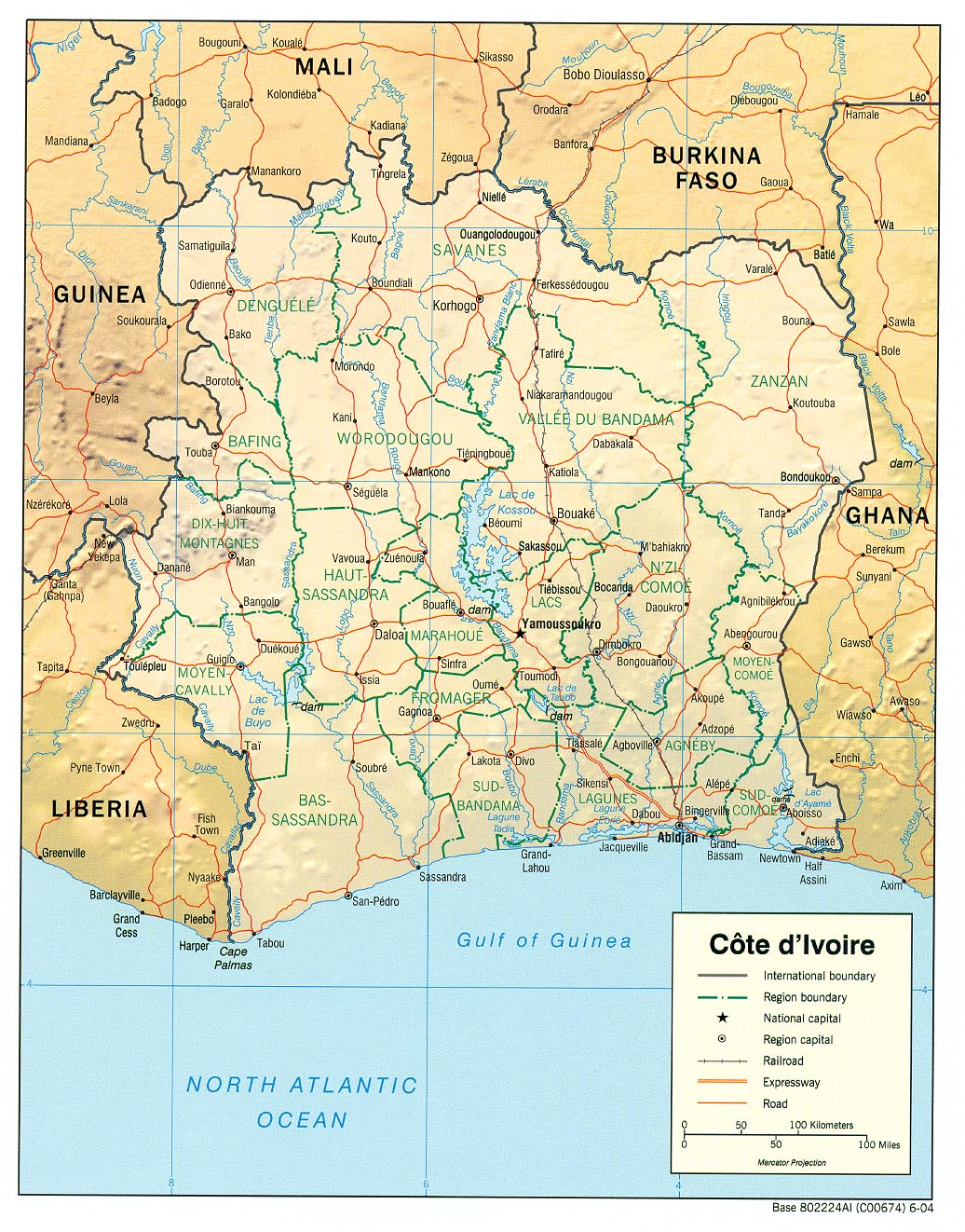
- Côte d'Ivoire
- Date: 6 February 2006
- Meeting no.: 5,366
- Code: S/RES/1657 (Document)
- Subject: The situation in Côte d'Ivoire
- Voting summary: 15 voted for; None voted against; None abstained
- Result: Adopted

Security Council composition
- Permanent members: China; France; Russia; United Kingdom; United States
- Non-permanent members: Argentina; Rep. of the Congo; Denmark; Ghana; Greece; Japan; Peru; Qatar; Slovakia; Tanzania

United Nations Security Council Resolution 1657, adopted unanimously on February 6, 2006, after recalling previous resolutions on the situation in Côte d'Ivoire (Ivory Coast), including resolutions 1609 (2005), 1626 (2005) and 1652 (2005), the Council authorised a temporary redeployment of troops from the United Nations Mission in Liberia (UNMIL) to the United Nations Operation in Côte d'Ivoire (UNOCI).

== Resolution ==
=== Observations ===
The Security Council was very concerned about the ongoing political crisis in Côte d'Ivoire, and obstacles to the peace process from all sides. It noted that the mandate of UNMIL was to expire on March 31, 2006, and that the situation in Côte d'Ivoire continued to pose a threat to international peace and security.

=== Acts ===
Under Chapter VII powers, the Council authorised a temporary redeployment of one infantry company from UNMIL to UNOCI until March 31, 2006 in order to provide extra security and perform tasks carried out by UNOCI. The measure would be renewed within 30 days if necessary, with Council members keeping additional redeployments under review.

== See also ==
- First Ivorian Civil War
- List of United Nations Security Council Resolutions 1601 to 1700 (2005–2006)
- Opération Licorne
- United Nations Operation in Côte d'Ivoire
