= United Nations Security Council Resolution 1682 =

UN Security Council Resolution 1682
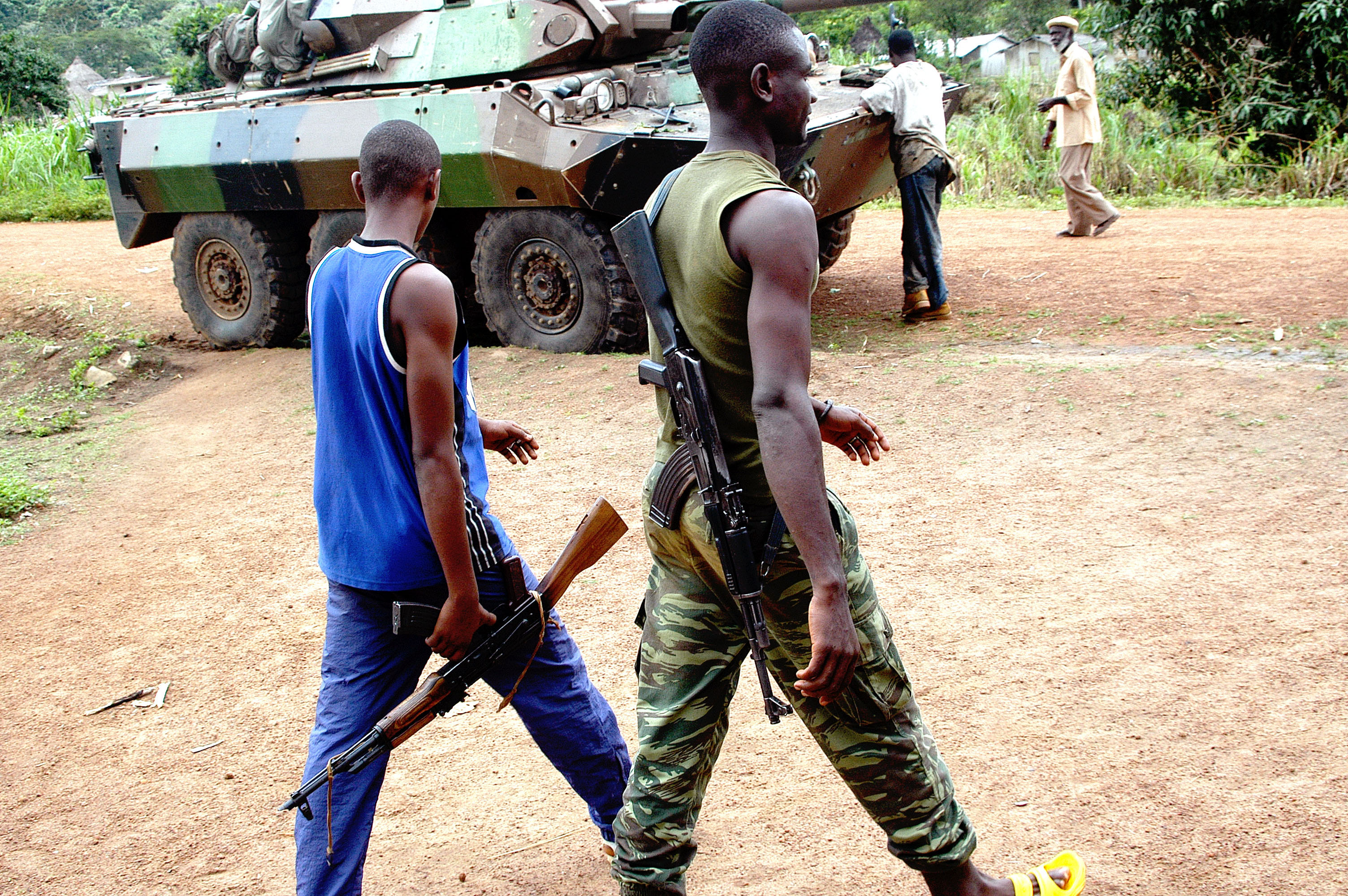
- Rebels in Côte d'Ivoire
- Date: 2 June 2006
- Meeting no.: 5,451
- Code: S/RES/1682 (Document)
- Subject: The situation in Côte d'Ivoire
- Voting summary: 15 voted for; None voted against; None abstained
- Result: Adopted

Security Council composition
- Permanent members: China; France; Russia; United Kingdom; United States
- Non-permanent members: Argentina; Rep. of the Congo; Denmark; Ghana; Greece; Japan; Peru; Qatar; Slovakia; Tanzania

United Nations Security Council Resolution 1682, adopted unanimously on June 2, 2006, after recalling previous resolutions on the situation in Côte d'Ivoire (Ivory Coast) and the subregion, including resolutions 1652 (2005) and 1667 (2005), the Council authorised an increase in the strength of the United Nations Operation in Côte d'Ivoire (UNOCI).

== Details ==
The Security Council expressed concern at the continuing crisis in Côte d'Ivoire, obstacles to the peace process from all sides and its threat to the region.

Acting under Chapter VII of the United Nations Charter, the Council noted the recommendations of the Secretary-General Kofi Annan and authorised an increase in the strength of UNOCI until December 15, 2006 of up to 1,500 additional personnel, including 1,025 military and 475 police personnel.

The resolution declared the Council's readiness to keep the situation under review.

== See also ==
- First Ivorian Civil War
- List of United Nations Security Council Resolutions 1601 to 1700 (2005–2006)
- Opération Licorne
