= United Nations Security Council Resolution 1697 =

UN Security Council Resolution 1697
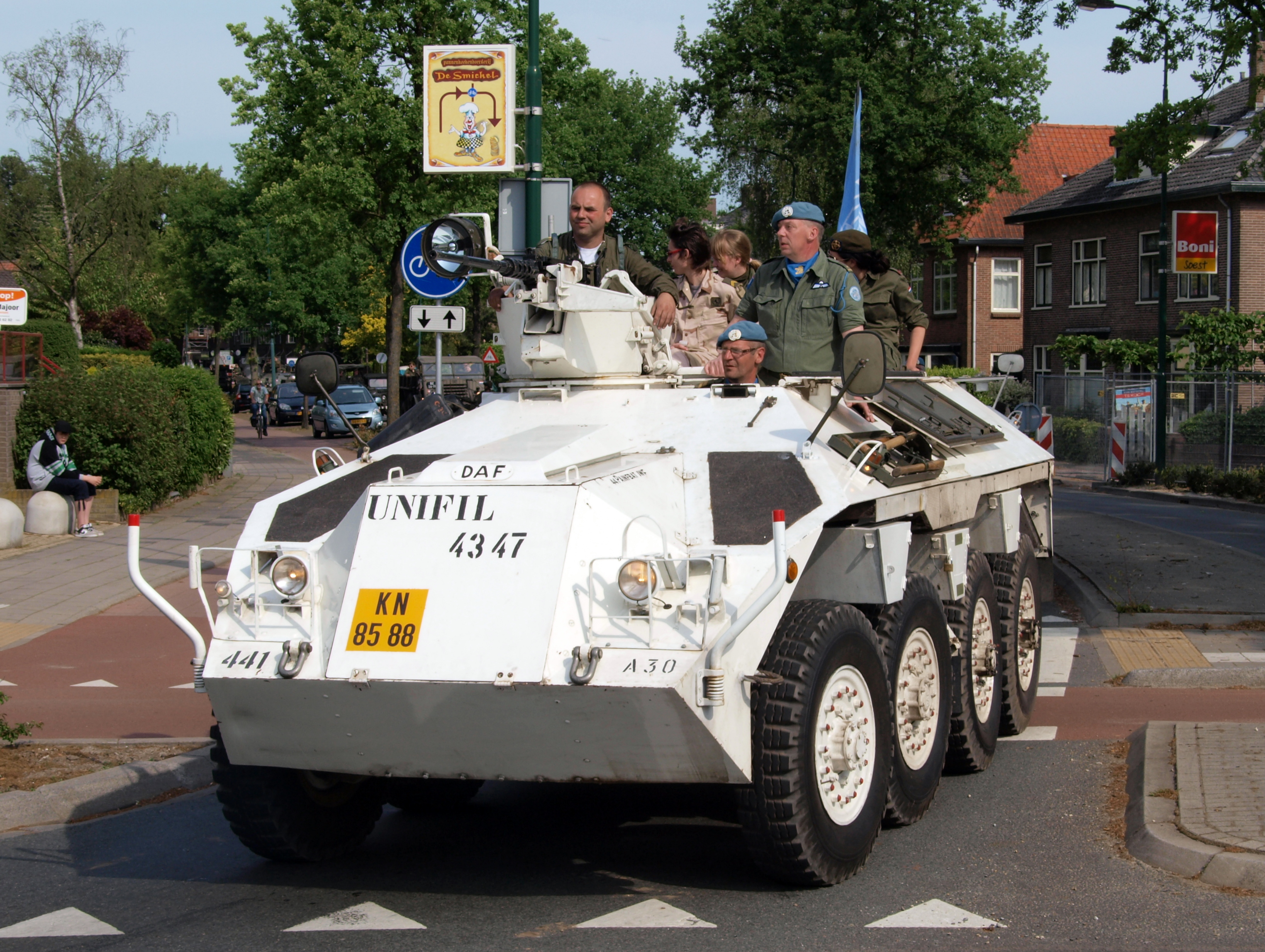
- UNIFIL vehicle
- Date: 31 July 2006
- Meeting no.: 5,501
- Code: S/RES/1697 (Document)
- Subject: The situation in the Middle East
- Voting summary: 15 voted for; None voted against; None abstained
- Result: Adopted

Security Council composition
- Permanent members: China; France; Russia; United Kingdom; United States
- Non-permanent members: Argentina; Rep. of the Congo; Denmark; Ghana; Greece; Japan; Peru; Qatar; Slovakia; Tanzania

United Nations Security Council Resolution 1697, adopted unanimously on July 31, 2006, after recalling previous resolutions on Israel and Lebanon, including resolutions 425 (1978), 426 (1978) and 1655 (2006), the Council extended the mandate of the United Nations Interim Force in Lebanon (UNIFIL) for a term of one month, expiring on August 31, 2006.

== Details ==
The resolution's language urging respect for the Interim Force was in response to continuing concern for its safety, especially from the hostilities in the region due to the conflict between Israel and Lebanon along the border, since July 12, 2006.

The Council acknowledged a request from the Lebanese government to extend UNIFIL for a further six months, but given the observations of the Secretary-General Kofi Annan in his report of the continuing hostilities, its mandate was only renewed for one month, pending the consideration of future options for southern Lebanon.

Meanwhile, it urged both parties to avoid actions endangering UNIFIL personnel, further calling on Israel and Lebanon to allow the operation to resupply its positions and undertake other measures deemed necessary to protect the Interim Force.

== See also ==
- 2000–2006 Shebaa Farms conflict
- 2006 Lebanon War
- Blue Line
- Israeli–Lebanese conflict
- List of United Nations Security Council Resolutions 1601 to 1700 (2005–2006)
