= United Nations Security Council Resolution 1712 =

UN Security Council Resolution 1712
- Flag of Liberia
- Date: 29 September 2006
- Meeting no.: 5,542
- Code: S/RES/1712 (Document)
- Subject: The situation in Liberia
- Voting summary: 15 voted for; None voted against; None abstained
- Result: Adopted

Security Council composition
- Permanent members: China; France; Russia; United Kingdom; United States
- Non-permanent members: Argentina; Rep. of the Congo; Denmark; Ghana; Greece; Japan; Peru; Qatar; Slovakia; Tanzania

United Nations Security Council Resolution 1712, adopted unanimously on 29 September 2006, after recalling all previous resolutions on the situation in Liberia and West Africa, particularly resolutions 1509 (2003), 1667 (2006) and 1694 (2006), the Council extended the mandate of the United Nations Mission in Liberia (UNMIL) for six months until 31 March 2007.

== Resolution ==
=== Observations ===
The Council welcomed steps taken by the Liberian government to tackle corruption, and initiatives taken by UNMIL, the Economic Community of West African States (ECOWAS) and African Union to support the peace process in Liberia; financial assistance from the international community was also welcomed.

The resolution noted remaining challenges in completing the reintegration and repatriation of ex-combatants, and the re-structuring of the security sector. Meanwhile, UNMIL had deployed in border areas and there was a need for continued support for the Special Court for Sierra Leone.

=== Acts ===
Acting under Chapter VII of the United Nations Charter, the Security Council renewed UNMIL's mandate until the end of March 2007, reaffirming its intention to redeploy troops between UNMIL and the United Nations Operation in Côte d'Ivoire (UNOCI) in accordance with Resolution 1609 (2005) if necessary.

Meanwhile, the Secretary-General Kofi Annan's intention to gradually withdraw UNMIL's troop contingent was supported. He was asked to keep the Council updated on the restructuring of the security sector, the reintegration of former combatants, political and ethnic reconciliation, the consolidation of state authority throughout Liberia, judicial reform, government control over the country's natural resources, and the establishment of a stable and secure environment for economic growth. In this context, the Liberian government was required to take steps to achieve benchmarks in the key aforementioned areas.

== See also ==
- List of United Nations Security Council Resolutions 1701 to 1800 (2006–2008)
- Second Liberian Civil War
