= United Nations Security Council Resolution 1670 =

UN Security Council Resolution 1670
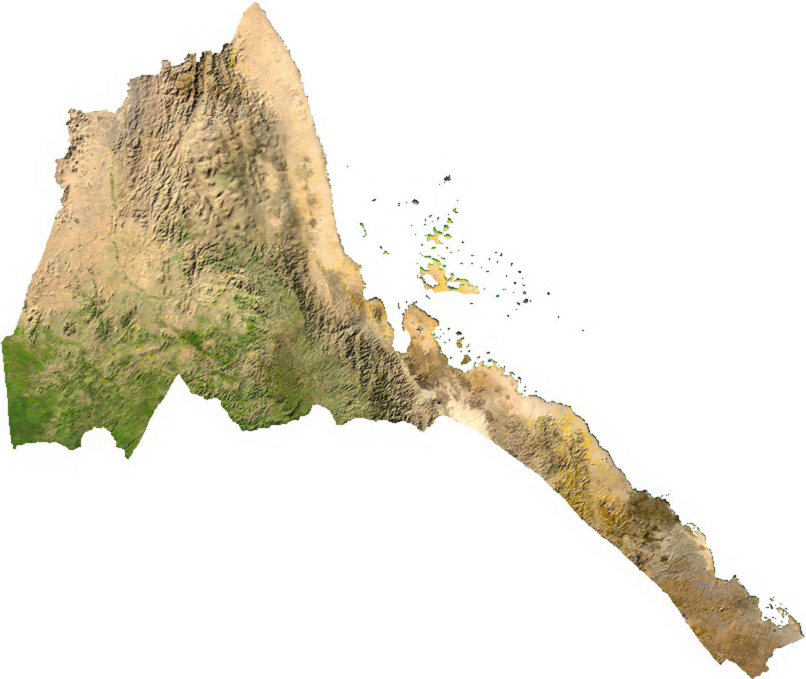
- Satellite image of Eritrea
- Date: 13 April 2006
- Meeting no.: 5,410
- Code: S/RES/1670 (Document)
- Subject: The situation between Eritrea and Ethiopia
- Voting summary: 15 voted for; None voted against; None abstained
- Result: Adopted

Security Council composition
- Permanent members: China; France; Russia; United Kingdom; United States
- Non-permanent members: Argentina; Rep. of the Congo; Denmark; Ghana; Greece; Japan; Peru; Qatar; Slovakia; Tanzania

United Nations Security Council Resolution 1670, adopted unanimously on April 13, 2006, after reaffirming all resolutions on the situation between Eritrea and Ethiopia, particularly resolutions 1640 (2005) and 1661 (2006), the Council extended the mandate of the United Nations Mission in Ethiopia and Eritrea (UNMEE) for a period of one month until May 15, 2006.

== Resolution ==
=== Observations ===
The Security Council reaffirmed its support for the peace process between the two countries and the full implementation of the Algiers Agreement. It stressed that peace in the region could not be achieved without the full demarcation of the mutual border between Eritrea and Ethiopia.

Council members also reaffirmed their commitment to ensure that both parties permitted UNMEE to work freely and provide necessary access, assistance, support and protection during the course of its mandate; the demarcation of the border could not take place without UNMEE's freedom of movement, which had been under "unacceptable restriction".

=== Acts ===
Extending UNMEE's mandate for a period of one month as a matter of technicality pending further discussions on its future, the Council demanded that Ethiopia and Eritrea fully comply with Resolution 1640. Member States were called upon to provide contributions to a trust fund established by Resolution 1177 (1998) and support for UNMEE.

The resolution noted that if the parties had not fully complied with Resolution 1640 by May 2006, the Council would review the status of UNMEE, including the transformation to an observer mission.

== See also ==
- Badme
- Eritrean–Ethiopian War
- List of United Nations Security Council Resolutions 1601 to 1700 (2005–2006)
