= United Nations Security Council Resolution 1731 =

UN Security Council Resolution 1731
- Liberia
- Date: 20 December 2006
- Meeting no.: 5,602
- Code: S/RES/1731 (Document)
- Subject: The situation in Liberia
- Voting summary: 15 voted for; None voted against; None abstained
- Result: Adopted

Security Council composition
- Permanent members: China; France; Russia; United Kingdom; United States
- Non-permanent members: Argentina; Rep. of the Congo; Denmark; Ghana; Greece; Japan; Peru; Qatar; Slovakia; Tanzania

United Nations Security Council Resolution 1731, adopted unanimously on December 20, 2006, after recalling all previous resolutions on the situations in Liberia and West Africa, the Council extended arms and travel embargoes on the country for one year and a ban on the sale of diamonds for a period of six months.

== Resolution ==
=== Observations ===
The Security Council reiterated its decision not to renew timber sanctions in Resolution 1521 (2003), and urged the country to implement the forestry reform law. It welcomed the Liberian government's co-operation with the Kimberley Process Certification Scheme.

There was a need for Liberian security forces to assume greater responsibility for national security. Council members determined that there was little progress in meeting the demands of resolutions 1521 and 1532 (2004). The situation in Liberia continued to constitute a threat to international peace and security.

=== Acts ===
Acting under Chapter VII of the United Nations Charter, the Council extended the arms embargo and travel restrictions for a period of twelve months, and restrictions on the sale of diamonds and timber for a period of six months. The measures would be reviewed at the request of the Liberian government. The government was encouraged to take up the offer of the United Nations Mission in Liberia (UNMIL) of joint forestry patrols.

An expert panel appointed in Resolution 1689 (2006) overseeing the implementation of sanctions against the country had its mandate extended until June 20, 2007. It was required to report back to the Council by June 6, 2007. All states were required to co-operate with the panel. Meanwhile, the Kimberley Process was instructed to assess progress made by Liberia with respect to joining the Scheme.

== See also ==
- List of United Nations Security Council Resolutions 1701 to 1800 (2006–2008)
- Second Liberian Civil War
