= United Nations Security Council Resolution 1666 =

UN Security Council Resolution 1666
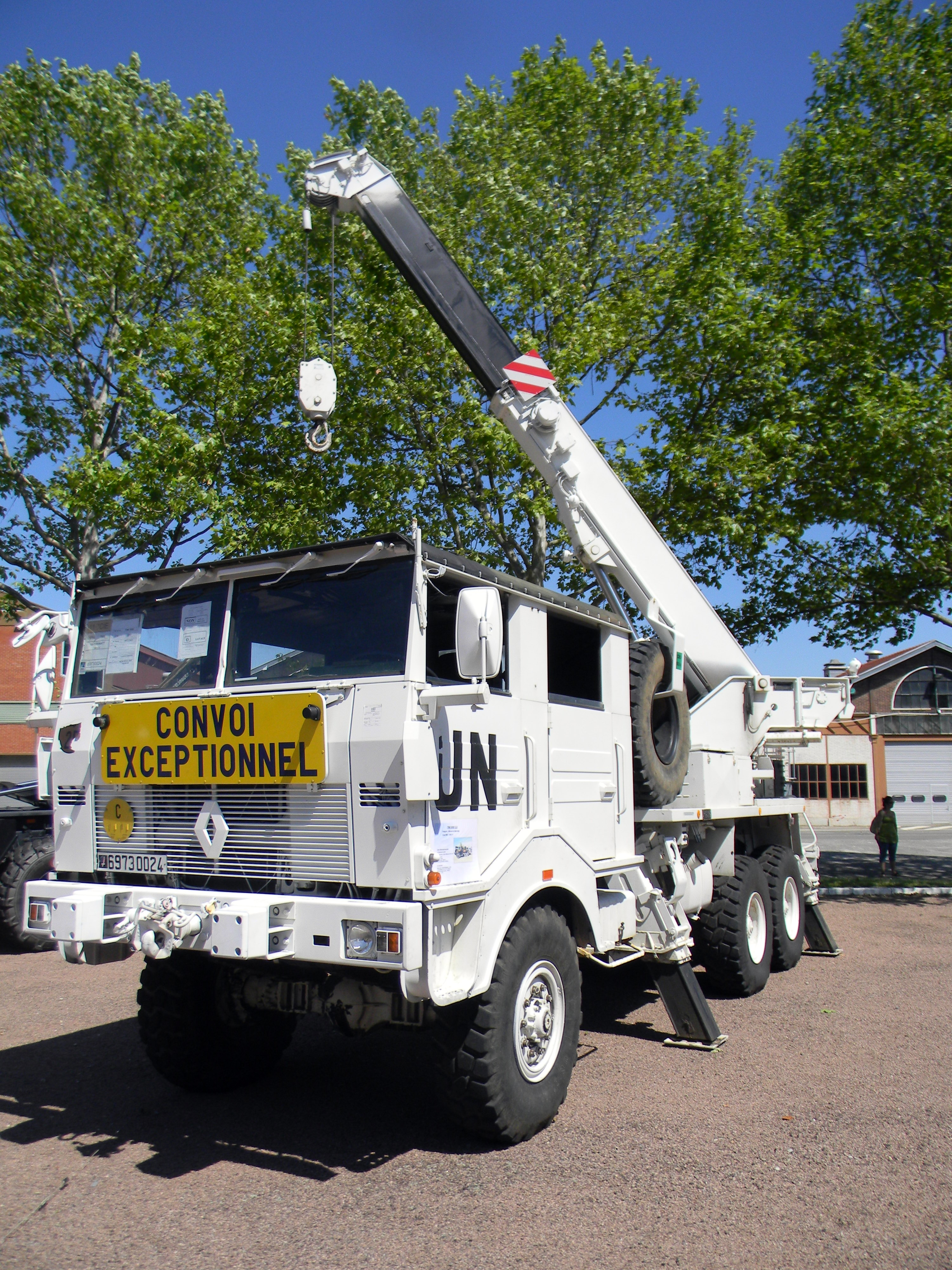
- UN vehicle
- Date: 31 March 2006
- Meeting no.: 5,405
- Code: S/RES/1666 (Document)
- Subject: The situation in Georgia
- Voting summary: 15 voted for; None voted against; None abstained
- Result: Adopted

Security Council composition
- Permanent members: China; France; Russia; United Kingdom; United States
- Non-permanent members: Argentina; Rep. of the Congo; Denmark; Ghana; Greece; Japan; Peru; Qatar; Slovakia; Tanzania

United Nations Security Council Resolution 1666, adopted unanimously on March 31, 2006, after reaffirming all resolutions on Abkhazia and Georgia, particularly Resolution 1615 (2005), the Council extended the mandate of the United Nations Observer Mission in Georgia (UNOMIG) until October 15, 2006.

== Resolution ==
=== Observations ===
The Security Council supported the efforts of the Secretary-General Kofi Annan, his Special Representative, Russia and Group of Friends of the Secretary-General and the Organisation for Security and Co-operation in Europe (OSCE). It stressed the importance of co-operation between UNOMIG and the Commonwealth of Independent States (CIS) peacekeeping force in Georgia.

=== Acts ===
The resolution reaffirmed the Council's commitment to the sovereignty and territorial integrity of Georgia within its internationally recognised borders. Furthermore, it reaffirmed the need for a comprehensive settlement based on the principles contained within the "Paper on Basic Principles for the Distribution of Competencies between Tbilisi and Sukhumi", calling on both Georgia and Abkhazia to use all mechanisms contained in previous Security Council resolutions to come to a peaceful settlement. The Council supported efforts by both sides to engage in economic co-operation.

The Council, addressing both sides, urged for agreements concerning non-violence and the return of refugees and internally displaced persons in the Gali region and called on them both to follow on their readiness for a high-level meeting. Council members asked Georgia to address security concerns by the Abkhaz side, while the Abkhaz side urged to address the security and human rights concerns of refugees and internally displaced persons in the Gali region.

The text of the resolution went on to urge both sides to ensure the safety and freedom of movement of UNOMIG, the CIS force and others. Efforts to implement the zero-tolerance sexual exploitation policy were welcomed and the mandate of UNOMIG was extended until October 15, 2006. The Secretary-General was required to report on the situation regularly.

== See also ==
- Georgian–Abkhazian conflict
- List of United Nations Security Council Resolutions 1601 to 1700 (2005–2006)
- United Nations resolutions on Abkhazia
