= United Nations Security Council Resolution 1601 =

UN Security Council Resolution 1601
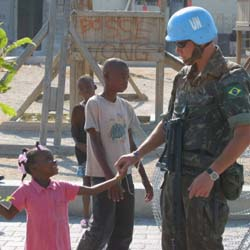
- MINUSTAH peacekeeper in Haiti
- Date: 31 May 2005
- Meeting no.: 5,192
- Code: S/RES/1601 (Document)
- Subject: The situation in Haiti
- Voting summary: 15 voted for; None voted against; None abstained
- Result: Adopted

Security Council composition
- Permanent members: China; France; Russia; United Kingdom; United States
- Non-permanent members: Algeria; Argentina; Benin; Brazil; Denmark; Greece; Japan; Philippines; Romania; Tanzania

United Nations Security Council Resolution 1601, adopted unanimously on 31 May 2005, after recalling resolutions 1529 (2004), 1542 (2004) and 1576 (2004) on the situation in Haiti, the Council extended the mandate of the United Nations Stabilisation Mission in Haiti (MINUSTAH) until 24 June 2005.

The Council determined the situation in the country to be a threat to international peace and security in the region. Acting under Chapter VII of the United Nations Charter, the Council extended the mandate of MINUSTAH, to be renewed for further periods. It also welcomed a report by the Secretary-General Kofi Annan which stated that the peacekeeping operation had made progress towards an environment suitable for political transition, though challenges remained.

== See also ==
- 2004 Haitian coup d'état
- List of United Nations Security Council Resolutions 1601 to 1700 (2005–2006)
