= United Nations Security Council Resolution 1661 =

UN Security Council Resolution 1661
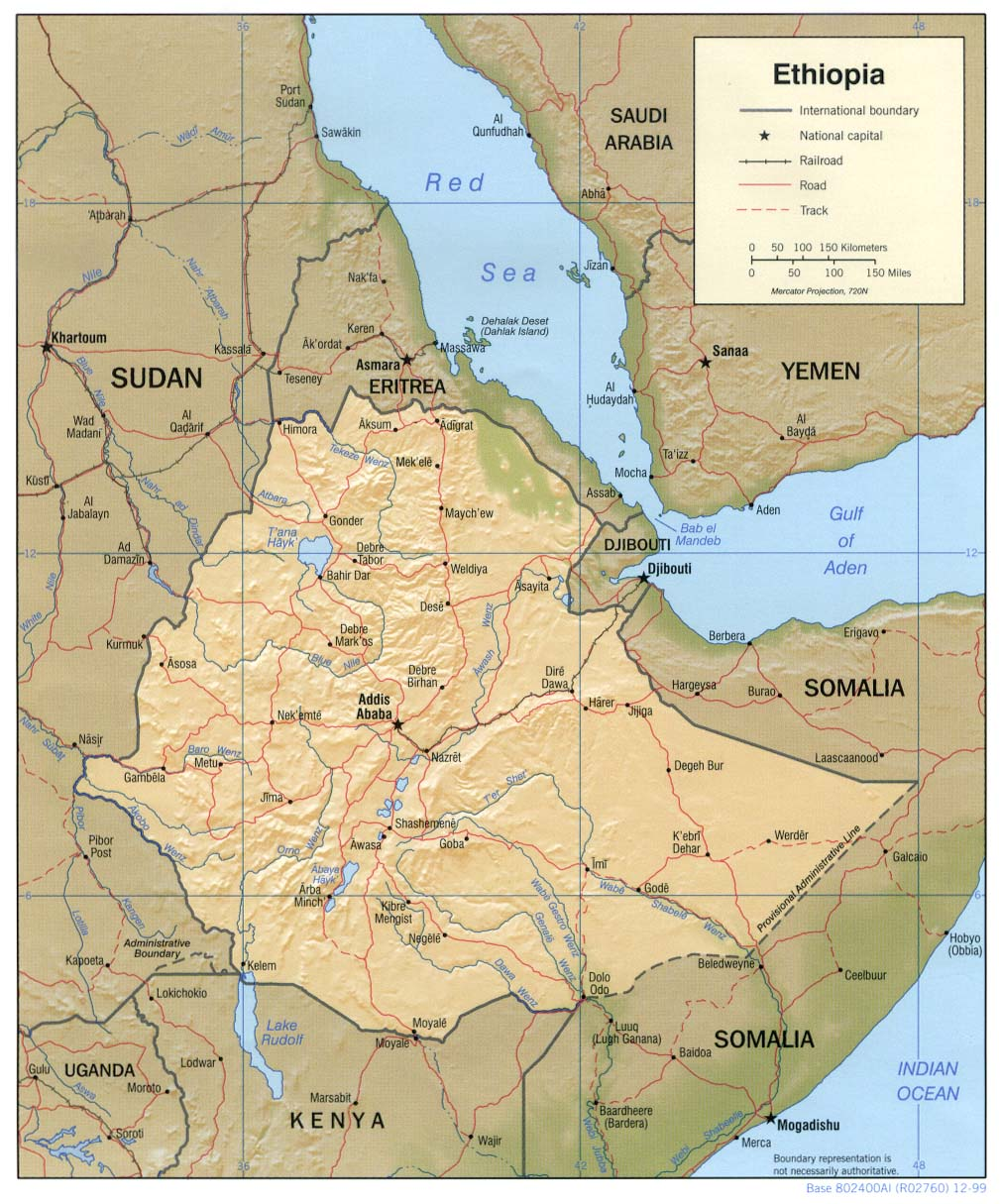
- Ethiopia and Eritrea
- Date: 14 March 2006
- Meeting no.: 5,384
- Code: S/RES/1661 (Document)
- Subject: The situation between Eritrea and Ethiopia
- Voting summary: 15 voted for; None voted against; None abstained
- Result: Adopted

Security Council composition
- Permanent members: China; France; Russia; United Kingdom; United States
- Non-permanent members: Argentina; Rep. of the Congo; Denmark; Ghana; Greece; Japan; Peru; Qatar; Slovakia; Tanzania

United Nations Security Council Resolution 1661, adopted unanimously on March 14, 2006, after reaffirming all resolutions on the situation between Eritrea and Ethiopia, particularly resolutions 1622 (2005) and 1640 (2005), the Council extended the mandate of the United Nations Mission in Ethiopia and Eritrea (UNMEE) for a period of one month until April 15, 2006.

== Details ==
The Security Council reaffirmed its support for the peace process between the two countries and the full implementation of the Algiers Agreement. It stressed that peace in the region could not be achieved without the full demarcation of the mutual border between Eritrea and Ethiopia.

Council members also reaffirmed their commitment to ensure that both parties permitted UNMEE to work freely and provide necessary access, assistance, support and protection during the course of its mandate; the demarcation of the border could not take place without UNMEE's freedom of movement.

Extending UNMEE's mandate for a period of one month as a matter of technicality pending further discussions on its future, the Council demanded that Ethiopia and Eritrea fully comply with Resolution 1640.

== See also ==
- Badme
- Eritrean–Ethiopian War
- List of United Nations Security Council Resolutions 1601 to 1700 (2005–2006)
