= United Nations Security Council Resolution 1646 =

UN Security Council Resolution 1646
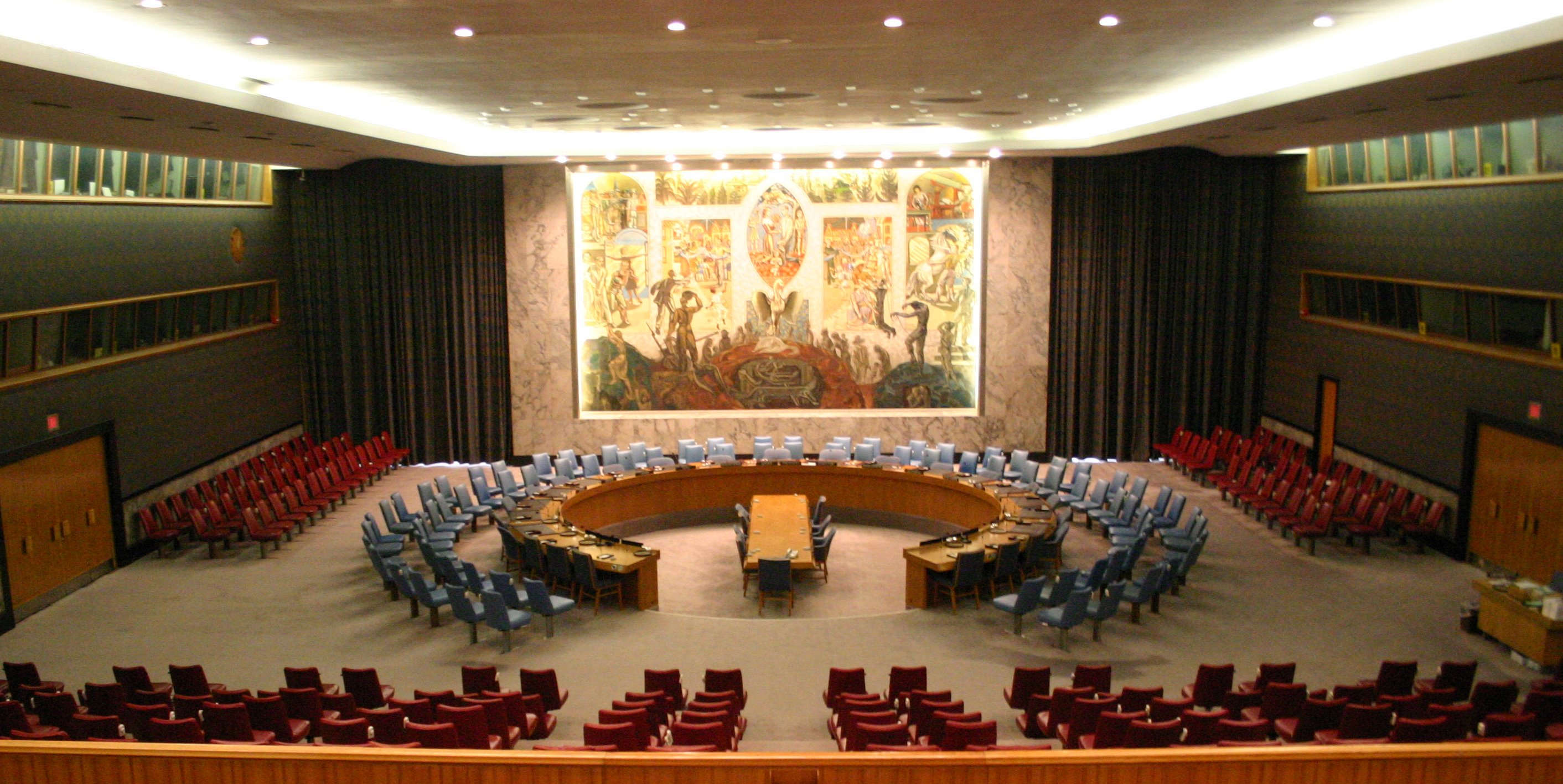
- United Nations Security Council
- Date: 20 December 2005
- Meeting no.: 5,335
- Code: S/RES/1646 (Document)
- Subject: Post-conflict peacebuilding
- Voting summary: 13 voted for; None voted against; 2 abstained
- Result: Adopted

Security Council composition
- Permanent members: China; France; Russia; United Kingdom; United States
- Non-permanent members: Algeria; Argentina; Benin; Brazil; Denmark; Greece; Japan; Philippines; Romania; Tanzania

United Nations Security Council Resolution 1646, adopted on 20 December 2005, after recalling Resolution 1645 (2005) adopted immediately prior to this resolution, the council addressed the membership of the United Nations Peacebuilding Commission.

The security council decided that the five permanent members of the security council–China, France, Russia, the United Kingdom and United States–and two non-permanent members were to participate in the Organisational Committee of the Peacebuilding Commission. Furthermore, the resolution stated that the annual report of the Peacebuilding Commission would also be submitted to the council for debate.

Resolution 1646 was adopted by 13 votes in favour to none against and two abstentions from Argentina and Brazil, both of which had concerns about the membership of the Peacebuilding Commission and the involvement of the security council.

== See also ==
- Conflict resolution
- List of United Nations Security Council Resolutions 1601 to 1700 (2005–2006)
- Peacekeeping
- Peacemaking
- United Nations Peacebuilding Fund
