= United Nations Security Council Resolution 1687 =

UN Security Council Resolution 1687
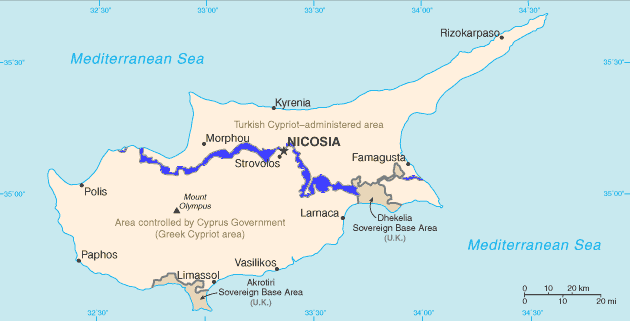
- Buffer zone in Cyprus
- Date: 15 June 2006
- Meeting no.: 5,465
- Code: S/RES/1687 (Document)
- Subject: The situation in Cyprus
- Voting summary: 15 voted for; None voted against; None abstained
- Result: Adopted

Security Council composition
- Permanent members: China; France; Russia; United Kingdom; United States
- Non-permanent members: Argentina; Rep. of the Congo; Denmark; Ghana; Greece; Japan; Peru; Qatar; Slovakia; Tanzania

United Nations Security Council Resolution 1687, adopted unanimously on June 15, 2006, after reaffirming all resolutions on the situation in Cyprus, particularly Resolution 1251 (1999), the Council extended the mandate of the United Nations Peacekeeping Force in Cyprus (UNFICYP) for six months until December 15, 2006.

== Resolution ==
=== Observations ===
The Security Council called on both The Republic of Cyprus and the occupying administration in Northern Cyprus to urgently address the humanitarian issue of missing persons. It noted the Secretary-General Kofi Annan's assessment that the security situation was stable and the situation along the Green Line was calm.

Both sides were urged to refrain from actions that would increase tension, particularly developments in the Dherinia area relating to unauthorised construction in the buffer zone and restrictions on UNFICYP personnel at some checkpoints. There was also concern at construction activity in relating to an additional crossing Ledra Street, and further negotiations were called for.

The Council regretted that "the gap between words and deeds" remained "too great" for the Secretary-General to fully resume his mission in Cyprus, and welcomed his efforts to encourage the resumption of bicommunal contacts between Greek and Turkish Cypriots. Furthermore, demining progress in the Nicosia area was welcomed along with UNFICYP's efforts to extend demining into Turkish Forces minefields.

The resolution went on to welcome the efforts of the Special Representative of the Secretary-General, the fact that over ten million crossings of Greek and Turkish Cypriots had taken place, the contributions of Greece and Cyprus to the peacekeeping operation, and efforts relating to the prevention of HIV/AIDS in the peacekeeping mission.

=== Acts ===
Extending UNFICYP's mandate, the resolution requested the Secretary-General to report to the Council on the implementation of the current resolution, further endorsing UNFICYP's efforts to implement the sexual exploitation policy. It urged the Turkish Cypriot side to restore the military status quo that existed at Strovilia prior to June 30, 2000.

The Council called for bicommunal discussions at a technical level to take place, and requested the Secretary-General to report by December 1, 2006 on progress made.

== See also ==
- Annan Plan for Cyprus
- Cyprus problem
- List of United Nations Security Council Resolutions 1601 to 1700 (2005–2006)
- United Nations Buffer Zone in Cyprus
- Turkish invasion of Cyprus
