= United Nations Security Council Resolution 1632 =

UN Security Council Resolution 1632
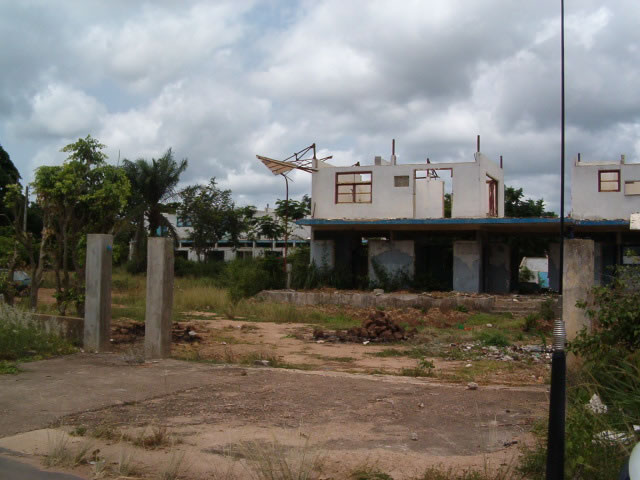
- War damaged medical centre in Bouaké (2005)
- Date: 18 October 2005
- Meeting no.: 5,283
- Code: S/RES/1632 (Document)
- Subject: The situation in Côte d'Ivoire
- Voting summary: 15 voted for; None voted against; None abstained
- Result: Adopted

Security Council composition
- Permanent members: China; France; Russia; United Kingdom; United States
- Non-permanent members: Algeria; Argentina; Benin; Brazil; Denmark; Greece; Japan; Philippines; Romania; Tanzania

United Nations Security Council resolution 1632, adopted unanimously on 18 October 2005, after recalling previous resolutions on the situation in Côte d'Ivoire (Ivory Coast), including resolutions 1572 (2004), 1584 (2005) and 1609 (2005), the Council extended the mandate of a three-person group monitoring the control of weapons until 15 December 2005.

== Resolution ==
=== Observations ===
The Council welcomed political efforts by the Secretary-General Kofi Annan, the African Union and Economic Community of West African States (ECOWAS) to restore peace and stability in Côte d'Ivoire. It determined that the situation in the country remained a threat to international peace and security in the region.

=== Acts ===
The resolution, under Chapter VII of the United Nations Charter, extended the mandate of the expert group monitoring the flow of weapons until 15 December 2005 and for the Secretary-General to take necessary administrative measures to facilitate the renewal. Finally, the expert group was required to submit a brief report concerning the implementation of measures imposed in Resolution 1572 before 1 December 2005.

== See also ==
- Ivorian Civil War
- List of United Nations Security Council Resolutions 1601 to 1700 (2005–2006)
- United Nations Operation in Côte d'Ivoire
