= United Nations Security Council Resolution 1642 =

UN Security Council Resolution 1642
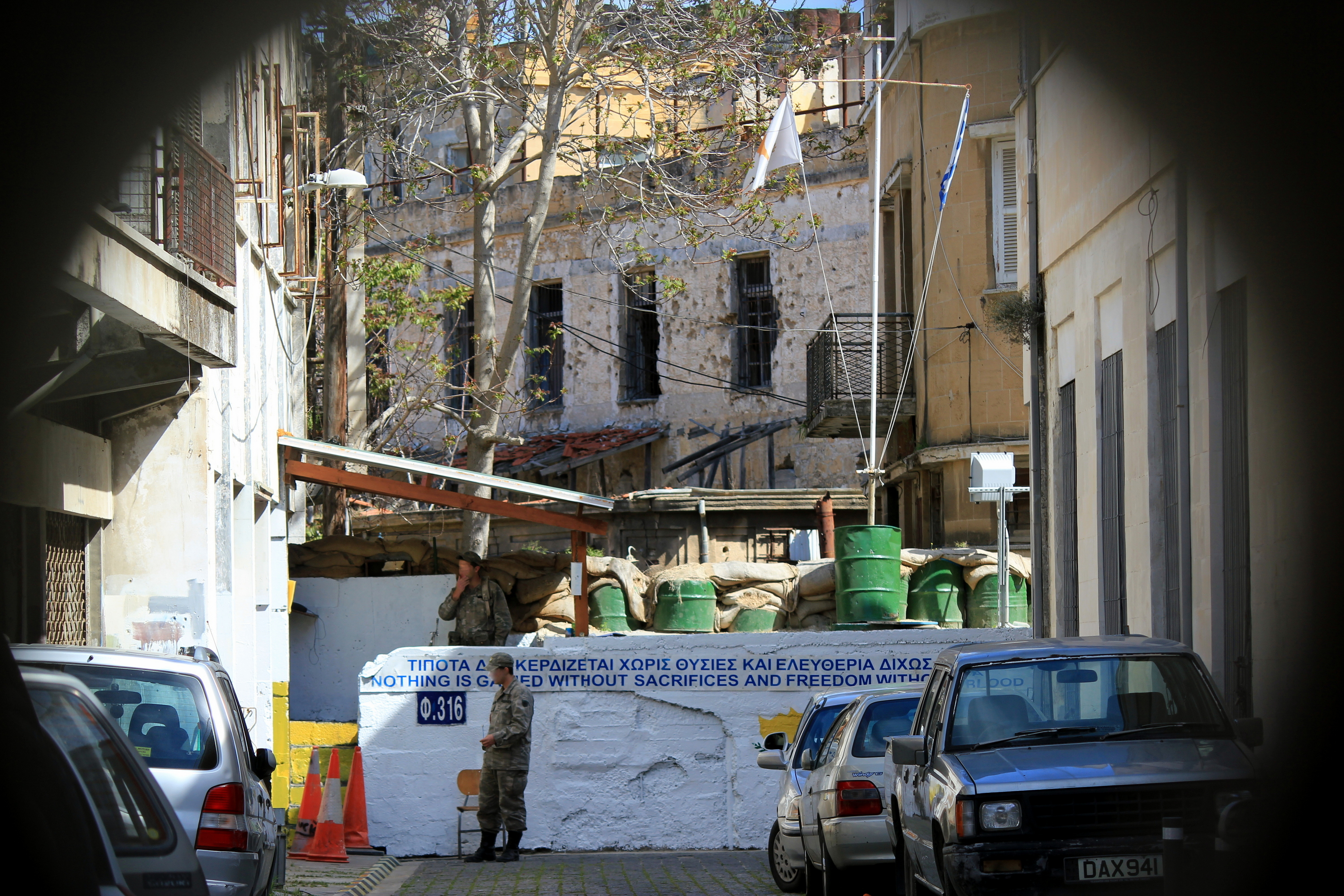
- Border barricade in the buffer zone
- Date: 14 December 2005
- Meeting no.: 5,324
- Code: S/RES/1642 (Document)
- Subject: The situation in Cyprus
- Voting summary: 15 voted for; None voted against; None abstained
- Result: Adopted

Security Council composition
- Permanent members: China; France; Russia; United Kingdom; United States
- Non-permanent members: Algeria; Argentina; Benin; Brazil; Denmark; Greece; Japan; Philippines; Romania; Tanzania

United Nations Security Council Resolution 1642, adopted unanimously on 14 December 2005, after reaffirming all resolutions on the situation in Cyprus, particularly Resolution 1251 (1999), the council extended the mandate of the United Nations Peacekeeping Force in Cyprus (UNFICYP) for an additional period until 15 June 2006.

== Observations ==
The security council called on both Cyprus and Northern Cyprus to urgently address the humanitarian issue of missing persons. It welcomed the Secretary-General Kofi Annan's assessment that violence on the island was unlikely, and that demining efforts were taking place. Referring to military exercises, both sides were urged to refrain from actions that would increase tension, and the Council regretted that a political solution had been delayed. There was also concern over differences in construction activity related to an additional crossing point at Ledra Street.

The resolution went on to welcome the review of UNFICYP operations undertaken by the secretary-general, the fact that over nine million crossings of Greek and Turkish Cypriots had taken place, and the contributions of Greece and Cyprus to the peacekeeping operation.

== Acts ==
Extending UNFICYP's mandate, the resolution requested the secretary-general to report to the council on the implementation of the current resolution, further endorsing UNFICYP's efforts to implement the sexual exploitation policy. It urged the Turkish Cypriot side to restore the military status quo at Strovilia prior to 30 June 2000.

== See also ==
- Annan Plan for Cyprus
- Annan Plan referendum
- Cyprus problem
- List of United Nations Security Council Resolutions 1601 to 1700 (2005–2006)
- United Nations Buffer Zone in Cyprus
- Turkish invasion of Cyprus
