= United Nations Security Council Resolution 1689 =

UN Security Council Resolution 1689
- Liberia
- Date: 20 June 2006
- Meeting no.: 5,468
- Code: S/RES/1689 (Document)
- Subject: The situation in Liberia
- Voting summary: 15 voted for; None voted against; None abstained
- Result: Adopted

Security Council composition
- Permanent members: China; France; Russia; United Kingdom; United States
- Non-permanent members: Argentina; Rep. of the Congo; Denmark; Ghana; Greece; Japan; Peru; Qatar; Slovakia; Tanzania

United Nations Security Council Resolution 1689, adopted unanimously on June 20, 2006, after recalling all previous resolutions on the situation in Liberia and West Africa, the Council decided to continue sanctions against the import of diamonds from the country for six months, though similar restrictions relating to timber imports were lifted.

== Resolution ==
=== Observations ===
The Council began by welcoming the role of President Ellen Johnson Sirleaf in her efforts to rebuild Liberia. It commended Sirleaf, Nigerian President Olusegun Obasanjo and others for their role in transferring former Liberian President Charles Taylor to the Special Court for Sierra Leone.

The resolution also welcomed the adoption of a "Governance and Economic Management Assistance Programme" by the Liberian government in attempt to lift restrictions imposed by Resolution 1521 (2003), co-operation with the Kimberley Process Certification Scheme and attempts at transparent management of the forestry sector. At the same time, progress in the timber sector was limited due to a lack of appropriate legislation.

Council members stressed the importance of the United Nations Mission in Liberia (UNMIL) in improving security and helping the government establish its authority throughout the country, particularly in the diamond and timber producing regions and border areas. The situation continued to constitute a threat to peace and security in the region.

=== Acts ===
Acting under Chapter VII of the United Nations Charter, the Council decided not to renew restrictions against the import of timber. The lifting of the measure would be reviewed within 90 days and reinstated if it became apparent that forestry legislation had not been passed. In this context, the Council urged the legislation to be adopted quickly.

Restrictions against the import of rough diamonds were extended for a period of six months, with a review after four months to allow the Liberian government time to establish a certificate of origin regime, which it was instructed to present to the sanctions committee.

Finally, the Secretary-General Kofi Annan was requested to extend the mandate of an expert panel monitoring the sanctions for a further six months that was re-established in Resolution 1647 (2005). The panel was required to report by December 15, 2006 with its observations and recommendations concerning the implementation of the sanctions.

== See also ==
- List of United Nations Security Council Resolutions 1601 to 1700 (2005–2006)
- Second Liberian Civil War
