= United Nations Security Council Resolution 1680 =

UN Security Council Resolution 1680
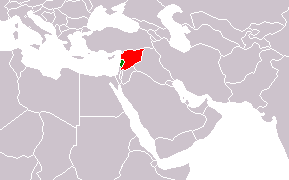
- Lebanon (green) and Syria (red)
- Date: 17 May 2006
- Meeting no.: 5,440
- Code: S/RES/1680 (Document)
- Subject: The situation in the Middle East
- Voting summary: 13 voted for; None voted against; 2 abstained
- Result: Adopted

Security Council composition
- Permanent members: China; France; Russia; United Kingdom; United States
- Non-permanent members: Argentina; Rep. of the Congo; Denmark; Ghana; Greece; Japan; Peru; Qatar; Slovakia; Tanzania

United Nations Security Council Resolution 1680, adopted on May 17, 2006, after recalling previous resolutions on Lebanon, including 425 (1978), 426 (1978), 520 (1982), 1559 (2004) and 1655 (2005), the Council strongly encouraged Syria to respond positively to Lebanon's request to delineate borders and establish diplomatic relations, with the purpose of asserting Lebanon's sovereignty, territorial integrity and political independence.

The resolution, co-sponsored by France, the United Kingdom and the United States, was adopted by a vote of 13 in favour, none against, and two abstentions from China and Russia; both countries believed the resolution constituted interference in the diplomatic relations between Lebanon and Syria.

== Background ==
On April 18, 2006, the Secretary-General Kofi Annan transmitted his third semi-annual report on the implementation of Resolution 1559, adopted on September 2, 2004. Resolution 1559 called for "the withdrawal of all remaining foreign forces from Lebanon; the disbanding and disarmament of all Lebanese and non-Lebanese militias; the extension of the control of the Lebanese Government over all Lebanese territory; and strict respect of the sovereignty, territorial integrity, unity, and political independence of Lebanon under the sole and exclusive authority of the Lebanese Government throughout Lebanon."

The Secretary-General's report stated that many of the provisions listed in Resolution 1559, the 1989 Taif Agreement, and the lack of political stability, that Lebanon was still in a fragile and vulnerable state. This led to the adoption of the supporting resolution, 1680.

== Resolution ==
=== Observations ===
The Security Council began by reiterating its support for the territorial integrity, sovereignty and political independence of Lebanon within its internationally recognised borders. Furthermore, it noted that positive progress made through national dialogue, though regretted that some provisions of Resolution 1559 had not yet been fully implemented, namely the disbanding and disarming of Lebanese and non-Lebanese militias, the extension of the control of the Lebanese government over all its territory, the strict respect of the sovereignty, territorial integrity, unity and political independence of Lebanon, and free and fair presidential elections conducted according to the Lebanese constitutional rules, without foreign interference.

The text of the resolution expressed concern that the Secretary-General reported a movement of arms into Lebanese territory for militias over the past six months. It expressed full support for the national dialogue and commended all Lebanese parties for their conduct.

=== Acts ===
The Security Council called for the full implementation of Resolution 1559, calling on all states and parties to co-operate full with the Lebanese government, Security Council and Secretary-General. It encouraged the Syrian government to respond positively to the request made Lebanon to delineate their common border (particularly in disputed areas), while noting that such measures would constitute a step towards improving relations between the two countries as well as asserting Lebanon's independence, which in turn would contribute positively to the stability in the region.

The resolution praised Lebanon for undertaking measures against the movements of arms and militia into Lebanese territory and called on Syria to adopt similar measures. Finally, it welcomed the decision of the Lebanese national dialogue to disarm Palestinian militias outside refugee camps within six months.

== See also ==
- 2006 Lebanon War
- Assassination of Rafic Hariri
- Ceasefire attempts during the 2006 Lebanon War
- Lebanon–Syria relations
- List of United Nations Security Council Resolutions 1601 to 1700 (2005–2006)
- Special Tribunal for Lebanon
- United Nations International Independent Investigation Commission
