= United Nations Security Council Resolution 1604 =

UN Security Council Resolution 1604
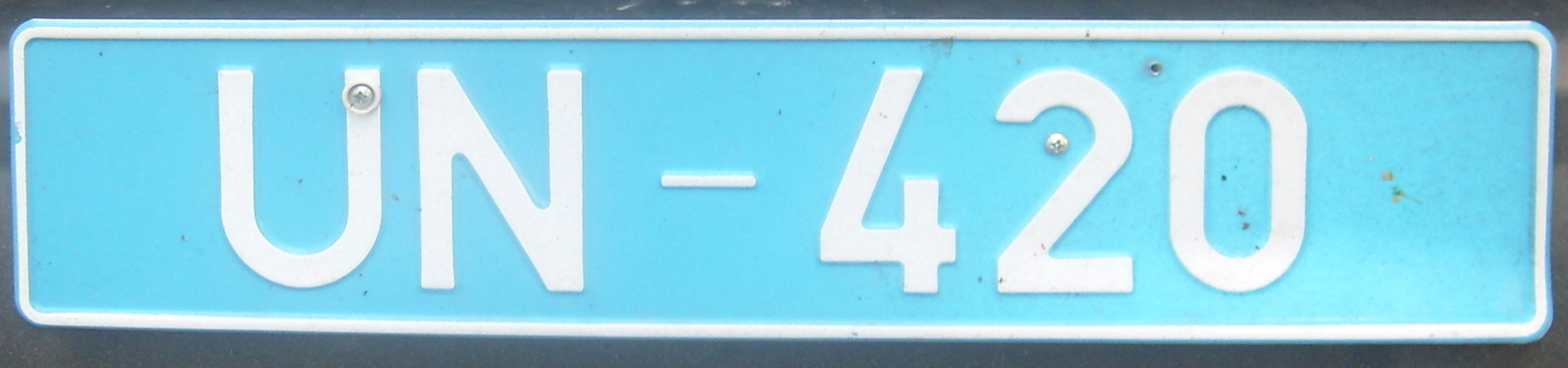
- UNFICYP numberplate
- Date: 15 June 2005
- Meeting no.: 5,202
- Code: S/RES/1604 (Document)
- Subject: The situation in Cyprus
- Voting summary: 15 voted for; None voted against; None abstained
- Result: Adopted

Security Council composition
- Permanent members: China; France; Russia; United Kingdom; United States
- Non-permanent members: Algeria; Argentina; Benin; Brazil; Denmark; Greece; Japan; Philippines; Romania; Tanzania

United Nations Security Council resolution 1604, adopted unanimously on 15 June 2005, after reaffirming all resolutions on the situation in Cyprus, particularly Resolution 1251 (1999), the Council extended the mandate of the United Nations Peacekeeping Force in Cyprus (UNFICYP) for an additional period until 15 December 2005.

== Observations ==
The security council called on both Cyprus and Northern Cyprus to urgently address the humanitarian issue of missing persons. It welcomed the Secretary-General Kofi Annan's review of UNFICYP as requested in Resolution 1568 (2004) and his assessment that violence on the island was unlikely, as well as his intention to keep the operation under review. The council welcomed the lifting of restrictions on the freedom of movement of UNFICYP by the Turkish side and the good co-operation from both sides, though there was concern at the level of crime across the ceasefire line.

The resolution also welcomed the continued funding of the United Nations operations by the governments of Cyprus and Greece.

== Acts ==
Extending UNFICYP's mandate, the resolution requested the secretary-general to report to the council on the implementation of the current resolution, further endorsing UNFICYP's efforts to implement the sexual exploitation policy. It urged the Turkish Cypriot side to restore the military status quo at Strovilia prior to 30 June 2000.

== See also ==
- Annan Plan for Cyprus
- Annan Plan referendum
- Cyprus problem
- List of United Nations Security Council Resolutions 1601 to 1700 (2005–2006)
- United Nations Buffer Zone in Cyprus
- Turkish invasion of Cyprus
