= United Nations Security Council Resolution 1669 =

UN Security Council Resolution 1669
- Burundi
- Date: 10 April 2006
- Meeting no.: 5,408
- Code: S/RES/1669 (Document)
- Subject: The situation concerning the Democratic Republic of the Congo
- Voting summary: 15 voted for; None voted against; None abstained
- Result: Adopted

Security Council composition
- Permanent members: China; France; Russia; United Kingdom; United States
- Non-permanent members: Argentina; Rep. of the Congo; Denmark; Ghana; Greece; Japan; Peru; Qatar; Slovakia; Tanzania

United Nations Security Council Resolution 1669, adopted unanimously on April 10, 2006, after recalling previous resolutions concerning the situation in Burundi and the Democratic Republic of the Congo, particularly Resolution 1650 (2005), the Council authorised the redeployment of personnel from the United Nations Operation in Burundi (ONUB) to the United Nations Mission in the Democratic Republic of the Congo (MONUC) until July 1, 2006.

== Resolution ==
=== Observations ===
The preamble of the resolution reaffirmed the sovereignty, territorial integrity and independence of Burundi and the principles of good-neighbourliness, non-interference and co-operation in the African Great Lakes region. Furthermore, it welcomed the conclusion of the transitional period in Burundi and the installation of a democratic and representative government and institutions. Council members, however, recognised that "factors of instability" remained in the region that could constitute a threat to international peace and security.

=== Acts ===
Acting under Chapter VII of the United Nations Charter, the Council redeployed 50 military observers, a military battalion and a military hospital from ONUB to MONUC, with the intention of further renewals dependent on whether the Council authorised extensions of the peacekeeping operations' respective mandates.

== See also ==
- Burundi Civil War
- Kivu conflict
- Ituri conflict
- List of United Nations Security Council Resolutions 1601 to 1700 (2005–2006)
- Second Congo War
