= United Nations Security Council Resolution 1694 =

UN Security Council Resolution 1694
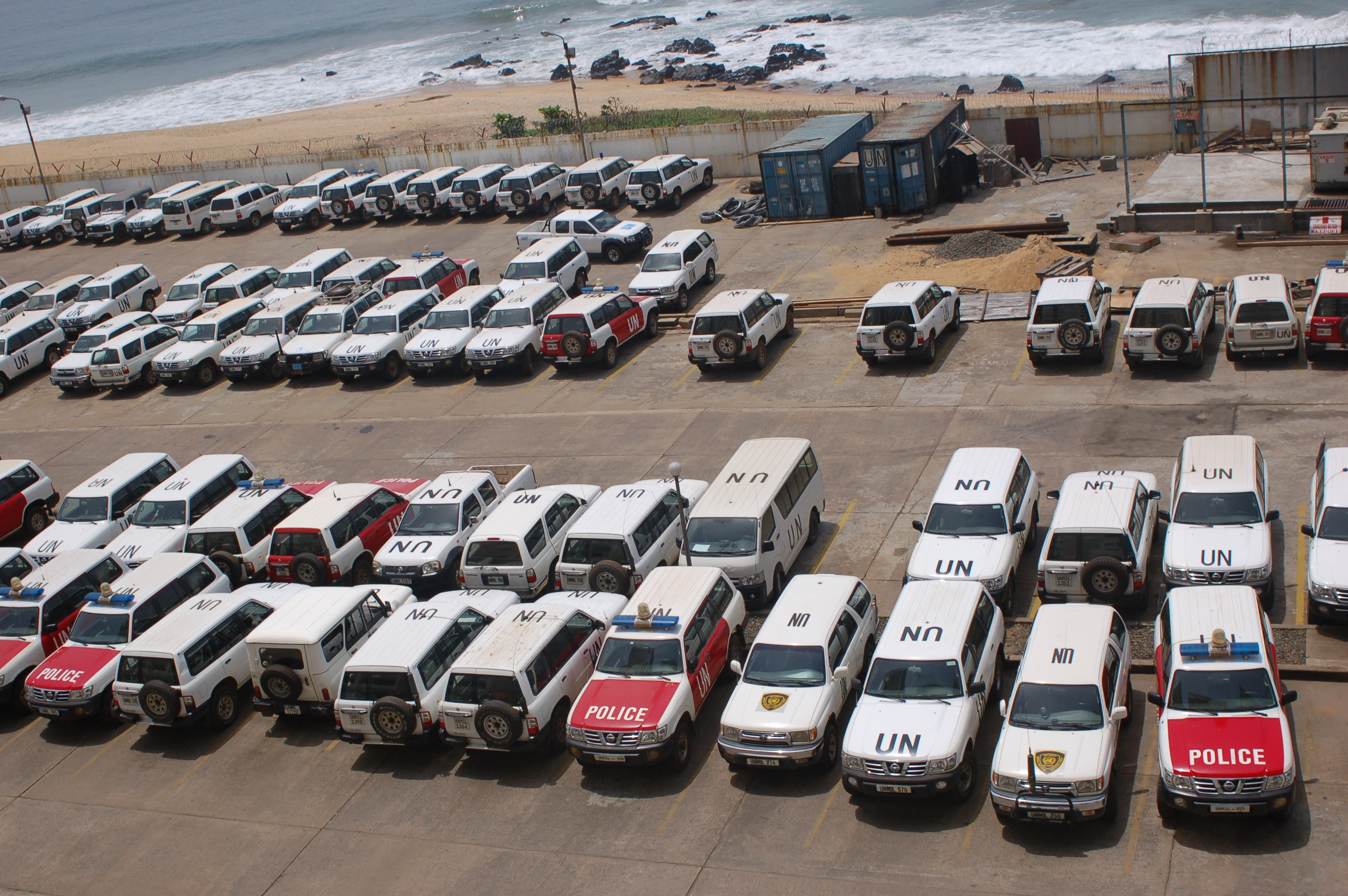
- UNMIL vehicles in Liberia
- Date: 13 July 2006
- Meeting no.: 5,487
- Code: S/RES/1694 (Document)
- Subject: The situation in Liberia
- Voting summary: 15 voted for; None voted against; None abstained
- Result: Adopted

Security Council composition
- Permanent members: China; France; Russia; United Kingdom; United States
- Non-permanent members: Argentina; Rep. of the Congo; Denmark; Ghana; Greece; Japan; Peru; Qatar; Slovakia; Tanzania

United Nations Security Council Resolution 1694, adopted unanimously on July 13, 2006, after recalling all previous resolutions on the situation in Liberia and West Africa, including Resolution 1667 (2006), the Council increased the size of the police component of the United Nations Mission in Liberia (UNMIL) and reduced its military component.

The Chapter VII resolution increased the police component by 125 personnel and reduced the size of the military component by the same number. The measure was taken after a report from the Secretary-General Kofi Annan recommended changes to UNMIL's configuration.

== See also ==
- List of United Nations Security Council Resolutions 1601 to 1700 (2005–2006)
- Second Liberian Civil War
