= United Nations Security Council Resolution 1631 =

UN Security Council Resolution 1631
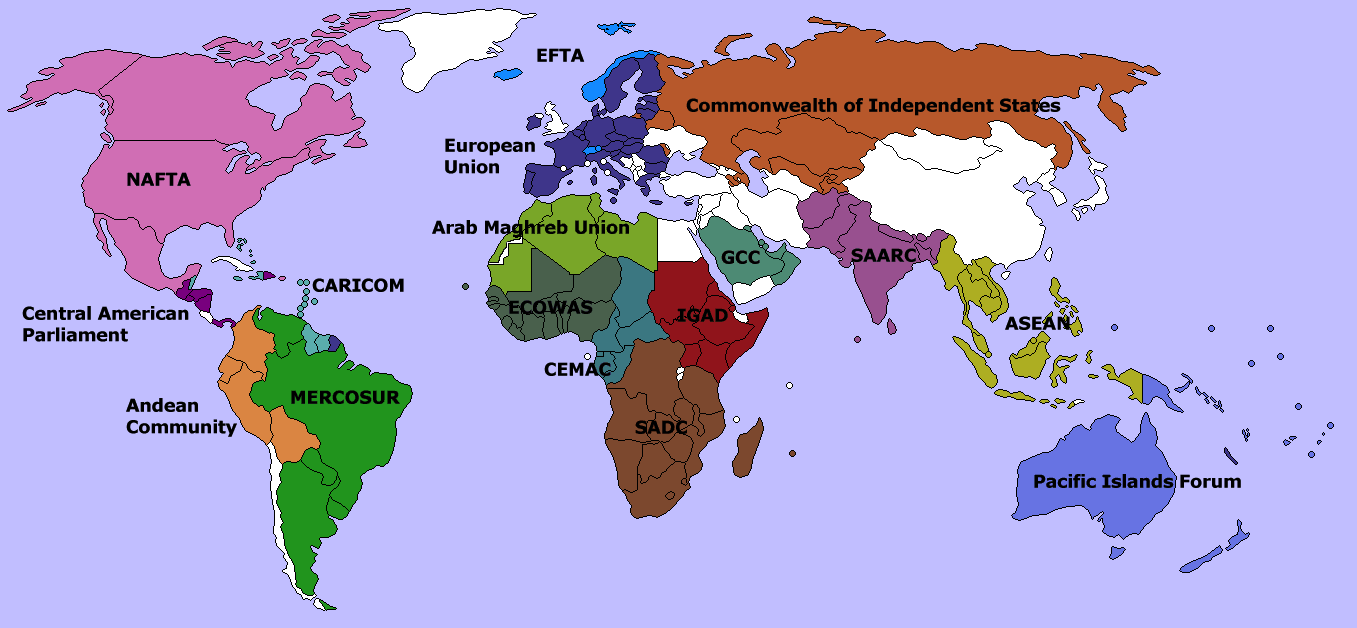
- International organisations
- Date: 17 October 2005
- Meeting no.: 5,282
- Code: S/RES/1631 (Document)
- Subject: Cooperation between the United Nations and regional organisations in maintaining international peace and security
- Voting summary: 15 voted for; None voted against; None abstained
- Result: Adopted

Security Council composition
- Permanent members: China; France; Russia; United Kingdom; United States
- Non-permanent members: Algeria; Argentina; Benin; Brazil; Denmark; Greece; Japan; Philippines; Romania; Tanzania

United Nations Security Council resolution 1631, adopted unanimously on 17 October 2005, after recalling Chapter VIII of the United Nations Charter, the council addressed co-operation between the United Nations and regional organisations in the maintenance of international peace and security.

The resolution was the first time the council had outlined such co-operation.

== Observations ==
In the preamble of the resolution, the council recalled initiatives since January 1993 to improve co-ordination between the United Nations and regional organisations. It emphasised that the contribution of regional organisations could complement the work of the United Nations in maintaining international peace and security. The capacity of regional organisations was to be strengthened and the council acknowledged the resolve of the 2005 World Summit to increase the role of regional organisations. A decision to establish at Peacebuilding Commission was also welcomed.

== Acts ==
Further expressing its determination to increase co-operation between the United Nations and regional organisations, the Council urged all states to increase the capacity of the organisations in conflict prevention and crisis management, particularly in Africa. It was also important for regional organisations to deploy peacekeeping units quickly, tackle illegal arms trafficking, encourage regional co-operation and hold high-level meetings with the United Nations.

The Secretary-General Kofi Annan was requested to submit a report on the opportunities and challenges of co-operation between regional organisations and the United Nations, and to include co-operation with regional organisations in his regular reports to the council on peacekeeping and peacebuilding missions.

== See also ==
- List of United Nations Security Council Resolutions 1601 to 1700 (2005–2006)
