= United Nations Security Council Resolution 1655 =

UN Security Council Resolution 1655
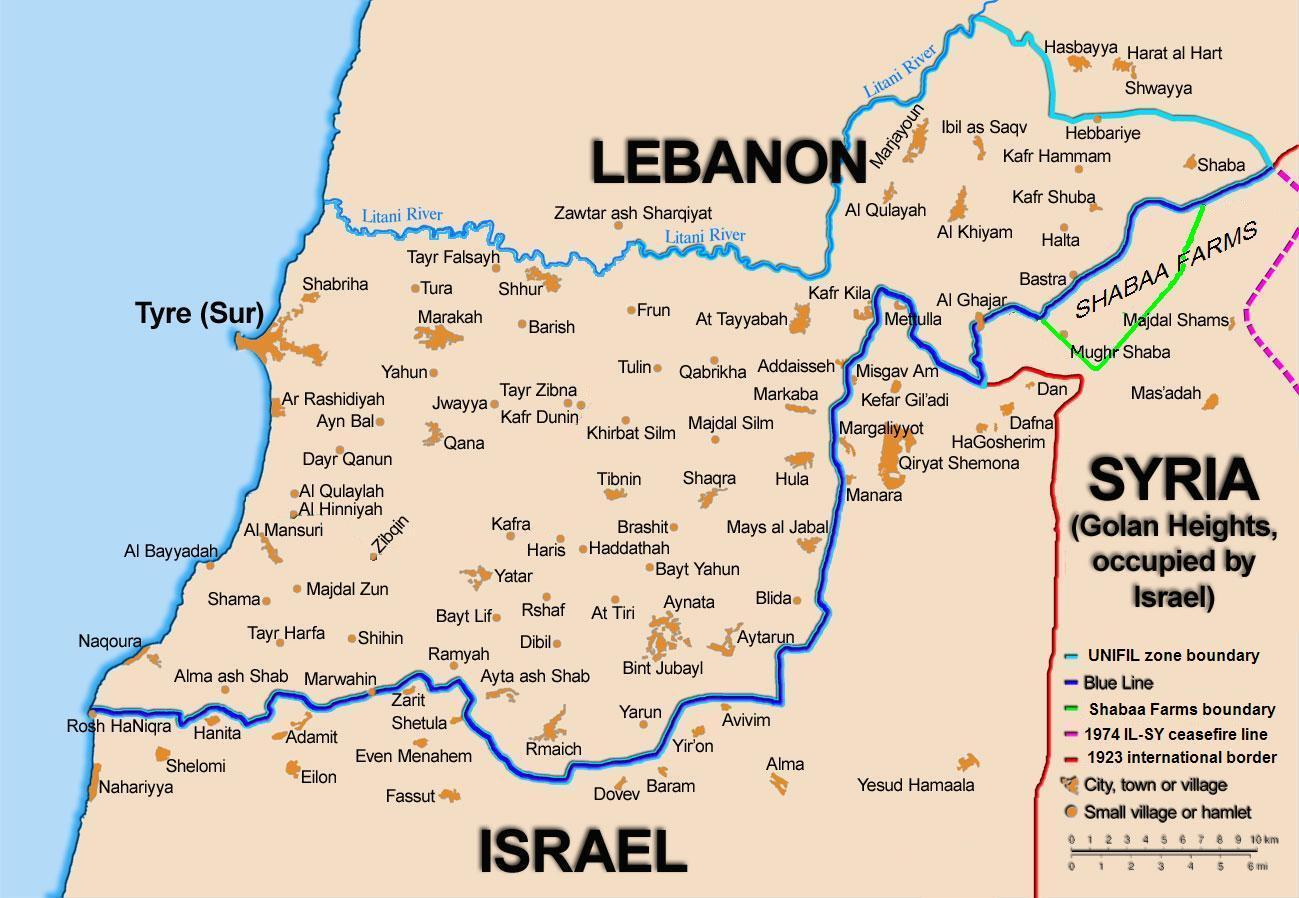
- Blue Line along the Israeli-Lebanese border
- Date: 31 January 2006
- Meeting no.: 5,362
- Code: S/RES/1655 (Document)
- Subject: The situation in the Middle East
- Voting summary: 15 voted for; None voted against; None abstained
- Result: Adopted

Security Council composition
- Permanent members: China; France; Russia; United Kingdom; United States
- Non-permanent members: Argentina; Rep. of the Congo; Denmark; Ghana; Greece; Japan; Peru; Qatar; Slovakia; Tanzania

United Nations Security Council Resolution 1655, adopted unanimously on January 31, 2006, after recalling previous resolutions on Israel and Lebanon, including resolutions 425 (1978), 426 (1978) and 1614 (2005), the Council extended the mandate of the United Nations Interim Force in Lebanon (UNIFIL) for a further six months until July 31, 2006.

Lebanon had initially requested a twelve-month extension until January 31, 2007, but Council members later agreed a six-month extension.

== Resolution ==
=== Observations ===
The Security Council recalled Secretary-General Kofi Annan's conclusion that Israel had withdrawn its forces from Lebanon as of June 16, 2000, under Resolution 425. It emphasised the temporary nature of the UNIFIL operation and urged respect for the Blue Line which was valid for confirming Israel's withdrawal. There was concern at tensions along the Blue Line, including hostilities initiated by Hezbollah and the firing of rockets into Israel from Lebanon, as well as violations of Lebanese airspace by Israel.

=== Acts ===
The Lebanese government was called upon to do more to reassert its authority in southern Lebanon through the deployment of Lebanese forces and co-operation with UNIFIL and the Secretary-General. The parties were urged to ensure UNIFIL's full freedom of movement and to ensure its safety. Both Israel and Lebanon were called upon to fulfill commitments to respect the withdrawal line identified by the United Nations and all air, sea and land violations of the line were condemned, making reference to acts carried out from the Lebanese side.

The resolution supported efforts by UNIFIL to monitor violations of the withdrawal line and efforts in demining, encouraging the need for additional maps to be provided of the location of land mines. The Secretary-General was requested to continue consultations with the Lebanese government and troop-contributing countries concerning the implementation of the current resolution. It further directed him to report on the activities of UNIFIL and on tasks conducted by the United Nations Truce Supervision Organization (UNTSO). The mandate and structure of UNIFIL was to be kept under constant review.

Finally, the resolution concluded by stressing the importance of a just and lasting peace in the Middle East based on relevant Security Council resolutions including 242 (1967) and 338 (1973).

== See also ==
- Blue Line
- List of United Nations Security Council Resolutions 1601 to 1700 (2005–2006)
- 2000–2006 Shebaa Farms conflict
