= List of United Nations Security Council Resolutions 1601 to 1700 =

This is a list of United Nations Security Council Resolutions 1601 to 1700 adopted between 31 May 2005 and 10 August 2006.

Resolution	Date	Vote	Concerns
1601	31 May 2005	15–0–0	Extends mandate of the United Nations Stabilisation Mission in Haiti
1602	31 May 2005	15–0–0	Extends mandate of the United Nations Operation in Burundi
1603	3 June 2005	15–0–0	Extends mandate of the United Nations Operation in Côte d'Ivoire
1604	15 June 2005	15–0–0	Extends mandate of the United Nations Peacekeeping Force in Cyprus
1605	17 June 2005	15–0–0	Extends mandate of the United Nations Disengagement Observer Force
1606	20 June 2005	15–0–0	Requests Secretary-General to begin negotiations on Truth Commission in Burundi
1607	21 June 2005	15–0–0	Renews diamond embargo against Liberia
1608	22 June 2005	15–0–0	Extends mandate of the United Nations Stabilisation Mission in Haiti
1609	24 June 2005	15–0–0	Extends mandate of the United Nations Operation in Côte d'Ivoire and supporting French forces
1610	30 June 2005	15–0–0	Extends mandate of the United Nations Mission in Sierra Leone
1611	7 July 2005	15–0–0	Condemns bombings in London, United Kingdom
1612	26 July 2005	15–0–0	Establishes monitoring and reporting mechanism on the use of child soldiers
1613	26 July 2005	15–0–0	Nominations for judges at the International Criminal Tribunal for the former Yugoslavia
1614	29 July 2005	15–0–0	Extends mandate of the United Nations Interim Force in Lebanon
1615	29 July 2005	15–0–0	Extends mandate of the United Nations Observer Mission in Georgia
1616	29 July 2005	15–0–0	Renews arms embargo against the Democratic Republic of the Congo
1617	29 July 2005	15–0–0	Renews sanctions against the Taliban, Al-Qaeda, Osama bin Laden and associates
1618	4 August 2005	15–0–0	Condemns terrorist attacks in Iraq
1619	11 August 2005	15–0–0	Extends mandate of the United Nations Assistance Mission in Iraq
1620	31 August 2005	15–0–0	Establishes the United Nations Integrated Office in Sierra Leone
1621	6 September 2005	15–0–0	Increases strength of the United Nations Mission in the Democratic Republic of Congo
1622	13 September 2005	15–0–0	Extends mandate of the United Nations Mission in Ethiopia and Eritrea
1623	13 September 2005	15–0–0	Extends authorisation of the International Security Assistance Force in Afghanistan
1624	14 September 2005	15–0–0	Calls on states to enhance terrorist screening and passenger security procedures
1625	14 September 2005	15–0–0	Reaffirms need to adopt conflict prevention strategy
1626	19 September 2005	15–0–0	Extends mandate of the United Nations Mission in Liberia
1627	23 September 2005	15–0–0	Extends mandate of the United Nations Mission in Sudan
1628	30 September 2005	15–0–0	Extends mandate of the United Nations Mission in the Democratic Republic of Congo
1629	30 September 2005	15–0–0	Assignment of case at the International Criminal Tribunal for the former Yugoslavia
1630	14 October 2005	15–0–0	Re-establishes panel monitoring arms embargo against Somalia
1631	17 October 2005	15–0–0	Co-operation between the United Nations and regional organisations in maintaining international peace and security
1632	18 October 2005	15–0–0	Extends mandate of expert group in Côte d'Ivoire
1633	21 October 2005	15–0–0	Demands implementation of peace agreements in Côte d’Ivoire
1634	28 October 2005	15–0–0	Extends mandate of the United Nations Mission for the Referendum in Western Sahara
1635	28 October 2005	15–0–0	Extends mandate of the United Nations Mission in the Democratic Republic of Congo
1636	31 October 2005	15–0–0	Demands Syria co-operate with the United Nations Independent Investigation Commission and end interference in Lebanon
1637	8 November 2005	15–0–0	Extends mandate of the Multi-National Force – Iraq
1638	11 November 2005	15–0–0	Arrest, detention and transfer to the Special Court for Sierra Leone of Charles Taylor
1639	21 November 2005	15–0–0	Authorises continuation of EUFOR Althea in Bosnia and Herzegovina
1640	23 November 2005	15–0–0	Demands Eritrea end restrictions on the United Nations Mission in Ethiopia and Eritrea
1641	30 November 2005	15–0–0	Extends mandate of the United Nations Operation in Burundi
1642	14 December 2005	15–0–0	Extends mandate of the United Nations Peacekeeping Force in Cyprus
1643	15 December 2005	15–0–0	Renews arms embargo, travel and financial restrictions on Côte d'Ivoire
1644	15 December 2005	15–0–0	Extends mandate of the United Nations International Independent Investigation Commission in Lebanon
1645	20 December 2005	15–0–0	Establishes the United Nations Peacebuilding Commission
1646	20 December 2005	13–0–2 (abstentions: Argentina, Brazil)	Membership of the Peacebuilding Commission
1647	20 December 2005	15–0–0	Renews arms, travel, diamonds and timber restrictions against Liberia
1648	21 December 2005	15–0–0	Extends mandate of the United Nations Disengagement Observer Force
1649	21 December 2005	15–0–0	Renews arms embargo, financial and travel sanctions against the Democratic Republic of the Congo
1650	21 December 2005	15–0–0	Extends mandate of the United Nations Operation in Burundi
1651	21 December 2005	15–0–0	Extends mandate of panel monitoring situation in Darfur, western Sudan
1652	24 January 2006	15–0–0	Extends mandate of the United Nations Operation in Côte d'Ivoire and supporting French forces
1653	27 January 2006	15–0–0	Stresses disarmament and demobilisation in African Great Lakes region
1654	31 January 2006	15–0–0	Re-establishes panel monitoring arms embargo against the Democratic Republic of the Congo
1655	31 January 2006	15–0–0	Extends mandate of the United Nations Interim Force in Lebanon
1656	31 January 2006	15–0–0	Extends mandate of the United Nations Observer Mission in Georgia
1657	6 February 2006	15–0–0	Redeploys one infantry company from the United Nations Mission in Liberia to the United Nations Operation in Côte d’Ivoire
1658	14 February 2006	15–0–0	Extends mandate of the United Nations Stabilisation Mission in Haiti
1659	15 February 2006	15–0–0	Endorses Afghanistan Compact
1660	28 February 2006	15–0–0	Amends statute of the International Criminal Tribunal for the former Yugoslavia
1661	14 March 2006	15–0–0	Extends mandate of the United Nations Mission in Ethiopia and Eritrea
1662	23 March 2006	15–0–0	Extends mandate of the United Nations Assistance Mission in Afghanistan
1663	24 March 2006	15–0–0	Extends mandate of the United Nations Mission in Sudan
1664	29 March 2006	15–0–0	Requests Secretary-General to consult with Lebanese government over tribunal for assassination of Rafic Hariri
1665	29 March 2006	15–0–0	Extends mandate of panel monitoring situation in Darfur, western Sudan
1666	31 March 2006	15–0–0	Extends mandate of the United Nations Observer Mission in Georgia
1667	31 March 2006	15–0–0	Extends mandate of the United Nations Mission in Liberia
1668	10 April 2006	15–0–0	Case at the International Criminal Tribunal for the former Yugoslavia
1669	10 April 2006	15–0–0	Redeploys personnel from the United Nations Operation in Burundi to the United Nations Mission in the Democratic Republic of Congo
1670	13 April 2006	15–0–0	Extends mandate of the United Nations Mission in Ethiopia and Eritrea
1671	25 April 2006	15–0–0	Authorises deployment of EUFOR RD Congo to the Democratic Republic of the Congo
1672	25 April 2006	12–0–3 (abstentions: China, Qatar, Russia)	Imposes sanctions on four Sudanese individuals
1673	27 April 2006	15–0–0	Extends mandate of committee monitoring implementation of Resolution 1540 on non-proliferation
1674	28 April 2006	15–0–0	Importance of preventing conflict through development and democracy
1675	28 April 2006	15–0–0	Extends mandate of the United Nations Mission for the Referendum in Western Sahara
1676	10 May 2006	15–0–0	Re-establishes panel monitoring arms embargo against Somalia
1677	12 May 2006	15–0–0	Extends mandate of the United Nations Office in East Timor
1678	15 May 2006	15–0–0	Extends mandate of the United Nations Mission in Ethiopia and Eritrea
1679	16 May 2006	15–0–0	Decision of African Union to transform peacekeeping operation in Darfur, Sudan
1680	17 May 2006	13–0–2 (abstentions: China, Russia)	Encourages Syria to respond to Lebanese request to delineate border
1681	31 May 2006	15–0–0	Extends mandate of the United Nations Mission in Ethiopia and Eritrea
1682	2 June 2006	15–0–0	Increases strength of the United Nations Operation in Côte d'Ivoire
1683	13 June 2006	15–0–0	Adjusts arms embargo against Liberia
1684	13 June 2006	15–0–0	Nominations for judges at the International Criminal Tribunal for Rwanda
1685	13 June 2006	15–0–0	Extends mandate of the United Nations Disengagement Observer Force
1686	15 June 2006	15–0–0	Extends mandate of the United Nations International Independent Investigation Commission in Lebanon
1687	15 June 2006	15–0–0	Extends mandate of the United Nations Peacekeeping Force in Cyprus
1688	16 June 2006	15–0–0	Approves transfer of former Liberian President Charles Taylor to The Hague, Netherlands
1689	20 June 2006	15–0–0	Renews restrictions against import of rough diamonds from Liberia; lifts restrictions on timber
1690	20 June 2006	15–0–0	Extends mandate of the United Nations Office in East Timor
1691	22 June 2006	Adopted without vote	Admission of Montenegro to the United Nations
1692	30 June 2006	15–0–0	Extends mandate of the United Nations Operation in Burundi
1693	30 June 2006	15–0–0	Extends increase in size of the United Nations Mission in the Democratic Republic of Congo
1694	13 July 2006	15–0–0	Increases police component of the United Nations Mission in Liberia
1695	15 July 2006	15–0–0	Condemns missile tests by North Korea
1696	31 July 2006	14–1–0 (against: Qatar)	Demands Iran end uranium enrichment activities
1697	31 July 2006	15–0–0	Extends mandate of the United Nations Interim Force in Lebanon
1698	31 July 2006	15–0–0	Extends mandate of expert group in the Democratic Republic of the Congo
1699	8 August 2006	15–0–0	Co-operation between the United Nations and Interpol relating to international sanctions
1700	10 August 2006	15–0–0	Extends mandate of the United Nations Assistance Mission in Iraq

== See also ==
- Lists of United Nations Security Council resolutions
- List of United Nations Security Council Resolutions 1501 to 1600
- List of United Nations Security Council Resolutions 1701 to 1800
