= United Nations Security Council Resolution 1641 =

UN Security Council Resolution 1641
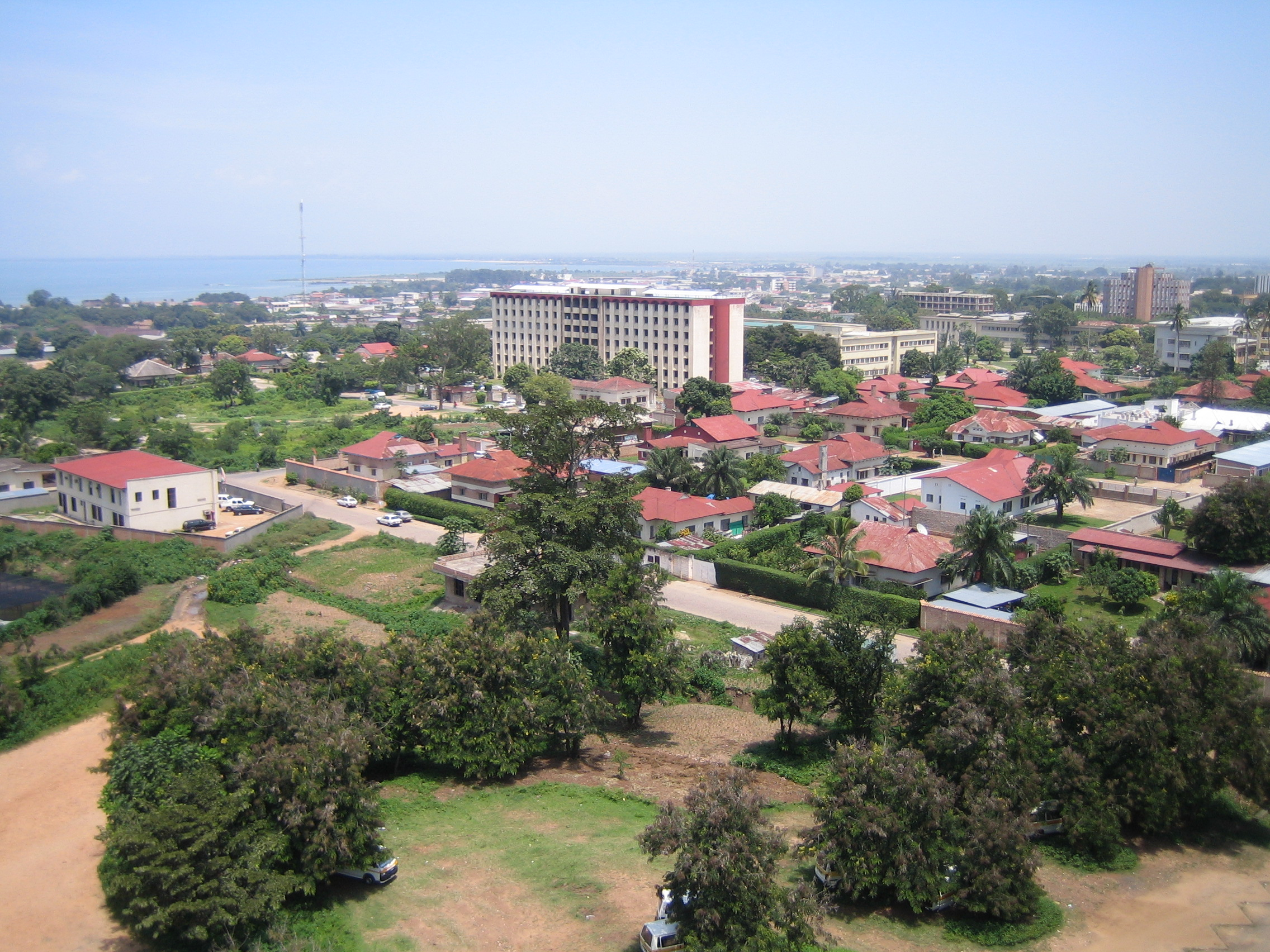
- Burundian capital Bujumbura
- Date: 30 November 2005
- Meeting no.: 5,311
- Code: S/RES/1641 (Document)
- Subject: The situation in Burundi
- Voting summary: 15 voted for; None voted against; None abstained
- Result: Adopted

Security Council composition
- Permanent members: China; France; Russia; United Kingdom; United States
- Non-permanent members: Algeria; Argentina; Benin; Brazil; Denmark; Greece; Japan; Philippines; Romania; Tanzania

United Nations Security Council resolution 1641, adopted unanimously on 30 November 2005, after recalling Resolution 1545 (2004) regarding the situation in Burundi, the Council extended the mandate of the United Nations Operation in Burundi until 15 January 2006.

While affirming the sovereignty and territorial integrity of Burundi, the text also noted continuing factors of instability in the country, which constituted a threat to peace and security in the region.

== See also ==
- Burundi Civil War
- List of United Nations Security Council Resolutions 1601 to 1700 (2005–2006)
