= United Nations Security Council Resolution 1626 =

UN Security Council Resolution 1626
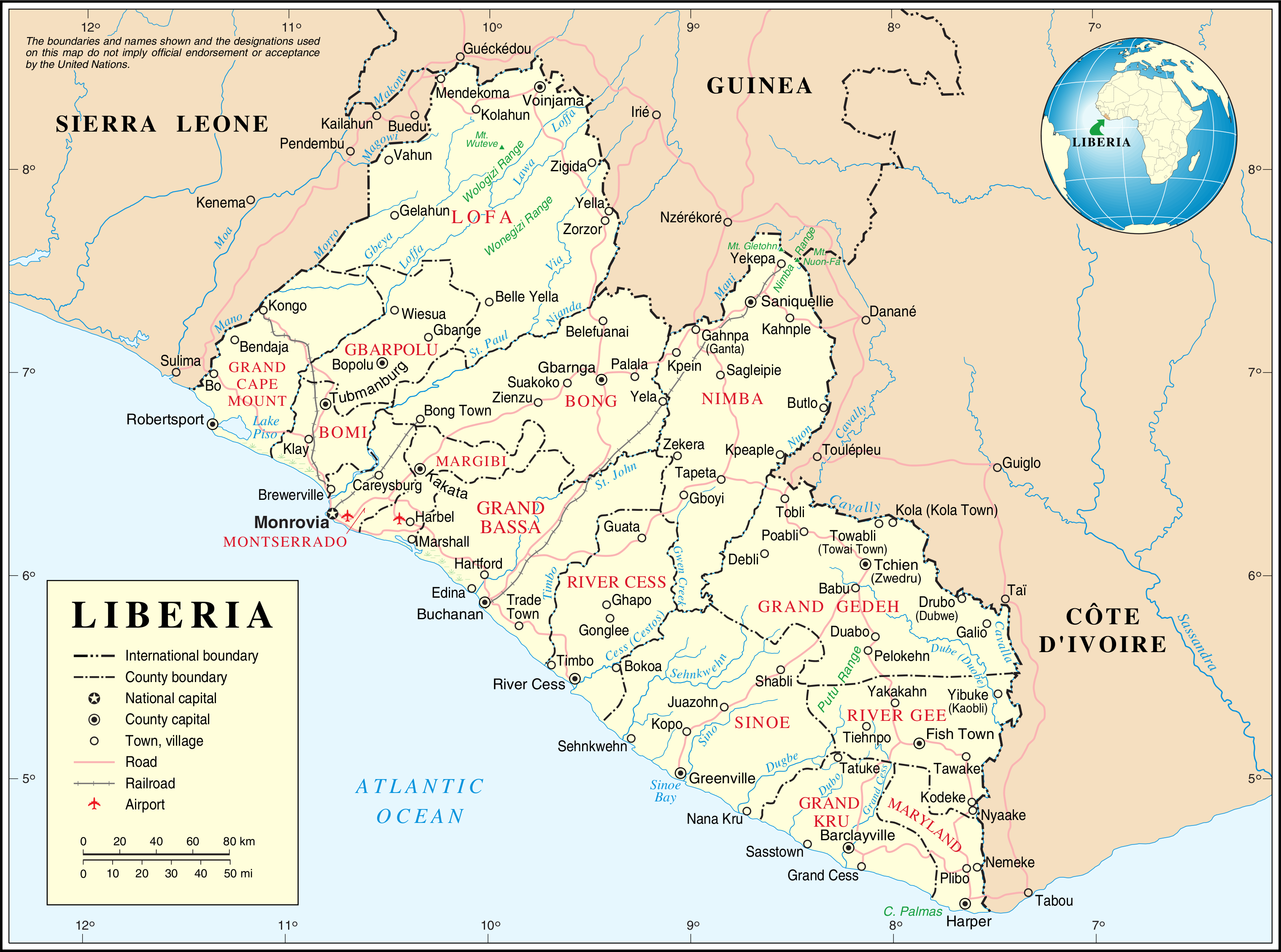
- Liberia
- Date: 19 September 2005
- Meeting no.: 5,263
- Code: S/RES/1626 (Document)
- Subject: The situation in Liberia
- Voting summary: 15 voted for; None voted against; None abstained
- Result: Adopted

Security Council composition
- Permanent members: China; France; Russia; United Kingdom; United States
- Non-permanent members: Algeria; Argentina; Benin; Brazil; Denmark; Greece; Japan; Philippines; Romania; Tanzania

United Nations Security Council resolution 1626, adopted unanimously on 19 September 2005, after recalling all previous resolutions on the situations in Liberia and Sierra Leone, particularly resolutions 1509 (2003), 1610 (2005) and 1620 (2005), the Council extended the mandate of the United Nations Mission in Liberia (UNMIL) until 31 March 2006 and authorised the deployment of 250 troops to Sierra Leone to protect the Special Court.

== Resolution ==
=== Observations ===
The Security Council recognised the important role that the Economic Community of West African States (ECOWAS) and African Union (AU) were playing in the Liberian process in addition to that of the United Nations. It welcomed progress made in preparations towards the general elections in October 2005 and efforts made by the transitional government towards the lifting of sanctions imposed by Resolution 1521 (2003).

The preamble of the resolution also welcomed the work of the Special Court for Sierra Leone, noting that the United Nations Mission in Sierra Leone (UNAMSIL) was ending its mission on 31 December 2005 and the need for continued protection of the court.

=== Acts ===
Acting under Chapter VII of the United Nations Charter, the Council extended the mandate of UNMIL and called upon the Liberian authorities to ensure free, fair and transparent elections. The international community was urged to provide resources to meet needs relating to ex-combatants and reform of the security sector.

UNMIL was authorised to deploy 250 personnel to Sierra Leone to protect the Special Court, and at the same time, a temporary increase of UNMIL personnel was ordered until 31 March 2006. Furthermore, UNMIL was also authorised to deploy military personnel to Sierra Leone if needed to evacuate personnel there in the event of an emergency. The United Nations Integrated Office in Sierra Leone (UNIOSIL) was instructed to provide support for UNMIL personnel deployed in Sierra Leone.

The resolution asked the Secretary-General Kofi Annan and government of Sierra Leone to conclude an agreement regarding the status of UNMIL military personnel in the country. United Nations missions in the region were encouraged to pursue intermission co-operation in order to prevent arms trafficking, movement of combatants, the illegal exploitation of natural resources and the implementation of disarmament, demobilisation and reintegration programmes.

Finally, the Secretary-General was required to provide a drawdown assessment for UNMIL in his March 2006 report.

== See also ==
- List of United Nations Security Council Resolutions 1601 to 1700 (2005–2006)
- Second Liberian Civil War
- Sierra Leone Civil War
