= United Nations Security Council Resolution 1647 =

UN Security Council Resolution 1647
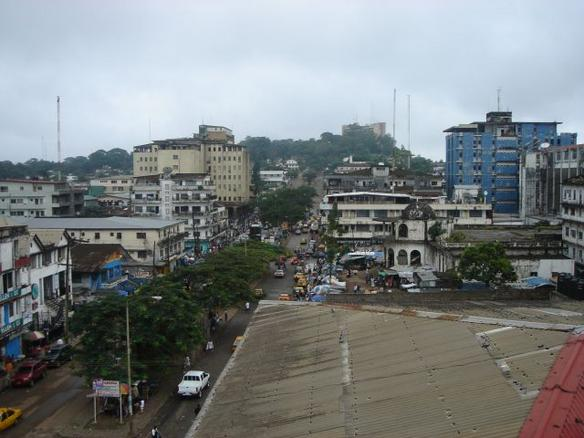
- The Liberian capital Monrovia
- Date: 20 December 2005
- Meeting no.: 5,336
- Code: S/RES/1647 (Document)
- Subject: The situation in Liberia
- Voting summary: 15 voted for; None voted against; None abstained
- Result: Adopted

Security Council composition
- Permanent members: China; France; Russia; United Kingdom; United States
- Non-permanent members: Algeria; Argentina; Benin; Brazil; Denmark; Greece; Japan; Philippines; Romania; Tanzania

United Nations Security Council Resolution 1647, adopted unanimously on 20 December 2005, after recalling all previous resolutions on the situations in Liberia and West Africa, the Council extended sanctions including an arms embargo, bans on the sale of diamonds and timber and restrictions on travel for certain officials.

== Resolution ==
=== Observations ===
The Security Council began by welcoming the successful conduct of elections in Liberia, which it viewed as an important step towards the peace and stability of the country. It welcomed the commitment of Ellen Johnson-Sirleaf to rebuild Liberia to benefit the people.

Meanwhile, the Council concluded that "insufficient progress" had been made with respect to meeting the conditions of resolutions 1521 (2003) and 1532 (2004), which imposed sanctions on Liberia.

=== Acts ===
Acting under Chapter VII of the United Nations Charter, the Council extended the arms embargo and travel restrictions for a period of twelve months, and restrictions on the sale of diamonds and timber for a period of six months. The measures would be reviewed at the request of the Liberian government.

The resolution welcomed the determination of President Ellen Johnson-Sirleaf to meet the criteria required and encouraged the new government of the country to engage in forestry reform and management of diamond resources. Furthermore, it welcomed assistance provided to the Liberian government by the United Nations Mission in Liberia.

An expert panel monitoring the implementation of sanctions against the country had its mandate extended until 21 June 2006.

== See also ==
- List of United Nations Security Council Resolutions 1601 to 1700 (2005–2006)
- Second Liberian Civil War
