= United Nations Security Council Resolution 1605 =

UN Security Council Resolution 1605
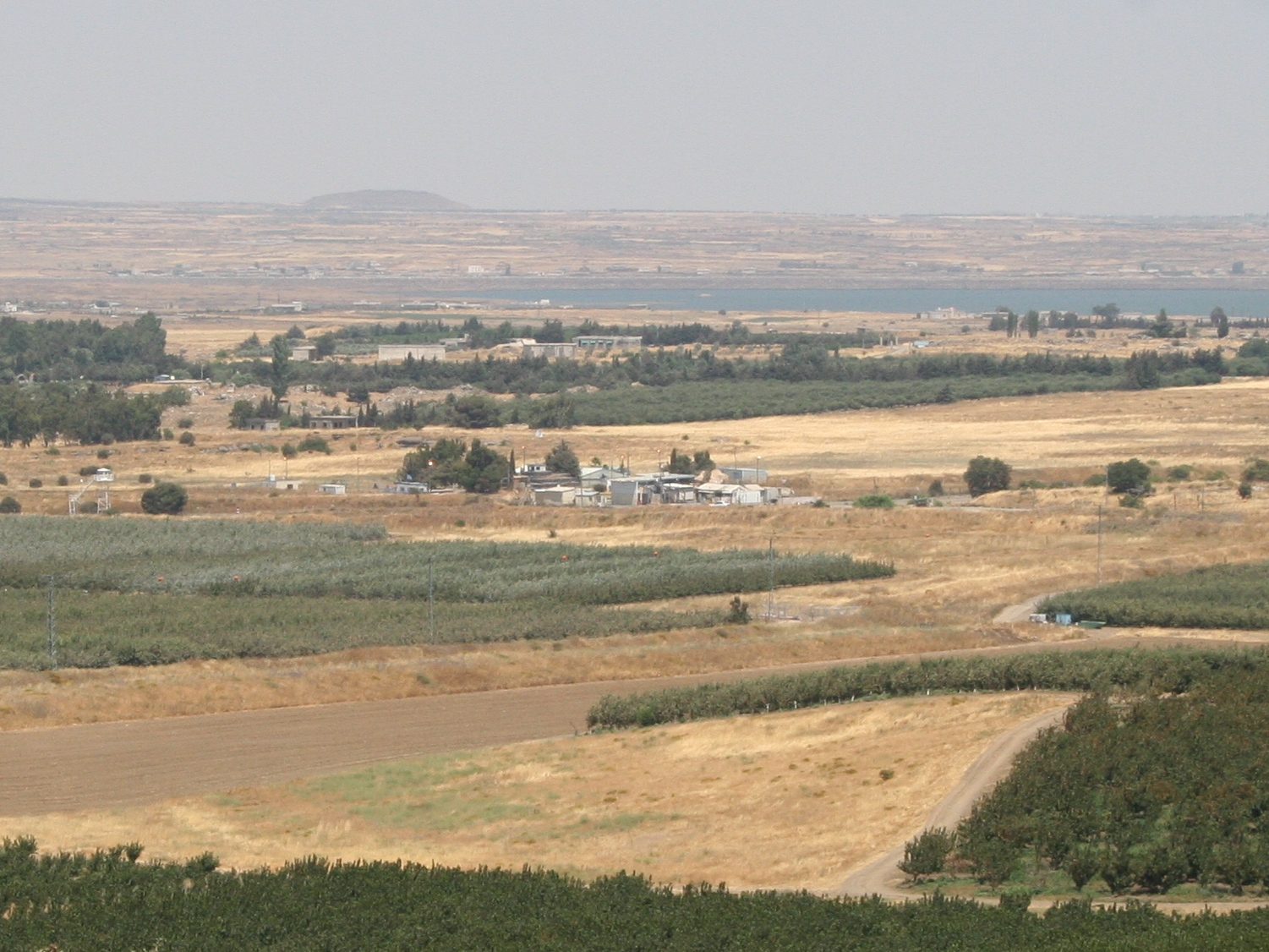
- Border crossing between Israel and Syria
- Date: 17 June 2005
- Meeting no.: 5,205
- Code: S/RES/1605 (Document)
- Subject: The situation in the Middle East
- Voting summary: 15 voted for; None voted against; None abstained
- Result: Adopted

Security Council composition
- Permanent members: China; France; Russia; United Kingdom; United States
- Non-permanent members: Algeria; Argentina; Benin; Brazil; Denmark; Greece; Japan; Philippines; Romania; Tanzania

United Nations Security Council resolution 1605, adopted unanimously on 17 June 2005, after considering a report by the secretary-general Kofi Annan regarding the United Nations Disengagement Observer Force (UNDOF), the council extended its mandate for a further six months until 31 December 2005.

The resolution called upon the parties concerned to immediately implement Resolution 338 (1973) and requested that the secretary-general submit a report on the situation at the end of that period.

The secretary-general's report pursuant to the previous resolution on UNDOF said that the situation between Israel and Syria had remained generally quiet, though the situation in the Middle East as a whole remained dangerous until a settlement could be reached.

The council also welcomed efforts by UNDOF to implement the zero-tolerance sexual exploitation policy.

== See also ==
- Arab–Israeli conflict
- Golan Heights
- Israel–Syria relations
- List of United Nations Security Council Resolutions 1601 to 1700 (2005–2006)
- 2000–2006 Shebaa Farms conflict
