= United Nations Security Council Resolution 1607 =

UN Security Council Resolution 1607
- Flag of Liberia
- Date: 21 June 2005
- Meeting no.: 5,208
- Code: S/RES/1607 (Document)
- Subject: The situation in Liberia
- Voting summary: 15 voted for; None voted against; None abstained
- Result: Adopted

Security Council composition
- Permanent members: China; France; Russia; United Kingdom; United States
- Non-permanent members: Algeria; Argentina; Benin; Brazil; Denmark; Greece; Japan; Philippines; Romania; Tanzania

United Nations Security Council Resolution 1607, adopted unanimously on 21 June 2005, after recalling all previous resolutions on the situation in Liberia, the Council extended the embargo on Liberian diamonds for a further six months.

== Resolution ==
=== Observations ===
The security council recognised the link between the illegal exploitation of resources such as diamonds and timber, illicit arms trafficking and the conflicts in West Africa, particularly in Liberia. In this regard, it noted that measures imposed in Resolution 1521 (2003) were intended to stop fueling the conflict.

The preamble of the resolution also expressed concern that former President Charles Taylor and close associates were engaging in activities that were undermining peace and stability in the region. It noted the completion of the disarmament and demobilisation processes, respect for the ceasefire, and implementation of a peace agreement. There was concern that the transitional government had limited control over some areas of the country and continuing challenges.

=== Acts ===
Acting under Chapter VII of the United Nations Charter, the council decided to renew sanctions against Liberia relating to diamonds, while reiterating that it would lift the measures once the transitional government had met its conditions, including establishing a certificate of origin regime. The transitional government was urged to undertake forestry reforms and advice on its management of timber and diamonds. Financial sanctions against Charles Taylor imposed in Resolution 1532 (2004) would remain in place and all states were reminded to implement all sanctions.

Meanwhile, a five-member expert panel appointed pursuant to Resolution 1549 (2004) by the Secretary-General Kofi Annan was re-established until 21 December 2005, to monitor the implementation and impact of the sanctions. The panel would report on whether Liberia had met the conditions for the lifting of the sanctions.

It was also necessary that the United Nations Mission in Liberia (UNMIL), the committee established by Resolution 1521 and the expert panel continue to monitor the implementation of the measures and any violations, and the transitional government in its recruitment and movement of ex-combatants.

== See also ==
- List of United Nations Security Council Resolutions 1601 to 1700 (2005–2006)
- Second Liberian Civil War
