= United Nations Security Council Resolution 1610 =

UN Security Council Resolution 1610
- Flag of Sierra Leone
- Date: 30 June 2005
- Meeting no.: 5,219
- Code: S/RES/1610 (Document)
- Subject: The situation in Sierra Leone
- Voting summary: 15 voted for; None voted against; None abstained
- Result: Adopted

Security Council composition
- Permanent members: China; France; Russia; United Kingdom; United States
- Non-permanent members: Algeria; Argentina; Benin; Brazil; Denmark; Greece; Japan; Philippines; Romania; Tanzania

United Nations Security Council resolution 1610, adopted unanimously on 30 June 2005, after recalling all previous resolutions on the situation in Sierra Leone, the Council extended the mandate of the United Nations Mission in Sierra Leone (UNAMSIL) for a final six months until 31 December 2005.

== Resolution ==
=== Observations ===
In the preamble of the resolution, the council emphasised the importance of long-term support for Sierra Leone by the United Nations and international community. The Secretary-General Kofi Annan had approved the drawdown schedule for UNAMSIL and the need for a strong United Nations presence in Sierra Leone once it had left. It welcomed the work of the Truth and Reconciliation Commission and the Special Court for Sierra Leone.

=== Acts ===
Acting under Chapter VII of the United Nations Charter, the council extended the mandate of UNAMSIL until the end of 2005. The secretary-general was required to finalise arrangements for a United Nations system presence in Sierra Leone, urging a smooth transition as Sierra Leonean security forces would assume responsibility after the withdrawal of UNAMSIL.

Meanwhile, the government of Sierra Leone was called upon to develop an effective and sustainable police force, armed forces, judiciary and penal system. The council also asked United Nations peacekeeping operations in the region to enhance co-operation.

== See also ==
- Ivorian Civil War
- List of United Nations Security Council Resolutions 1601 to 1700 (2005–2006)
- Second Liberian Civil War
- Sierra Leone Civil War
- Special Court for Sierra Leone
