= United Nations Security Council Resolution 1648 =

UN Security Council Resolution 1648
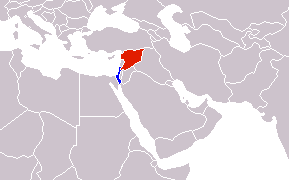
- Israel (blue) and Syria (red)
- Date: 21 December 2005
- Meeting no.: 5,339
- Code: S/RES/1648 (Document)
- Subject: The situation in the Middle East
- Voting summary: 15 voted for; None voted against; None abstained
- Result: Adopted

Security Council composition
- Permanent members: China; France; Russia; United Kingdom; United States
- Non-permanent members: Algeria; Argentina; Benin; Brazil; Denmark; Greece; Japan; Philippines; Romania; Tanzania

United Nations Security Council Resolution 1648, adopted unanimously on 21 December 2005, after considering a report by the Secretary-General Kofi Annan regarding the United Nations Disengagement Observer Force (UNDOF), the Council extended its mandate for a further six months until 30 June 2006.

The resolution called upon the parties concerned to immediately implement Resolution 338 (1973) and requested that the Secretary-General submit a report on the situation at the end of that period.

The secretary-general's report pursuant to the previous resolution on UNDOF said that the situation between Israel and Syria had remained generally quiet, though the situation in the Middle East as a whole remained tense until a settlement could be reached.

The council also welcomed efforts by UNDOF to implement the zero-tolerance sexual exploitation policy.

== See also ==
- Arab–Israeli conflict
- Golan Heights
- Israel–Syria relations
- List of United Nations Security Council Resolutions 1601 to 1700 (2005–2006)
- 2000–2006 Shebaa Farms conflict
