= United Nations Security Council Resolution 1683 =

UN Security Council Resolution 1683
- Location of Liberia within the African Union
- Date: 13 June 2006
- Meeting no.: 5,454
- Code: S/RES/1683 (Document)
- Subject: The situation in Liberia
- Voting summary: 15 voted for; None voted against; None abstained
- Result: Adopted

Security Council composition
- Permanent members: China; France; Russia; United Kingdom; United States
- Non-permanent members: Argentina; Rep. of the Congo; Denmark; Ghana; Greece; Japan; Peru; Qatar; Slovakia; Tanzania

United Nations Security Council Resolution 1683, was adopted unanimously on June 13, 2006, after recalling all previous resolutions on the situation in Liberia and West Africa. The Council adjusted the arms embargo against the country so that weapons and ammunition could be used for training purposes by the government, police and security forces.

Liberia welcomed the resolution, but urged sanctions relating to timber and diamonds to be lifted.

== Resolution ==
=== Observations ===
The Council began by welcoming the role of President Ellen Johnson Sirleaf in her efforts to restore, peace and stability to Liberia. It emphasised that the United Nations Mission in Liberia (UNMIL) would support the Liberian government to build a democratic nation.

The resolution recognised that the Liberian police and security forces needed to assume greater responsibility for national security. Furthermore, progress had been made in Liberia but the situation continued to constitute a threat to peace and security in the region.

=== Acts ===
Under Chapter VII of the United Nations Charter, the Council decided that measures imposed in Resolution 1521 (2003) would not apply to weapons and ammunition supplied to members of the government, security service and police for training purposes. The items would be approved on a case-by-case basis by the Committee established in that resolution only for the use of personnel trained and vetted since UNMIL's inception in October 2003.

Furthermore, weapons and ammunition requested would subsequently be marked and a registry of them maintained. UNMIL was required to inspect inventories of weapons and ammunition obtained and report to the Committee on its findings.

Finally, the resolution reiterated the continuing importance of UNMIL co-operation with the Committee, Liberian government and expert panel monitoring the implementation of sanctions against the country.

== See also ==
- List of United Nations Security Council Resolutions 1601 to 1700 (2005–2006)
- Second Liberian Civil War
