= United Nations Security Council Resolution 1667 =

UN Security Council Resolution 1667
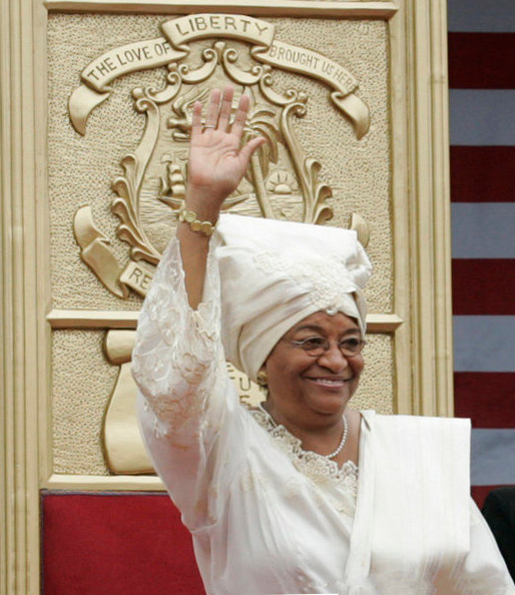
- Ellen Johnson Sirleaf who was inaugurated as President in 2006
- Date: 31 March 2006
- Meeting no.: 5,406
- Code: S/RES/1667 (Document)
- Subject: The situation in Liberia
- Voting summary: 15 voted for; None voted against; None abstained
- Result: Adopted

Security Council composition
- Permanent members: China; France; Russia; United Kingdom; United States
- Non-permanent members: Argentina; Rep. of the Congo; Denmark; Ghana; Greece; Japan; Peru; Qatar; Slovakia; Tanzania

United Nations Security Council Resolution 1667, adopted unanimously on March 31, 2006, after recalling all previous resolutions on the situations in Liberia and the subregion, particularly resolutions 1626 (2005) and 1638 (2005), the Council extended the mandate of the United Nations Mission in Liberia (UNMIL) until September 30, 2006.

== Resolution ==
=== Observations ===
The Security Council recognised the important role that the Economic Community of West African States (ECOWAS) and African Union (AU) were playing in the Liberian process in addition to that of the international community. It welcomed the inauguration of Ellen Johnson Sirleaf as President of Liberia and the installation of a newly elected government, and acknowledged the existence of remaining challenges in the country.

Meanwhile, Council members welcomed the transfer of former President Charles Taylor to the Special Court for Sierra Leone.

=== Acts ===
Acting under Chapter VII of the United Nations Charter, the Council extended UNMIL's mandate and the temporary increase in its personnel size. It reaffirmed its intention to authorise the Secretary-General Kofi Annan to redeploy troops between UNMIL and the United Nations Operation in Côte d'Ivoire (UNOCI) on a temporary basis in accordance with Resolution 1609 (2005). In this context, a review would take place of UNOCI's tasks and troop level with a decision on its possible reinforcement.

Finally, the Secretary-General was asked to present his plans regarding the drawdown of UNMIL to the Security Council.

== See also ==
- List of United Nations Security Council Resolutions 1601 to 1700 (2005–2006)
- Second Liberian Civil War
