= United Nations Security Council Resolution 1622 =

UN Security Council Resolution 1622
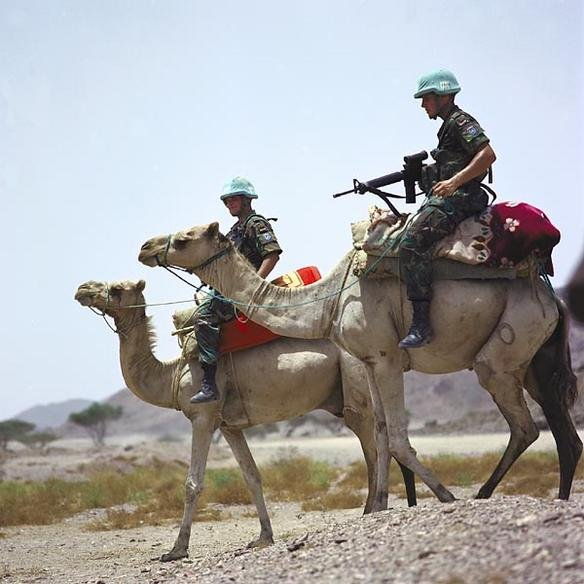
- UNMEE peacekeepers in Eritrea
- Date: 13 September 2005
- Meeting no.: 5,259
- Code: S/RES/1622 (Document)
- Subject: The situation between Eritrea and Ethiopia
- Voting summary: 15 voted for; None voted against; None abstained
- Result: Adopted

Security Council composition
- Permanent members: China; France; Russia; United Kingdom; United States
- Non-permanent members: Algeria; Argentina; Benin; Brazil; Denmark; Greece; Japan; Philippines; Romania; Tanzania

United Nations Security Council resolution 1622, adopted unanimously on 13 September 2005, after reaffirming all resolutions on the situation between Eritrea and Ethiopia, particularly Resolution 1586 (2005), the Council extended the mandate of the United Nations Mission in Ethiopia and Eritrea (UNMEE) until 15 March 2006.

Eritrea branded the resolution as "toothless, meaningless and pathetic".

== Resolution ==
=== Observations ===
The Security Council reaffirmed its support for the peace process between the two countries and of the role played by UNMEE in facilitating the implementation of the Algiers Agreement and decision by the Boundary Commission on the mutual border. It expressed concern at the lack of implementation on the demarcation of the border as ruled by the Ethiopia-Eritrea Boundary Commission, and stated that full peace in the region could not be achieved without this.

The resolution expressed concern at the high concentration of troops near to the Temporary Security Zone (TSZ), and noted recommendations by the Secretary-General Kofi Annan on ways to resolve the political stalemate between the two countries.

=== Acts ===
The resolution extended UNMEE's mandate until 15 March 2006, and approved a reconfiguration of the operation and an increase in the number of military observers by 10 personnel. Both parties were urged to fulfil their commitments under the Algiers Agreement and implement the decision of the Boundary Commission in order for it to fulfil its mandate. The parties were further called upon to co-operate with UNMEE and protect United Nations personnel, and refrain from increasing troops in areas adjacent to the TSZ and threatening the use of force. There was concern at the worsening humanitarian situation in both Ethiopia and Eritrea.

The Council reaffirmed the importance of dialogue between the two countries and the normalisation of their diplomatic relations. Meanwhile, Eritrea was called upon to re-open the Asmara to Barentu road to UNMEE traffic, and lift restrictions on the operations of humanitarian aid organisations.

Finally, the Secretary-General was asked to closely monitor the situation and review UNMEE's mandate in light of any progress in the peace process.

== See also ==
- Badme
- Eritrean–Ethiopian War
- List of United Nations Security Council Resolutions 1601 to 1700 (2005–2006)
