= United Nations Security Council Resolution 1640 =

UN Security Council Resolution 1640
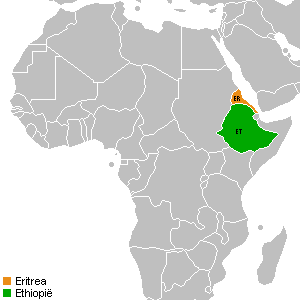
- Ethiopia (green) and Eritrea (orange)
- Date: 23 November 2005
- Meeting no.: 5,308
- Code: S/RES/1640 (Document)
- Subject: The situation between Eritrea and Ethiopia
- Voting summary: 15 voted for; None voted against; None abstained
- Result: Adopted

Security Council composition
- Permanent members: China; France; Russia; United Kingdom; United States
- Non-permanent members: Algeria; Argentina; Benin; Brazil; Denmark; Greece; Japan; Philippines; Romania; Tanzania

United Nations Security Council resolution 1640, adopted unanimously on 23 November 2005, after reaffirming all resolutions on the situation between Eritrea and Ethiopia, particularly Resolution 1622 (2005), the Council demanded that Eritrea lift restrictions on the movement of the United Nations Mission in Ethiopia and Eritrea (UNMEE).

The resolution was passed after the Security Council threatened sanctions on both countries if war broke out. Ethiopian troops briefly breached the demilitarised zone and Eritrea dismissed the resolution as a reflection of "the narrow interests of [the world's] major powers".

== Resolution ==
=== Observations ===
In the preamble of the resolution, the Council expressed concern at the Eritrean government's decision to restrict the movement of UNMEE in Eritrea from 5 October 2005, and additional limitations on its freedom of movement that implications for UNMEE's ability to carry out its mandate. It was alarmed by such measures and their impact on the maintenance of peace and security between Eritrea and Ethiopia.

The Security Council reaffirmed the role of the Temporary Security Zone (TSZ) as provided for in the Algiers Agreement, and stressed that peace could not be achieved without the demarcation of their mutual border. There was also concern at the failure of the Ethiopian government to accept the binding decision of the boundary commission, and the high concentration of troops on both sides of the TSZ.

=== Acts ===
The Council condemned restrictions placed by Eritrea on its UNMEE mission, and demanded their full reversal. It called on both Ethiopia and Eritrea to exercise restraint and refrain from threats and the use of force, and to return their deployment of forces to 16 December 2004 levels. The Secretary-General Kofi Annan was requested to report within 40 days on compliance with Security Council demands.

The resolution concluded by urging Ethiopia to accept the decision of the Ethiopia-Eritrea Boundary Commission, and welcoming efforts of UNMEE troop-contributing countries.

== See also ==
- Badme
- Eritrean–Ethiopian War
- List of United Nations Security Council Resolutions 1601 to 1700 (2005–2006)
