= United Nations Security Council Resolution 1650 =

UN Security Council Resolution 1650
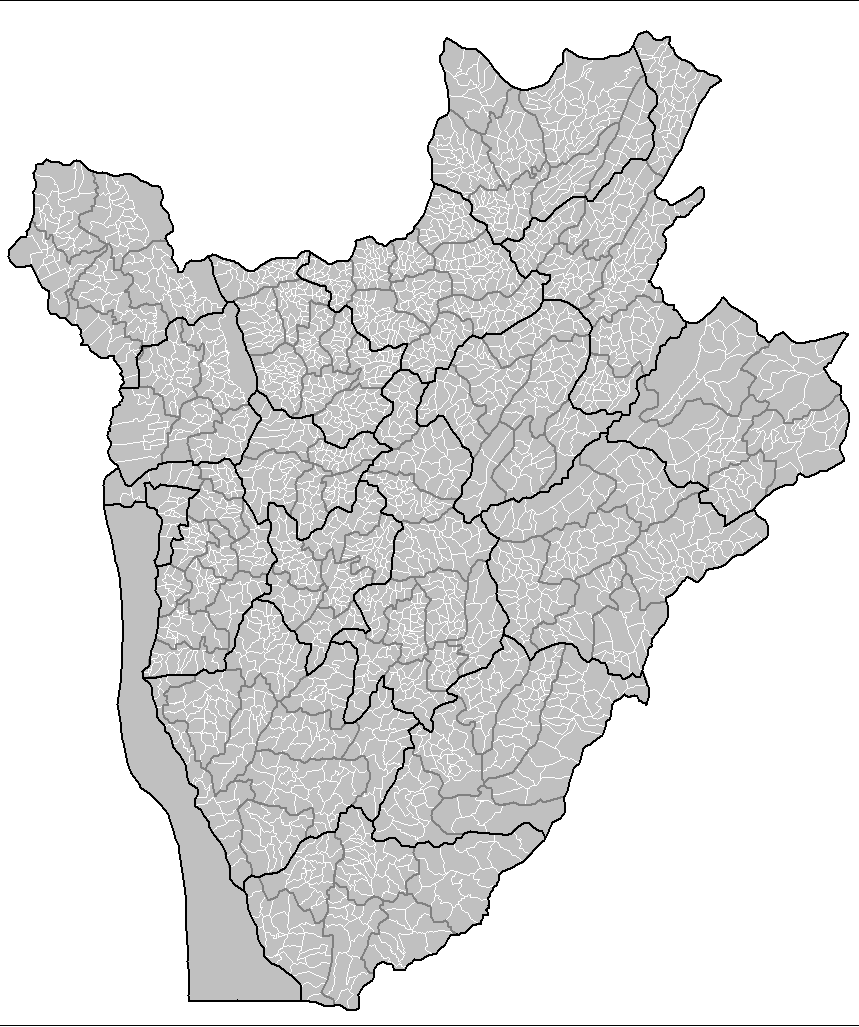
- Burundi
- Date: 21 December 2005
- Meeting no.: 5,341
- Code: S/RES/1650 (Document)
- Subject: The situation in Burundi
- Voting summary: 15 voted for; None voted against; None abstained
- Result: Adopted

Security Council composition
- Permanent members: China; France; Russia; United Kingdom; United States
- Non-permanent members: Algeria; Argentina; Benin; Brazil; Denmark; Greece; Japan; Philippines; Romania; Tanzania

United Nations Security Council Resolution 1650, adopted unanimously on 21 December 2005, after recalling Resolution 1545 (2004) regarding the situation in Burundi, the Council extended the mandate of the United Nations Operation in Burundi (ONUB) until 1 July 2006.

== Resolution ==
=== Observations ===
The Security Council praised the Burundian people for the completion of the transitional period where authority had been transferred to democratically elected government and institutions. It praised the African Union and ONUB for their contributions to the transition in Burundi, and encouraged the Burundian authorities themselves to continue to promote the stability of the country and national reconciliation.

The resolution noted the need for the implementation of further reforms, and remained concern at the activities of the Palipehutu. It recognised that, although there was an improvement in the security situation, there were still "factors of instability" present in Burundi and the Great Lakes region of Africa.

=== Acts ===
Acting under Chapter VII of the United Nations Charter, the Security Council extended the mandate of ONUB and welcomed discussions between the Secretary-General Kofi Annan and the Burundian government concerning the gradual disengagement of the United Nations peacekeeping presence and adjustments to its mandate.

The text authorised the temporary redeployment of military and civilian police personnel among ONUB and the United Nations Mission in the Democratic Republic of the Congo (MONUC), requesting the Secretary-General to begin discussions with countries contributing troops to those missions on the conditions for such redeployments.

Meanwhile, the Burundian government was urged to finalise the disarmament, demobilisation, and reintegration process, and welcomed its willingness to conclude an agreement with the Palipehutu. There was concern at reported violations of human rights, and international organisations were called upon to continue to provide assistance to the development of Burundi.

== See also ==
- Burundi Civil War
- List of United Nations Security Council Resolutions 1601 to 1700 (2005–2006)
