= United Nations Security Council Resolution 1645 =

UN Security Council Resolution 1645
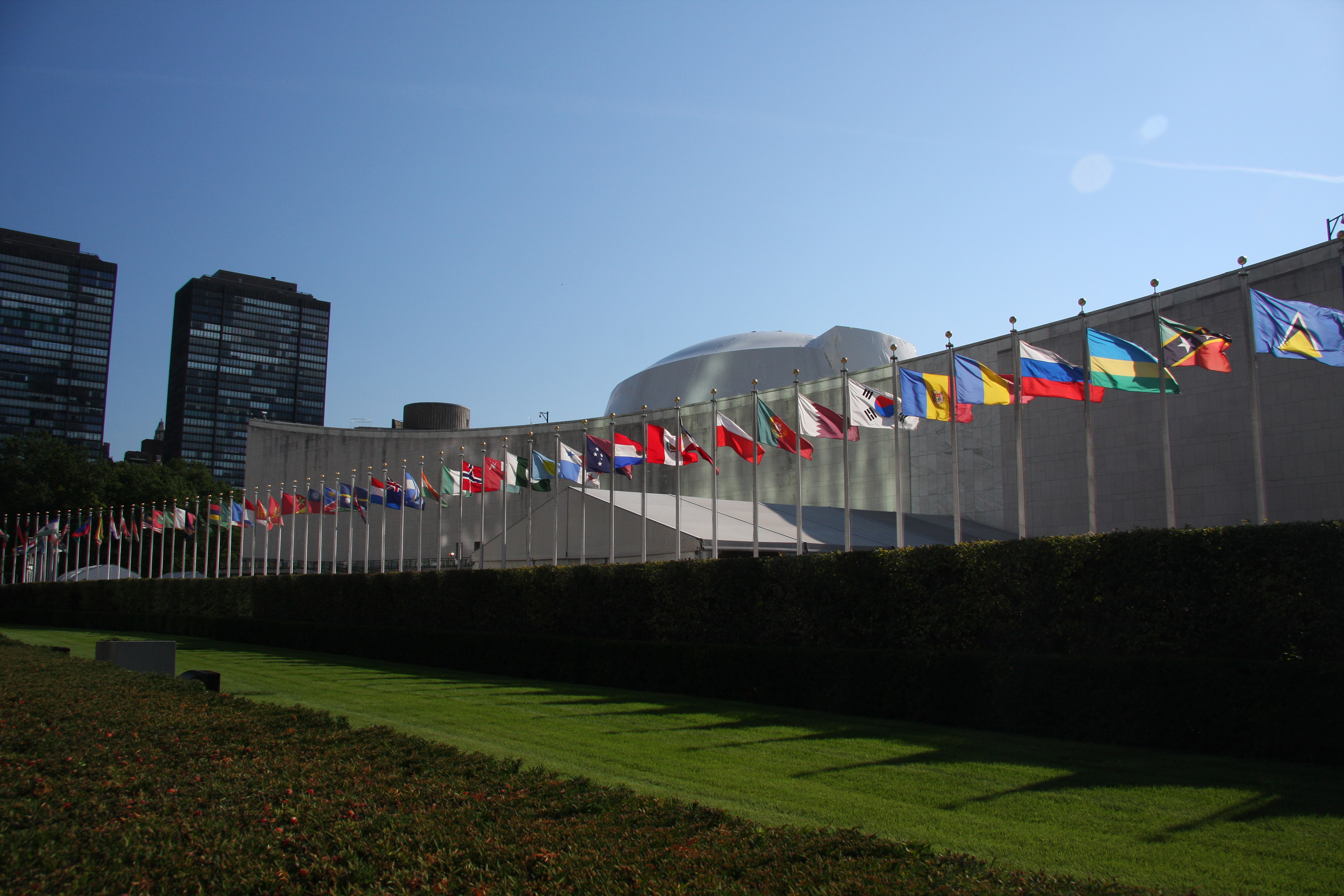
- United Nations General Assembly Building
- Date: 20 December 2005
- Meeting no.: 5,335
- Code: S/RES/1645 (Document)
- Subject: Post-conflict peacebuilding
- Voting summary: 15 voted for; None voted against; None abstained
- Result: Adopted

Security Council composition
- Permanent members: China; France; Russia; United Kingdom; United States
- Non-permanent members: Algeria; Argentina; Benin; Brazil; Denmark; Greece; Japan; Philippines; Romania; Tanzania

United Nations Security Council Resolution 1645, adopted unanimously on 20 December 2005, acting concurrently with the United Nations General Assembly, the council established the United Nations Peacebuilding Commission to advise on post-conflict situations, in accordance with the declaration of the 2005 World Summit.

== Resolution ==
=== Observations ===
In the preamble of the resolution, the council reaffirmed the outcome of the 2005 World Summit and recognised that human rights, development, peace and security are mutually reinforcing and connected. There was a need for a co-ordinated, coherent and integrated approach to post-conflict peacebuilding and reconciliation, while the council also recognised the important role of the United Nations in the conflict prevention and efforts towards reconciliation.

The text reaffirmed the primary responsibility of national governments for determining post-conflict priorities and strategies, while the role of all countries, civil society, regional organisations and non-governmental organisations were important in peacebuilding.

=== Acts ===
In unison with the general assembly, the Peacebuilding Commission was established as an intergovernmental advisory body. The main goals of the commission were to bring together all stakeholders to advise and propose strategies for building peace and reconciliation after a conflict, to focus on the restoration of state institutions and make recommendations to improve co-ordination within and outside the United Nations.

The resolution then set out the composition of the commission, to include seven members of the security council, seven members of the United Nations Economic and Social Council, the top five providers to the United Nations budget, the top five providers to United Nations peacekeeping missions, with representation from all regional groups. It also discussed country-specific meetings of the commission, where representatives of the World Bank and International Monetary Fund, among others, could participate. The Peacebuilding Commission was encouraged to co-operate with international organisations as appropriate, and provide advice to the council in matter with which it is seized.

== See also ==
- Conflict resolution
- List of United Nations Security Council Resolutions 1601 to 1700 (2005–2006)
- Peacekeeping
- Peacemaking
