= United Nations Security Council Resolution 1652 =

UN Security Council Resolution 1652
- Location of Côte d'Ivoire within the African Union
- Date: 24 January 2006
- Meeting no.: 5,354
- Code: S/RES/1652 (Document)
- Subject: The situation in Côte d'Ivoire
- Voting summary: 15 voted for; None voted against; None abstained
- Result: Adopted

Security Council composition
- Permanent members: China; France; Russia; United Kingdom; United States
- Non-permanent members: Argentina; Rep. of the Congo; Denmark; Ghana; Greece; Japan; Peru; Qatar; Slovakia; Tanzania

United Nations Security Council Resolution 1652, adopted unanimously on January 24, 2006, after recalling previous resolutions on the situation in Côte d'Ivoire (Ivory Coast), the Council extended the mandate of the United Nations Operation in Côte d'Ivoire (UNOCI) and supporting French forces until December 15, 2006. It was the first of 86 Security Council resolutions adopted in 2006, and the first of eight relating to the situation in Côte d'Ivoire.

== Resolution ==
=== Observations ===
The Security Council was very concerned about the ongoing political crisis in Côte d'Ivoire, and obstacles to the peace process from all sides. The International Working Group, established by the African Union, was to monitor the implementation of the peace process in the run-up to proposed elections by the end of October 2006 (they did not take place).

=== Acts ===
Acting under Chapter VII of the United Nations Charter, the Council extended the mandates of UNOCI and the French supporting forces in Opération Licorne until mid-December, 2006. It renewed provisions of Resolution 1609 (2005), renewing the increase in UNOCI's strength in terms of military and police personnel.

Finally, Council members expressed their intention to keep the operations and troop levels of UNOCI under review, pending a report by the Secretary-General Kofi Annan on Liberia which would take into account the situations in Liberia and Côte d'Ivoire.

== See also ==
- First Ivorian Civil War
- List of United Nations Security Council Resolutions 1601 to 1700 (2005–2006)
- Opération Licorne
- United Nations Operation in Côte d'Ivoire
