= Mandate (international law) =

Obligation handed down by an inter-governmental body

In international law, a mandate is a binding obligation issued from an inter-governmental organisation (e.g. the United Nations) to a country which is bound to follow the instructions of the organisation.

Before the creation of the United Nations, all mandates were issued from the League of Nations. Australian New Guinea, officially known as the Territory of Papua, is an example of such a mandate.

== See also ==
- League of Nations mandate
- UN Mandate
