= United Nations Security Council Resolution 1941 =

UN Security Council Resolution 1941
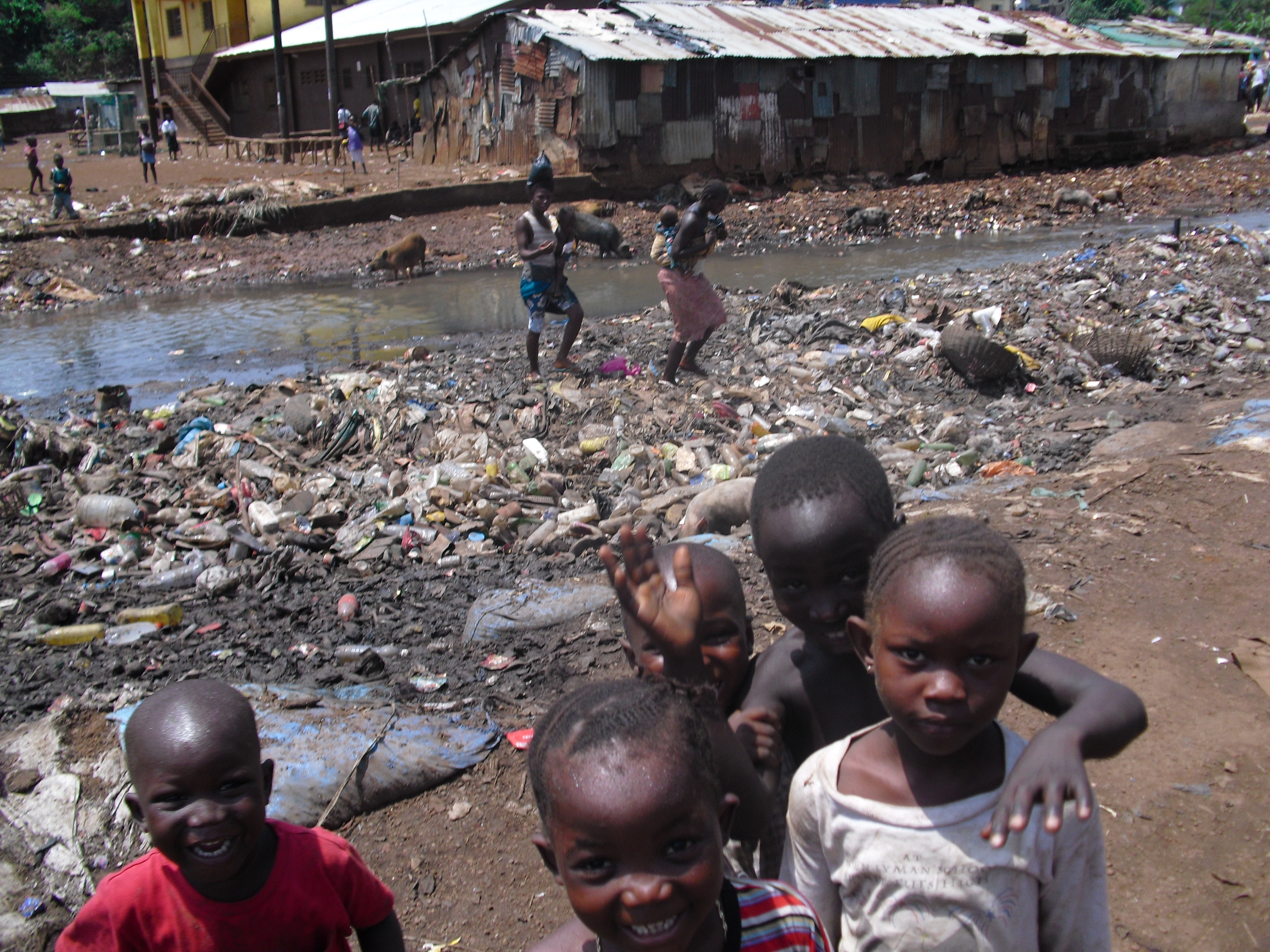
- Children at a dump in Sierra Leone
- Date: 29 September 2010
- Meeting no.: 6,392
- Code: S/RES/1941 (Document)
- Subject: The situation in Sierra Leone
- Voting summary: 15 voted for; None voted against; None abstained
- Result: Adopted

Security Council composition
- Permanent members: China; France; Russia; United Kingdom; United States
- Non-permanent members: Austria; Bosnia–Herzegovina; Brazil; Gabon; Japan; Lebanon; Mexico; Nigeria; Turkey; Uganda

United Nations Security Council Resolution 1941, adopted unanimously on September 29, 2010, after recalling all previous resolutions on the situation in Sierra Leone, particularly Resolution 1886 (2009), the Council extended the mandate of the United Nations Integrated Peacebuilding Office in Sierra Leone (UNIPSIL) until September 15, 2011.

== Resolution ==
=== Observations ===
The preamble of the resolution began by welcoming a visit to Sierra Leone by the Secretary-General Ban Ki-moon and praised the role of UNIPSIL in the country. It endorsed Ban Ki-moon's recommendation that the mandate of UNIPSIL, outlined in resolutions 1829 (2008) and 1886 (2009), be extended for a further year to assist the Government of Sierra Leone with general elections in 2012. In this regard, the Council noted that tensions could increase prior to the elections due to political, security, socio-economic and humanitarian challenges, and the international community was called upon to create an environment to allow the conduct of free and fair elections.

The resolution noted continued political efforts undertaken by the government and other political parties. It stressed that the work of the Special Court for Sierra Leone and the trial of former Liberian president Charles Taylor was important. Resolution 1940 (2010), which ended the arms embargo and other sanctions against the country, was highlighted, along with the importance of controlling the circulation of weapons within Sierra Leone and nearby states at a local level. The Economic Community of West African States (ECOWAS), Mano River Union and others were urged to continue dialogue to consolidate regional peace and security.

=== Acts ===
Extending UNIPSIL's mandate for an additional twelve months, it was also tasked with focusing on:

(a) providing assistance for the 2012 elections;
(b) promoting conflict prevention and mitigation efforts, and dialogue among political parties;
(c) assisting the government and institutions in tackling youth unemployment;
(d) promoting good governance, rule of law and human rights; combatting illegal drug trafficking, corruption, organised crime and money laundering; assisting with border control.

The Sierra Leonean government was urged to combat corruption, promote accountability, good governance reform and development of the private sector with assistance from UNIPSIL. Greater efforts were required to enhance the integration and effectiveness of United Nations efforts on the ground and the Secretary-General was requested to report on achievement of benchmarks including the transition of UNIPSIL into a country team. He was asked to report every six months on progress made.

The Council stressed that the government was responsible for peacebuilding, security and the long-term development of the country. Furthermore, it was called upon to promote national unity and reconciliation, while it was praised for recognising the role of women in the prevention of conflicts and peacebuilding.

== See also ==
- List of United Nations Security Council Resolutions 1901 to 2000 (2009–2011)
- Second Liberian Civil War
- Sierra Leone Civil War
- Special Court for Sierra Leone
