= United Nations Security Council Resolution 1734 =

UN Security Council Resolution 1734
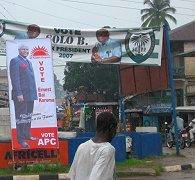
- Election posters in Sierra Leone
- Date: 22 December 2006
- Meeting no.: 5,608
- Code: S/RES/1734 (Document)
- Subject: The situation in Sierra Leone
- Voting summary: 15 voted for; None voted against; None abstained
- Result: Adopted

Security Council composition
- Permanent members: China; France; Russia; United Kingdom; United States
- Non-permanent members: Argentina; Rep. of the Congo; Denmark; Ghana; Greece; Japan; Peru; Qatar; Slovakia; Tanzania

United Nations Security Council Resolution 1734, adopted unanimously on December 22, 2006, after recalling all previous resolutions on the situation in Sierra Leone, including resolutions 1620 (2005) and 1688 (2006), the Council renewed the mandate of the United Nations Integrated Office in Sierra Leone (UNIOSIL) until December 31, 2007.

== Resolution ==
=== Observations ===
In the preamble of Resolution 1734, the Council paid tribute to UNIOSIL for its contribution towards post-conflict Sierra Leone. The Secretary-General Kofi Annan and President Ahmad Tejan Kabbah had recommended that the peacekeeping mission's mandate be extended until the end of 2007 so that preparations for general elections could take place. Council members considered the elections to be a "major milestone" in the history of the country.

Meanwhile, the resolution welcomed progress in reform of the army and police of Sierra Leone, and also welcomed the work of the Special Court for Sierra Leone. States in the Mano River Union were urged to continue dialogue to build peace and security in the region.

=== Acts ===
The resolution extended UNIOSIL's mandate until the end of December 2007, with a temporary increase of 15 additional police and military observers from January 1 to October 31, 2007 in order to provide electoral support.

All parties in Sierra Leone were asked to stand behind the democratic process. The Sierra Leonean government, UNIOSIL and others were called upon to do more to promote good governance, including measures to tackle corruption, improve accountability, strengthen the private sector and promote human rights.

The government–which was reminded of its responsibility to promote peacebuilding, security and development–was requested to continue co-operation with the Peacebuilding Commission, provide support for electoral institutions and implement the recommendations of the Truth and Reconciliation Commission.

Finally, the Secretary-General was required to keep the Council regularly informed on developments in Sierra Leone.

== See also ==
- List of United Nations Security Council Resolutions 1701 to 1800 (2006–2008)
- Sierra Leone Civil War
