= United Nations Security Council Resolution 1537 =

UN Security Council Resolution 1537
- Sierra Leone within the African Union
- Date: 30 March 2004
- Meeting no.: 4,938
- Code: S/RES/1537 (Document)
- Subject: The situation in Sierra Leone
- Voting summary: 15 voted for; None voted against; None abstained
- Result: Adopted

Security Council composition
- Permanent members: China; France; Russia; United Kingdom; United States
- Non-permanent members: Algeria; Angola; Benin; Brazil; Chile; Germany; Pakistan; Philippines; Romania; Spain

United Nations Security Council resolution 1537, adopted unanimously on 30 March 2004, after recalling all previous resolutions on the situation in Sierra Leone, the council extended the mandate of the United Nations Mission in Sierra Leone (UNAMSIL) for six months until 30 September 2004 with a residual force remaining in the country until June 2005.

== Resolution ==
=== Observations ===
In the preamble of the resolution, the Security Council praised the efforts of the Economic Community of West African States (ECOWAS) to build peace in the subregion and to countries contributing towards UNAMSIL. It welcomed progress made towards benchmarks for the drawdown of UNAMSIL in accordance with resolutions 1436 (2002) and 1492 (2003). At the same time, the council noted that progress towards the benchmarks was fragile and there were concerns about security and the capabilities of the Sierra Leone Police.

The introduction also stressed the importance of the consolidation of state authority throughout Sierra Leone, including the diamond-producing and border areas. Furthermore, it was important that free and fair local elections were held in May 2004, according to the council. A Human Rights Commission was to be established following a report by the Truth and Reconciliation Commission. The council also noted the need for the Sierra Leonean government to assume responsibility for the country's national security as soon as possible, and the Secretary-General's conclusion that a small presence of the United Nations had to remain in Sierra Leone into 2005.

=== Acts ===
Extending UNAMSIL's mandate, the council welcomed the Secretary-General's adjustment of the drawdown timetable to ensure a more gradual military reduction. It urged the government of Sierra Leone to continue efforts to develop a sustainable police force, army, penal system and independent judiciary so that it could assume full responsibility from UNAMSIL at the end of its mandate. The council also urged the government to increase control and regulation of the diamond mining industry.

The resolution authorised a residual presence of UNAMSIL to remain in Sierra Leone until June 2005, while being reduced to 3,250 troops, 141 military observers and 80 United Nations police. Tasks for the remaining personnel would be arranged by 30 September 2004. Meanwhile, the Secretary-General was requested to report on the situation in Sierra Leone, the conflict in Liberia and on the work of the Special Court for Sierra Leone by 15 September 2004, particularly welcoming his intention to keep the human rights, humanitarian, security and political situation in Sierra Leone under review.

The Council appreciated the work of the Special Court but noted financial concerns, calling for countries to submit outstanding contributions. Finally, UNAMSIL was asked to share its expertise with the United Nations Mission in Liberia and United Nations Operation in Côte d'Ivoire, particularly with regard to the movements of weapons and combatants across borders.

== See also ==
- Ivorian Civil War
- List of United Nations Security Council Resolutions 1501 to 1600 (2003–2005)
- Second Liberian Civil War
- Sierra Leone Civil War
- Special Court for Sierra Leone
