= United Nations Security Council Resolution 1940 =

UN Security Council Resolution 1940
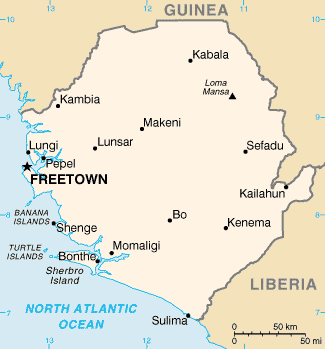
- Sierra Leone
- Date: 29 September 2010
- Meeting no.: 6,392
- Code: S/RES/1940 (Document)
- Subject: The situation in Sierra Leone
- Voting summary: 15 voted for; None voted against; None abstained
- Result: Adopted

Security Council composition
- Permanent members: China; France; Russia; United Kingdom; United States
- Non-permanent members: Austria; Bosnia–Herzegovina; Brazil; Gabon; Japan; Lebanon; Mexico; Nigeria; Turkey; Uganda

United Nations Security Council Resolution 1940, adopted unanimously on September 29, 2010, after recalling all previous resolutions on the situation in Sierra Leone, including resolutions 1132 (1997) and the 1171 (1998), the Council lifted an arms embargo and remaining sanctions against the country imposed in 1997.

The Security Council recalled that the measures would be terminated when the Sierra Leonean government had re-established control over its entire territory and non-governmental forces had been demobilised and disarmed. It also reaffirmed its commitment to support Sierra Leone post-conflict and commended the work of the United Nations Integrated Peacebuilding Office in Sierra Leone (UNIPSIL) in this regard. All states were urged to co-operate with the Special Court for Sierra Leone and Interpol in apprehending Johnny Paul Koroma and bringing him to justice, if found alive.

Acting under Chapter VII of the United Nations Charter, the sanctions were lifted and the Committee established by Resolution 1132 to monitor the sanctions was subsequently dissolved. On the same day, the mandate of UNIPSIL was extended until September 2011 in Resolution 1941 (2010).

== See also ==
- List of United Nations Security Council Resolutions 1901 to 2000 (2009–2011)
- Second Liberian Civil War
- Sierra Leone Civil War
- Special Court for Sierra Leone
