= United Nations Security Council Resolution 1688 =

UN Security Council Resolution 1688
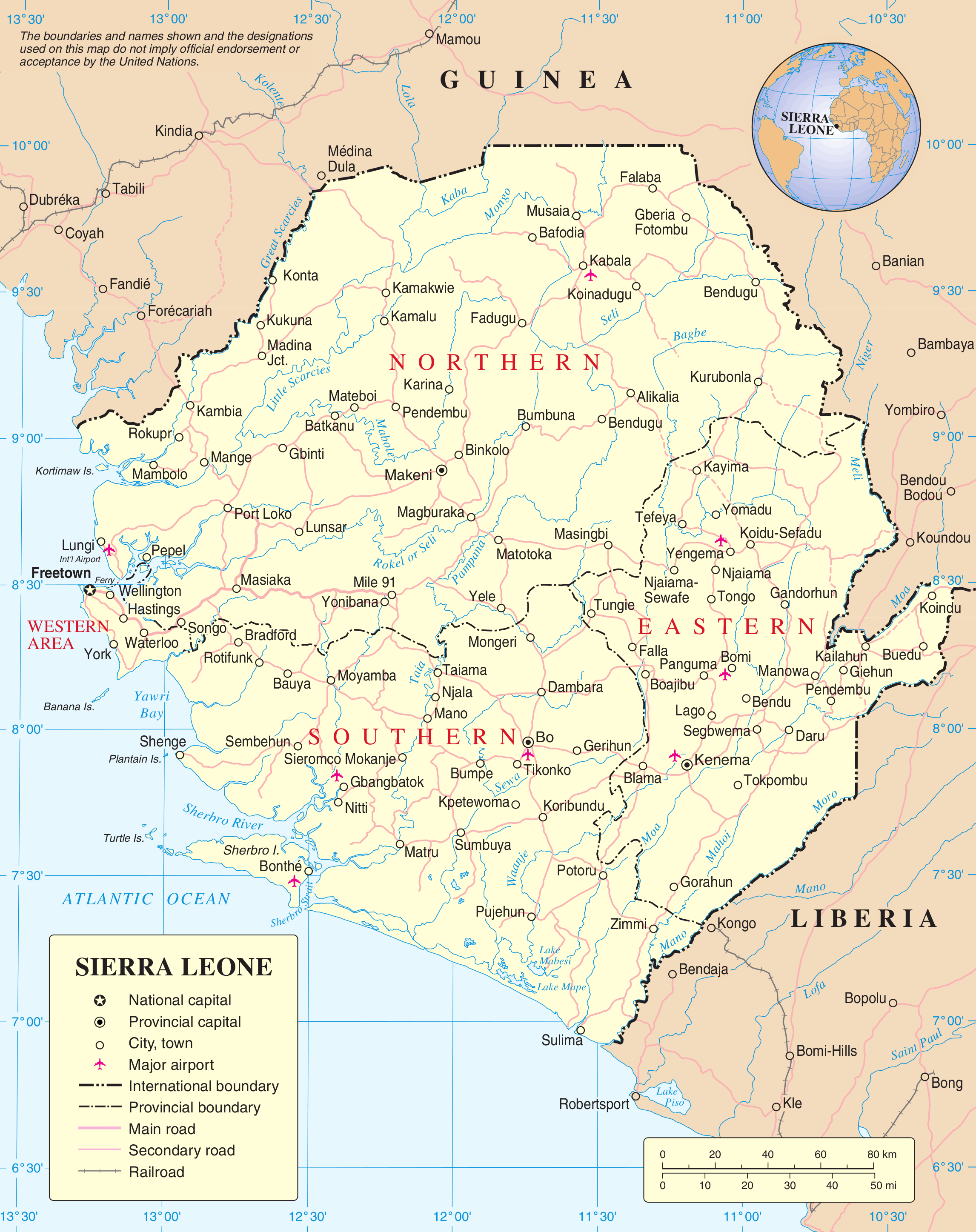
- Sierra Leone
- Date: 16 June 2006
- Meeting no.: 5,467
- Code: S/RES/1688 (Document)
- Subject: The situation in Sierra Leone
- Voting summary: 15 voted for; None voted against; None abstained
- Result: Adopted

Security Council composition
- Permanent members: China; France; Russia; United Kingdom; United States
- Non-permanent members: Argentina; Rep. of the Congo; Denmark; Ghana; Greece; Japan; Peru; Qatar; Slovakia; Tanzania

United Nations Security Council Resolution 1688, adopted unanimously on June 16, 2006, after recalling all previous resolutions on the situation in Liberia, Sierra Leone and West Africa, including resolutions 1470 (2003), 1508 (2003), 1537 (2004) and 1638 (2005), the Council approved the transfer of former Liberian President Charles Taylor to the Special Court for Sierra Leone which was moved to The Hague in the Netherlands, due to security concerns.

The Netherlands agreed to host the trial only if Charles Taylor was imprisoned in a third country.

== Resolution ==
=== Observations ===
In the preamble of the resolution, the Council recalled the establishment of the Special Court by Resolution 1315 (2000) and that it may meet away from its seat if necessary. Furthermore, the Council expressed its will to end impunity, establish the rule of law, promote human rights and maintain international peace and security. It also appreciated that Liberian President Ellen Johnson-Sirleaf and Nigerian President Olusegun Obasanjo had requested and facilitated the transfer of Charles Taylor to the Special Court, respectively.

Meanwhile, the Security Council recognised that proceedings at the Special Court would contribute to truth and reconciliation in Liberia and the subregion, and the rule of law in Sierra Leone. It noted that the trial could not take place in the Sierra Leonean capital of Freetown due to security concerns, nor at the International Criminal Tribunal for Rwanda as it was engaged with other tasks, and that no other tribunal existed in Africa. The resolution determined that the continued presence of Charles Taylor in West Africa constituted a threat to peace and security in the region.

=== Acts ===
Under Chapter VII of the United Nations Charter, the Council noted that a trial chamber would be established in the Netherlands to exercise its functions away from the seat of the Special Court. It welcomed the Dutch government's decision to host the trial and the International Criminal Court's intention to use its premises to detain and try Charles Taylor. In this context, co-operation from all states was required and for the Secretary-General Kofi Annan to assist in the arrangements.

Meanwhile, the Special Court was requested to make the proceedings accessible publicly through video link, as it was given exclusive jurisdiction over Charles Taylor during the detention and trial process. The Dutch government was to facilitate the trial by:

(a) allowing the detention and trial of Charles Taylor;
(b) facilitating the transport of Charles Taylor while in the Netherlands;
(c) enabling the appearance of witnesses, experts and others at the trial in the same way as at the International Criminal Tribunal for the former Yugoslavia.

The resolution exempted Charles Taylor from the provisions of Resolution 1521 (2003) for the purposes of travel within the Netherlands, and noted that costs were to be borne by the Special Court that was funded via contributions from states.

== See also ==
- List of United Nations Security Council Resolutions 1601 to 1700 (2005–2006)
- Second Liberian Civil War
- Sierra Leone Civil War
