= United Nations Security Council Resolution 1508 =

UN Security Council Resolution 1508
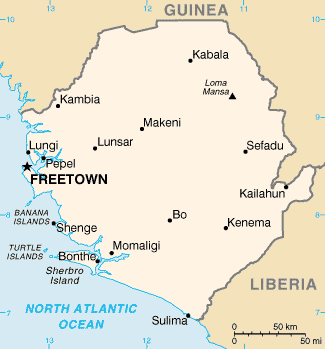
- Sierra Leone
- Date: 19 September 2003
- Meeting no.: 4,829
- Code: S/RES/1508 (Document)
- Subject: The situation in Sierra Leone
- Voting summary: 15 voted for; None voted against; None abstained
- Result: Adopted

Security Council composition
- Permanent members: China; France; Russia; United Kingdom; United States
- Non-permanent members: Angola; Bulgaria; Chile; Cameroon; Germany; Guinea; Mexico; Pakistan; Spain; Syria

United Nations Security Council resolution 1508, adopted unanimously on 19 September 2003, after recalling all previous resolutions on the situation in Sierra Leone, the Council extended the mandate of the United Nations Mission in Sierra Leone (UNAMSIL) for six months until 31 March 2004.

The resolution stated that stability in Sierra Leone would depend on the situation in neighbouring Liberia. On the same day, the Security Council adopted Resolution 1509 (2003) establishing the United Nations Mission in Liberia.

== Resolution ==
=== Observations ===
The Security Council welcomed the stabilising security situation in Sierra Leone and noted that its stability would depend on peace in the region, particularly in Liberia which was experiencing its second civil war. It stressed the importance of establishing authority throughout Sierra Leone, including the diamond fields in addition to the reintegration of ex-combatants, the return of refugees and internally displaced persons and respect for human rights and the rule of law.

=== Acts ===
Extending UNAMSIL's mandate for an additional six months, the Council thanked countries contributing to the force and UNAMSIL for adjustments to its size, composition and deployment in accordance with resolutions 1436 (2002) and 1492 (2003).

The resolution stressed that the development of administrative capabilities of the Sierra Leonean government was essential to long-term peace. Additionally, the government was urged to increase control of diamond mining. Meanwhile, the Council expressed concern at the serious financial situation of the Special Court for Sierra Leone and countries were asked to contribute generously to both the Court and Truth and Reconciliation Commission. The presidents of the Mano River Union to resume dialogue and commitments aimed at strengthening regional peace and security.

The Council welcomed the deployment of forces from the Economic Community of West African States (ECOWAS) to Liberia, supported by UNAMSIL. It demanded that armed groups in Liberia end incursions into Sierra Leone, urging the Sierra Leone Armed Forces and UNAMSIL to patrol the border. Finally, the Secretary-General was to keep the situation in Sierra Leone under review.

== See also ==
- List of United Nations Security Council Resolutions 1501 to 1600 (2003–2005)
- Second Liberian Civil War
- Sierra Leone Civil War
- Special Court for Sierra Leone
