= Open Government Initiative (Sierra Leone) =

The Open Government Initiative is a department of the Government of Sierra Leone whose aim is to ensure transparency, accountability and civic participation in governance processes.
