= United Nations Security Council Resolution 1829 =

UN Security Council Resolution 1829
- Date: 4 August 2008
- Meeting no.: 5,948
- Code: S/RES/1829 (Document)
- Subject: The situation in Sierra Leone
- Voting summary: 15 voted for; None voted against; None abstained
- Result: Adopted

Security Council composition
- Permanent members: China; France; Russia; United Kingdom; United States
- Non-permanent members: Burkina Faso; Belgium; Costa Rica; Croatia; Indonesia; Italy; Libya; Panama; South Africa; Vietnam

United Nations Security Council Resolution 1829 was unanimously adopted on 4 August 2008.

== Resolution ==
The Security Council today requested the Secretary-General to establish a Peacebuilding Office in Sierra Leone for a period of 12 months beginning on 1 October 2008, following the completion of the mandate of the United Nations Integrated Office in Sierra Leone (UNIOSIL) on 30 September.

As requested by the Council in resolution 1829 (2008), which it adopted unanimously today, the new body would be formally known as the United Nations Integrated Peacebuilding Office in Sierra Leone (UNIPSIL)) and would focus on, and support Government efforts in, identifying and resolving tensions and threats of potential conflict; monitoring and promoting human rights, democratic institutions and the rule of law; consolidating good governance reforms; and supporting efforts towards decentralization, review of the 1991 Constitution and enactment of relevant legislation.

The Council was acting on recommendations contained in the Secretary-General’s April report (document S/2008/281), which states that the sustained commitment of the United Nations will continue to be required in Sierra Leone following the withdrawal of UNIOSIL in September. The establishment of a United Nations peacebuilding office to holistically address the political, economic and peacebuilding challenges facing the country will be a significant channel of continuing international support for peace consolidation.

By the terms of the resolution adopted today, the Council encouraged close coordination with the Peacebuilding Commission and specified the need to support implementation of the Peacebuilding Cooperation Framework and projects supported through the Peacebuilding Fund.

== See also ==
- List of United Nations Security Council Resolutions 1801 to 1900 (2008–2009)
