= Brookfields =

Neighbourhood in Freetown, Sierra Leone

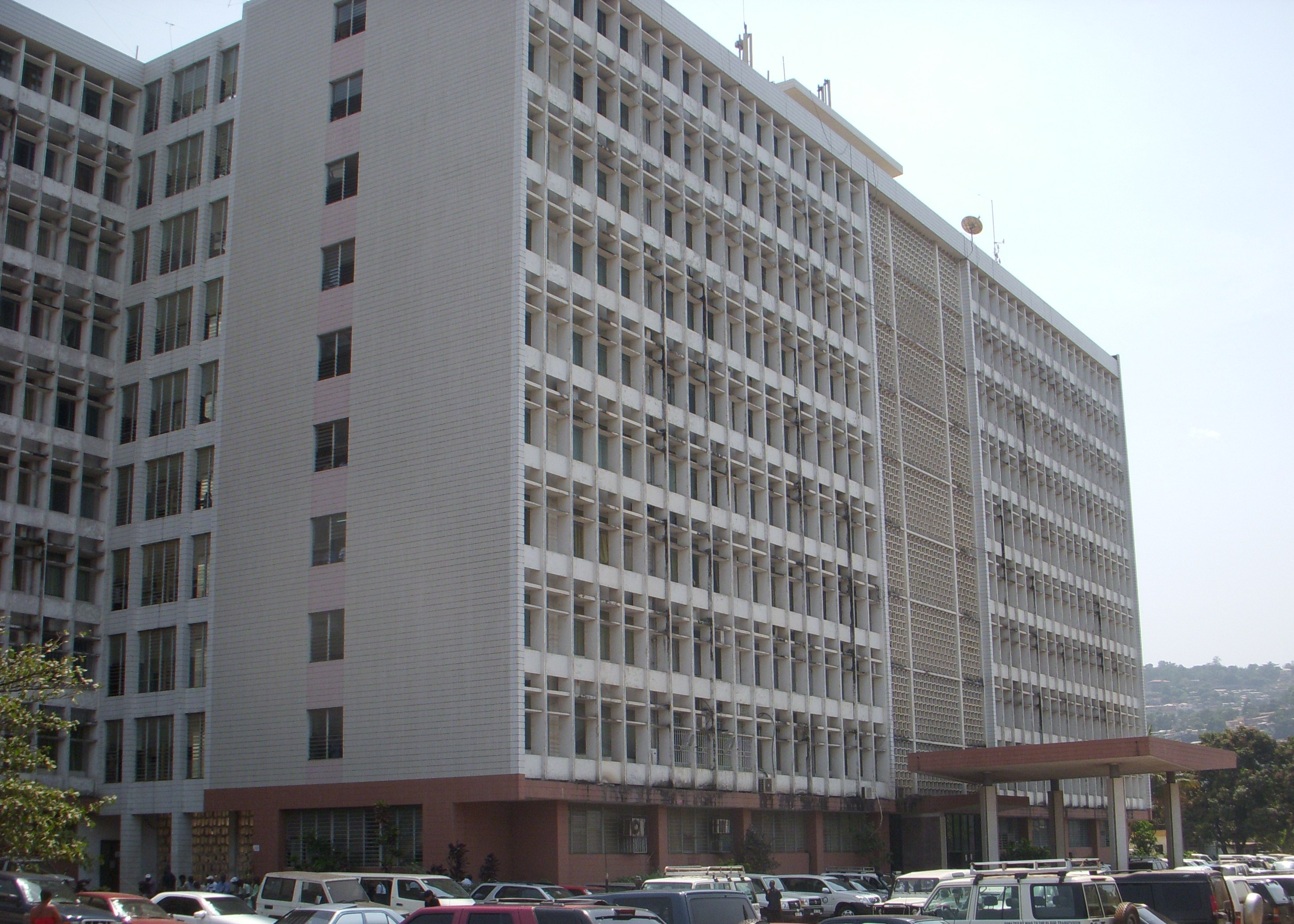
Youyi Building, Brookfields, where several government Ministry offices are located

Brookfields is a neighbourhood in Freetown, Sierra Leone.

== History ==
During the colonial period, newly arriving British administrators and other staff stayed in an area called the "Transit Camp" before more long-term accommodation could be arranged. After independence, this are was converted into the Brookfields Hotel.

== Youyi Building ==
The Youyi Building houses several government ministries:

- 3rd floor: Ministry of Agriculture, Forestry and Food Security
- 4th floor: Ministry of Lands, Country Planning, & the Environment
- 5th floor: Ministry of Mineral Resources
- 6th floor: Ministry of Health and Sanitation
- 7th floor Ministry of Fisheries & Marine Resources
- 8th floor Ministry of Information and Communication
