= .sl =

Internet country code top-level domain for Sierra Leone

- Introduced: 9 May 1997
- TLD type: Country code top-level domain
- Status: Active
- Registry: AFCOM SL
- Sponsor: Sierratel
- Intended use: Entities connected with Sierra Leone
- Actual use: Not very much used
- Registration restrictions: Registry reserves the right to screen and reject applications
- Structure: Registrations permitted at second level
- Dispute policies: UDRP
- Registry website: www.nic.sl

.sl is the Internet country code top-level domain (ccTLD) for Sierra Leone.

== Request for use by Somaliland ==
In 2020, the Minister of Telecommunication and Technology of the unrecognized state of Somaliland asked Sierra Leone's Ministry of Information and Communication if they would be willing to share the use of the ccTLD with Somaliland. It is not clear if any response was received.

== Second-level domains ==
- .sl: General (may be registered by anyone)
- .com.sl: Commercial entities, e.g. companies
- .net.sl: Commercial entities with relation to networking (such as Internet service providers, cable companies etc.)
- .org.sl: Charities and non-profit organisations
- .edu.sl: Educational institutions registered in Sierra Leone
- .gov.sl: State and local government entities (requires authorization letter from the local Minister of Information Office)
