= EASL =

EASL may refer to:

- East Asia Super League, an international basketball league in East Asia
- Epilepsy Association of Sierra Leone, a disability organization based in Sierra Leone
- European Association for the Study of the Liver, a medical organization based in Switzerland
