= United Nations Security Council Resolution 1620 =

UN Security Council Resolution 1620
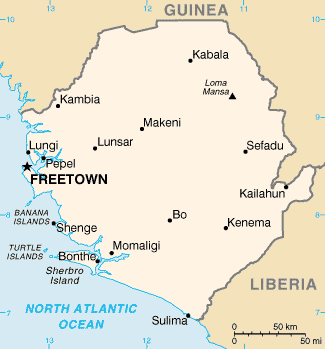
- Sierra Leone
- Date: 31 August 2005
- Meeting no.: 5,254
- Code: S/RES/1620 (Document)
- Subject: The situation in Sierra Leone
- Voting summary: 15 voted for; None voted against; None abstained
- Result: Adopted

Security Council composition
- Permanent members: China; France; Russia; United Kingdom; United States
- Non-permanent members: Algeria; Argentina; Benin; Brazil; Denmark; Greece; Japan; Philippines; Romania; Tanzania

United Nations Security Council resolution 1620, adopted unanimously on 31 August 2005, after recalling all previous resolutions on the situation in Sierra Leone, the council established the United Nations Integrated Office in Sierra Leone (UNIOSIL) for an initial period of twelve months beginning on 1 January 2006, to replace the United Nations Mission in Sierra Leone (UNAMSIL).

== Resolution ==
=== Observations ===
In the preamble of the resolution, the council began by welcoming the recommendation of the Secretary-General Kofi Annan to establish an integrated office as a follow-on to UNAMSIL from the end of 2005. It emphasised the importance of a smooth transition between UNAMSIL and the integrated office, and of continued support from the international community for the long-term development of Sierra Leone. Meanwhile, the work of the Special Court for Sierra Leone and the Truth and Reconciliation Commission was praised.

=== Acts ===
The security council established UNIOSIL with a mandate to assist the Sierra Leonean government in capacity building, human rights, the electoral process, enhancing good governance, strengthening the rule of law, promoting peace and dialogue, strengthening the security sector and the well-being of the population. The integrated office would also assist with the security situation, co-ordinate with other United Nations missions in West Africa and with the Special Court. Meanwhile, the government was reminded that it had to consolidate peace and security in the country.

The resolution emphasised the importance of co-ordination between the integrated office and other international organisations and agencies. UNIOSOL would be headed by an executive representative of the secretary-general, while Kofi Annan was asked to continue planning for the protection of the special court.

== See also ==
- List of United Nations Security Council Resolutions 1601 to 1700 (2005–2006)
- Sierra Leone Civil War
