= Mining in Sierra Leone =

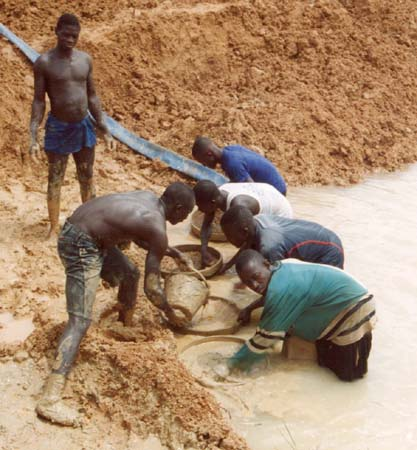
Diamond miners in Kono District

The mining industry of Sierra Leone accounted for 5.3 percent of the country's GDP in 2023 and minerals made up 79 percent of total export revenue with diamonds accounting for 46 percent of export revenue in 2008. The main minerals mined in Sierra Leone are diamonds, rutile, bauxite, gold, iron and limonite.

Mining in Sierra Leone has been seen as one of the key factors for instability in the country and one of the reasons for the country's recent civil war. Traditionally, benefits from diamond mining have ended up with private companies and corrupt officials rather than the country's government and people.

The Ministry of Mineral Resources is responsible for the management of the country's minerals sector and the Mines and Minerals Act 2009. Sierra Leone joined the Extraction Industries Transparency Initiative (EITI) in 2008. GoSL publishes data on licenses and payments by mining companies on their Online Repository established by Revenue Development Foundation, the repository was launched in January 2012.

== History ==
Organized mining began in the 1920s with bauxite first being recorded in 1920 along the Falaba to Waia road. Diamonds were found in the early 1930s, from 1934 to 1956 the Sierra Leone Selection Trust (SLST) held the monopoly for mining, prospecting for and marketing diamonds throughout Sierra Leone. The Consolidated African Selection Trust Ltd (CAST), which owned mining operation around West Africa, provided the initial capital for the SLST.

The monopoly was originally given for 99 years but in 1955 the SLST gave up rights to alluvial deposits outside its lease area. This allowed artisan and small scale mining of alluvial deposits, and by 1965 there had been a large movement from agricultural work to working these deposits. In 1970 a joint SLST and government organization was formed called the National Diamond Mining Corporation (NDMC).

Before the start of the Civil War in 1991, 250,000 people made a living in the mining and quarrying sector with direct and indirect employment accounting for 14% of the country's total labour force. The mineral wealth of Sierra Leone, especially in diamonds, became a key factor in its instability and the outbreak of civil war.

=== Resource curse ===
Despite being among the top-ten diamond-producing nations, the mining sector faces many challenges, including weak laws and smuggling issues. Sierra Leone is losing large revenue that could have been earned from taxes and licensing agreements. Those revenues could be reinvested for example in the healthcare sector to help those people whose health is affected by mining operations.

Research suggests that 50% of Sierra Leone’s diamonds were smuggled annually. Sierra Leone’s mining performance is extremely poor as compared to Botswana, where mining contributes approximately 38% to their GDP.

== Rutile ==
Sierra Leone is ranked as one of the top five producers of rutile, a titanium ore, used in paint pigment and welding rod coatings. The government issued leases for mining rutile are held by Sierra Rutile Limited which is owned by Titanium Resources Group which is owned by European and U.S investors. These leases cover 580 km^{2} of land where there are 19 identified deposits of rutile. In 2009 the Government of Sierra Leone received Le 1,854 million in royalties from rutile mining.

In 2009 production decreased by 19.07 percent to 63,860 tons, and exports were worth US$ 35,920,300.

On 8 December 2016, Sierra Rutile Limited, Sierra Leone's largest rutile producer, was acquired by Australian mineral sands miner Iluka Resources. In 2022, Iluka shareholders voted in favor of de-merging Sierra Rutile. By the end of the year, Sierra Rutile (ASX SRX) and Iluka began trading independently.

== Gold ==
Gold mining in Sierra Leone consisted of small scale operation exploiting alluvial deposits. After the end of the Sierra Leone Civil War exploration of gold grew and by 2013 to 2015 new modern mines are expected to be in production. In 2010 Cluff Gold, a British company, found gold deposits in the rocks of the southern Kangari hills and is planning to build a mechanised mine to extract it.

In 2009 production levels of gold fell by 17.71 percent to 5060 Troy Ounces (157 kg) from 6150 Troy Ounces (191 kg) in 2008. This was due to a drop in mining activity in the second half of the year and was despite a rise in the price of gold on the global market. The drop may also have been due to increased smuggling as the Government of Sierra Leone had raised the duty to higher than the neighboring countries. The increase in the value of gold meant gold exports were worth 15.73 percent more at US$4,764,000 in 2009 compared to US$4,116,400 in 2008.

== Diamonds ==
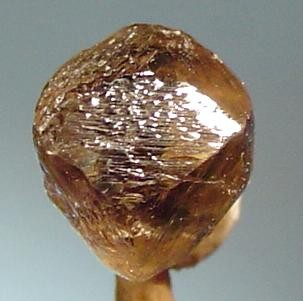
1.3 carat, brown, octahedral diamond crystal from Sierra Leone

=== Overview ===
Diamonds are found in about a quarter of Sierra Leone in the south-east and east of the country, with the diamond fields covering 7,700 square miles. The main production areas are concentrated around the drainage areas of rivers in the Kono, Kenema and Bo Districts. In the Kono, Kenema, Bo and Pujehun Districts there are 1,700 artisanal mining licenses in operation.

In 2009 the government recorded exports of 400,480 carats (80,096 g) of diamonds; this included 143,620 carats (28,724 g) of industrial diamonds and 256,860 (51,372 g) of gem diamonds. This was an increase of 7.86 percent on the previous year which was a result of legislative changes, in the form of a new mining law, to enable fees and royalties to be collected more effectively and an increase in the amount of diamond mining. Diamond exports were worth US$78,373,900 in 2009, accounting for 59 percent of the country's exports. The drop in the value of diamonds on the world market meant that the value of diamond exports decreased by 20.68 percent in 2009 compared to 2008.

The largest diamond found in Sierra Leone, and the third largest diamond in the world, was a 969.8-carat (194 g) rough diamond. It was found in 1972 and named the An-al of Sierra Leone.

Sierra Leone should have been one of the world’s richest countries, being blessed with resources, including gold and diamonds. However, it remains one of the world’s poorest countries, ranking 203 out of 206 countries by World Development Report. Revenue from mining in Sierra Leone has not been redistributed to benefit the larger population. The mining industry contributed 4.5% towards its gross domestic product (GDP) in 2007. Economic development is low due to poor management of resources and unrealized potential revenue.

=== Historical context ===
Diamonds were first discovered in Sierra Leone in the 1930s by British colonialists, with significant mining efforts beginning in 1935. Sierra Leonean diamonds are renowned for their high quality, and retained a high value on the market. The colonial government granted exclusive mining rights to the Sierra Leone Selection Trust (SLST) with legislation “geared towards smooth exploitation of diamonds to fulfil interests.” The De Beers Diamond Consortium, however, quickly took control of the mining trade shortly after and established offices in Freetown, as well as in mining districts around the country (most notable among these was the Kono District). Under colonial rule, mining efforts were largely controlled and overseen by De Beers and the British government, and profits were generally contained to British and European stakeholders. Growth of the mining industry contributed to the development of mining communities in bettering employment, infrastructure, and social services, though the communities saw little material gains in their own lives.

Despite the control that De Beers had over the industry at the time, many other actors, both internal and external, realized they could accrue a great deal of profits through illicit mining and smuggling of diamonds out of the country. Very quickly, the illegal diamond trade expanded, and a strong pipeline was established between Sierra Leone and Liberia as traders – many of whom were Lebanese – carried diamonds across the border. These illicit mining efforts let local communities realize more of the gains from trading diamonds. In an effort to gain greater control over the diamond industry, the Sierra Leonean government enacted legislation in 1956 that allowed for legal marketing of diamond production within the nation. In doing so, the government granted a monopoly to the De Beers Group, making it a Central Selling Organization (CSO). However, this only furthered the illicit mining industry, as legitimate diamond exports continued to decline throughout the next several decades.

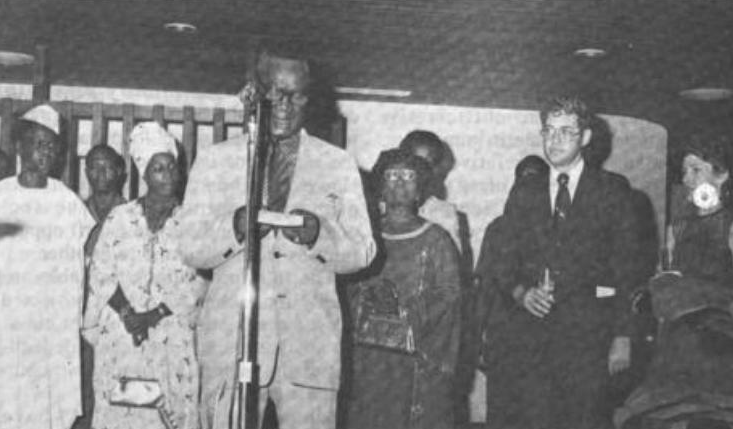
Siaka Stevens delivering speech at the US Embassy in celebration of US Independence Day (1976)

Seven years after gaining independence, Siaka Stevens was elected Prime Minister of Sierra Leone in 1968. He is regarded as the first person to officially make diamond mining and trading a tool of political power, and encouraged illicit mining under his rule. He nationalized the diamond mines, including those run by De Beers, and created the National Diamond Mining Company (NDMC). The NDMC gave Stevens and his right-hand man, Jamil Mohammed, unprecedented wealth and power through profits gained in the mining industry. Centralization of the mines and subsequent profits through the 1970s and 1980s drove out much of the corporate mining that was once dominant in Sierra Leone. It is reported that, under Stevens, legitimate diamond exports dropped from more than two million carats in 1980 to 48,000 carats in 1988.

As Siaka Stevens’s rule came to its end in 1984, De Beers removed itself from Sierra Leone and sold its remaining shares to the Precious Metals Mining Company which was controlled by Jamil Mohammed. The corruption within the government continued as Stevens’s successor as Prime Minister, Joseph Momoh, took office. Illicit diamond trading prospered and Mohammed, as well as other Lebanese traders who were also tied to the mining efforts, continued receiving funds through the trade in Sierra Leone. In 1987, though, Mohammed was exiled following a failed coup attempt and connections with Lebanese traders faded into the 1990s. This allowed for an influx of Israeli investors and stakeholders to enter the diamond trade in Sierra Leone who had ties with Antwerp, the center of the global diamond market. The HRD, a Belgian group that structures formal trading agreements of diamonds and monitors diamond trading, retained lackluster standards that allowed traders to smuggle diamonds out of Sierra Leone and sell them to European buyers. The HRD listed a diamond’s country of origin to only be that which it is exported from, which in this case was often Liberia, allowing diamonds to continue being funneled out of the country through its neighboring nation.

=== The role of diamond mining in the Civil War ===
The history of corruption and open government ties to the illegal diamond trade was not well received among the populace, leading to the creation of the Revolutionary United Front (RUF) and eventually the advent of the Sierra Leone Civil War. This group, made up of soldiers from Sierra Leone and Liberia, led a coup attempt in 1991, beginning a long civil war within the nation which lasted until 2002. Knowing that control of the mines would allow the RUF to fund their revolutionary efforts, much of the fighting was contained in and around the diamond districts. As the civil war continued, the RUF furthered their consolidation of these mines, using the sales of “conflict diamonds” to buy arms and fuel their brutal tactics of warfare.

In attempts to limit the RUF’s power and access to funds from diamond sales, the United Nations sent peacekeeping forces into Sierra Leone and imposed a worldwide embargo on diamonds exported from Sierra Leone. This included barring the private diamond industry from buying diamonds which were not certified by the Government of Sierra Leone.

The impacts of the civil war were disastrous for Sierra Leone, leaving tens of thousands dead and towns destroyed. The RUF has been condemned for various war crimes and human rights abuses, including mass killings, widespread rape, and enlisting of underage soldiers. Moreover, the blood diamond industry continued to thrive, despite the efforts of the UN, with little to none of the profits going back into development of the nation itself.

=== De Beers and the diamond trade in the 2000s ===
Though De Beers removed itself from Sierra Leone in a formal capacity in 1985, it continues to be involved with the diamond trade through this day. While it outwardly condemned the sale of conflict diamonds throughout the civil war, it received significant criticism in the early 2000s for allegedly buying diamonds from insurgent groups — through outside dealers — to retain its majority share of the diamond market. In doing so, De Beers was able to continue setting the market price and hold its dominant position in the industry. In following years, De Beers made several commitments to only buying diamonds when its origin has been officially certified.

Recently, De Beers has taken a more direct approach to working with Sierra Leone in an effort to create a market for ethically-sourced and artisanal diamonds. Its new program, called GemFair, was created alongside the Diamond Development Initiative and centers around a digital monitoring system that traces the origin and history of diamonds. Starting out as a pilot program in 2018, it included 14 mining sites in the Kono district. GemFair also includes a miner training program that trains workers on fair labor practices and safer working standards. As of 2021, the program has grown to include 160 members.

=== Diamond mining today ===
The creation of the Kimberley Process Certification Scheme in 2003 strove to eradicate the use and trade of conflict diamonds. The Kimberley Process has since been instrumental in sustaining a more robust form of governance over the diamond mining industry both in Sierra Leone, as well as around Africa.

Sierra Leone also maintains a robust legal diamond industry, including both public and private actors. Recently, significant deposits of diamonds, bauxite, iron ore, and gold have been discovered in Sierra Leone which has the potential to bring about significant growth to the economically struggling nation. The current president of Sierra Leone, Julius Maada Bio, has spoken publicly about his hope that these profits foster robust economic development throughout the country. He announced plans to work with the World Bank and state-run mining agencies to improve extraction processes and increase transparency within the institutions. In an address to the UK House of Lords, President Bio emphasized his desire to focus on public investments, particularly those in education. Rather than focusing solely on mining, he has expressed a desire to ensure profits are used effectively and equitably around the nation.

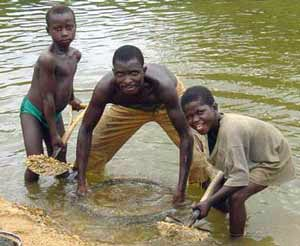
Child Miners in Sierra Leone

Though the government has expressed this sentiment, there are still ample issues within the mining sector in Sierra Leone. In December 2022, Amnesty International released a report outlining the human rights abuses which continue in the diamond mining sector in Sierra Leone. Specifically, it focuses on the practices of Meya Mining in the Kono district, finding the impacts of mining to have led to unsafe water, “dangers to communities living in the vicinity of the mine, and other violations of the socio-economic rights of local people.”

Further, international actors maintain a strong presence in the mining space throughout the country. Israeli-owned BSG Resources has evicted communities from their homes, polluted local water sources, and worked with the government to suppress protests. Workers, particularly those in the Kono District, earn $2–3 per day while working more than ten hours. Evidently, the problems of worker exploitation and foreign intervention have yet to disappear from Sierra Leone.

Despite the illegality of diamond smuggling under the Kimberley Process, the illicit diamond trade persists to this day. Hundreds of millions of dollars continue to be made through the illegal sales of diamonds, while Sierra Leone continues to face issues of lacking infrastructure and slow development. Workers continue to be exploited in the industry, and make less than a fraction of what they mine. While eyes are turned to the government to remedy these issues, widespread corruption halts progress from ensuing, with Transparency International rating them 110/180 on their corruption index.

== Bauxite ==
Sierra Leone's production of bauxite, an aluminium ore, is around one percent of the total global production. Deposits occur between Moyamba and Mano, on the Freetown Peninsular, at Krim-Kpaka in the Pujehun District, southern Sierra Leone; in north on the road from Falaba to Waia, at Kamakwie and Makumre.

Sierra Minerals Holdings is the only company mining bauxite in the country, and the second largest employer in the mining industry. It runs the Sieromco Bauxite Mine as well as holding the mining lease to 321.7 km2. In 2009 production of bauxite fell by 22.17 percent to 742,820 tons. This was due to Sierra Minerals ceasing production from June to September 2009 as a response to falling global demand for aluminum, which is produced from bauxite.

== Cultural references ==
The mining industry in Sierra Leone is the central focus of Kanye West's 2005 single "Diamonds from Sierra Leone". West speaks about the poor working conditions of the miners in Sierra Leone and the effect of the first world’s luxurious and expensive lifestyles on the third world mining industries in Africa, specifically the expensive diamonds exported from Sierra Leone. Kanye emphasizes the illegal diamond trade in Sierra Leone as a leading factor resulting in a gruesome civil war. The song hit top 50 on the US Billboard Top 100 in 2005 and received high praise.

== Governance ==
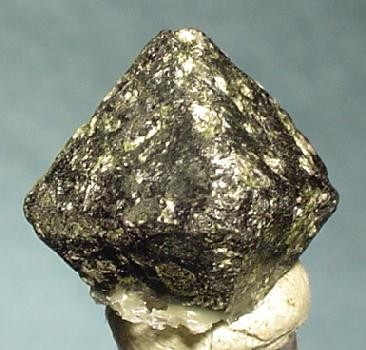
Chromite from Sierra Leone.

=== Institutions ===
Inefficiency and corruption of Sierra Leone’s institutions are impeding its economic growth. Absence of well-established institutions is the result of the destructive civil war which ended only in 2002. World Bank’s assistance brought reforms but also allowed local government to become lax. The Ministry of Mineral Resources (Sierra Leone)(MMR) administers the regulations and property rights of the Mines and Minerals Act (Sierra Leone) in 2009. However, licences made by mining companies were only published in 2011.

This reflects inefficiency in establishing a legal framework due to time-lag. It is also questionable whether there are proper corruption-checking mechanisms. Although the Sierra Leone Anti-corruption Commission (ACC) investigates corruption cases, critics have that noted it could merely be a political tool to quieten the government’s political opponents. However, the ACC objects to this and claims it is impartial. Pervasive corruption and unstable political environment stymie Sierra Leone’s economic growth and decrease investors’ confidence in Sierra Leone’s business and political climate.

=== Mining industry and other economic sectors ===
Policies regarding well-management of mining industry should be done alongside a broader focus for the economy’s development, and greater efforts should be done to expand the manufacturing and service sector, which currently only contribute 12% to the GDP. Sierra Leone produces raw diamonds but gem-quality diamonds are manufactured in developed countries like Belgium. For example, the government of Sierra Leone can provide greater tax incentives for investors to conduct businesses and invest in Sierra Leone, to facilitate the transfer of technology and skills to the native workers. One recent example is the Gemstone School Sierra Leone, which was established as an institution to improve diamond polishing, cutting and jewelry-manufacturing skills to boost job-training and employment opportunities locally and to attract overseas investors.

More efforts from the government and Multi-National Corporations can hence be done in the future to build more diamond-processing facilities and plants in Sierra Leone to boost the diamond mining industry.
