= United Nations Security Council Resolution 1638 =

UN Security Council Resolution 1638
- News on the trial of Charles Taylor in Monrovia
- Date: 11 November 2005
- Meeting no.: 5,304
- Code: S/RES/1638 (Document)
- Subject: The situation in Liberia
- Voting summary: 15 voted for; None voted against; None abstained
- Result: Adopted

Security Council composition
- Permanent members: China; France; Russia; United Kingdom; United States
- Non-permanent members: Algeria; Argentina; Benin; Brazil; Denmark; Greece; Japan; Philippines; Romania; Tanzania

United Nations Security Council resolution 1638, adopted unanimously on 11 November 2005, after recalling all previous resolutions on the situation in Liberia, Sierra Leone and West Africa, the Council included the apprehension, detention and transfer to the Special Court for Sierra Leone of former Liberian President Charles Taylor in the mandate of the United Nations Mission in Liberia (UNMIL).

Russian ambassador Andrey Denisov said the resolution would send a "strong signal" to Charles Taylor that he was to be arrested and stand trial.

== Resolution ==
=== Observations ===
The council began by expressing appreciation to Nigeria and its president, Olusegun Obasanjo, for efforts to restore peace and stability in Liberia and West Africa. It acknowledged that the country had acted with international backing when it gave refuge to Charles Taylor temporarily. At the same time, the council determined that Taylor's return to Liberia would threaten the stability of the country and that he remained under the indictment of the special court. Nigeria had refused to hand over Charles Taylor as it would contravene the terms of the deal under which he stepped down.

=== Acts ===
The resolution, enacted under Chapter VII of the United Nations Charter, allowed for UNMIL to apprehend and detain Charles Taylor in the event he returned to Liberia, and to facilitate his transfer to the special court for Sierra Leone.

== See also ==
- Liberian general election, 2005
- List of United Nations Security Council Resolutions 1601 to 1700 (2005–2006)
- Sierra Leone Civil War
- United Nations Integrated Office in Sierra Leone
