= United Nations Security Council Resolution 1886 =

UN Security Council Resolution 1886
- Date: 15 September 2009
- Meeting no.: 6,189
- Code: S/RES/1886 (Document)
- Subject: The situation in Sierra Leone
- Voting summary: 15 voted for; None voted against; None abstained
- Result: Adopted

Security Council composition
- Permanent members: China; France; Russia; United Kingdom; United States
- Non-permanent members: Austria; Burkina Faso; Costa Rica; Croatia; Japan; Libya; Mexico; Turkey; Uganda; Vietnam

United Nations Security Council Resolution 1886 was unanimously adopted on 15 September 2009.

== Resolution ==
The Security Council decided this morning to extend the mandate of the United Nations Integrated Peacebuilding Office in Sierra Leone (UNIPSIL) for one year, until 30 September 2010.

By its unanimous adoption of resolution 1886 (2009), the Council also determined that UNIPSIL, which was created a year ago under resolution 1829 (2008), should focus its efforts on supporting the Government of Sierra Leone in the areas of constitutional reform and police force improvement, as well as helping it tackle corruption, illicit drug trafficking and organized crime.

The Council emphasized the importance of UNIPSIL’s assistance with youth unemployment, support in preparing for the 2012 elections, in conjunction with the Peacebuilding Fund and the Peacebuilding Commission, which selected Sierra Leone as one of the first two countries to receive assistance in recovering from conflict. In all those efforts, the Council stressed that the Office should work within the Joint Vision of the United Nations country team.

Through the resolution, the Council called on the Secretary-General to develop a series of benchmarks towards the goal of a transition from UNIPSIL to a programme directed by the country team itself. It requested two progress reports from the Secretary-General next year, down from the quarterly reports of the previous year.

== See also ==
- List of United Nations Security Council Resolutions 1801 to 1900 (2008–2009)
