= Ministry of Mines and Mineral Resources =

Government ministry of Sierra Leone

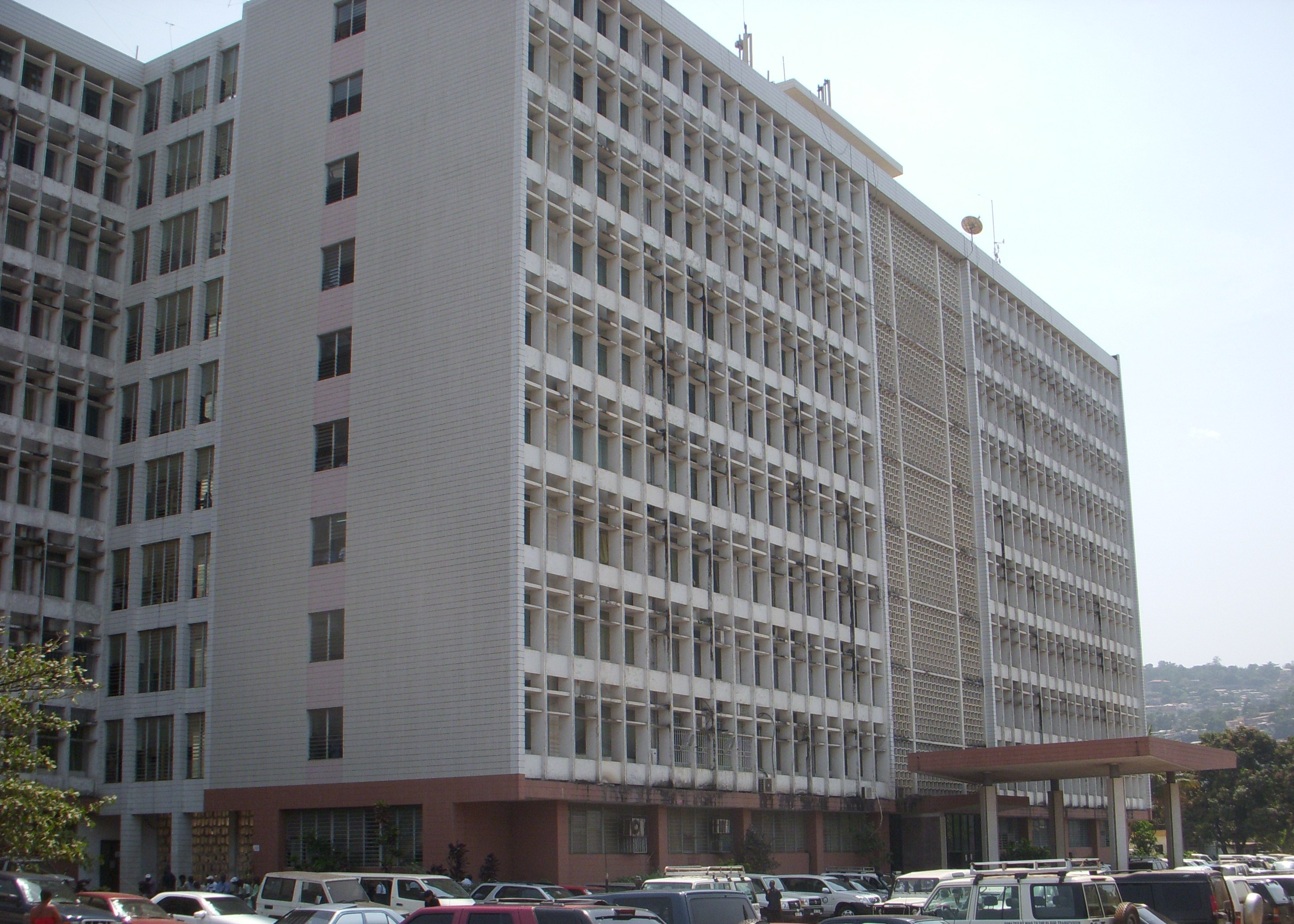
Youyi Building, Freetown

The Ministry of Mineral Resources (MMR) Sierra Leone is located on the 5th Floor Youyi Building, Brookfields, Freetown, Sierra Leone. Further to this the MMR Geological Surveys Department can be found at the New England estate, also in Freetown. The Ministry supports a network of regional offices in Makeni, Bo, Kenema and Kono, each headed by a Government Mines Engineer.

== Scope of Activities ==
The Ministry of Mineral Resources (MMR) in Sierra Leone is responsible for the management of minerals in accordance with the Mines and Minerals Act 2009. Concessions for industrial mining (exploration and large-scale mining) is managed by the Mining Cadastre Office (MCO) in Freetown, while all artisanal mining licenses are managed by the MMR Regional Offices located in Bo, Kenema, Makeni and Kono.

MMR has since 2009 implemented the Mining Cadastre Administration System (MCAS), provided by the Revenue Development Foundation. In early 2011, MMR started to publish all licenses and corresponding payments made by mining companies in the GoSL Online Repository, which was formally launched and opened to the public 19 January 2012. Sierra Leone is a candidate country for the Extraction Industries Transparency Initiative (EITI), and has established the SLEITI secretariat under the President's Office.

In 2001, the government created a mining community development fund (DACDF), which returns a portion of diamond export taxes to diamond mining communities. The distribution of the funds is calculated based on the number of artisanal licenses issued in each district. The fund was created to raise local communities' stake in the legal diamond trade.

== Structure of the Ministry ==
The political head of the Ministry is the Minister of Mineral Resources, and by consequence the direct representative of The President, Ernest Bai Koroma. The Ministry is divided into three main sections:

- The Office of the Permanent Secretary (The Administration)
- Mines Division
- Geological Survey Division

The Office of the Permanent Secretary is responsible for coordination, monitoring and ensuring that policies emanating from Government are effectively implemented. This Professional wing of the Ministry consists of two divisions: (i) the Mines Division; and (ii) the Geological Survey Division. Additionally, most major decision making within the Ministry is action through the Minerals Advisory Board.

The Mines Division administers the provisions of the Mines and Minerals Act, 2009 and the regulations made under these Acts. These include the issue of all industrial mineral rights and the administration and supervision of all activities under these rights. This Division also issues Mining Licences to Artisanal miners though its network of Regional Offices, and administers the regulations on the mining and marketing of precious minerals through the Government Gold and Diamond Office (GGDO) produced under these licences.

The Geological Survey Division (GSD), undertakes the geological mapping of Sierra Leone, prospecting and exploration operations, the collection, compilation, publication and dissemination of data and information concerning the geology and mineral resources of the country. GSD's geological database includes 1:1,000,000 scale map of the whole country; 1:250,000 scale geological maps of northern Sierra Leone, and 1:50,000 scale geological maps of the Sula Mountains and Kangari Hills. Over the past 15 years the GSD has completed a number of modest geochemical and geological surveys.

The Government Gold and Diamond Office (GGDO), which came into existence in 1985 in pursuance of government policy to rationalize the foreign exchange regime in the country, is now the Gold and Diamond Division (GDD) within the National Revenue Authority (NRA). The functions of the GDD are: (i) the valuation of gold and diamonds for export; and (ii) the collection of export charges, taxes and royalties on behalf of the government. The GDD has become extremely important since the UN Security Council Resolution 1306 of July 2000 on conflict diamonds. It now handles the certification of all diamonds exported legally from Sierra Leone. For administrative purposes it falls under the National Revenue Authority but its technical function is co-ordinated by the Mines Division.

The Minerals Advisory Board was established under The Mines and Minerals Act to advise the Minister in the discharge of his statutory responsibilities under it and this, in effect, limits discretionary power. The Board is made up of fourteen (14) members including the Director of Mines as Secretary and the Director of Geological Survey as member. The local Chamber of Mines is very much represented on the Board with others from the industry and together, presents an informed voice of the industry in its deliberation. The Secretary to the Board is a senior member of the Ministry of Mineral Resources.

Composition of the Minerals Advisory Board:

- Chairman
- Director of Mines (Secretary of the Minerals Advisory Board)
- Director of Geological Survey
- Commissioner-General of National Revenue Authority
- Representative of Attorney-General and Minister of Justice
- Representative of the Ministry responsible for local government
- Representative of the Ministry responsible for the environment
- Permanent Secretary, Ministry of Mineral Resources
- Two persons with considerable qualifications and experience in the mining industry

== EITI Status ==
On 14 December 2010, the EITI Board concluded that Sierra Leone has made meaningful progress in implementing the EITI. The Board agreed that Sierra Leone would retain their status as a Candidate countries, subject to a clearly defined and agreed work plan for achieving Compliant status, including a schedule for the next EITI Validation. The first report was launched and published in March 2010. The SLEITI Validation Report was completed in August 2010.

Sierra Leone announced its intention to implement EITI in the mining sector in June 2006. A steering committee was established including industry, government and civil society and an official launch of the Sierra Leone EITI was held in June 2007. A workplan was agreed by the steering committee in February 2008. Sierra Leone was accepted as an EITI candidate country on 22 February 2008. Sierra Leone has until 9 September 2010 to submit a final Validation report to the EITI Board.

== See also ==
- Mining in Sierra Leone
- Tongo, Sierra Leone
- EITI
