= Ministry of Agriculture, Forestry and Food Security =

Government ministry of Sierra Leone

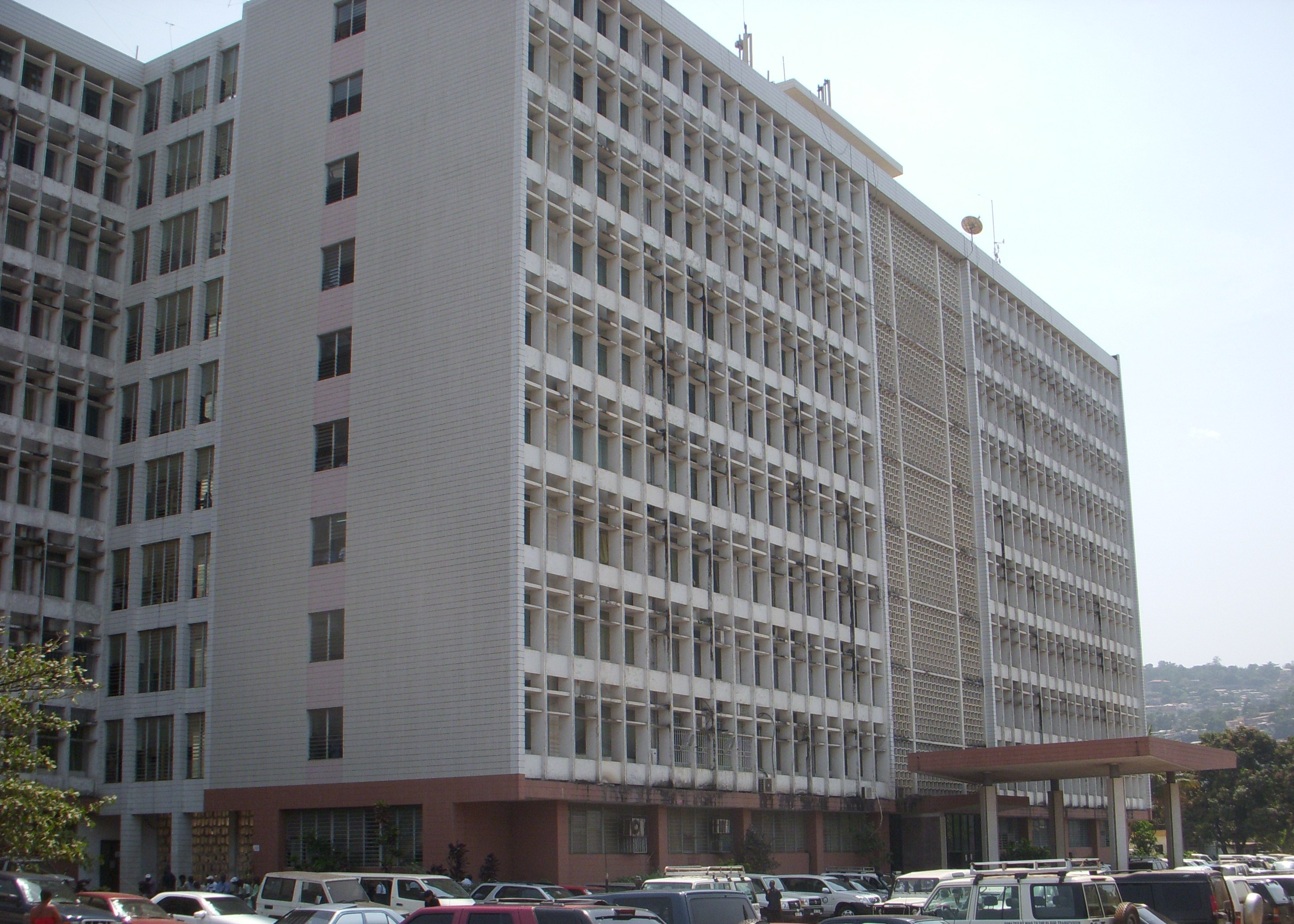
Youyi Building, Freetown, where the Ministry offices are located

The Ministry of Agriculture, Forestry and Food Security (MAFFS) is a governmental ministry of the Republic of Sierra Leone whose mandate is to formulate agricultural development policies and further advise on other matters relevant to agriculture. Their offices are located on the fourth floor of the Youyi Building, Brookfields, Freetown.
