= Ministry of Health and Sanitation (Sierra Leone) =

Government ministry of Sierra Leone

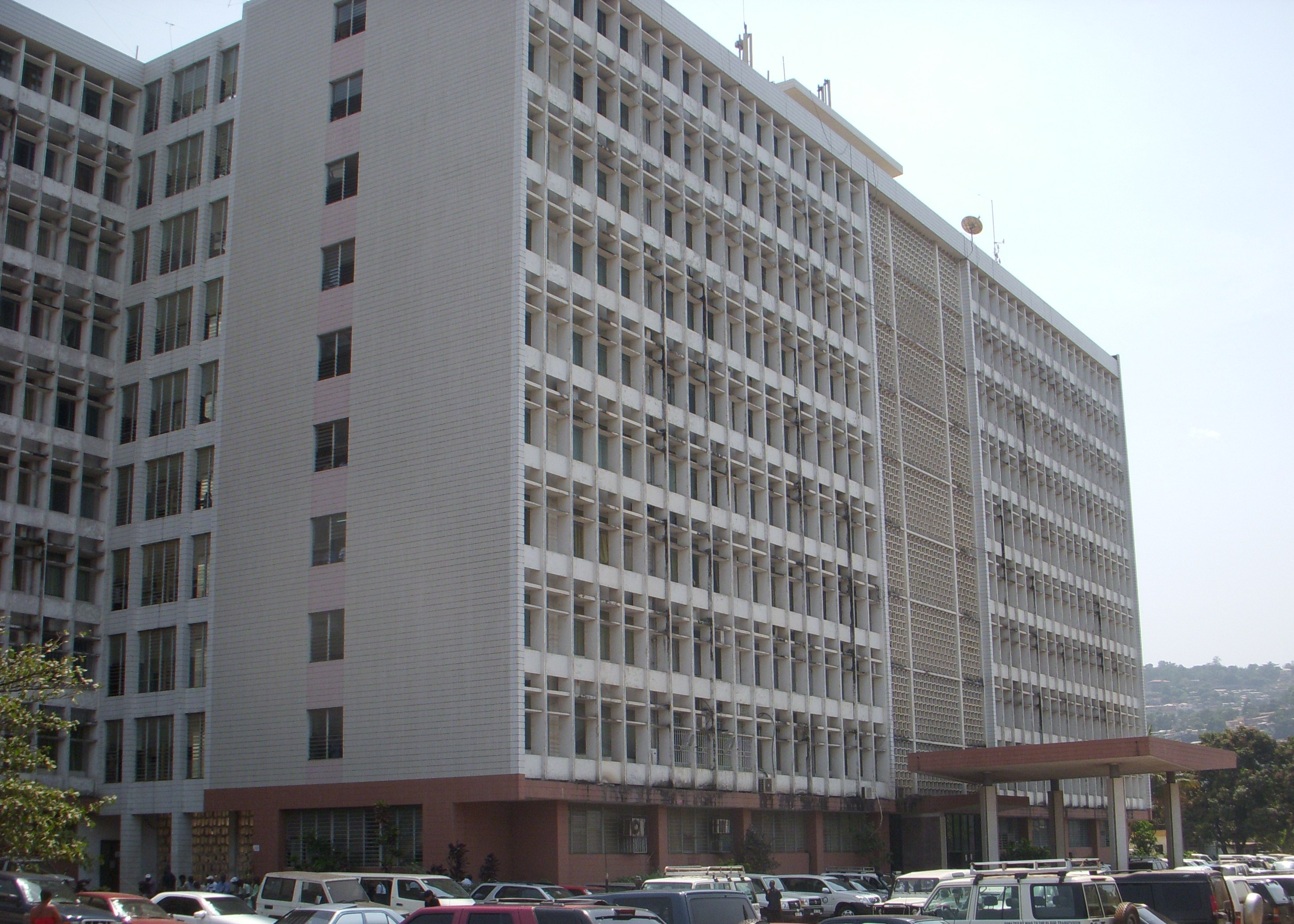
Youyi Building, Freetown, where the Ministry offices are located

The Ministry of Health and Sanitation (Krio: Ministri fɔ Wɛlbɔdi ɛn Sɛnitɛshɔn) is the health ministry of Sierra Leone. As of 2021, the Health Minister is Dr. Austin H. Demby. Their offices are located on the fourth floor of the Youyi Building, Brookfields, Freetown.

As of 2014, the Ministry of Health and Sanitation is engaged in a campaign against the Ebola virus epidemic in West Africa, in which Sierra Leone was one of the most seriously affected countries.

As part of a larger campaign to reduce Sierra Leone's maternal mortality rate, the ministry invested in the construction of the Paul E. Farmer Maternal Center of Excellence, a maternity hospital in Koidu, Kono District that opened in 2026. The facility contains the nation's first neonatal intensive care unit.

== See also ==
- Health in Sierra Leone
- Ebola virus epidemic in Sierra Leone
- Epilepsy Association of Sierra Leone
