= Ministry of Lands, Country Planning and the Environment =

Government ministry of Sierra Leone

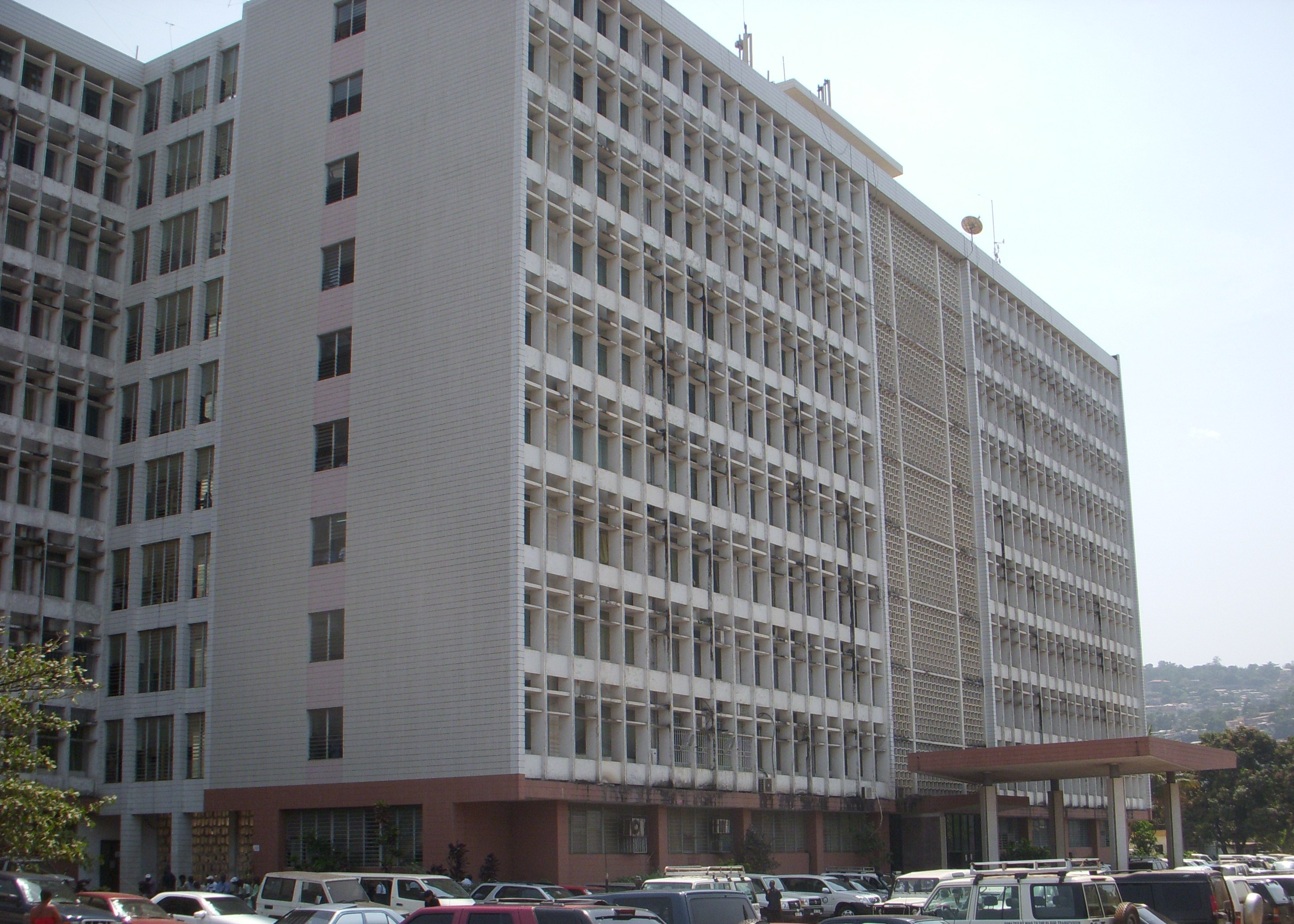
Youyi Building, Freetown, where the Ministry offices are located

The Sierra Leone Ministry of Lands, Country Planning and the Environment is a Sierra Leonean government department in charge of implementing policy as regards planning and the environment. Their offices are located on the 3rd floor of the Youyi Building, Brookfields, Freetown.

The Permanent Secretary is Israel B. K.Jigba

In 2015 the State Land Committee was reconstituted, and the Land Recovery Unit, a complaints and standards committee was set up.
