= Epilepsy Association of Sierra Leone =

Disability organization in Sierra Leone

- Abbreviation: EASL
- Formation: 1999/12/03
- Type: Non-governmental Organization
- Legal status: Society
- Purpose: Fight against Epilepsy
- Location: Sierra Leone
- Services: Training of Community Health Officers & Nurses
- Website: http://epilepsyassocsl.org/

The Epilepsy Association of Sierra Leone (EASL) is a non-profit organization based in Sierra Leone. The Epilepsy Association of Sierra Leone aims to establish medical assistance and training for the benefit of the indigenous population who have Epilepsy.

== Objectives ==
EASL was established with passion to counter act epilepsy at grass root level. The association aims to train the local health care officers, community workers, enrolled nurses & other volunteers. More than 300 members have been successfully trained technically to treat patients. Through its programs EASL strives to achieve the following:

- To bring awareness amongst the locals and treat epilepsy as a medical condition.
- To ensure availability of anti-epileptic medication.
- To perform outreach programs and provide support to the people with the disease.

== Areas ==
EASL has been successful in establishing treatment centers across 13 districts in Sierra Leone. Alongside the association also has 21 outreach treatment centers working towards the treatment of epilepsy.

== Collaborators ==
In order to achieve the task of training local health care workers EASL has associated with other governmental and non governmental bodies. The list is as follows:

- Medical Assistance Sierra Leone (MASL)
- Evangelical Fellowship of Sierra Leone (EFSL)
- Ministry of Health and Sanitation (MOH)
- St. Joseph Catholic Sisters
