= Government of Sierra Leone =

The government of Sierra Leone is the governing authority of the Republic of Sierra Leone, as established by the Sierra Leone Constitution. The Sierra Leone government is divided into three branches: the executive, legislative and the judiciary. The seat of government of Sierra Leone is in the capital Freetown.

Sierra Leone operates as a presidential representative democratic republic with a multi-party system, in which the President of Sierra Leone serves as both head of state and head of government. Executive power is exercised by the president. Legislative power is vested in the Parliament of Sierra Leone.

The judiciary of Sierra Leone is independent of the executive and the legislature. Civil rights and freedom of religion are respected. A critical press continues to operate, although the government has intervened for alleged inaccurate reporting, using the 1965 Public Order Act which criminalizes libel.

== Executive ==
Main office-holders
Office	Name	Party	Since
President	Julius Maada Bio	SLPP	4 April 2018
Vice-President	Mohamed Juldeh Jalloh	SLPP	4 April 2018

The current president is Julius Maada Bio (since 4 April 2018). The president is both the head of state and head of government. Ministers of State are appointed by the president with the approval of the House of Representatives; the cabinet is responsible to the president. The president is elected by popular vote for a five-year term; elections were last held on 4 April 2018 (Julius Maada Bio, SLPP, 51.8%; Samura Kamara, APC, 47.2%). The president's tenure of office is limited to two five-year terms.

=== Departments ===
- Ministry of Agriculture, Forestry and Food Security
- Ministry of Defence and National Security
- Ministry of Lands, Country Planning, & the Environment
- Ministry of Labour and Social Security
- Ministry of Mineral Resources
- Ministry of Health and Sanitation
- Ministry of Fisheries & Marine Resources
- Ministry of Information and Communication

== Legislative ==
The House of Representatives has 124 members, 112 members elected for a four-year term through proportional representation in 14 multi-seat constituencies with a constituency threshold of 12.5% and 12 Paramount chiefs.

== Judiciary ==
There is a High Court, an Appeals Court, and a Supreme Court. The judicial system continues to function for civil cases though some regard it as handicapped by shortages of resources and qualified personnel. Judges are appointed by the president on the advice of the Judicial and Legal Service Commission with the approval of Parliament.

There also are magistrate and local courts and from these appeals lie to the superior courts of judicature.

The 1991 constitution created an ombudsman responsible for looking into complaints of abuses and capricious acts on the part of public officials. In 2000 the government promulgated the Anti-Corruption Act to combat corruption.

== Administrative divisions ==
Sierra Leone is divided into provinces, districts, and chiefdoms. Sierra Leone has 3 rural provinces, plus a capital city administrative province. There are then 14 districts - 12 rural, 2 for the capital Freetown.

Sierra Leone is further divided into 149 chiefdoms. The chiefdoms are hereditary, tribal units of local governance. The World Bank sponsored the creation of elected local councils in 2004.

== Political parties and elections ==
- List of political parties in Sierra Leone
- Elections in Sierra Leone
