= United Nations Security Council Resolution 1436 =

UN Security Council Resolution 1436
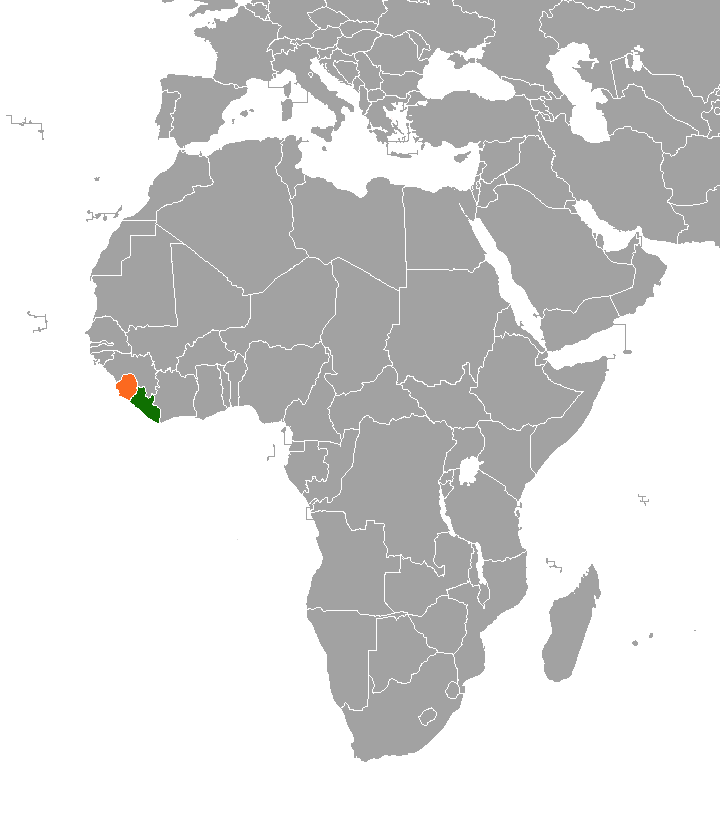
- Location of Sierra Leone and Liberia in Africa
- Date: 24 September 2002
- Meeting no.: 4,615
- Code: S/RES/1436 (Document)
- Subject: The situation in Sierra Leone
- Voting summary: 15 voted for; None voted against; None abstained
- Result: Adopted

Security Council composition
- Permanent members: China; France; Russia; United Kingdom; United States
- Non-permanent members: Bulgaria; Cameroon; Colombia; Guinea; Ireland; Mauritius; Mexico; Norway; Singapore; Syria

United Nations Security Council resolution 1436, adopted unanimously on 24 September 2002, after recalling all previous resolutions on the situation in Sierra Leone, the Council extended the mandate of the United Nations Mission in Sierra Leone (UNAMSIL) for a further six months beginning on 30 September 2002.

Sierra Leone President Ahmad Tejan Kabbah had requested the extension due to fighting in neighbouring Liberia which threatened the peace process.

== Resolution ==
=== Observations ===
In the preamble of the resolution, the holding of general elections in May 2002, the launch of the Special Court for Sierra Leone and Truth and Reconciliation Commission and progress made in developing the capacity of the Sierra Leone Police and armed forces was welcomed by the council. It noted the fragile situation in the Mano River region, particularly the conflict in neighbouring Liberia and the humanitarian implications. The importance of the extension of state authority in Sierra Leone including the diamond fields, the reintegration of ex-combatants, the return of refugees and internally displaced persons, and full respect for human rights and rule of law was stressed.

=== Acts ===
The security council praised the efforts of UNAMSIL troop-contributing countries and noted proposals by Secretary-General Kofi Annan regarding the size and structure of the peacekeeping operation. UNAMSIL was urged to complete phases 1 and 2 of the secretary-general's plan, including a reduction of troop size within 8 months. There was concern at a shortfall in financial contributions towards the disarmament, demobilisation and reintegration programme.

The resolution emphasised the development of institutions in Sierra Leone and welcomed efforts by the Sierra Leonean government to establish control in volatile diamond mining areas. It emphasised a comprehensive approach to strengthening the Sierra Leonean Police and supported the Special Court and Truth and Reconciliation Commission. Countries in the Mano River Union were urged to continue dialogue and implement commitments with regard to regional peace and security, and the Economic Community of West African States (ECOWAS) and Morocco were also encouraged to find a settlement of the crisis in the region.

The secretary-general intended to find a solution to the crisis in Liberia, which was welcomed by the council. Additionally, armed groups and the Liberian armed forces were called upon to refrain from illegal incursions into Sierra Leone. The security council welcomed steps by UNAMSIL to prevent sexual abuse and exploitation of women and children and its support for the return of refugees. Finally, the security, political, humanitarian and human rights situation in Sierra Leone would be kept under review by the Secretary-General.

== See also ==
- Elections in Sierra Leone
- List of United Nations Security Council Resolutions 1401 to 1500 (2002–2003)
- Sierra Leone Civil War – 1991–2002 war in West Africa
