= United Nations Security Council Resolution 1492 =

UN Security Council Resolution 1492
- Flag of Sierra Leone
- Date: 18 July 2003
- Meeting no.: 4,789
- Code: S/RES/1492 (Document)
- Subject: The situation in Sierra Leone
- Voting summary: 15 voted for; None voted against; None abstained
- Result: Adopted

Security Council composition
- Permanent members: China; France; Russia; United Kingdom; United States
- Non-permanent members: Angola; Bulgaria; Chile; Cameroon; Germany; Guinea; Mexico; Pakistan; Spain; Syria

United Nations Security Council resolution 1492, adopted unanimously on 18 July 2003, after recalling all previous resolutions on the situation in Sierra Leone, the council approved a four-stage reduction of the United Nations Mission in Sierra Leone, culminating in a complete withdrawal by December 2004.

The Security Council recognised the fragile security situation in the Mano River region, notably the civil war in neighbouring Liberia and the need to strengthen the capacity of the Sierra Leone Police and Armed Forces. It approved of the Secretary-General Kofi Annan's decision concerning the drawdown of the United Nations Mission in Sierra Leone by the end of 2004. The Secretary-General submitted additional recommendations in early 2004 regarding a residual United Nations presence in Sierra Leone.

Key benchmarks of the reduction were to be monitored by the council, while the Secretary-General was instructed to report at the end of each of the four phases on progress made.

== See also ==
- List of United Nations Security Council Resolutions 1401 to 1500 (2002–2003)
- Sierra Leone Civil War
- Special Court for Sierra Leone
