= United Nations Integrated Office in Sierra Leone =

The United Nations Integrated Office in Sierra Leone (UNIOSIL) was established by Resolution 1620 of the United Nations Security Council in 2005 to begin operations in 2006 as a follow-up to United Nations Mission in Sierra Leone (UNAMSIL) which helped end the Sierra Leone Civil War.

It was extended twice and ended on 30 September 2008; it was replaced with the United Nations Integrated Peacebuilding Office in Sierra Leone (UNIPSIL).
