= Ministry of Information and Communication (Sierra Leone) =

Government ministry of Sierra Leone

The Ministry of Information and Communication (Krio: Ministri fɔ Infɔmeshɔn ɛn Kɔmyunikeshɔn) is a governmental ministry of the Republic of Sierra Leone.
