= United Nations Integrated Peacebuilding Office in Sierra Leone =

The United Nations Integrated Peacebuilding Office in Sierra Leone (UNIPSIL) was established by the United Nations Security Council in 2008 to provide support to the Government of Sierra Leone in identifying and resolving tensions and threats of potential conflict, monitoring and promoting human rights, and consolidating good governance reforms. Former UN Secretary General Ban Ki Moon travelled to Freetown, Sierra Leone to mark the closure of UNIPSIL, which officially ended on 31 March 2014.

== See also ==
- United Nations Integrated Office in Sierra Leone (UNIOSIL)
