= United Nations Security Council Resolution 2321 =

UN Security Council Resolution 2321
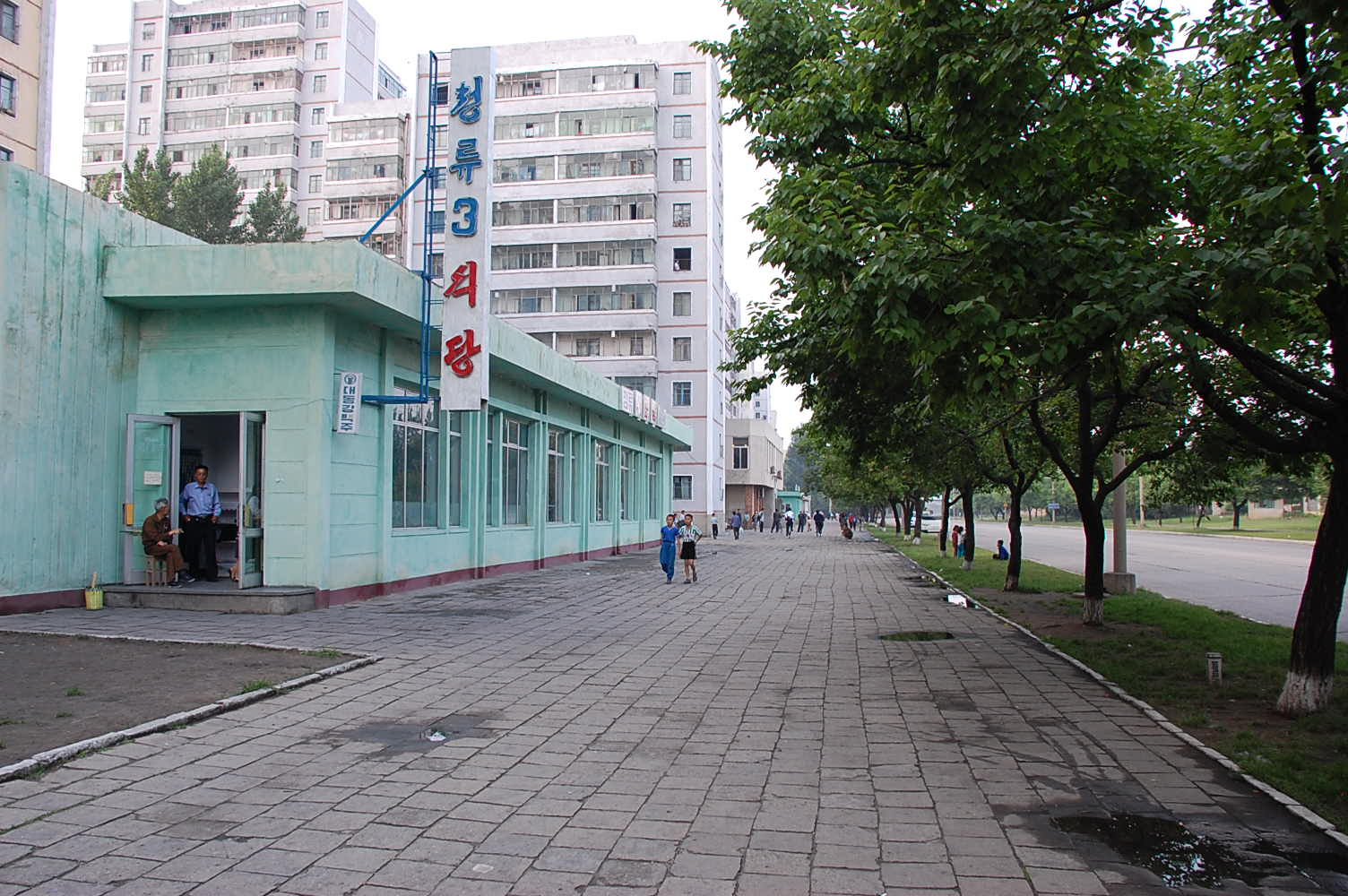
- Pyongyang, North Korea.
- Date: 30 November 2016
- Meeting no.: 7821
- Code: S/RES/2321 (Document)
- Subject: Non-proliferation - Democratic People's Republic of Korea
- Voting summary: 15 voted for; None voted against; None abstained
- Result: Adopted

Security Council composition
- Permanent members: China; France; Russia; United Kingdom; United States
- Non-permanent members: Angola; Egypt; Japan; Malaysia; New Zealand; Senegal; Spain; Ukraine; Uruguay; Venezuela

The United Nations Security Council unanimously adopted Resolution 2321 on its 7821st meeting, November 30, 2016. The resolution was primarily aimed at strengthening international sanctions against North Korea in response to its nuclear and ballistic missile programs. It was adopted as a response to September 2016 North Korean nuclear test.

== Background ==
The resolution was a response to the continued provocations by the Democratic People's Republic of Korea (DPRK), specifically its nuclear test conducted on September 9, 2016. This test violated several previous Security Council resolutions, including Resolutions 1718 (2006), 1874 (2009), 2087 (2013), 2094 (2013), and 2270 (2016).

== Significance ==
The resolution mainly expands arms embargo to the items listed in a new conventional arms dual-use list, and it prohibits the North Korea from supplying, selling or transferring such items from member states.

The resolution expanded sectoral sanctions by banning exports of copper, nickel, silver, and zinc. It also introduces restrictions on helicopters, vessels and maritime activity done by the North Korea. It also prohibited scientific and technical cooperation with North Korea, except for medical research.

Member states were required to implement the provisions of Resolution 2321 into their national legislation.

== Response ==
The G7 nations welcomed the adoption of Resolution 2321.
