= International sanctions against North Korea =

A number of countries and international bodies have imposed sanctions against North Korea, mostly due to North Korea's nuclear weapons program. The country conducted its first nuclear test in 2006. North Korea has faced multiple sanctions from many countries and international organizations, including the United States, European Union, United Nations, Canada, Australia, Switzerland, Norway, India, Israel, South Korea, Japan and others, making it the most sanctioned country in the world before the Russian invasion of Ukraine.

The United States first imposed sanctions on North Korea in the 1950s and tightened them further after international bombings against South Korea by North Korean agents during the 1980s, including the Rangoon bombing and the bombing of Korean Air Flight 858 in 1987. In 1988, the United States added North Korea to its list of state sponsors of terrorism. Sanctions against North Korea started to ease during the 1990s when South Korea's then-liberal government pushed for engagement policies with the North. The Clinton administration signed the Agreed Framework with North Korea in October 1994. However, the relaxation was short-lived; North Korea continued its nuclear program and officially withdrew from the Nuclear Non-Proliferation Treaty on 10 January 2003, causing countries to reinstate various sanctions. UN Security Council resolutions were passed after North Korea conducted nuclear tests in 2006, 2009, 2013, 2016, and 2017. Initially, sanctions were focused on trade bans on weapon-related materials and goods, but expanded to luxury goods to target the elite. Further sanctions expanded to cover financial assets, banking transactions, and general travel and trade.

To evade sanctions, North Korea has engaged in illicit activities abroad.

== Supranational bodies ==
=== European Union ===
The European Union imposed a series of sanctions against North Korea in 2006.

These sanctions were applied in various sectors:

1. Trade in various goods:

- Ban on arms exports to DPRK;
- Ban on exports of dual-use goods and goods which could be used in nuclear enrichment-related and nuclear testing activities;
- Ban on imports of crude oil, natural gas, petrochemical and petroleum products;
- Ban on the sale or supply of key equipment used in the energy sector;
- Ban on the sale or supply of gold, other precious metals and diamonds;
- Ban on certain naval equipment;
- Ban on certain software.

2. Financial sector:

- Freezing the assets of the Central Bank of DPRK and major North Korean commercial banks;
- Laying down notification and authorization mechanisms for transfers of funds above certain amounts to North Korean financial institutions.

3. Transport sector:

- Preventing access to EU airports for North Korean cargo flights;
- Ban on maintenance and service of North Korean cargo aircraft or vessels carrying prohibited materials or goods;
- Travel restrictions and asset freeze imposed against additional listed persons and entities.

4. Measures to combat internal repression:

- It is prohibited to sell, supply, transfer or export the following, whether or not it originates in the EU, to any person or body in North Korea or for use in North Korea:

- equipment which might be used for internal repression as listed in Annex III;
- equipment, technology or software identified in Annex IV, without prior authorisation from the relevant EU country.

- It is prohibited to provide technical assistance, brokering services and financing to any person or body in North Korea or for use in North Korea if the services are related to equipment which might be used for internal repression as listed in Annex III.
- It is prohibited to provide any telecommunication or internet monitoring or interception services to Iran's government, public bodies, corporations and agencies or to any person or entity acting on their behalf.

The Regulation (EU) No 359/2007 outlines:

- A freeze on funds and economic resources belonging to, owned or held by individuals or bodies listed in Annex I;
- A ban on funds or economic resources being made available to individuals, entities or bodies listed in Annex I;
- A ban on intentional activities to circumvent the above measures.
- Annex I is a list of persons who, in accordance with Decision 2011/235/CFSP, have been identified by the Council as being individuals responsible for serious human rights violations in North Korea, and those associated with them.
- EU countries may exceptionally authorise the release of frozen funds or economic resources, including for basic expenses such as food, medicines and utilities, and reasonable professional fees.

On 21 September 2017, EU banned oil exports and investments in North Korea.

=== United Nations Security Council ===
The UN Security Council has passed a number of resolutions since North Korea's first nuclear test in 2006.

- Resolution 1718, passed in 2006, demanded that North Korea cease nuclear testing and prohibited the export of some military supplies and luxury goods to North Korea. The resolution banned the DPRK from participating in any activities related to ballistic missiles, tightened the arms embargo and travel bans on individuals involved with the program, froze the funds and assets of the Korea Mining Development Trade Corporation and DPRK shipping lines, and recommended that states inspect North Korean cargo, prohibit the servicing of North Korean vessels involved in prohibited activities, prevent the provision of financial services used for sensitive nuclear activities, closely watch North Korean individuals and entities when dealing with them, prohibit the opening of North Korean banks on their territory, and prevent the DPRK's banks from entering into a relationship with their banks if it might contribute to their nuclear weapons and WMD program, and prevent financial institutions operating in their territory from opening offices and accounts in the DPRK. The UN Security Council Sanctions Committee on North Korea was established, supported from 2009 to 2024 by a panel of experts.
- Resolution 1874, passed after the second nuclear test in 2009, broadened the arms embargo. Member states were encouraged to inspect ships and destroy any cargo suspected of being related to the nuclear weapons program.
- Resolution 2087, passed in January 2013 after a satellite launch, strengthened previous sanctions by clarifying a state's right to seize and destroy cargo suspected of heading to or from North Korea for purposes of military research and development.
- Resolution 2094, passed in March 2013 after the third nuclear test, imposed sanctions on money transfers and aimed to shut North Korea out of the international financial system.
- Resolution 2270, passed in March 2016 after the fourth nuclear test, further strengthened existing sanctions. It banned the export of gold, vanadium, titanium, and rare earth metals. The export of coal and iron were also banned, with an exemption for transactions purely for "livelihood purposes."
- Resolution 2321, passed in November 2016, capped North Korea's coal exports and banned exports of copper, nickel, zinc, and silver. In February 2017, a UN panel said that 116 of 193 member states had not yet submitted a report on their implementation of these sanctions, though China had.
- Resolution 2371, passed in August 2017, banned all exports of coal, iron, lead, and seafood. The resolution also imposed new restrictions on North Korea's Foreign Trade Bank and prohibited any increase in the number of North Koreans working in foreign countries.
- Resolution 2375, passed on 11 September 2017, limited North Korean crude oil and refined petroleum product imports; banned joint ventures, textile exports, natural-gas condensate and liquid imports; and banned North Korean nationals from working abroad in other countries.
- Resolution 2397, passed on 22 December 2017 after the launch of a Hwasong-15 intercontinental ballistic missile, limited North Korean refined petroleum product imports to 500,000 barrels per year and crude oil imports to current levels; it also banned exports of food, machinery, earth and stones, wood, vessels and electrical equipment. The resolution further prohibited imports of industrial equipment, machinery, transportation vehicles, and industrial metals, and called for the repatriation of all North Korean nationals earning income abroad within 24 months. The resolution also authorized member states to seize and inspect any vessel in their territorial waters found to be illicitly providing oil to or smuggling coal or other prohibited products from the DPRK.

United Nations agencies are restricted in the aid they can provide North Korea due to the sanctions, but remain able to help with nutrition, health, water, and sanitation.

== States ==
=== Australia ===
Australia has imposed a series of sanctions against North Korea since October 2006. The Australian Defence Force periodically deploys ships and aircraft to contribute to efforts to enforce the sanctions against North Korea through Operation Argos, which:

- Prohibits the opening in Australia of new branches, subsidiaries or representative offices of North Korean banks.
- Prohibits North Korean banks from establishing new joint ventures, or taking an ownership interest in or establishing or maintaining correspondent relationships with Australian banks.
- Prohibits Australian financial institutions from opening representative offices or subsidiaries or banking accounts in North Korea.
- Applies enhanced monitoring to prevent all such transactions.

=== Canada ===
In 2006, the Canadian government imposed the Special Economic Measures Act (SEMA), which calls for an import/export ban as well as a financial services ban on North Korea.

=== China ===
In February 2017, China banned all imports of coal from North Korea for the rest of the year. China also banned exports of some petroleum products and imports of textiles from North Korea in line with United Nations resolutions.

=== Japan ===
In 2006, Japan imposed sanctions against North Korea, including:

- A ban on investing in oil and gas from North Korea.
- A ban on supplying chemical, biological, radiological, or nuclear weapons technology, goods, or materials to North Korea.
- The inspection of cargo from North Korea in Japanese ports.
  - A ban on North Korean airplanes flying to Japan if they are involved in WMD and nuclear weapons activities.
- The freezing of assets of 15 North Korean banks, termination of all existing correspondent banking relationships with those banks.
  - A ban on any new correspondent accounts or relationships with any North Korean bank.
- A ban on funds transfers between Japan and North Korea related to North Korea's activities pertaining to the supply of large conventional weapons, with financial institutions being obliged to scrutinize transactions accordingly and report monthly on all North Korea-related transfers.
- A ban on Japanese companies providing insurance or reinsurance services to North Korea, if the activities covered could contribute to North Korea's nuclear activities or supply of large conventional weapons.
- A ban on Japanese financial institutions opening branches or subsidiaries in North Korea, and vice versa.
- The Government of Japan's cessation of all new oil and gas-related investment in North Korea by refraining from entering into new medium to long-term commitments for export credit for trade with North Korea.
- The establishment of a financial authorization system for all transactions between Japan and North Korea.
  - A ban on the transfer of proliferation sensitive dual-use items to North Korea, and on any new investments.
  - A ban on the sale of goods, services, and technology to North Korea's energy sector.

=== Russia ===
On 30 March 2010, President Dmitry Medvedev signed a decree implementing intensified United Nations Security Council sanctions against Pyongyang's nuclear programs. The presidential decree banned the purchase of weapons and relevant materials from the DPRK by government offices, enterprises, banks, organizations and individuals currently under Russia's jurisdiction. It also prohibited the transit of weapons and relevant materials via Russian territory or their export to the DPRK. Any financial aid and educational training that might facilitate North Korea's nuclear program and proliferation activities were also forbidden.

In December 2013, Russia joined the sanctions against North Korea, introduced in March by the UN Security Council (Resolution 2087). The corresponding decree signed by President Vladimir Putin specified that Russian companies were prohibited to provide North Korea any technical assistance and advice in the development and production of ballistic missiles. In addition, North Korean naval vessels at Russian ports would be required to undergo inspection. Russian authorities were also ordered to be vigilant when dealing with North Korean diplomats.

In October 2017, President Putin signed decree No. 484 "On measures to implement UN Security Council resolution 2321 of November 30, 2016" imposing sanctions on North Korea in connection with the adoption of UN Security Council resolution 2321 of 30 November 2016. The decree supplements a number of applications, including a list of individuals and legal entities associated with the North Korean nuclear program or its ballistic missile program, which are subject to restrictions. The measures provided for by Security Council resolution 2321 introduce additional bans on trade, economic, banking, financial, scientific and technical cooperation with North Korea. In the trade and economic field, the purchase of copper, nickel, silver and zinc from North Korea is prohibited. At the same time, the exception provided for by UN Security Council resolution 2270 of 2 March 2016 is retained for the project for the transit of Russian coal (by Russian Railways) through the North Korean port of Rajin for subsequent export to other countries. Scientific and technical cooperation with the participation of persons or groups representing North Korea should be suspended, with the exception of exchanges in the field of medicine. Targeted restrictions expanded to a number of North Korean individuals and legal entities, as well as lists of products, including "luxury goods", the import and export of which is prohibited to and from North Korea. In addition, the list was expanded of dual-use goods and other items whose import into the DPRK is prohibited due to their potential use for the nuclear missile program of the country and other actions that violate the North Korean sanctions regime. The document also provides for a complete ban on the import of textile products from North Korea. Additional restrictions on cooperation in the transport sector were introduced in the decree: the delivery of new helicopters and ships to North Korea became prohibited; all seagoing ships owned or controlled by North Korea should be removed from state registration; and North Korean aircraft and ship inspection measures were tightened on the territory of UN member states.

Since June 2024, satellite images have shown several North Korean tankers in Russia's Vostochny Port. The vessels had turned their transponders off, with journalists identifying seven ships, apparently loading Russian oil and with their capacity alone circumventing the 500,000-barrel limitation put in place by the UN Security Council. Amid the Russian invasion of Ukraine, the petrochemicals are allegedly paid for with deliveries of North Korean weapons and ammunition.

=== South Korea ===
In November 2006, South Korea said it would support all parts of UN resolution 1718. In addition to most of UN resolution 1718, South Korea imposed the following sanctions:

- A ban on sensitive nuclear, chemical, biological, radiological weapons technology, goods, materials, and service to North Korea.
- The inspection of cargo of North Korea in high seas, and the seizure and disposal of banned cargo.
- A ban on the opening of branches, subsidiaries, or representative offices of DPRK banks in the ROK (including any Rodong Bank branches in Seoul and Busan), or any correspondences and joint ventures.
- A ban on North Korean gas and oil investments.
- A ban on sales of conventional weapon and missile technology to the DPRK.
- Restrictions on financial support, including export letters, insurance, and reinsurance.
- Sanctions on 161 entities and 156 individuals of North Korea, including Rodong Bank, DPRK shipping lines, and the Korea Mining Development Trade Corporation.
- A ban on sales of conventional weapons, including battle tanks, armored combat vehicles, large caliber artillery systems, combat aircraft, attack helicopters, warships, missiles, and missile systems.
- A ban on financial aid to North Korea, including fuel sales.

In 2010, South Korea imposed further sanctions against North Korea in response to the sinking of the ROKS Cheonan, known as the May 24 measures. These sanctions included:

- Banning North Korean ships from South Korean territorial waters.
- Suspending inter-Korean trade except inside the Kaesong Industrial Region.
- Banning most cultural exchanges.

In 2016, President Park Geun-hye ordered the Kaesong Industrial Region to close in retaliation for the nuclear test in January and the rocket launch in February.

In 2019, a UN panel accused South Korea of violating sanctions by not notifying the Security Council about its deliveries of petroleum products for use at the inter-Korean joint liaison office. In the Annex of the Updated Guidance on Addressing North Korea's Illicit Shipping Practices, issued by the United States Treasury, a South Korean ship was listed as that believed to have engaged in ship-to-ship transfers with North Korean tankers.

=== Taiwan ===
In 2017, Taiwan banned trade with North Korea to comply with UN resolutions despite not being a member of the UN. North Korea is Taiwan's 174th largest trading partner, and imported US$1.2 million and exported US$36,575 in goods from January to July 2017.

A year later, former High Court judge Chiang Kuo-hua and his son Chiang Heng had allegedly evaded North Korean sanctions by chartering a ship to transport anthracite coal into the country from Vietnam that summer. Both of them and two other PRC nationals were accused of assisting terrorists and forging documents.

=== United States ===
The United States imposed sanctions on North Korea due to its nuclear weapons and WMD program, missile launch, and human rights violations, as well as its support for various militant groups, including Hezbollah in Lebanon, Hamas in Palestine, the Houthis in Yemen, and Iraqi Shia groups, including Harakat Hezbollah al-Nujaba and Kata'ib Hezbollah.

From 1950 to 2008, trade between the United States and North Korea was restricted under the Trading with the Enemy Act of 1917. After 2008, some restrictions related to the International Emergency Economic Powers Act stayed in effect. Exports of some basic goods such as food, agricultural commodities, medicines, fertilizers, disaster relief material, medical devices, seeds, etc. to North Korea are usually exempt from these sanctions. In February 2016, the North Korea Sanctions and Policy Enhancement Act of 2016 (H.R. 757Pub. L. 114–122 (text) (PDF)) was passed. The law:

- Requires the President to sanction entities found to have contributed to North Korea's weapons of mass destruction program, arms trade, human rights abuses, or other illegal activities.
- Imposes mandatory sanctions on entities involved in North Korea's mineral or metal trade, which comprises a large part of North Korea's foreign exports.
- Requires the United States Treasury to determine whether North Korea should be listed as a "primary money laundering concern," which would trigger tough new financial restrictions.
- Imposes new sanctions on authorities related to North Korean human rights and cybersecurity abuse.

In July 2017, after the death of tourist Otto Warmbier, the United States government banned U.S. citizens from visiting North Korea without special validation starting 1 September 2017.

In August 2017, the Countering America's Adversaries Through Sanctions Act was passed.

On 21 September 2017, President Donald Trump issued Executive Order 13810, allowing the United States to cut from its financial system or freeze assets of any companies, businesses, organizations, and individuals trading in goods, services, or technology with North Korea. Aircraft or ships having entered North Korea are banned from entering the United States for 180 days; the same restriction applies to ships that conduct ship-to-ship transfers with North Korean ships. Treasury Secretary Steven Mnuchin stated that "Foreign financial institutions are now on notice that going forward they can choose to do business with the United States or North Korea, but not both." A statement from the White House said, "Foreign financial institutions must choose between doing business with the United States or facilitating trade with North Korea or its designated supporters." On 25 September 2017, the U.S. Treasury barred the entry of North Korean nationals to the United States.

Following the abduction of a South Korean fishing vessel, additional sanctions were ordered by the Treasury on 26 October 2017, following a culmination of "flagrant" rights abuses, including executions, torture, and forced labour. Seven individuals and three North Korean entities were affected by the sanctions.

On 11 July 2018, during a summit in Brussels, NATO leaders called for continued pressure and ongoing sanctions enforcement on North Korea. The group of 29 countries, including the United States, signed a declaration that called on members to maintain pressure on North Korea, though also welcomed recent diplomatic progress in the region.

On 13 November 2018, U.S. Vice President Mike Pence and Japanese Prime Minister Shinzō Abe reaffirmed the need to keep sanctions on North Korea to achieve its denuclearization. On 20 December 2018, it was reported that the United States plans to review its ban on U.S. travel to North Korea. President Trump welcomed sanctions against North Korea imposed by China and Russia in 2019.

On 12 January 2022, the U.S. Department of the Treasury's Office of Foreign Assets Control imposed sanctions on five North Korean officials accused of being responsible for procuring goods for the DPRK's weapons of mass destruction (WMD) and ballistic missile-related programs. In addition, the State Department ordered sanctions against another North Korean, a Russian man, and a Russian company for their broader support of North Korea's weapons of mass destruction activities.

On 1 December 2022, U.S. National Security Advisor Jake Sullivan said that a new round of sanctions was being prepared against North Korea. Sullivan also said that the U.S. was "committed to using pressure and diplomacy to entice North Korea into giving up its nuclear arsenal."

In July 2024, the U.S. sanctioned individuals and entities in China for their alleged involvement in the procurement of items for North Korea's ballistic missile and space programs.

== Evasion of sanctions ==
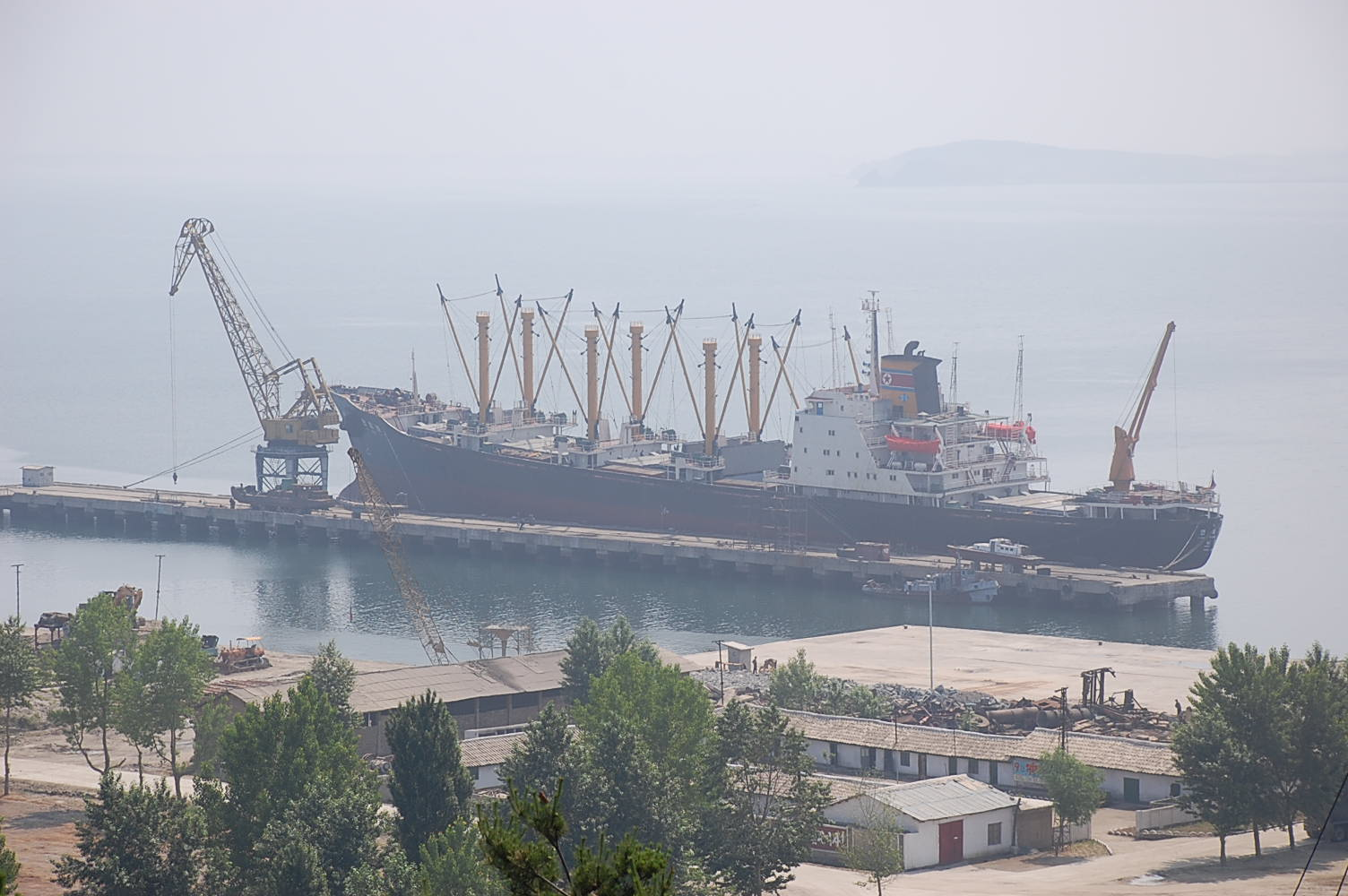
A North Korean cargo ship at the dock in Nampo

In 2017, a report by the United Nations Panel of Experts stated that North Korea was covertly trading in arms and minerals despite sanctions against the same. In April 2019, the Panel reported that North Korea had developed a number of techniques and a complex web of organizations to enable it to evade the sanctions. The techniques included falsification of documents and covert ship-to-ship transfers of cargo at sea.

In 2017 and 2018, U.S. President Donald Trump accused China and Russia of violating sanctions against North Korea.

In May 2019, the United States announced it had seized a North Korean cargo vessel for carrying a coal shipment in defiance of sanctions. The Justice Department said the 17,061-tonne Wise Honest is one of the North's largest cargo ships; she was first detained by Indonesia in April 2018 but was now in the possession of the United States.

On February 11, 2022, Taiwanese shipping company Cheng Chiun Shipping Agency Co Ltd (CCSA) is reported to have covertly provided North Korea with oil to evade sanctions. In March 2024, the UN Panel of Experts reported that North Korea had smuggled up to 1.5 million barrels of oil the previous year.

In March 2024, Russia vetoed the renewal of the Panel of Experts' mandate. According to Linda Thomas-Greenfield, US Ambassador to the UN, she suggested that other alternatives are being looked into to continue monitoring sanctions, including monitoring through the General Assembly, the creation of an independent monitoring institute, and regular multilateral meetings on sanctions enforcement.

In March 2025, North Korean apples were found to be sold in Russian supermarkets via the state business Korea Hwanggumsan Trading Corporation.

== Assessment ==
The academic John Delury has described the sanctions as futile and counterproductive. He has argued that they are unenforceable and unlikely to stop North Korea's nuclear weapons program.

On the other hand, Sung-Yoon Lee, a professor in Korean Studies at the Fletcher School, and Joshua Stanton advocate continued tightening of sanctions and targeting Pyongyang's systemic vulnerabilities, such as blocking the regime's "offshore hard currency reserves and income with financial sanctions, including secondary sanctions against its foreign enablers. This would significantly diminish, if not altogether deny, Kim the means to pay his military, security forces and elites that repress the North Korean public."

International sanctions have a negative impact on the North Korean population, in particular on their worsening food situation. The sanctions have resulted in delays in the arrival of humanitarian and food aid. Non-governmental organizations are thus hampered in their mission to bring aid in time to those who need it. The sanctions also affect, among others, the medical and agricultural sectors, as well as the country's economy in general.

It is estimated by Kim B. Park of the WHO panel that sanctions in 2018 resulted in around 4000 preventable deaths due to delays in exemptions for programs by NGOs and the UN agencies that have humanitarian programs in North Korea.

The agricultural impact is highlighted in a report jointly made by the World Food Programme and the Food and Agriculture Organization. The report outlines the negative effects on irrigation and production yield due to restrictions in machinery, spare parts, fuels, and fertilizers.
