= United Nations Security Council Resolution 2094 =

UN Security Council Resolution 2094
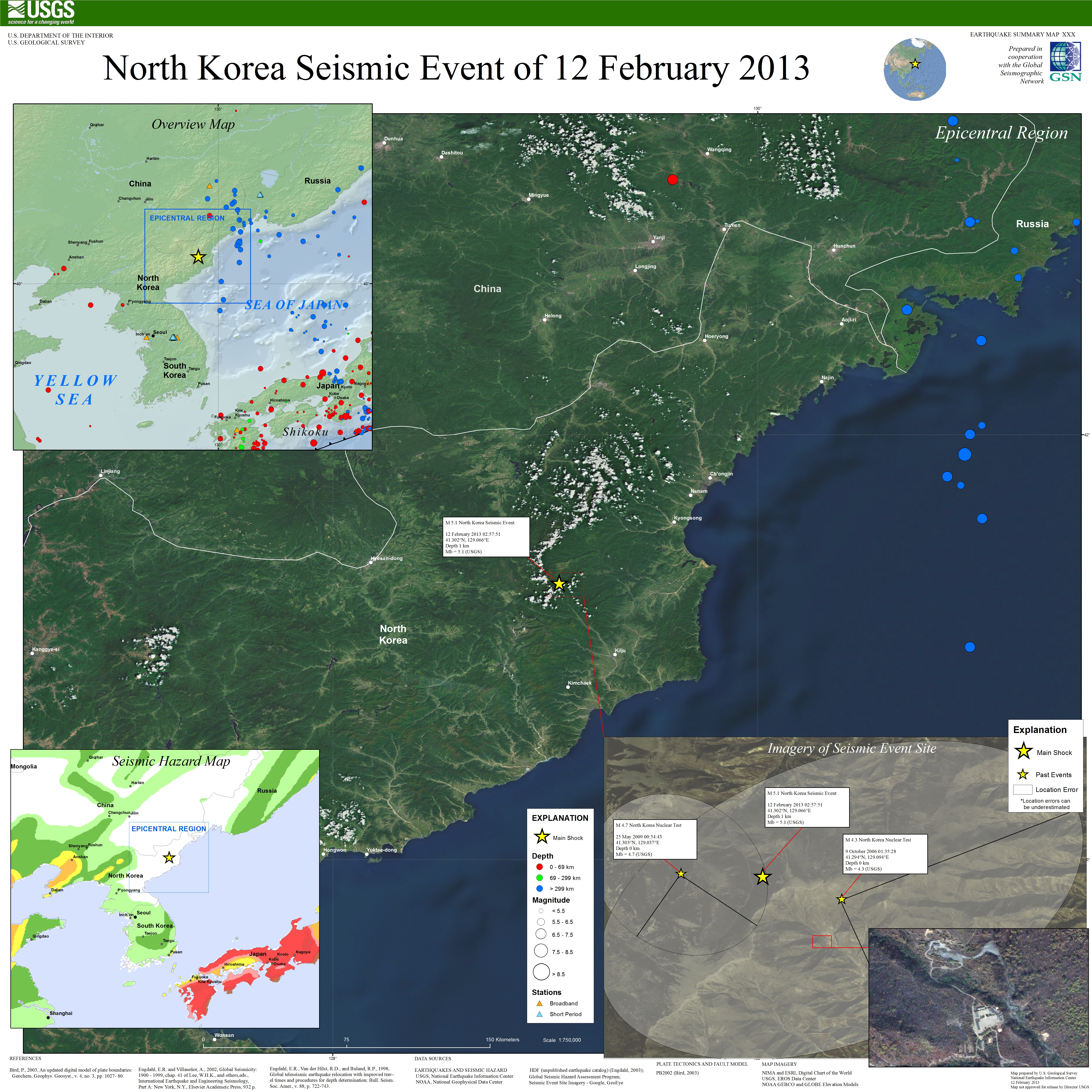
- USGS Infographic depicting the seismic activity caused by the nuclear test which prompted the resolution
- Date: 7 March 2013
- Meeting no.: 6,932
- Code: S/RES/2094 (Document)
- Subject: Non-proliferation — Democratic People's Republic of Korea
- Voting summary: 15 voted for; None voted against; None abstained
- Result: Adopted

Security Council composition
- Permanent members: China; France; Russia; United Kingdom; United States
- Non-permanent members: Argentina; Australia; Azerbaijan; Guatemala; South Korea; Luxembourg; Morocco; Pakistan; Rwanda; Togo

United Nations Security Council resolution 2094, adopted unanimously on March 7, 2013, after recalling all previous relevant resolutions on the situation concerning North Korea, including resolutions 825 (1993), 1540 (2004), 1695 (2006), 1718 (2006), 1874 (2009), and 2087 (2013), the Council condemned North Korea's third nuclear test. Furthermore, it increased the power of other nations to enforce these sanctions.

== Prohibiting sectors ==
UN resolution 2094 : sanctions over north Korea third nuclear tests include banned Provisions

• Nuclear tests are condemned as a violation of the resolution and further provocative acts are prohibited.

-• prohibition of sales;

- nuclear weapons

- all types of weapons except small arms and light weapons include strategic and conventional weapons

- all military and paramilitary police vehicles and equipment

- bans of all weapons including spare parts, related materials, technology, goods

• Condemning nuclear-related activities, including uranium enrichment, and confirming obligations such as the complete abandonment of nuclear programs.

• It warned that in the event of further launches or tests, the Security Council would express its determination to take significant additional measures.

• Financial Sanctions

• Three individuals and two organizations have been designated for asset freezing.

• The ban on financial services was expanded to cover not only nuclear and missile-related activities but also prohibited acts and sanctions evasion activities under resolutions such as trade in prohibited goods, and the request for a ban was changed to an obligation. Large-scale cash transfers were also restricted.

• Requests a ban on the opening of bank accounts or branches, and correspondent contracts, by North Korea, which is suspected of engaging in prohibited activities and evading sanctions under the resolutions like United Nations security council resolution 1718.

• Prohibition on public financial assistance (export credits, guarantees, insurance) that may contribute to activities prohibited by the Resolutions.

• Sanctions against people

• Three additional people have been designated for entry ban.

• Those who are not designated will also be barred from entering the country if the country determines that they have evaded sanctions. North Koreans will be deported, with exceptions such as for humanitarian reasons.

• The resolution urges all countries to step up vigilance to ensure that North Korean diplomats do not contribute to acts prohibited by the resolution.

• Sanctions on goods Additional embargoed items

• Two nuclear-related items (fluorine-based lubricants, bellows valves resistant to corrosion by UF6 )

• Five missile-related items (special corrosion-resistant steel, ultra-high temperature ceramic composites, pyrotechnic valves, wind tunnel-compatible measurement and control devices, and sodium perchlorate)

• One chemical weapon-related item (such as a vacuum pump with a discharge capacity of more than 1 cubic meter per hour)

• Directs the Sanctions Committee to update the existing embargo list within 12 months.

• Requests and permits countries to embargo goods that they determine could contribute to nuclear or missile development. Directs the committee to issue guidelines.

• Clarification of luxury goods subject to export bans (this does not restrict countries from banning the export of other luxury goods)

• Jewelry

• Jewelry with pearls

• jewelry

• Precious and semi-precious stones (including diamonds, sapphires, rubies and emeralds)

• Precious metals and metal- clad jewelry with precious metals

• vehicle

• Yacht

• Motor vehicles: Passenger cars and other motor vehicles (excluding public transport), including station wagons, used to transport people

• Luxury cars, racing cars

• Cargo Inspection

• Mandatory cargo inspection within one's territory for cargo suspected to be prohibited goods

• Prohibiting entry into one's own ports of ships that refuse requests for cargo inspection on the high seas (except in emergency cases, etc.) Air transport restrictions

• Requesting a ban on takeoff, landing, and overflight of aircraft suspected of carrying prohibited goods (except in emergency cases) prohibiting items additionally

• prohibition on sales of aircraft, aircraft engines, rocket fuel to north Korea

• items include 8 types of telecommunications include; - electronic equipment, communication equipment, computers, electronic information technology equipment, phones, tablets, semiconductor, four wheel drive vehicles, laptop computers

== See also ==
- 2013 Korean crisis
- List of United Nations Security Council Resolutions 2001 to 2100 (2011–present)
