= Nepal–North Korea relations =

- Nepal: North Korea

Bilateral foreign relations between Nepal and North Korea were officially established on 15 May 1974.

Nepal does not have an embassy in North Korea; instead, Nepal's embassy in Beijing concurrently serves as a non-resident ambassador to North Korea. North Korea's embassy in New Delhi similarly does so to Nepal, after the embassy in Kathmandu closed in 2023.

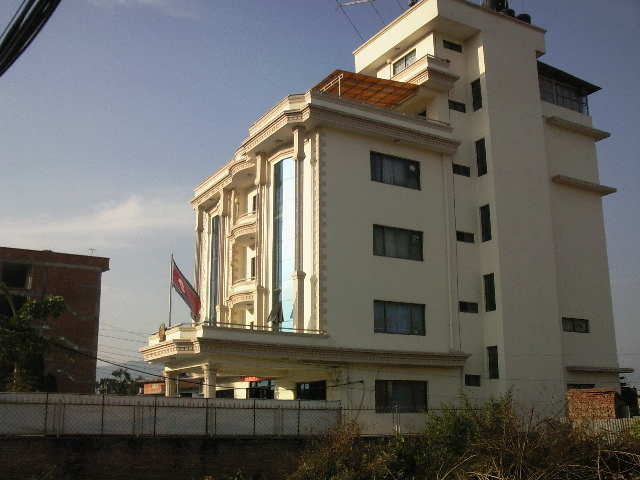
The closed North Korean Embassy in Kathmandu

In 2017, Nepal's former prime minister, Madhav Kumar Nepal, visited Pyongyang. In 2019, Nepal deported 12 North Koreans "in an attempt to abide by UN resolution 2397".
