= United Nations Security Council Resolution 2087 =

UN Security Council Resolution 2087
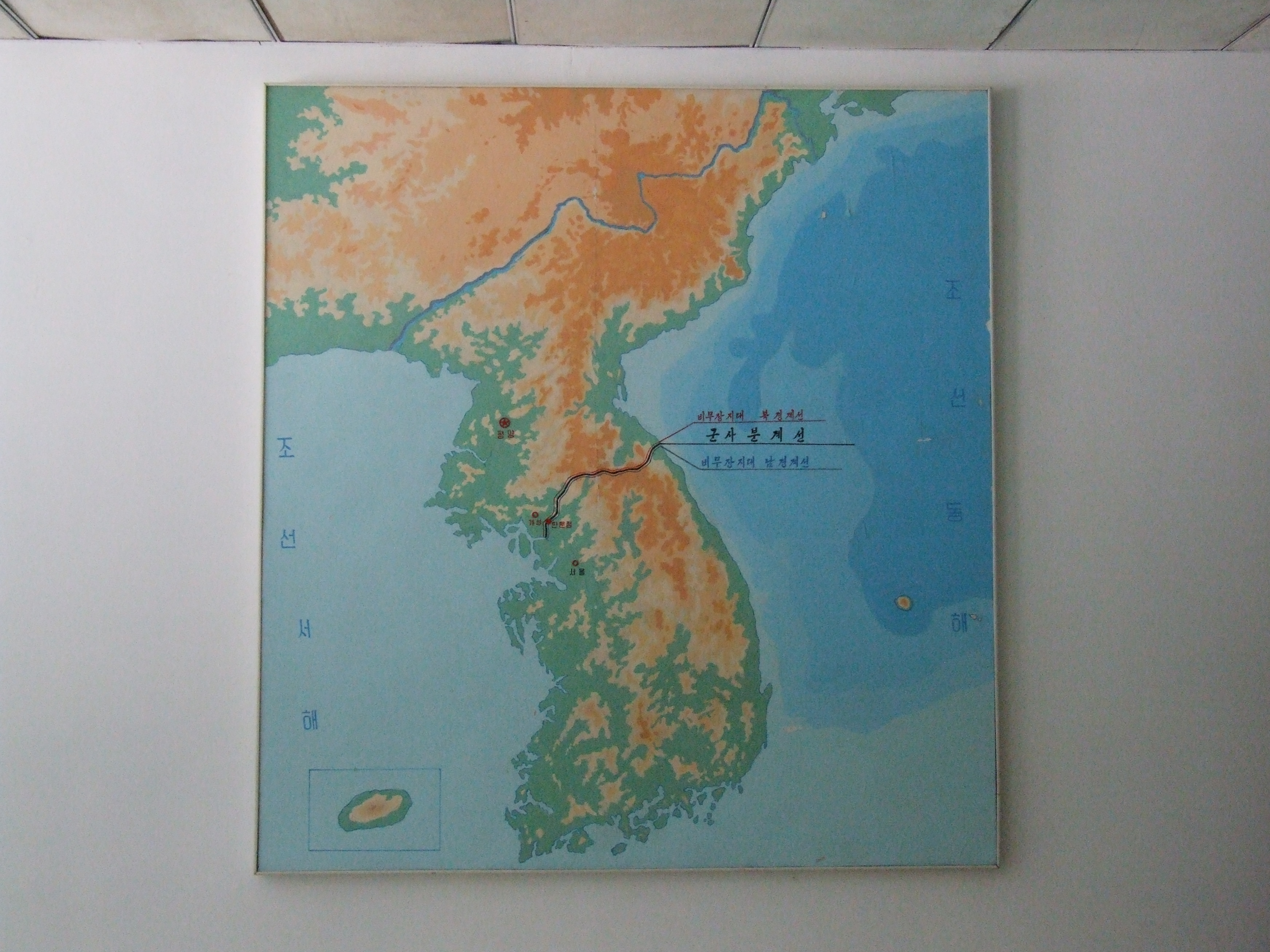
- Map of Korea
- Date: 22 January 2013
- Meeting no.: 6,904
- Code: S/RES/2087 (2013) (Document)
- Subject: The situation concerning the Democratic People's Republic of Korea
- Voting summary: 15 voted for; None voted against; None abstained
- Result: Adopted

Security Council composition
- Permanent members: China; France; Russia; United Kingdom; United States
- Non-permanent members: Argentina; Australia; Azerbaijan; Guatemala; South Korea; Luxembourg; Morocco; Pakistan; Rwanda; Togo

United Nations Security Council Resolution 2087, adopted unanimously on January 22, 2013, after recalling all previous relevant resolutions on the situation concerning North Korea, including resolutions 825 (1993), 1540 (2004), 1695 (2006), 1718 (2006), and 1874 (2009), the Council condemned the December 12, 2012 rocket launch by the Democratic People's Republic of Korea.

== See also ==
- 2013 North Korean nuclear test
- 2013 North Korean cargo ship confrontation in Panama
- List of United Nations Security Council Resolutions 2001 to 2100 (2011–present)
