= United Nations Security Council Resolution 2270 =

UN Security Council Resolution 2270
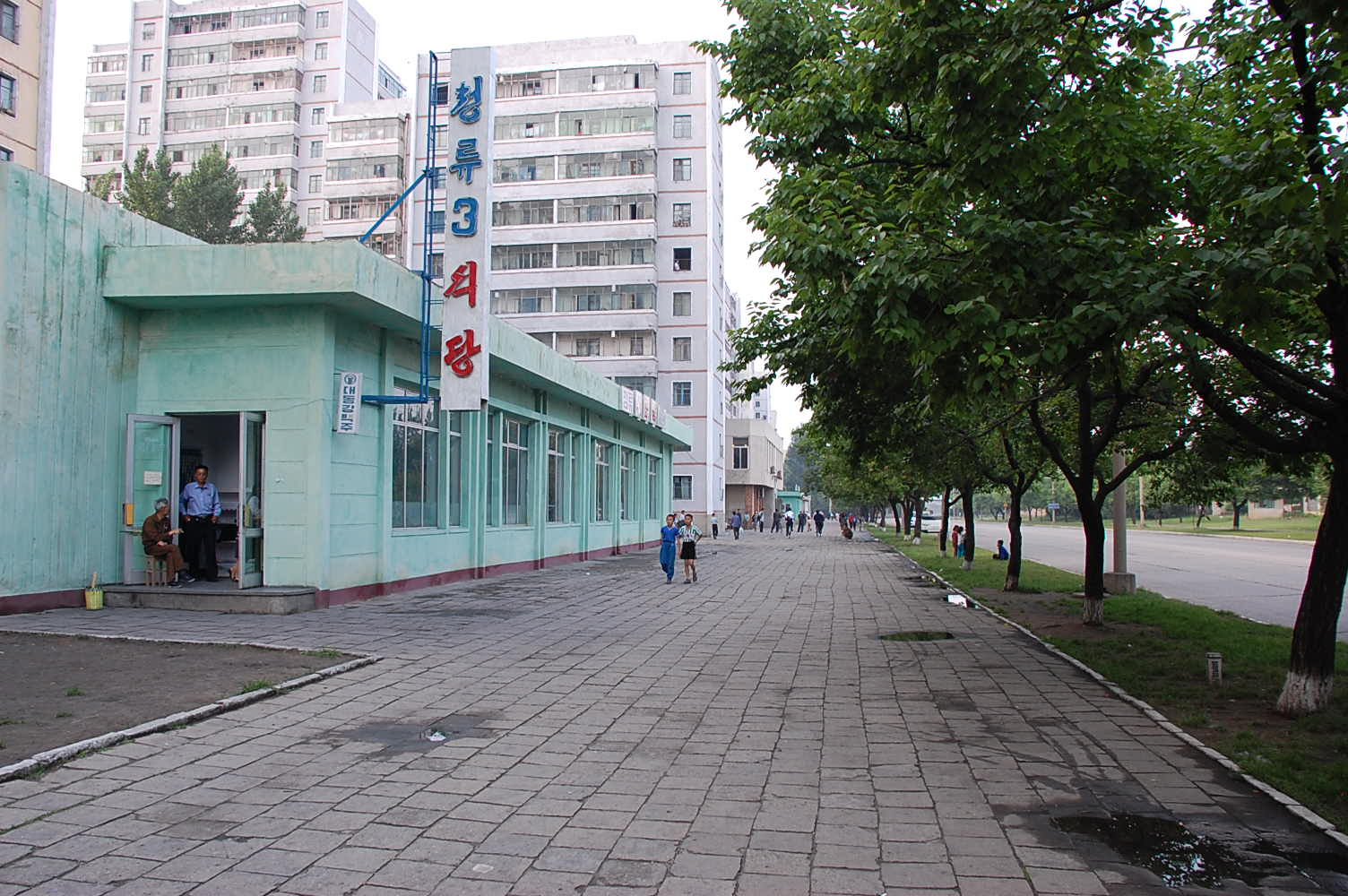
- Pyongyang, North Korea.
- Date: 2 March 2016
- Meeting no.: 7,638
- Code: S/RES/2270 (Document)
- Subject: Non-proliferation - Democratic People's Republic of Korea
- Voting summary: 15 voted for; None voted against; None abstained
- Result: Adopted

Security Council composition
- Permanent members: China; France; Russia; United Kingdom; United States
- Non-permanent members: Angola; Egypt; Japan; Malaysia; New Zealand; Senegal; Spain; Ukraine; Uruguay; Venezuela

The United Nations Security Council unanimously adopted Resolution 2270 on March 2, 2016, with approval of all the five permanent members and the ten non-permanent members in response to North Korea’s fourth nuclear test on January 6, 2016, and its launch of a long-range missile carrying what it said was a satellite on February 7, 2016.

== Background ==
North Korea conducted its third nuclear test on February 12, 2013, and in response, the UN Security Council convened to discuss sanctions against the country. North Korea made its first announcement about a fourth nuclear test during the March 31st Plenary Meeting of the Central Committee of the Workers' Party of Korea, where the leadership also adopted the policy of "parallel development of economy and nuclear power".

Since then, North Korea has continued development tests of various missiles, such as intercontinental ballistic missiles (ICBM) designed for nuclear weapons delivery and submarine-launched ballistic missiles (SLBM), while concentrating on miniaturization, weight-reduction and diversification of nuclear weapons.

Members of the international community such as the UN had already been enhancing broader sanctions against North Korea after the country's third nuclear test, by adopting and implementing United Nations Security Council Resolution 2094, which targeted illicit activities of North Korean diplomats, bulk cash transfers, and financial relationships.

North Korea nevertheless pushed ahead with its fourth nuclear test on January 6, 2016, to which the UN Security Council responded by convening to discuss North Korea sanctions. North Korea continued to launch a long-range missile on February 7, and the UN Security Council passed Resolution 2270 with approval of all the council members. Thirty-five countries have submitted an implementation report in accordance with the resolution, including China, which presented its implementation report on June 8.

== Significance ==
While the Security Council's previous sanctions against North Korea primarily targeted North Korea's development of weapons of mass destruction (WMD), Resolution 2270 contains exceptionally comprehensive sanctions against North Korea beyond responses to the development of WMD, which are expected to have a profound impact across many facets of North Korea.

The main provisions of the resolution include weapons transactions, proliferation of nuclear activities, maritime and air transport, export control of WMD, foreign trade, and financial transactions. The resolution also affirms that any transfer of weapons for the purpose of maintenance and services constitutes violations, and it designates a number of North Korean bodies to be subject to sanctions, including the National Aerospace Development Administration, the Ministry of Atomic Energy Industry, the Munitions Industry Department, the Reconnaissance General Bureau, and Office No. 39.

Furthermore, members of the international community, including South Korea, Japan, and the European Union, began to impose independent embargoes on North Korea, trying to fill gaps in the current sanctions. South Korea's Ministry of Foreign Affairs said on April 5, 2016, about a month after the adoption of the resolution, that "There has been visible progress on various fronts, such as the ban on port entry of the sanctioned vessels of Offshore Marine Management (OMM), registration cancellation of UN members' vessels carrying the North Korean flag of convenience, enhanced inspection of North Korean cargo, expulsion of North Koreans involved in illicit activities, and cancellation of teaching or training of North Koreans."

Yonhap News Agency of South Korea reported on April 3, 2016, a month after the adoption of Resolution 2270, that the effects of sanctions were being detected in North Korea as seen in the soaring market prices and the food shortage affecting even members of the National Security Agency.

The sanctions of the resolution, if faithfully implemented by member states, are expected to deal a severe blow against the illicit arms smuggling and also the foreign currency earnings of the North Korean regime, forcing the regime onto the path of change.

== North Korea's response ==
Spokespersons of the North Korean government and the Minister of Foreign Affairs announced statements on March 4, 2016, about 40 hours after the adoption of Resolution 2270, in North Korea's first response to the adoption, which read "North Korea flatly rejects the UN Security Council Resolution 2270 and will take countermeasures."

One day prior, North Korean supreme leader Kim Jong-un said, "We need to get the nuclear warheads deployed for national defense always on standby so as to be fired any moment."

He visited Wonsan, a naval base in Kangwon Province and watched the firing of six rounds of a new multiple rocket launcher on the day of the adoption of the resolution in an apparent show of power.

On the same day, Kim Jong-un said, "Now is the time for us to convert our mode of military counteraction toward the enemies into one of pre-emptive attack in every aspect," while he denounced the resolution and the joint US-South Korea military exercise scheduled to take place from March 7 and also slammed South Korean President Park Geun-hye by name.

On April 3, a month after the adoption of the resolution, North Korea delivered more threatening messages through its state agencies and channels. Korean Central Television, for instance, reported "North Korea condemns the vicious resolution of the UN Security Council as the most heinous provocation against our Republic, which is a dignified sovereign state, and flatly opposes the resolution."

Demanding an apology from the South Korean president, North Korea also threatened an attack on the Blue House (the presidential residence of South Korea) by saying, "This will be the last opportunity for the Blue House and the reactionary ruling institutions, which are the cradles of evil, to avoid the punishment of a fiery baptism."

In response to joint US-South Korea military drills, North Korea even posed a military threat of "Seoul liberation operation". Meanwhile, North Korea continued its provocations that have raised tensions on the Korean Peninsula, such as the firing of a new multiple rocket launcher, short- and mid-range ballistic missiles and surface-to-air missiles, the attempts to jam GPS signals of South Korea, and the testing of a new surface-to-air guided missile system.

== See also ==
- List of United Nations Security Council resolutions concerning North Korea
