= United Nations Security Council Resolution 2397 =

United Nations Security Council resolution

UN Security Council Resolution 2397
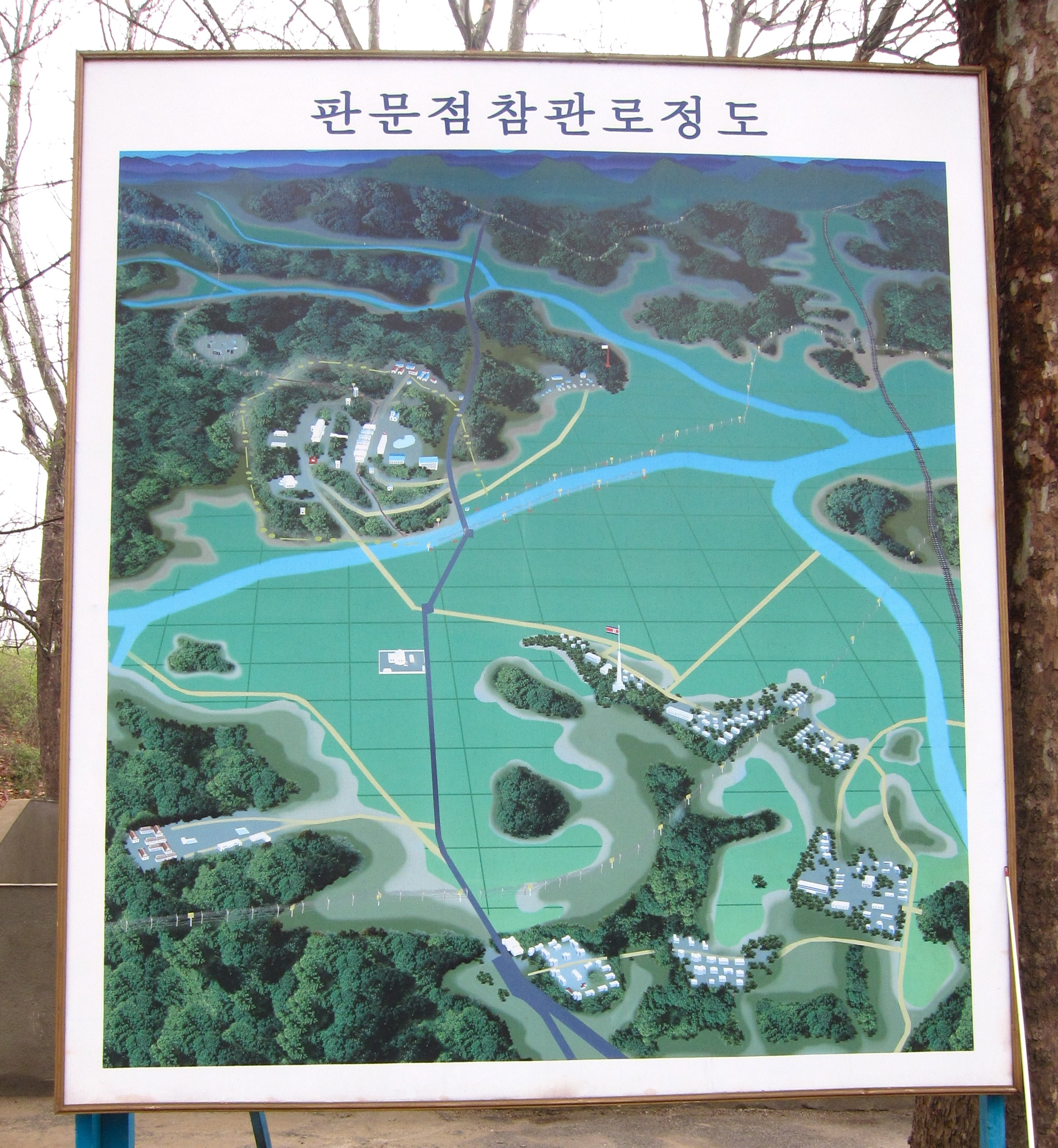
- Korean DMZ map
- Date: 22 December 2017
- Meeting no.: 8151
- Code: S/RES/2397 (Document)
- Subject: Nuclear non-proliferation
- Voting summary: 15 voted for; None voted against; None abstained
- Result: Adopted

Security Council composition
- Permanent members: China; France; Russia; United Kingdom; United States
- Non-permanent members: Bolivia; Egypt; Ethiopia; Italy; Japan; Kazakhstan; Senegal; Sweden; Ukraine; Uruguay

United Nations Security Council Resolution 2397 is a resolution adopted unanimously on 22 December 2017 in response to North Korea's launch of a Hwasong-15 intercontinental ballistic missile on 28 November of that year. The resolution condemned the launch and further tightened sanctions on the country, restricting fuel imports and other trade, as well as the ability of North Korean citizens to work abroad. On 24 December, the North Korean Ministry of Foreign Affairs stated that the resolution constitutes an act of war.

== Provisions ==
The resolution has several provisions. It limits the North Korean import of refined petroleum to 500,000 barrels for each 12-month period, starting on 1 January 2018. A ban was also imposed on the export of food, machinery, electrical equipment, earth and stones, wood and vessels from North Korea, and export of industrial equipment, machinery, transportation vehicles and industrial metals to it. Asset freezes were imposed on the North Korean Ministry of People's Armed Forces and banking officials. The UN member states were authorized to "seize, inspect, freeze and impound any vessel in their territorial waters" found to illicitly supply petroleum to North Korea.

The resolution also called for the return of all North Korean nationals earning income abroad, with some humanitarian exceptions, within 24 months.

== Voting rationales ==
US Ambassador to the United Nations Nikki Haley said that the launch "was an unprecedented violation which required an unprecedented response" and that "further defiance would result in further isolation". Permanent Representative of France François Delattre called the resolution "a significant step in bolstering action against the provocations" of North Korea. Permanent Representative of Egypt Amr Abdellatif Aboulatta said that he had voted in favour of the resolution "to maintain the credibility of the Treaty on the Non-Proliferation of Nuclear Weapons, which must be binding without discrimination or distinction". Permanent Representative of Kazakhstan to the United Nations Kairat Umarov said that "the temporary nature of the sanctions must be stressed in order for the measures to have their desired result of bringing about talks".

== North Korean reaction ==
On 24 December 2017, the North Korean Ministry of Foreign Affairs issued a statement saying that the resolution "is tantamount to complete economic blockade of the DPRK". The statement defined the resolution "as a grave infringement upon the sovereignty" of North Korea and "an act of war violating peace and stability in the Korean peninsula and the region". According to the statement, the nuclear weapons serve "self-defensive deterrence that does not contradict any international law" since they were developed "in a fair and legitimate way outside of the Treaty on the Non-Proliferation of Nuclear Weapons in order to put an end to the hostile policy and nuclear threats and blackmail of the U.S."
