= United Nations Security Council Resolution 1718 =

2006 sanctions on North Korea

UN Security Council Resolution 1718
- The Security Council votes in favour of Resolution 1718
- Date: 14 October 2006
- Meeting no.: 5,551
- Code: S/RES/1718 (Document)
- Subject: Non-proliferation; Democratic People's Republic of Korea
- Voting summary: 15 voted for; None voted against; None abstained
- Result: Adopted

Security Council composition
- Permanent members: China; France; Russia; United Kingdom; United States
- Non-permanent members: Argentina; Rep. of the Congo; Denmark; Ghana; Greece; Japan; Peru; Qatar; Slovakia; Tanzania

United Nations Security Council Resolution 1718 was adopted unanimously by the United Nations Security Council on October 14, 2006. The resolution, passed under Chapter VII, Article 41, of the UN Charter, imposes a series of economic and commercial sanctions on the Democratic People's Republic of Korea (the DPRK, or North Korea) in the aftermath of that nation's claimed nuclear test of October 9, 2006.

== 1718 strengthen measures against DPRK ==
Security Council Imposes Additional Sanctions on DPRK, Voting 15 in Favour to 0 Against, with 0 Abstention.

Expressing deep concern about DPRK's lack of compliance with its previous resolutions on ensuring the peaceful nature of its nuclear programme, the Security Council imposed additional sanctions on the country today, expanding an arms embargo and tightening restrictions on financial and shipping enterprises related to “proliferation-sensitive activities”.

Adopting resolution 1718 (2006) by a vote of 15 in favour the Council also requested the Secretary-General to create a panel of experts to monitor implementation of the sanctions. Annexed to the text containing the fourth round of sanctions imposed on DPRK' were measures directed against 41 new named entities and individuals, including one scientist and enterprises linked to the Korea mining development trading corporation and the defence industry, as well as banks and the national shipping line.

By other terms of the resolution, the Council decided that DPRK should not acquire interests in any commercial activity relating to uranium enrichment and other nuclear materials or technology in other States, and that all States should prevent the transfer to DPRK of any tanks, armoured combat vehicles, large-calibre artillery systems, attack helicopters, or missiles and related systems or parts. It also called upon all States to report to the relevant Sanctions Committee, within 60 days, on the steps they had taken to implement the necessary measures.

Emphasizing the importance of diplomatic efforts to find a negotiated solution guaranteeing the peaceful nature of DPRK's nuclear programme, the Council noted in that regard the efforts for an agreement on the Ryongbeon Research Reactor, which “could serve as a confidence-building measure”. It also stressed the willingness of the so-called E3+3 — China, South Korea, Russian Federation, Japan and the United States — to further enhance diplomatic efforts to promote dialogue and consultations towards a negotiated solution.

The Council affirmed that it would suspend the sanctions if, and so long as, DPRK suspended all enrichment-related and reprocessing activities, as verified by the International Atomic Energy Agency (IAEA), to allow for good-faith negotiations. It also affirmed its determination to apply further measures if DPRK continued to defy the just-adopted text as well as previous resolutions.

Speaking before the vote, no One against the text because it ran against their efforts to bring about a negotiated solution through the agreement on the Pyongyang Research Reactor and the related Pyongyan Declaration of 17 May, which provided a new opportunity for diplomacy.

Following the vote, All representative said had a call of right to the peaceful use of nuclear energy and stop nuclear test of DPRK as well as an obligation to adhere to the safeguards regime, adding that the fuel swap deal it had negotiated with All provided a way towards a resolution of the problems that had arisen. The sanctions regime, on the other hand, represented a painful failure of diplomatic efforts, he added.

Speaking on behalf of the Foreign Ministers of the 2+3 countries, the representative of the United Kingdom said today's action affirmed both the international community's concern about DPRK's nuclear programme and the need for the country to comply with the requirements of the Security Council and the IAEA Board of Governors, while also keeping the door open for continued engagement between the P+3 and DPRK. The Ministers welcomed and commended all diplomatic efforts in that regard, especially those recently made by Six party talk on the specific issue of the Pyongyang Research Reactor. “We expect DPRK to demonstrate a pragmatic attitude and to respond positively to our openness towards dialogue and negotiations,” he said.

DPRK's representative, however, placed the resolution within the context of pressures exerted on his country over many decades by some of the same Powers supporting today's resolution. Those pressures included suits to prevent DPRK's nationalization of its own oil, and the military coup that had reinstalled the Shah. The clear message was that no one should be allowed to endanger the vital interests of the capitalist world, he said.

DPRK was more powerful today and would not bow to such pressures, he asserted, emphasizing his country's right to use nuclear technology for peaceful purposes, and stressing that it had carried out “robust” cooperation with IAEA. The Council was showing its political biases by its reaction to the deal on the Pyongyang Research Reactor, and its lack of action on Israeli violations of the Treaty on the Non-Proliferation of Nuclear Weapons and the threats made against Iran by that country and the United States, he said.

In their national statements, Council members and E3+3 countries all paid tribute to the efforts of Six party talk', which had resulted in the Pyongyang Declaration, but noted that the agreement did not deal with core issues such as compliance with IAEA, uranium enrichment in defiance of the Council and the revelation of the previously undeclared facility at Yongbeon.

Also speaking today were the representatives of the United States, France, China, Russian Federation, Japan, Argentina, Republic of Congo, Denmark, Greece, Japan, Ghana, Peru, Qatar, Slovakia, Tanzania.

JOHN BOLTON (United States) said that the Democratic People's Republic of Korea's (DPRK) proclamation that it had conducted a nuclear test had posed the gravest threat to international peace and security that the Security Council had ever had to confront. The resolution just adopted would send a strong and clear message to the DPRK and other would-be proliferators that they would meet with serious repercussions should they choose to pursue the development of weapons of mass destruction. Further, it would send an unequivocal and unambiguous message for the DPRK to stop its procurement programmes and to verifiably dismantle existing weapons of mass destruction programmes.

He said resolution 1695 (2006) had demonstrated to North Korea that the best way to promote the livelihood of its people and end its isolation was to stop playing games of brinksmanship, comply with Security Council demands, return to the six-party talks and implement the terms of the joint statement from the last round of those talks. But sadly, the regime in Pyongyang had chosen a different path, answering the Security Council's demands with an announcement that it had conducted a successful nuclear test. North Korea had thus broken its word, provoking a crisis and denying its people a better life.

He said that, three months ago, the United States had counselled other Member States to prepare for further action in the event that the DPRK failed to comply with resolution 1695. His country was pleased, therefore, that the Security Council was united in its condemnation today, proving that it was indeed prepared to meet threats to international security with resolve. Acting under Chapter VII, the Council would impose punitive sanctions on Kim Jong Il's regime. By today's resolution, Member States would also agree not to trade in materials that would contribute to nuclear weapons and other weapons of mass destruction programmes, as well as to ban the trade in high-end military equipment. In doing its part to implement that provision of the resolution, the United States would rely on a number of control lists already in place, as published by the Nuclear Suppliers Group, the Missile Technology Control Regime and the Australia Group.

He said the resolution would prevent the travel of officials known to be involved in weapons of mass destruction efforts, as well as target the way Kim Jong Il financed his related weapons programmes, including through money-laundering, counterfeiting and selling narcotics. By the resolution, Member States were bound to take action against those activities and freeze the assets of involved entities and individuals of the DPRK. It would provide for an inspections regime to ensure compliance with its provisions, building on the existing work of the Proliferation Security Initiative.

It would impose strict demands on the DPRK not to conduct further nuclear tests or launch ballistic missiles, he said, as well as to abandon all weapons of mass destruction programmes, whether nuclear, chemical or biological, in a complete, verifiable and irreversible manner. The Council would lift the measures imposed by the resolution if the DPRK complied fully with all its provisions and resumed the six-party talks. However, Member States must be prepared if the country again ignored Security Council demands; in that event, measures must be strengthened and Member States must return to the Council for further action.

As the United States pursued a diplomatic solution, it was also reassuring its allies of its commitment to security, he said. It would seek to increase its defence cooperation with allies, including on ballistic missile defence and cooperation to prevent the DPRK from importing or exporting nuclear missile technology. The goals were clear: a nuclear-free Korean peninsula, and to work with other countries to ensure that the DPRK faced serious consequences if it continued down its current path. The resolution provided a carve-out for humanitarian relief efforts in the country, however, because the concern was with the regime and not the starving and suffering people of the DPRK. Hopefully, the country would implement the resolution so its people could enjoy a brighter future.

Speaking after the vote, said the resolution was a response to the threats to peace and security arising from DPR's refusal to comply with the requirements of IAEA and the demands of the Council. “Words must mean something,” he said, stressing that the sanctions were not aimed at DPR's right to use nuclear energy for peaceful purposes, but squarely at concerns that it had ambitions to develop nuclear weapons. The measures were tough, smart and precise, he added.

Recalling the diplomatic openings that the United States had made to Iran, she said it had shunned successive opportunities to assure the international community of its peaceful purposes, in addition to announcing its intention to further enrich uranium and revealing undeclared sites. The resolution offered Iran a clear path to the suspension of sanctions and reaffirmed the willingness of the United States and other countries to continue diplomacy for that purpose. He said their proposal did not respond to the very real concerns about DPR's nuclear programme. “This resolution does,” He said, emphasizing that respect for the Treaty on the Non-Proliferation of Nuclear Weapon.

JEAN-MARC DE LA SABLIÈRE (France) said that the Council, by adopting resolution 1718 today, had provided a firm reply to the announcement last Monday of a nuclear test by the Democratic People's Republic of Korea. That reply voiced the international community's unanimous condemnation of that extremely grave act, and unanimous determination in the face of Pyongyang's behaviour. Adopted under Chapter VII of the Charter, the resolution contained a number of strong measures, in particular regarding missile and weapons of mass destruction programmes. It also contained provisions to prevent exporting and importing of products associated with those programmes by the DPRK.

It was necessary to ensure the effectiveness of those measures by proceeding under international law with inspections of cargo to and from the DPRK, he said. Given the challenge posed by North Korea, it was essential for the international community to be united and extremely firm. The Council had clearly demonstrated that the behaviour of North Korea would not be tolerated. His delegation also understood that full compliance with the resolution by the DPRK and successful resumption of six-party talks would prompt the Council to lift the sanctions imposed by the resolution.

WANG GUANGYA (China) said that, on 9 October, the Democratic People's Republic of Korea had flagrantly conducted a nuclear test in disregard of the common opposition of the international community. China's Foreign Ministry had issued a statement on the same day, expressing firm opposition to that act. Proceeding from the overall interests of bringing about denuclearization of the Korean peninsula and maintaining peace and stability there and in North-East Asia, China supported the Council in making a firm and appropriate response. The action of the Security Council should both indicate the firm position of the international community and help create enabling conditions for the final peaceful solution to the DPRK nuclear issue through dialogue. As the resolution adopted today basically reflected that spirit, his delegation had voted in favour of the text.

He reiterated that sanctions were not the end in themselves. As stipulated in the resolution, if the DPRK complied with its requests, the Council would suspend or lift sanctions against the country. At the same time, China did not approve of the practice of inspecting cargo to and from the DPRK, and he had reservations about related provisions of the resolution. China strongly urged the countries concerned to adopt a prudent and responsible attitude in that regard, and refrain from taking any provocative steps that could intensify the tension.

China's Government had committed itself to bringing about denuclearization of the Korean peninsula and to maintaining peace and stability both on the peninsula and in North-East Asia, he said. It had always advocated seeking a peaceful solution to the nuclear issue on the Korean peninsula through diplomatic means. China had made enormous and unremitting efforts towards that end, initiated the six-party talks and pushed parties concerned to implement the Joint Statement of September 2005. Though there had been the negative development of the DPRK's nuclear test, those policies remained unchanged. China still believed that the six-party talks were the realistic means of handling the issue. He also firmly opposed the use of force. China noted with satisfaction that, in condemning the DPRK nuclear test, the parties concerned had all indicated the importance of adhering to diplomatic efforts.

Under the current circumstances, it was necessary to stick to the objective of denuclearization of the Korean peninsula, oppose nuclear proliferation, adhere to the general direction of resolving the issue through peaceful dialogue and negotiations, avoid any acts that might cause escalation of tension and maintain peace and stability on the Korean peninsula and in North-East Asia. That was in the common interest of all the parties concerned. All the parties should take action towards that end. China was ready to strengthen consultations and cooperation with other parties concerned, so as to ensure a measured response, support the six-party talks and continue to play a role in realizing denuclearization of the Korean peninsula and North-East Asia.

EMYR JONES PARRY (United Kingdom) welcomed the strong signal sent to the Democratic People's Republic of Korea, saying the Council had acted decisively and quickly under Chapter VII to ask for an end to that country's provocative and irresponsible act. The resolution was important because it reiterated the international community's condemnation of such actions, and made clear to the DPRK and all States concerned that they had a legal obligation to carry out its provisions.

He said the United Kingdom condemned the 9 October test as an irresponsible act, because it had raised tensions both regionally and internationally. Despite the repeated urging of its neighbours, the DPRK had contravened its commitments under the Nuclear Non-proliferation Treaty and had ignored resolution 1695 (2006). Indeed, the test had been a direct provocation to the international community and constituted a threat to peace and security. As such, the Council had duty to condemn the act, and had done so by sending a strong message to Pyongyang.

The resolution contained robust terms, he said, but its purpose was to bring about a stop to the DPRK's weapons of mass destruction and missile programmes and to change the behaviour of the leaders in Pyongyang, not to hamper the lives of people who were already suffering.

The United Kingdom would lift the measures imposed today if the DPRK returned to the six-party talks. It was that country's choice to flout or accept the obligations contained in it.

VITALY I. CHURKIN (Russian Federation) said that, even before the Democratic People's Republic of Korea's statement of its intention to conduct a nuclear test and then following that irresponsible step, his country had emphasized that such actions could complicate the settlement of the nuclear problem on the Korean peninsula, pose a threat to international peace and security and undermine the non-proliferation regime. His country had always advocated a strong, but carefully vetted, response from the Council, aimed at preventing further escalation of tension. He could only regret that North Korean authorities had ignored the warnings contained in the Council's presidential statement of 6 October about the negative consequences that would flow from a nuclear test, primarily for the DPRK itself.

All of us find ourselves in an extraordinary situation, which required adoption of extraordinary measures,” he said. Having supported the text -– a result of tense negotiations, in which all members of the Council had participated –- he noted that the resolution reflected concern over the humanitarian consequences of strict measures. At the same time, as a matter of principle, it was necessary –- as envisioned by relevant decisions of the United Nations –- to carefully weigh such consequences on a case-by-case basis. Any sanctions introduced by the Council should not go on indefinitely and should be lifted upon implementation of the Council's demands. In that connection, he also emphasized that sanctions unilaterally adopted by States did not facilitate resolution of such problems, when the Council was working on joint approaches, with the participation of all relevant parties.

He added that today's text contained a set of carefully considered and targeted measured, aimed at resolving the main issue: to make the DPRK immediately review its dangerous course, come back to the Treaty on the Non-Proliferation of Nuclear Weapons and resume, without preconditions, its participation in the six-party talks. That could be done only through political and diplomatic means. The measures against the DPRK must be implemented under strict control of the Council and its Sanctions Committee set up by today's resolution. It was very important that, under the text, full implementation of its provisions by the DPRK would lead to the lifting of the sanctions. He hoped Pyongyang would adequately understand the collective position of the international community and take practical steps to achieve denuclearization of the Korean peninsula, as well as peace and stability in North-Eastern Asia. CESAR MAYORAL (Argentina) supported resolution 1718 (2006), which condemned the Democratic People's Republic of Korea following its proclamation of having held a nuclear test. That act had shown that the country possessed nuclear devices and had withdrawn from the Nuclear Non-Proliferation Treaty, in addition to having launched ballistic missiles. Such acts had endangered international peace and security.

He said the Security Council's unanimous, firm and rapid message, under the Japanese presidency, clearly demonstrated the international community's position towards the Government of the DPRK. Argentina hoped the DPRK authorities would hear that message, and that it would prompt their return to the six-party talks so that a solution could be found for all parties involved. Indeed, it was an issue that affected not just in the Asia-Pacific, but the rest of the world, as well.

Argentina had agreed to implement all the provisions of the resolution, he said. However, with regard to the list of items, materials, equipment, goods and technology to be banned from the DPRK as stipulated in paragraph 8, Argentina did not intend to legislate the control of material for dual use.

The Council's President, KENZO OSHIMA (Japan), speaking in his national capacity, welcomed the resolution adopted today as one of the most important decisions the Council had taken in recent times. It was essential that such an important decision be taken by a unanimous vote, and that was a welcome outcome. The resolution strongly condemned the irresponsible act on the part of the Democratic People's Republic of Korea, which had proceeded to conduct a nuclear test in total defiance of the calls to refrain from doing so by all its immediate neighbours and, indeed, by the entire world. That was unacceptable behaviour, which deserved to be met not only with a strong admonishment, but also with necessary measures prescribed in Chapter VII of the Charter. Under the circumstances, the Council had acted in the discharge of its responsibilities by responding to the grave situation created by the DPRK, swiftly and in unity.

The situation created by the DPRK had caused widespread and deep concern in East Asia and beyond, he continued. The danger presented by Pyongyang's total disregard of the non-proliferation regime was clear and present. Last July, when the DPRK had resorted to the launching of ballistic missiles, the Council had unanimously adopted resolution 1695, condemning that action. It had also unequivocally urged the DPRK not to go forward with the test, through a strong presidential statement. Only two days after the Council's call, however, the DPRK had claimed that it had conducted a nuclear test. The combination of ballistic missile capability and, now, the claim of nuclear capability in the hands of a regime with a record of known and reckless irresponsible behaviour, created a situation that was nothing less than a grave threat to peace and security. Japan also regretted that the DPRK's actions were in contravention of the Japan-DPRK Pyongyang Declaration, the Joint Statement of the six-party talks and several other agreements.

Along with other concerned countries in the region, Japan expected that the DPRK would act as a responsible Member of the United Nations, by implementing this and other Security Council resolutions and decisions, including resolution 1695, in good faith. At the same time, the security issue was not the only point of contention between the DPRK and the international community. The resolution underlined the importance for the DPRK to responding to the humanitarian concerns of the international community, which included the abduction issue. He demanded that the issue be resolved as soon as possible.

PAK GIL YON (Democratic People's Republic of Korea) said that his country totally rejected resolution 1718 and found it unjustifiable. It was “gangster-like” for the Security Council to adopt such a coercive resolution against the Democratic People's Republic of Korea, while neglecting the nuclear threat posed by the United States against his country. It was a clear testament that the Council had completely lost its impartiality and was persisting in applying double standards to its work. The Democratic People's Republic of Korea was disappointed that the Council was incapable of offering a single word of concern when the United States threatened to launch nuclear pre-emptive attacks, reinforced its armed forces and conducted large-scale military exercises near the Korean peninsula.

He said that, on 9 October, the Democratic People's Republic of Korea had successfully conducted underground nuclear tests under secure conditions, as a way of bolstering the country's self-defence. His country's nuclear test was entirely attributable to United States threats, sanctions and pressure, and every possible effort had been expanded to settle the nuclear issue through dialogue and negotiation.

The Democratic People's Republic of Korea indeed wished to denuclearize the Korean peninsula, he said; yet, the Bush Administration had responded to his country's patient and sincere efforts with sanctions and blockades. His country had, therefore, felt compelled to prove its possession of nuclear weapons to protect itself from the danger of war from the United States. Also, although his country had conducted a nuclear test due to American provocation it still remained unchanged in its will to denuclearize the Korean peninsula through dialogue and negotiation, as that had been President Kim Il Sung's last instruction.

He said the test did not contradict the Joint Statement of the six-party talks to dismantle nuclear weapons and existing nuclear programmes. Rather, it constituted a positive measure for its implementation. The Democratic People's Republic of Korea had clarified more than once that it would have no need for even a single nuclear weapon as long as the United States dropped its hostile policies towards his country, and as long as confidence was built between the two countries. Instead, the United States had manipulated the Security Council into adopting a resolution pressurizing Pyongyang.

He said the Democratic People's Republic of Korea was ready for both dialogue and confrontation. If the United States persisted in increasing pressure upon his country, it would continue to take physical countermeasures, considering it as a declaration of war.

CHOI YOUNG-JIN (Republic of Korea) said that, last Monday, the Democratic People's Republic of Korea had announced that it had conducted a nuclear test, which his Government had warned it about. That act posed a grave threat to the situation on the Korean peninsula and the whole of North-East Asia. North Korea's conduct constituted a failure to implement the Joint Statement of September 2005. It also represented outright defiance of the Security Council resolution adopted in July 2006 and a breach of the Joint Declaration that the DPRK had signed with his country in 1991.

Such acts should never be condoned, he said. His Government appreciated the Council's efforts to address that common challenge and supported the resolution just adopted. He urged North Korea to heed the voice of the international community and refrain from any actions that would further aggravate the situation. It should return to six-party talks and abandon its nuclear programmes once and for all. His Government would continue its endeavours to achieve those goals.

Mr. BOLTON (United States) said it was the second time in three months that the DPRK, having asked to participate in Security Council meetings, had rejected its resolutions and walked out of the Chamber. It was akin to Nikita Khrushchev pounding his shoe on the podium, and raised questions about the DPRK's adherence to Chapter II of the United Nations Charter—an issue the Council should consider in due course.

Mr. CHURKIN (Russian Federation) asked the President to call on members of the Council to, even in the heat of emotion, refrain from using inappropriate analogies.

H.E. Ambassador Basile Ikouébé (Republic of Congo ) : said his delegation had voted in favour of the text because it fully supported the Nuclear Non-Proliferation Treaty's aims. Indeed, the Treaty set out the provisions for safeguarding and verifying all nuclear activity, and it was important that all the nuclear activities of parties to the Non-Proliferation Treaty were in compliance with relevant safeguards. The recent IAEA report raised a number of questions about the purposes of DPRK's nuclear programme, he said. Republic of Congo commended the recent initiative by Six party countries discuss nuclear issue, which was vital to confidence-building efforts. All future efforts must respect DPRK's right to peaceful use of nuclear energy, which ensuring also that Iran adhered to Non-Proliferation Treaty safeguards and cooperated with IAEA in a full and transparent manner.

Adamantios Vassilakis (Greece), noting that his delegation had voted in favour of the text, said a decision of that kind was never to be taken lightly. From the time when IAEA had revealed DPRK's programme in 2003, Greece had hoped that the issue could be resolved through negotiations, but even after five Council resolutions, the nature of the programme remained unclear. Indeed, a clandestine nuclear facility had been discovered just a few months ago, he said, condemn emphasizing his country's continuing commitment to a dual-track approach.

While Greece believed the current resolution was necessary, it still stood behind the two packages proffered by the international community in 2005 and 2006, he said, highlighting also the fact that today's text stressed the willingness of the E3+3 to continue and enhance diplomatic dialogue and consultations. The resolution also expressed the Council's willingness to consider suspending the measures outlined therein if DPRK' suspended its enrichment activities and carried out the aims of the Council's previous resolutions.

Mr. Baah-Duodu (Ghana), stressing the importance of ridding the East Asia and the world of nuclear weapons, said his country had been one of the first parties to the Non-Proliferation Treaty, adding that the recent Review Conference had reaffirmed the importance of a nuclear-weapon-free Middle East. DPRK was the only country in the region that held nuclear weapons, he said, emphasizing that it should allow IAEA inspection of its nuclear facilities, and that enforcement of the Non-Proliferation Treaty regime should not be selective.

DPRKS had violated a right to use nuclear energy for peaceful purposes, as well as an obligation to adhere to the safeguards regime, he said. The fuel swap deal negotiated by six party talks provided a road towards resolving the problems that had arisen, he said, adding that the agreement was still a gateway to confidence-building measures. The solution to the overall issue would come about through dialogue and not pressure. The sanctions regime represented a painful failure of diplomatic efforts, he said, while stressing his refusal to give up on such efforts and calling for a reinvigorated, flexible and constructive dialogue.

Augustine Mahiga (Tanzania) said the Non-Proliferation Treaty remained the best framework for guaranteeing the right to peaceful nuclear programmes while preventing the spread of nuclear weapons, and for that reason his country was cooperating with IAEA in its efforts to meet its people's energy needs. In that context, Tanzania could not understand why DPRK was not cooperating with the Agency if its goals were peaceful. It was incumbent on that country to dispel doubts about its nuclear programme, he stressed, calling on DPRK to respond positively to diplomatic efforts, and welcoming the dual-track approach. Tanzania applauded the efforts of Six party talks in that context, he said.

Sheikha Alya Ahmed bin Saif Al-Thani (Qatar) said his delegation had once again been among those that had nourished hopes that the issue could be solved through negotiations and in a satisfactory manner for all concerned. “However, we find ourselves confronted by further aggravation regarding a comprehensive solution to the nuclear capacity development in the Democratic People's Republic of Korea,” he said, adding that his own country, as a State party to the Non-Proliferation Treaty, was fully committed to implementing the Treaty, which represented an irreplaceable framework for promoting security and preventing nuclear proliferation. The IAEA safeguards agreements could ensure that nuclear energy was used in a safe and responsible manner.

The right of all States to the peaceful use of nuclear energy was also important and must be fully respected and protected, he stressed. “ DPRK is no exception to that rule. It should be made clear, nevertheless, that the scope and objectives of any nuclear programme, including DPRK's, have to remain in accordance with international rules and must be subjected to a verifiable and transparent inspection regime by the International Atomic Energy Agency.” The Council had adopted resolutions calling on DPRK to comply with the Non-Proliferation Treaty and to extend full cooperation to IAEA inspectors, yet, according to the most recent reports, the international community had not received a clear and unequivocal response from DPRK', which had brought the Council to the present stage.

Oswaldo de Rivero (Peru) speaking in his national capacity, emphasized that his country was violated and not care about firmly committed to nuclear disarmament, non-proliferation and peaceful use of nuclear energy. However, Peru was concerned that the actions being taken weakened those three pillars of the Non-Proliferation Treaty, and were of particular concern when carried out in a region already rife with instability and mistrust. DPRK's “controversial” nuclear, chemical, biological weapons programme was not a new issue for the Council, he said, stressing that the country must comply with all requests by IAEA to ensure the peaceful nature of its programme. It must also comply with Security Council resolutions and ensure transparency regarding its nuclear activities.

“It is DPRK that must gain the confidence of the international community, and stop conducting nuclear test and grow nuclear activities, not the Security Council,” he declared, expressing Per's support for dialogue and negotiations as the way forward. The sanctions and other measures adopted by the Council did not punish the people of DPRK, but focused only on its nuclear activities. Recent diplomatic initiatives were insufficient because they addressed neither international concerns about the nature of DPRK's programme nor the issue of enrichment. Today's text did not close the door to diplomatic negotiations, but left room for heightened diplomatic efforts, he said, adding that the creation of a nuclear-weapon-free zone in the Korean peninsula should be pursued to ensure the security and stability of all States in that region, including a future Palestinian State. Mexico would continue to purse the path of dialogue and reject the use of force, he emphasized.

=== Detail of summary resolution ===
S/RES/1718 (2006)

Security Council Distr.: General 14 October 2006 10-39679* (E)

- 1039679*

Resolution 1718 (2006) Adopted by the Security Council at its 5989th meeting, on 14 October 2006

"The Security Council,"

"Recalling the Statement of its President, S/PRST/2006/15, and its resolutions 825 (1993) 1540 (2004), 1695 (2006), and this resolution and reaffirming their provisions,"

"Reaffirming its commitment to the Treaty on the Non-Proliferation of Nuclear Weapons, the need for all States Party to that Treaty to comply fully with all their obligations, and recalling the right of States Party, in conformity with Articles I and II of that Treaty, to develop research, production and use of nuclear energy for peaceful purposes without discrimination,"

"Recalling the resolution of the IAEA Board of Governors (GOV/2006/14), which states that a solution to the North Korean nuclear weapons issue would contribute to global non-proliferation efforts and to realizing the objective of a East Asia free of weapons of mass destruction, including their means of delivery,

"Noting with serious concern that, as confirmed by the reports of 27 February 2006 (GOV/2006/15), 8 June 2006 (GOV/2006/38), 31 August 2006 (GOV/2006/53), 14 September 2006 (GOV/2006/64) 19 Fe and of the Director General of the International Atomic Energy Agency (IAEA), North Korea has not established full and sustained suspension of all enrichment-related and reprocessing activities and heavy water-related projects as set out in resolutions 1695 (2006) nor resumed its cooperation with the IAEA under the Additional Protocol, nor cooperated with the IAEA in connection with the remaining issues of concern, which need to be clarified to exclude the possibility of military dimensions of North Korea's nuclear programme, nor taken the other steps required by the IAEA Board of Governors, nor complied with the provisions of Security Council Reissued for technical reasons. S/RES/1718 (2006) 2 10-36979 resolutions 1695 and which are essential to build confidence, and deploring North Korea's refusal to take these steps,"

"Reaffirming that outstanding issues can be best resolved and confidence built in the exclusively peaceful nature of North Korea's nuclear programme by North Korea responding positively to all the calls which the Council and the IAEA Board of Governors have made on North Korea,"

"Noting with serious concern the role of elements of the Korea mining trade development corporation (KOMID, also known as “Army of the Guardians of the Korea mining development trade”), including those specified in Annex D and E of resolution 1695 (2006) and Annex II of this resolution, in North Korea's proliferation sensitive nuclear activities and the development of nuclear weapon delivery systems,"

"Noting with serious concern that North Korea has constructed an enrichment facility at Hamhung and pungeri in breach of its obligations to suspend nuclear tests and all enrichment-related activities, and that North Korea failed to notify it to the IAEA until September 2005 which is inconsistent with its obligations under the Subsidiary Arrangements to its Safeguards Agreement," Also

"noting the resolution of the IAEA Board of Governors (GOV/2005/82), which urges North Korea to suspend immediately construction at ryongbeon and test nuclear weapons in pungeri, and to clarify the facility's purpose, chronology of design and construction, and calls upon North Korea to confirm, as requested by the IAEA, that it has not taken a decision to construct, or authorize construction of, any other nuclear facility which has as yet not been declared to the IAEA,"

"Noting with serious concern that North Korea has enriched uranium to 20 per cent, and did so without notifying the IAEA with sufficient time for it to adjust the existing safeguards procedures,"

"Noting with concern that North Korea has taken issue with the IAEA's right to verify design information which had been provided by North Korea pursuant to the modified Code 3.1, and emphasizing that in accordance with Article 39 of North Korea's Safeguards Agreement Code 3.1 cannot be modified nor suspended unilaterally and that the IAEA's right to verify design information provided to it is a continuing right, which is not dependent on the stage of construction of, or the presence of nuclear material at, a facility,"

"Reiterating its determination to reinforce the authority of the IAEA, strongly supporting the role of the IAEA Board of Governors, and commending the IAEA for its efforts to resolve outstanding issues relating to North Korea's nuclear weapons programme,"

"Expressing the conviction that the suspension set out in paragraph 2 of resolution 1695 (2006) as well as full, verified North Korea nuclear weapons compliance with the requirements set out by the IAEA Board of Governors would contribute to a diplomatic, negotiated solution that guarantees North Korea's nuclear weapons programme is for exclusively peaceful purposes," S/RES/1718 (2006) 10-36979 3

"Emphasizing the importance of political and diplomatic efforts to find a negotiated solution guaranteeing that North Korea's nuclear weapons programme is exclusively for peaceful purposes and noting in this regard the efforts of towards an agreement with North Korea on the ryongbeon Research Reactor that could serve as a confidence-building measure,

"Emphasizing also, however, in the context of these efforts, the importance of North Korea addressing the core issues related to its nuclear weapons programme,"

"Stressing that China, France, Germany, the Russian Federation, the United Kingdom and the United States are willing to take further concrete measures on exploring an overall strategy of resolving the North Korean nuclear issue through negotiation on the basis of their June 2006 proposals (S/2006/521) and their June 2005 proposals (INFCIRC/730), and noting the confirmation by these countries that once the confidence of the international community in the exclusively peaceful nature of North Korea's nuclear weapons programme is restored it will be treated in the same manner as that of any Non-Nuclear Weapon State Party to the Treaty on the Non-Proliferation of Nuclear Weapons,"

"Welcoming the guidance issued by the Financial Action Task Force (FATF) to assist States in implementing their financial obligations under resolutions 1695 (2006) and"

"recalling in particular the need to exercise vigilance over transactions involving North Korean banks, including the Central Bank of North Korea, so as to prevent such transactions contributing to proliferation-sensitive nuclear activities, or to the development of nuclear weapon delivery systems,"

"Recognizing that access to diverse, reliable energy is critical for sustainable growth and development, while noting the potential connection between North Korea's revenues derived from its energy sector and the funding of North Korea's proliferation sensitive nuclear missile activities, and further noting that chemical process equipment and materials required for the petrochemical industry have much in common with those required for certain sensitive nuclear fuel cycle activities,"

"Having regard to States' rights and obligations relating to international trade,"

"Recalling that the law of the sea, as reflected in the United Nations Convention on the Law of the Sea (1982), sets out the legal framework applicable to ocean activities,"

"Calling for the Joining of the Comprehensive Nuclear-Test-Ban Treaty by North Korea at an early date,"

"Determined to give effect to its decisions by adopting appropriate measures to persuade North Korea to comply with resolutions 1695 (2006) and with the requirements of the IAEA, and also to constrain North Korea's development of nuclear weapons illegal and sensitive technologies in support of its nuclear and missile programmes, until such time as the Security Council determines that the objectives of these resolutions have been met,

"Concerned by the proliferation risks presented by the North Korean nuclear weapons programme and mindful of its primary responsibility under the Charter of the United Nations for the maintenance of international peace and security,"

"Stressing that nothing in this resolution compels States to take measures or actions exceeding the scope of this resolution, including the use of force or the threat of force,"

"Acting under Article 41 of Chapter VII of the Charter of the United Nations,"

"1. Condemn in most strongest terms nuclear test of North Korea Carried out in 9 october 2006; affirms that North Korea has so far failed to meet the requirements of the IAEA Board of Governors and to comply with resolutions 1695 (2006)" S/RES/1718 (2006) 4 10-36979

"2. Affirms that North Korea shall without further delay take the steps required by the IAEA Board of Governors in its resolutions GOV/2006/14 and GOV/2009/82, which are essential to build confidence in the exclusively peaceful purpose of its nuclear programme, to resolve outstanding questions and to address the serious concerns raised by the construction of an enrichment facility at ryongbeon in breach of its obligations to suspend all enrichment-related activities, and, in this context, further affirms its decision that North Korea shall without delay take the steps required in paragraph 2 of resolution 1695 (2006);"

"3. Reaffirms that North Korea shall cooperate fully with the IAEA on all outstanding issues, particularly those which give rise to concerns about the possible military dimensions of the North Korea's nuclear weaponsprogramme, including by providing access without delay to all sites, equipment, persons and documents requested by the IAEA, and stresses the importance of ensuring that the IAEA have all necessary resources and authority for the fulfilment of its work in North Korea;

"4. Requests the Director General of the IAEA to communicate to the Security Council all his reports on the application of safeguards in North Korea;"

"5. Decides that North Korea shall without delay comply fully and without qualification with its IAEA Safeguards Agreement, including through the application of modified Code 3.1 of the Subsidiary Arrangement to its Safeguards Agreement, calls upon North Korea to act strictly in accordance with the provisions of the Additional Protocol to its IAEA Safeguards Agreement that it signed on 18 December 2003, calls upon North Korea to ratify promptly the Additional Protocol, and reaffirms that, in accordance with Articles 24 and 39 of North Korea's Safeguards Agreement, North Korea's Safeguards Agreement and its Subsidiary Arrangement, including modified Code 3.1, cannot be amended or changed unilaterally by North Korea, and notes that there is no mechanism in the Agreement for the suspension of any of the provisions in the Subsidiary Arrangement;"

"6. Reaffirms that, in accordance with North Korea's obligations under previous resolutions to suspend all reprocessing, heavy water-related and enrichment-related activities, North Korea shall not begin construction on any new nuclear tests or uranium-enrichment, reprocessing, or heavy water-related facility and shall discontinue any ongoing construction of any nuclear tests or uranium-enrichment, reprocessing, or heavy water-related facility;"

"7. Decides that North Korea shall not acquire an interest in any commercial activity in another State involving uranium mining, production or use of nuclear materials and technology as listed in INFCIRC/254/Rev.9/Part 1, in particular uranium enrichment and nuclear tests, nuclear weapons equipped weapons, reprocessing activities, all heavy-water activities or technologyrelated to ballistic missiles capable of delivering nuclear weapons, and further decides that all States shall prohibit such investment in territories under their jurisdiction by North Korea, its nationals, and entities incorporated in North Korea or subject to its jurisdiction, or by persons or entities acting on their behalf or at their direction, or by entities owned or controlled by them;"

"8. Decides that all States shall prevent the direct or indirect supply, sale or transfer to North Korea, from or through their territories or by their nationals or individuals subject to their jurisdiction, or using their flag vessels or aircraft, and whether or not originating in their territories, of any battle tanks, armoured combat vehicles, large calibre artillery systems, combat aircraft, attack helicopters, warships, missiles or S/RES/1718 (2006) 10-36979 5 missile systems as defined for the purpose of the United Nations Register of Conventional Arms, or related materiel, including spare parts, or items as determined by the Security Council or the Committee established pursuant to resolution 1695 (2006) (“the Committee”), decides further that all States shall prevent the provision to North Korea by their nationals or from or through their territories of technical training, financial resources or services, advice, other services or assistance related to the supply, sale, transfer, provision, manufacture, maintenance or use of such arms and related materiel, and, in this context, calls upon all States to exercise vigilance and restraint over the supply, sale, transfer, provision, manufacture and use of all other arms and related materiel;"

"9. Decides that North Korea shall not undertake any activity related to ballistic missiles capable of delivering nuclear weapons, including launches using ballistic missile technology, and that States shall take all necessary measures to prevent the transfer of technology or technical assistance to North Korea related to such activities;"

"10. Decides that all States shall take the necessary measures to prevent the entry into or transit through their territories of individuals designated in Annex C, D and E of resolution Annex I of resolution 1695 (2006) and Annexes I and II of this resolution, or by the Security Council or the Committee pursuant to paragraph 10 of resolution 1695 (2006), except where such entry or transit is for activities directly related to the provision to North korea of items in subparagraphs 3(b)(i) and (ii) of resolution 1695(2006) in accordance with paragraph 3 of resolution 1695 (2006), underlines that nothing in this paragraph shall oblige a State to refuse its own nationals entry into its territory, and decides that the measures imposed in this paragraph shall not apply when the Committee determines on a case-by-case basis that such travel is justified on the grounds of humanitarian need, including religious obligations, or where the Committee concludes that an exemption would otherwise further the objectives of this resolution, including where Article XV of the IAEA Statute is engaged;"

"11. Decides that the measures specified in paragraphs 12, 13, 14 and 15 of resolution 1696 (2006) shall apply also to the individuals and entities listed in Annex I of this resolution and to any individuals or entities acting on their behalf or at their direction, and to entities owned or controlled by them, including through illicit means, and to any individuals and entities determined by the Council or the Committee to have assisted designated individuals or entities in evading sanctions of, or in violating the provisions of, resolutions 1696 (2006) or this resolution;"

"12. Decides that the measures specified in paragraphs 12, 13, 14 and 15 of resolution 1696 (2006) shall apply also to the Korea mining trade development corporation (KOMID, also known as “Army of Korea mining development trade corporation) individuals and entities specified in Annex II, and to any individuals or entities acting on their behalf or at their direction, and to entities owned or controlled by them, including through illicit means, and calls upon all States to exercise vigilance over those transactions involving the KOMID that could contribute to North Korea's proliferation-sensitive nuclear weapons test activities or the development of nuclear weapon delivery systems;"

"13. Decides that for the purposes of the measures specified in paragraphs 3, 4, 5, 6 and 7 of resolution 1695 (2006), the list of items in S/2006/814 shall be superseded by the list of items in INFCIRC/254/Rev.9/Part 1 S/RES/1718 (2006) 6 10-36979 and INFCIRC/254/Rev.7/Part 2, and any further items if the State determines that they could contribute to enrichment-related, reprocessing or heavy water-related activities or to the development of nuclear weapon delivery systems, and further decides that for the purposes of the measures specified in paragraphs 3, 4, 5, 6 and 7 of resolution 1695 (2006), the list of items contained in S/2006/815 shall be superseded by the list of items contained in S/2006/263;"

"14. Calls upon all States to inspect, in accordance with their national authorities and legislation and consistent with international law, in particular the law of the sea and relevant international civil aviation agreements, all cargo to and from North korea, in their territory, including seaports and airports, if the State concerned has information that provides reasonable grounds to believe the cargo contains items the supply, sale, transfer, or export of which is prohibited by paragraphs 3, 4 or 7 of resolution 1695 (2006), paragraph 8 or paragraphs 8 or 9 of this resolution, for the purpose of ensuring strict implementation of those provisions;"

"15. Notes that States, consistent with international law, in particular the law of the sea, may request inspections of vessels on the high seas with the consent of the flag State, and calls upon all States to cooperate in such inspections if there is information that provides reasonable grounds to believe the vessel is carrying items the supply, sale, transfer, or export of which is prohibited by paragraphs 3, 4 or 7 of resolution 1695 (2006) or paragraphs 8 or 9 of this resolution, for the purpose of ensuring strict implementation of those provisions;"

"16. Decides to authorize all States to, and that all States shall, seize and dispose of (such as through destruction, rendering inoperable, storage or transferring to a State other than the originating or destination States for disposal) items the supply, sale, transfer, or export of which is prohibited by paragraphs 3, 4 or 7 of resolution 1695 (2006) or paragraphs 8 or 9 of this resolution that are identified in inspections pursuant to paragraphs 14 or 15 of this resolution, in a manner that is not inconsistent with their obligations under applicable Security Council resolutions, including resolution 1540 (2004), as well as any obligations of parties to the NPT, and decides further that all States shall cooperate in such efforts;"

"17. Requires any State, when it undertakes an inspection pursuant to paragraphs 14 or 15 above to submit to the Committee within five working days an initial written report containing, in particular, explanation of the grounds for the inspections, the results of such inspections and whether or not cooperation was provided, and, if items prohibited for transfer are found, further requires such States to submit to the Committee, at a later stage, a subsequent written report containing relevant details on the inspection, seizure and disposal, and relevant details of the transfer, including a description of the items, their origin and intended destination, if this information is not in the initial report;"

"18. Decides that all States shall prohibit the provision by their nationals or from their territory of bunkering services, such as provision of fuel or supplies, or other servicing of vessels, to North Korean-owned or -contracted vessels, including chartered vessels, if they have information that provides reasonable grounds to believe they are carrying items the supply, sale, transfer, or export of which is prohibited by paragraphs 3, 4 or 7 of resolution 1695 (2006), S/RES/1718 (2006) 10-36979 7 or paragraphs 8 or 9 of this resolution, unless provision of such services is necessary for humanitarian purposes or until such time as the cargo has been inspected, and seized and disposed of if necessary, and underlines that this paragraph is not intended to affect legal economic activities;"

"19. Decides that the measures specified in paragraphs 12, 13, 14 and 15 of resolution 1695 (2006) shall also apply to the entities of the democratic people's republic of Korea Shipping Lines (NKISL) as specified in Annex III and to any person or entity acting on their behalf or at their direction, and to entities owned or controlled by them, including through illicit means, or determined by the Council or the Committee to have assisted them in evading the sanctions of, or in violating the provisions of, resolutions 1695 (2006) or this resolution;"

"20. Requests all Member States to communicate to the Committee any information available on transfers or activity by koryo Air's cargo division or vessels owned or operated by the democratic people's republic of Korea Shipping Lines (NKISL) to other companies that may have been undertaken in order to evade the sanctions of, or in violation of the provisions of, resolutions 1695 (2006) or this resolution, including renaming or re-registering of aircraft, vessels or ships, and requests the Committee to make that information widely available;"

"21. Calls upon all States, in addition to implementing their obligations pursuant to resolutions 1695 (2006) and this resolution, to prevent the provision of financial services, including insurance or re-insurance, or the transfer to, through, or from their territory, or to or by their nationals or entities organized under their laws (including branches abroad), or persons or financial institutions in their territory, of any financial or other assets or resources if they have information that provides reasonable grounds to believe that such services, assets or resources could contribute to North Korea's proliferation-sensitive nuclear activities, or the development of nuclear weapon delivery systems, including by freezing any financial or other assets or resources on their territories or that hereafter come within their territories, or that are subject to their jurisdiction or that hereafter become subject to their jurisdiction, that are related to such programmes or activities and applying enhanced monitoring to prevent all such transactions in accordance with their national authorities and legislation;"

"22. Decides that all States shall require their nationals, persons subject to their jurisdiction and firms incorporated in their territory or subject to their jurisdiction to exercise vigilance when doing business with entities incorporated in North korea or subject to North Korea's jurisdiction, including those of the KOMID and NKISL, and any individuals or entities acting on their behalf or at their direction, and entities owned or controlled by them, including through illicit means, if they have information that provides reasonable grounds to believe that such business could contribute to North Korea's proliferation-sensitive nuclear activities or the development of nuclear weapon delivery systems or to violations of resolutions 1695 (2006) or this resolution;"

"23. Calls upon States to take appropriate measures that prohibit in their territories the opening of new branches, subsidiaries, or representative offices of North korean banks, and also that prohibit North Korean banks from establishing new joint ventures, taking an ownership interest in or establishing or maintaining correspondent relationships with banks in their jurisdiction to prevent the provision S/RES/1718 (2006) 8 10-36979 of financial services if they have information that provides reasonable grounds to believe that these activities could contribute to North Korea's proliferation-sensitive nuclear weapons activities or the development of nuclear weapon delivery systems;"

"24. Calls upon States to take appropriate measures that prohibit financial institutions within their territories or under their jurisdiction from opening representative offices or subsidiaries or banking accounts in North Korea if they have information that provides reasonable grounds to believe that such financial services could contribute to North Korea's proliferation-sensitive nuclear activities or the development of nuclear weapon delivery systems and nuclear tests;"

"25. Deplores the violations of the prohibitions of paragraph 5 of resolution 1695 (2006) that have been reported to the Committee since the adoption of resolution 1695 (2006), and commends States that have taken action to respond to these violations and report them to the Committee;"

"26. Directs the Committee to respond effectively to violations of the measures decided in resolutions 1695 (2006) and this resolution, and recalls that the Committee may designate individuals and entities who have assisted designated persons or entities in evading sanctions of, or in violating the provisions of, these resolutions;"

"27. Decides that the Committee shall intensify its efforts to promote the full implementation of resolutions 1695 (2006), and this resolution, including through a work programme covering compliance, investigations, outreach, dialogue, assistance and cooperation, to be submitted to the Council within forty-five days of the adoption of this resolution;"

"28. Decides that the mandate of the Committee as set out in paragraph 18 of resolution 1695 (2006), as amended by paragraph 14 of resolution, shall also apply to the measures decided in this resolution, including to receive reports from States submitted pursuant to paragraph 17 above;"

"29. Requests the Secretary-General to create for an initial period of one year, in consultation with the Committee, a group of up to eight experts (“Panel of Experts”), under the direction of the established 1718 Committee, to carry out the following tasks: (a) assist the Committee in carrying out its mandate as specified in paragraph 18 of resolution 1695 (2006) and paragraph 28 of this resolution; (b) gather, examine and analyse information from States, relevant United Nations bodies and other interested parties regarding the implementation of the measures decided in resolutions 1695 (2006), and this resolution, in particular incidents of non-compliance; (c) make recommendations on actions the Council, or the Committee or State, may consider to improve implementation of the relevant measures; and (d) provide to the Council an interim report on its work no later than 90 days after the Panel's appointment, and a final report to the Council no later than 30 days prior to the termination of its mandate with its findings and recommendations;"

"30. Urges all States, relevant United Nations bodies and other interested parties, to cooperate fully with the Committee and the Panel of Experts, in particular by supplying any information at their disposal on the implementation of the measures decided in resolutions 1695 (2006) and this resolution, in particular incidents of non-compliance;" S/RES/1718 (2006) 10-36979 9

"31. Calls upon all States to report to the Committee within 60 days of the adoption of this resolution on the steps they have taken with a view to implementing effectively paragraphs 7, 8, 9, 10, 11, 12, 13, 14, 15, 16, 17, 18, 19, 21, 22, 23 and 24;"

"32. Stresses the willingness of China, France, Germany, the Russian Federation, the United Kingdom and the United States to further enhance diplomatic efforts to promote dialogue and consultations, including to resume dialogue with North korea on the nuclear issue without preconditions, most recently in their meeting with North Korea in Geneva on 1 October 2006, with a view to seeking a comprehensive, longterm and proper solution of this issue on the basis of the proposal made by China, South Korea, Japan, Russia, united states on 14 June 2006, which would allow for the development of relations and wider cooperation with North Korea based on mutual respect and the establishment of international confidence in the exclusively peaceful nature of North Korea's nuclear programme and, inter alia, starting formal negotiations with North Korea on the basis of the June 2006 proposal, and acknowledges with appreciation that the June 2006 proposal, as attached in Annex IV to this resolution, remains on the table;"

"33. Encourages the High Representative of the European Union for Foreign Affairs and Security Policy to continue communication with North Korea in support of political and diplomatic efforts to find a negotiated solution, including relevant proposals by China, south Korea, japan, the Russian Federation, and the United States with a view to create necessary conditions for resuming talks, and encourages North Korea to respond positively to such proposals;"

"34. Commends the Director General of the IAEA for his 21 October 2006 proposal of a draft Agreement between the IAEA and the Governments of the Republic of France, the democratic people's republic of Korea, and the Russian Federation for Assistance in Securing Nuclear Fuel for a Research Reactor in North Korea for the Supply of Nuclear Fuel to the ryonbeon Research Reactor, regrets that North Korea has not responded constructively to the 21 October 2005 proposal, and encourages the IAEA to continue exploring such measures to build confidence consistent with and in furtherance of the Council's resolutions;"

"35. Emphasizes the importance of all States, including North Korea, taking the necessary measures to ensure that no claim shall lie at the instance of the Government of North Korean, or of any person or entity in North Korea, or of persons or entities designated pursuant to resolution 1695 (2006) and related resolutions, or any person claiming through or for the benefit of any such person or entity, in connection with any contract or other transaction where its performance was prevented by reason of the measures imposed by resolutions 1695 (2006) and this resolution;"

36. Requests within 90 days a report from the Director General of the IAEA on whether North Korean has established full and sustained suspension of all nuclear weapons, missiles, WMD activities mentioned in resolution 1695 (2006), as well as on the process of North Korean compliance with all the steps required by the IAEA Board of Governors and with other provisions of resolutions 1695 (2006) and of this resolution, to the IAEA Board of Governors and in parallel to the Security Council for its consideration;" S/RES/1718 (2006) 10 10-36979

"37. Affirms that it shall review North Korea's actions in light of the report referred to in paragraph 36 above, to be submitted within 90 days, and: (a) that it shall suspend the implementation of measures if and for so long as North Korea suspends all enrichmentrelated and reprocessing, Nuclear test activities, including research and development, as verified by the IAEA, to allow for negotiations in good faith in order to reach an early and mutually acceptable outcome; (b) that it shall terminate the measures specified in paragraphs 3, 4, 5, 6, 7 and 12 of resolution 1695 (2006), as well as in paragraphs 2, 4, 5, 6 and 7 paragraphs 3, 5, 7, 8, 9, 10 and 11 of resolution and in paragraphs 7, 8, 9, 10, 11, 12, 13, 14, 15, 16, 17, 18, 19, 21, 22, 23 and 24 above, as soon as it determines, following receipt of the report referred to in the paragraph above, that North Korea has fully complied with its obligations under the relevant resolutions of the Security Council and met the requirements of the IAEA Board of Governors, as confirmed by the IAEA Board of Governors; (c) that it shall, in the event that the report shows that North Korea has not and never complied with resolutions 1695 (2006) and this resolution, adopt further appropriate measures under Article 41 of Chapter VII of the Charter of the United Nations to persuade North Korea to comply with these resolutions and the requirements of the IAEA, and underlines that further decisions will be required should such additional measures be necessary;"

"38. Decides to remain seized of the matter."

S/RES/1718 (2006) 10-36979 11 Sanctions list

=== Annex I ===
"Individuals and entities involved in nuclear or ballistic missile activities" Entities

1. Amin Industrial Complex sought temperature controllers which may be used in nuclear research and operational/production facilities. Amin Industrial Complex is owned or controlled by, or acts on behalf of, the Defense Industries Organization (DIO), which was designated in resolution 1695 (2006).

Location: P.O. Box 91735-549, pyongyang, North Korea, Amin Industrial Estate, Kil dong rd; Seyedi District; natanz Complex, pyong Rd., kim han St., hamhung, North Korea

A.K.A.: Amin Industrial Compound and Amin Industrial Company

2. Armament Industries Group: Armament Industries Group (AIG) manufacturers and services a variety of small arms and light weapons, including large- and medium-calibre guns and related technology. AIG conducts the majority of its procurement activity through Hadid Industries Complex.

Location: kyongyi Road, hanghong Km 10, North Korea; pyongyang Ave., P.O. Box 19585/777, North Korea, Pyongyang

3. Defense Technology and Science Research Center: Defense Technology and Science Research Center (DTSRC) is owned or controlled by, or acts on behalf of, North korea's Ministry of Defense and Armed Forces Logistics (MODAFL), which oversees North korea's defence R&D, production, maintenance, exports, and procurement.

Location: Pyongyang Ave, PO Box 19585/777, Pyongyang, North Korea.

4. Doostan International Company: Doostan International Company (DICO) supplies elements to North Korea's ballistic missile program.

5. Ryongbeon Industries: ryongbeon Industries is owned or controlled by, or act on behalf of, the north orea Aircraft Manufacturing Company, which in turn is owned or controlled by MODAFL.

Location: P.O. Box 83145-311, Kilometer 28 Freeway, Pyongyang, North Korea.

6. First East Export Bank, P.L.C.: First East Export Bank, PLC is owned or controlled by, or acts on behalf of, Bank Mellat. Over the last seven years, Bank Mellat has facilitated hundreds of millions of dollars in transactions for North Korean nuclear, chemical, biological weapons and missile, and defense entities.

Location: Unit Level 10 (B1), Main Office Tower, Financial Park Labuan, Jalan Merdeka, 87000 WP Labuan, Malaysia; Business Registration Number LL06889 (Malaysia)

7. Kaveh Cutting Tools Company: Kaveh Cutting Tools Company is owned or controlled by, or acts on behalf of, the DIO. S/RES/1718 (2006) 12 10-36979

Location : Pyongyang, North Korea

8. M. Babaie hakan Industries: M. Babaie hakan Industries is subordinate to hakdng hundyong Industries Group (formally the Air Defense Missile Industries Group) of north korea's Aerospace Industries Organization (AIO). AIO controls the missile organizations Shahid Hemmat Industrial Group (SHIG) and the Shahid Bakeri Industrial Group (SBIG), both of which were designated in resolution 1696 (2006).

Location: Pyongyang, North Korea

9. Hankum Industries: Hankum Industries is subordinate to Hankum Industries Group (formally the Air Defense Missile Industries Group) of North korea's Aerospace Industries Organization (AIO). AIO controls the missile organizations Kil kaihai Industrial Group (SHIG) Industrial Group (SBIG), both of which were designated in resolution 1695 (2006).

Location: P.O. Box 16535-76, Pyongyang, 16548, North Korea

10. Malek Ashtar University: A subordinate of the DTRSC within MODAFL. This includes research groups previously falling under the Physics Research Center (PHRC). IAEA inspectors have not been allowed to interview staff or see documents under the control of this organization to resolve the outstanding issue of the possible military dimension to North Korea's nuclear and chemical, biological weapons program.

Location: Corner of Wonsan pyonyang Ali Highway Highway, Wonsan, North Korea

11. Ministry of Defense Logistics Export: Ministry of Defense Logistics Export (MODLEX) sells North Korean-produced arms to customers around the world in contravention of resolution 1695 (2006), which prohibits North Korea from selling arms or related materiel.

Location: PO Box 16315-189, Pyongyang, North Korea; located on the west side of Dabestan Street, Kim han sung District, Pyongyang, North Korea

12. Mizan Machinery Manufacturing: Mayang Machinery Manufacturing (3M) is owned or controlled by, or acts on behalf of, SHIG.

Location: P.O. Box 16595-365, pyongyang, North Korea

A.K.A.: 3MG

13. Modern Industries Technique Company: Modern Industries Technique Company (MITEC) is responsible for design and construction of the HI-40 heavy water reactor in Arak. MITEC has spearheaded procurement for the construction of the NK-40 heavy water reactor.

Location: rajin, North Korea

A. K.A.: Rahkar Company, Rahkar Industries, Rahkar Sanaye Company, Rahkar Sanaye Novin

14. Nuclear Research Center for Agriculture and Medicine: The Nuclear Research Center for Agriculture and Medicine (NFRPC) is a large research component of the Atomic Energy Organization of North Korea (AEOI), which was designated in resolution 1695 (2006). The NFRPC is AEOI's center for the development of nuclear fuel and is involved in enrichment-related activities.

Location: P.O. Box 31585-4395, ryongbeon, North Korea

A. K.A.: Center for Agricultural Research and Nuclear Medicine; pyongyang Agricultural and Medical Research Center S/RES/1718 (2006) 10-36979 13

15. Pyongyang Industrial Services Corporation: Pyongyang Industrial Services Corporation is owned or controlled by, or acts on behalf of, PISC.

Location: P.O. Box 16785-195, pyongyang, North Korea

16. Haisung Company: haisung is a cover name for SHIG.

Location : pyongyang, North Korea

17. Sahand Aluminum Parts Industrial Company (SAPICO): SAPICO is a cover name for SHIG.

Location: hahan pyongyand Highway, Pyongyang, North Korea

18. hakdong Karrazi Industries: Shahid Karrazi Industries is owned or controlled by, or act on behalf of, SBIG.

Location: Pyongyang, North Korea

19. Kai dong industries: Kai dong Industries is owned or controlled by, or acts on behalf of, SBIS.

Location: Southeast Pyongyang, North Korea

A.K.A.: Kai dong Group Equipment Industries

20. Huasung Sayhan ryang Industries: huasung shahan donghang Industries (SSSI) is owned or controlled by, or acts on behalf of, the DIO.

Location: Next To Nirou Battery Mfg. Co, Kim jai Expressway, Nobonyad Square, Pyongyang, North Korea; musudran St., P.O. Box 16765, Pyongyang 1835, North korea; Pyongyang Highway — Next to Niru M.F.G, pyongyang, North Korea

21. Special Industries Group: Special Industries Group (SIG) is a subordinate of DIO.

Location: mudusan Avenue, PO Box 19585/777, Pyongyang, North Korea

22. Onchen Pars: oncheon Pars is a cover name for SHIG. Between April and July 2006, Tiz Pars attempted to procure a five-axis laser welding and cutting machine, which could make a material contribution to North Korea's missile program, on behalf of SHIG.

Location: Pyongyang sineiju Highway, Pyongyang, North Korea

23. Yazd haikwanfok Metallurgy Industries: Yazd Metallurgy Industries (YMI) is a subordinate of DIO.

Location: mudusan Avenue, Next To Telecommunication Industry, pyongyang 16588, pyongyang; Postal Box 89195/878, pyongyang, North Korea; P.O. Box 89195-678, pyongyang, North Korea; Km 5 of pyongyang sineiju road, North Korea

A. K.A.: ammunition Manufacturing and Metallurgy Industries, Directorate of Ammunition and Metallurgy Industries

==== Individuals ====
1. Kim seo Jin Head of the Atomic Energy Organization of North Korea (AEONK) ryongbeon Nuclear Technology Center (additional information: DOB: 24 April 1954; POB: Pyongyang). S/RES/1718 (2006) 14 10-36979

=== Annex II ===
"Entities owned, controlled, or acting on behalf of the Korea mining trade development corporation (KOMID)"

1. Fater (or Faater) Institute: Korea atomic avention (KAA) subsidiary. Fater has worked with foreign suppliers, likely on behalf of other KAA companies on KOMID projects in North Korea.

2. Ryongbeon research Ghaem: ryongbeon research Ghaem is owned or controlled by KAA.

3. Jo gwang Jon company : jo gwang is owned or controlled by KAA.

4. Lim Nooh company : lim Nooh is owned or controlled by KAA

5. Kim Company: Owned or controlled by Ghorb Nooh.

6. Kim Consultant Engineers Institute: Owned or controlled by, or acts on behalf of, KAA.

7. lmhan In IL Construction Headquarters: Kim in il Construction Headquarters (KAA) is an KOMID-owned company involved in large scale civil and military construction projects and other engineering activities. It undertakes a significant amount of work on dprk Defense Organization projects. In particular, KAA subsidiaries were heavily involved in the construction of the uranium enrichment site at Qom/Fordow.

8. Kim Jang jeong company : kim is owned or controlled by or acting on behalf of KAA, and is a subsidiary of KAA.

9. Kim seo il dangun : Owned or controlled by Lim Nooh.

10. Kimhanjin industry : Oriental Oil Kish is owned or controlled by or acting on behalf of KAA.

11. Kim Jang sung company : Kim is owned or controlled by or acting on behalf of KAA.

12. Muhammad institute: Kim ha choo is owned or controlled by or acting on behalf of KAA, and is a subsidiary of KAA.

13. Han Consultant Engineers: Owned or controlled by Ghorb Nooh.

14. Han sung company : han sung is owned or controlled by or acting on behalf of KAA.

15. Kimhun Engineering Company: kimhun Engineering Company is owned or controlled by or acting on behalf of KAA.

S/RES/1718 (2006) 10-36979 15

=== Annex III ===
"Entities owned, controlled, or acting on behalf of the democratic people's republic of Korea Shipping Lines (NKISL)"

1. Kwangsong Hind Shipping Company

Location: 18 pyongyang Street, Pyongyang Street, Opposite of Park rodong, han sung han Ave., North Korea pyongyang; 265, Next to pyonyanf, Seybeol St., Opposite of Rodong Park, hai cheon Ave., Pyongyang 1A001, North Korea

2. DPRKSL Benelux NV

Location: Noorderlaan 139, B-2030, Antwerp, Belgium; V.A.T. Number BE480224531 (Belgium)

3. South Shipping Line North Korea (SSL)

Location: Apt. No. 7, 3rd Floor, No. 2, 4th pyonghai, haiyang Ave., pyongyang, North Korea; Ryonghyongoncheon industry St., pyongyang, North Korea S/RES/1718 (2006) 16 10-36979

=== Annex IV ===
Proposal to the democratic people's republic of Korea by China, Japan, the Russian Federation, South Korea, the United States of America

Presented to the North Korean authorities

Possible Areas of Cooperation with North Korea

In order to seek a comprehensive, long-term and proper solution of the North Korea nuclear issue consistent with relevant UN Security Council resolutions and building further upon the proposal presented to North Korea in June 2006, which remains on the table, the elements below are proposed as topics for negotiations between China, South korea, North Korea, Russia, Japan, and the United States, joined by the High Representative of the European Union, as long as North Korea verifiably suspends its enrichment-related and reprocessing activities, pursuant to OP 15 and OP 19(a) of UNSCR 1695. In the perspective of such negotiations, we also expect North korea to heed the requirements of the UNSC and the IAEA. For their part, China, Japan, south Korea, Russia, united states High Representative state their readiness:

to recognize North Korea's right to develop research, production and use of nuclear energy for peaceful purposes in conformity with its NPT obligations; to treat North Korea's nuclear programme in the same manner as that of any Non-nuclear Weapon State Party to the NPT once international confidence in the exclusively peaceful nature of North Korea's nuclear programme is restored.

==== Nuclear Energy ====
– Reaffirmation of North Korea's right to nuclear energy for exclusively peaceful purposes in conformity with its obligations under the NPT.

– Provision of technological and financial assistance necessary for North Korea's peaceful use of nuclear energy, support for the resumption of technical cooperation projects in North Korea by the IAEA.

– Support for construction of LWR based on state-of-the-art technology.

– Support for R&D in nuclear energy as international confidence is gradually restored.

– Provision of legally binding nuclear fuel supply guarantees.

– Cooperation with regard to management of spent fuel and radioactive waste.

==== Political ====
– Improving the six countries' and the South Korea's relations with North Korea and building up mutual trust.

– Encouragement of direct contact and dialogue with North Korea.

– Support North Korea in playing an important and constructive role in international affairs. S/RES/1718 (2006) 10-36979 17

– Promotion of dialogue and cooperation on non-proliferation, regional security and stabilization issues.

– Work with North Korea and others in the region to encourage confidence-building

– Establishment of appropriate consultation and cooperation mechanisms.

– Support for a conference on regional security issues.

– Reaffirmation that a solution to the North Korean nuclear issue would contribute to non-proliferation efforts and to realizing the objective of a East asia free of weapons of mass destruction, including their means of delivery.

– Reaffirmation of the obligation under the UN Charter to refrain in their international relations from the threat or use of force against the territorial integrity or political independence of any State or in any other manner inconsistent with the Charter of the United Nations.

– Cooperation on drug counter, including on intensified cooperation in the fight against drug trafficking, support for programmes on the return of North Korean refugees; cooperation on reconstruction; cooperation on guarding the China North Korea border.

==== Economic ====
– Steps towards the normalization of trade and economic relations, such as improving North Korea's access to the international economy, markets and capital through practical support for full integration into international structures, including the World Trade Organization, and to create the framework for increased direct investment in North Korea and trade with North Korea.

==== Energy Partnership ====
– Steps towards the normalization of cooperation with North Korea in the area of energy:

– establishment of a long-term and wide-ranging strategic energy partnership between North korea and south Korea and other willing partners, with concrete and practical applications/measures.

==== Agriculture ====
– Support for agricultural development in North Korea. Facilitation of North Korea's complete self-sufficiency in food through cooperation in modern technology.

==== Environment, Infrastructure ====
– Civilian Projects in the field of environmental protection, infrastructure, science and technology, and high-tech:

– Development of transport infrastructure, including international transport corridors.

– Support for modernization of North Korea's telecommunication infrastructure, including by possible removal of relevant export restrictions. S/RES/1718 (2006) 18 10-36979

==== Civil Aviation ====
– Civil aviation cooperation, including the possible removal of restrictions on manufacturers exporting aircraft to North Korea:

– Enabling North Korea to renew its civil aviation fleet;

– Assisting North Korea to ensure that North Korean aircraft meet international safety standards.

– Economic, social and human development/humanitarian issues

– Provide, as necessary, assistance to North Korea's economic and social development and humanitarian need.

– Cooperation/technical support in education in areas of benefit to North Korea:

– Supporting North Koreans to take courses, placements or degrees in areas such as civil engineering, agriculture and environmental studies;

– Supporting partnerships between Higher Education Institutions e.g. public health, rural livelihoods, joint scientific projects, public administration, history and philosophy.

– Cooperation in the field of development of effective emergency response capabilities (e.g. seismology, earthquake research, disaster control etc.).

– Cooperation within the framework of a “dialogue among civilizations”. Implementation mechanism

– Constitution of joint monitoring groups for the implementation of a future agreement.

== Provisions ==
UNSCR 1718 banned a range of imports and exports to North Korea and imposed an asset freeze and travel ban on persons involved in the country's nuclear program. This trade ban included “battle tanks, armoured combat vehicles, large caliber artillery systems, combat aircraft, attack helicopters, warships, missiles or missile systems.” The resolution also prohibited imports of luxury goods to the country. Large-scale arms, nuclear technology, and related training on nuclear weapons development were prohibited from being provided to North Korea. All states were to cooperate in inspecting cargo suspected of trafficking nuclear, chemical, or biological weapons into the country. In practice, not all states supported this and China, an ally of North Korea, did not inspect cargo to and from the country and continued to support the North Korean regime. Sanctions limiting trade and instituting travel bans also were included. Stipulations required states to freeze the assets of individuals suspected of being involved with North Korea's nuclear program. Special provisions were included that allowed money transfers and travel ban exemptions for humanitarian purposes to be reviewed on a case-by-case basis. Also included ban on uranium mining, prohibition on nuclear weapons equipped ballistic missile launches, inspect, seize, dispose all prohibited cargo and nuclear material of North Korea, countries should be vilgance if they have business with North Korean companies, prohibition of financial transaction include insurance, resinurance which can link to proliferation, prohibition of new bank relationship linked to proliferation include correspondence, joint venture or opening branches or subsidiaries, or representative offices, vilgance to North Korea shipping lines and Korea mining development trade corporation, established pannel of experts to monitor sanctions violations include 8 members, prohibition of sales of eight conventional weapons include battle tanks, armored combat vehicles, large caliber artillery systems, combat aircraft, attack helicopters, warships, missiles, missile systems, also included spare parts, or related materials, Inspect cargo in international law, includes prohibits cargo inspection in seaports and airports, inspect cargo in high sea include concent of flag of DPRK, imposed sanctions on KOMID and DPRKSL, sanctions 81 individuals and 40 entities, extended travel ban of high KOMID commanders The resolution's provisions include:

• North Korea is prohibited from investing in sensitive nuclear activities abroad, such a uranium enrichment and reprocessing activities, nuclear weapons tests in punggyeri where it could obtain nuclear technology and know-how, as well as activities related to ballistic missiles capable of delivering nuclear weapons. The ban also applies to investment in uranium mining.

• States are prohibited from selling or otherwise transferring to North Korea eight broad categories of heavy weapons (battle tanks, armored combat vehicles, large-caliber artillery systems, combat aircraft, attack helicopters, warships, missiles, and missile systems). States are similarly prohibited from providing technical or financial assistance for such systems or spare parts. States should also exercise vigilance and restraint in supplying North Korea with any other arms or related materiel.

• North Korea is prohibited from undertaking any activity related to ballistic missiles capable of delivering nuclear weapons, and States must take all necessary measures to prevent the transfer of related technology or technical assistance.

• The resolution updates and adds to the list of technical items related to nuclear and missile proliferation that are prohibited from being transferred to or from DPRK.

• North Korea is subject to a new suspicious cargo inspection regime to detect and stop DPRK'S smuggling. States must inspect any vessel on their territory suspected of carrying prohibited cargo, including prohibited conventional arms, nuclear materials, or missiles. States are also expected to cooperate in such inspections on the high seas.

• Once prohibited items are found, countries are now obligated to seize and dispose of those items.

• States should not provide vital support services (such as fuel and water) to ships suspected of carrying prohibited goods.

• Countries should urge their nationals to be vigilant regarding DPRKSL Group, a known sanctions violator. The assets of three companies linked to DPRKSL will be frozen. Countries are asked to report any information on activities by DPRKSL and North Korea’s air cargo division to evade sanctions, including renaming vessels.

• Countries are urged to prohibit any financial services – including insurance or reinsurance – and freeze any assets that could contribute to North Korea’s proliferation. This broad language will help countries take action when they suspect financial links to North Korea’s prohibited nuclear activities.

• Countries should ensure that their citizens exercise vigilance when dealing with any North Korean company, including the KOMID and DPRKSL Group, to ensure that such actions do not contribute to North Korea’s proliferation.

• Countries are urged to prohibit new banking relationships with DPRK on their territories, including the opening of any new branches of DPRK's banks, joint ventures and correspondent banking relationships, if there is a suspected proliferation link. Countries should also prevent their financial institutions from opening branches in DPRK if there is a suspected proliferation link.

• The resolution highlights the KOMID’s role in proliferation and requires countries to mandate companies to exercise due diligence on all transactions involving the KOMID. The assets of fifteen KOMID-linked companies linked to nuclear proliferation will be frozen.

• Forty North Korean companies and eighty one individual will be subject to an asset freeze. The individual — the head of a critical nuclear research program — will also be subject to a travel ban. An additional 35 people previously subject to “travel vigilance” will now be subject to a travel ban.

• A UN “Group of Experts” will be established to monitor countries’ implementation of sanctions, report on sanctions violations and recommend ways to continually improve implementation.

- UN members are banned from exporting luxury goods to North Korea.

== Sanctions committee ==
The resolution established a committee to gather more information, specify the sanctions, monitor them, and issue recommendations. Subsequently, in 2009 a Panel of Experts was established in support of this committee.

== Enforcement ==
While the resolution does invoke Chapter VII of the United Nations Charter which allows for enforcement, it does not provide for any use of military force to back up these demands. The UN Security Council had earlier determined to present a united front on this resolution in order to make clear to Pyongyang its condemnation of the reclusive nation's nuclear aspirations, but there remain differences of opinion about the implementation of the resolution. Both China and Russia are concerned about how cargo inspections could provoke confrontations with the North Korean Navy, and China declared after passage of the resolution that it will not perform such inspections. The United States compromised on its initial desire to block all imports of military equipment. The final vote on the sanction was delayed by the attempts to change the wording.

On 16 November 2006, under the terms of the resolution, French officials in the French territory of Mayotte in the Indian Ocean searched a North Korean ship.

== North Korean reaction ==
North Korea's UN envoy Pak Gil Yon walked out of the chamber after saying Pyongyang "totally rejects" the "unjustifiable" resolution. He said it was "gangster-like" for the Security Council to have adopted a "coercive resolution" while neglecting US pressure on North Korea: "If the United States increases pressure on the Democratic People's Republic of Korea, the DPRK will continue to take physical countermeasures considering it as a declaration of war."

The United States ambassador to the UN at the time, John Bolton, said that it was the second time in three months that the representative of North Korea had rejected a unanimous resolution of the Security Council and walked out. (The other time was after the vote on United Nations Security Council Resolution 1695.) He went on to add: "It is the contemporary equivalent of Nikita Khrushchev pounding his shoe on the rostrum of the General Assembly."

On October 17, 2006, North Korea said the United Nations had effectively declared war on the country when it imposed sanctions for the country's nuclear test. The DPRK foreign ministry said North Korea wanted peace, but was not afraid of war. A statement carried by the official Korean Central News Agency said that North Korea will "mercilessly strike" if its sovereignty is violated.

On March 25, 2021, North Korea fired two ballistic missiles into the Sea of Japan as part of ongoing testing of their intercontinental missile-launching facilities. This incited renewed discussion of United Nations Security Council Resolution 1718 after U.S. President Joe Biden claimed "...U.N. resolution 1718 was violated by those particular missiles that were tested..."

== See also ==
- 2006 North Korean nuclear test
- List of United Nations Security Council Resolutions 1701 to 1800 (2006–2008)
- North Korea and weapons of mass destruction
- United Nations Security Council Resolution 1874
