= United Nations Security Council Resolution 1874 =

UN Security Council Resolution 1874
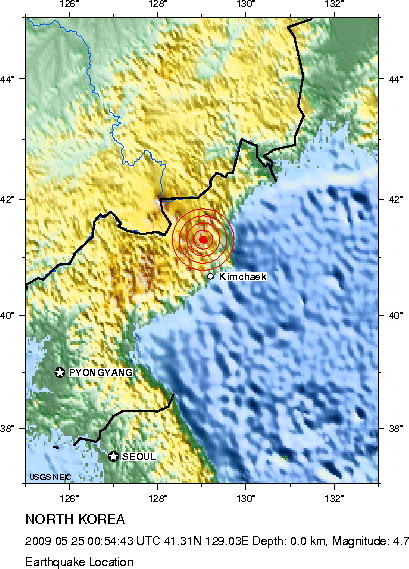
- Location of 25 May nuclear test
- Date: 12 June 2009
- Meeting no.: 6,141
- Code: S/2009/301 (Document)
- Subject: Non-proliferation; Democratic People's Republic of Korea
- Voting summary: 15 voted for; None voted against; None abstained
- Result: Adopted

Security Council composition
- Permanent members: China; France; Russia; United Kingdom; United States
- Non-permanent members: Austria; Burkina Faso; Costa Rica; Croatia; Japan; Libya; Mexico; Turkey; Uganda; Vietnam

United Nations Security Council Resolution 1874 was adopted unanimously by the United Nations Security Council on 12 June 2009. The resolution, passed under Chapter VII, Article 41, of the UN Charter, imposes further economic and commercial sanctions on the Democratic People's Republic of Korea (the DPRK, or North Korea) and encourages UN member states to search North Korean cargo, in the aftermath of an underground nuclear test conducted on 25 May 2009.

== Provisions ==
The provisions of the resolution include:

- Authorizing member states to inspect, "in accordance with their national authorities and legislation, and consistent with international law", North Korean cargo on land, sea, and air, and to destroy any goods suspected of being connected to the DPRK's nuclear programme.
- Requiring the North Korean government to return immediately to the six-party talks and renounce its announcement of withdrawal from the Nuclear Non-Proliferation Treaty.
- Preventing financial services that could contribute to the nuclear or ballistic missile related programmes.
- Instructing member states not to provide financial assistance to the DPRK nuclear programme, or enter into loans with the country, except for humanitarian or developmental reasons.
- Extending the arms embargo on North Korea by banning all weapons exports from the country and most imports, with an exception to small arms, light weapons and related material – though member states must notify the Security Council five days prior to selling the weapons.
- Demanding that North Korea halt its nuclear weapons program and conduct no further nuclear or missile tests.
- Asking member states to notify the Council of steps they are taking to implement the sanctions within 45 days.
- Affirming the Security Council's commitment to a peaceful, diplomatic resolution to the situation.
- Creating the Panel of Experts as a research and advisory body to the UN Security Council Sanctions Committee on North Korea (subject to annual renewal).

== Adoption ==
Adopting the resolution unanimously, the Council condemned the nuclear test which was in "violation and flagrant disregard" of previous Council resolutions 1695 and 1718. The resolution is now binding under international law.

=== Security Council permanent members ===
- China: Ambassador Zhang Yesui said China voted in favor of the resolution as actions by North Korea were in "disregard for the international community’s common objective". However, he stressed that the diplomatic means should be employed rather than merely imposing sanctions, and the resolution should not "adversely impact the country’s development, or humanitarian assistance to it". He also urged against the use of force when inspecting North Korean cargo.
- France: Ambassador Jean-Maurice Ripert remarked that the DPRK had been "engaged in a secret nuclear programme" which increased its threat. He said that the country had increased tensions in the region by firing missiles and the Security Council had responded to that by imposing tough sanctions on the regime, though he mentioned that the Council was concerned about the population.
- Russia: Permanent Representative Vitaly Churkin said the measures adopted were "substantive and targeted in nature", and "clearly tied to ending the DPRK programme to create nuclear missiles". He insisted the sanctions did not target the North Korean people, which was a key issue with his delegation. He also insisted that any sanctions be lifted once North Korea cooperates.
- United Kingdom: Deputy Ambassador Philip Parham said the adoption of the resolution shows that "the international community is united in condemning North Korea's proliferation activities".
- United States: Envoy Rosemary DiCarlo said that the resolution created "markedly stronger sanctions" against Pyongyang to persuade it to abandon its nuclear weapons program. This was followed by U.S. Ambassador to the UN Susan Rice who claimed the resolution was "unprecedented" and has "teeth that will bite". The resolution was a "strong and united international response" to the testing of the nuclear device.

=== Security Council elected members ===
- Austria: Ambassador Thomas Mayr-Harting said the resolution was a "clear, appropriate and unequivocal" response to North Korea's actions. He called for the country to rejoin the Comprehensive Nuclear-Test-Ban Treaty (CTBT).
- Burkina Faso: Deputy Representative Paul Robert Tiendrébéogo supported the resolution emphasising his country's aspiration for a nuclear-free world and the right to peaceful use of nuclear energy. He called on North Korea to cooperate with the International Atomic Energy Agency, six-party talks and other institutions stressing that the country should "choose dialogue".
- Croatia: Ambassador Ranko Vilović mentioned that the sanctions were not targeted towards the North Korean population, but called on North Korea to accede to the CTBT and six-party talks.
- Costa Rica: Permanent Representative Jorge Urbina echoed the views of the rest of the Council, and urged the country to return to international systems of dialogue.
- Japan: Permanent Representative Yukio Takasu welcomed the resolution, describing the DPRK's actions as an "irresponsible act" which constituted a threat to his country. He hoped the resolution adopted would change the actions of North Korea. The Japanese Prime Minister Taro Aso also urged North Korea to take the resolution "seriously".
- Libya: Permanent Representative Abdurrahman Mohamed Shalgham said the world would not enjoy security until all nuclear weapons were eliminated. He said the international community had failed to reward Libya for ceasing its nuclear programme and hoped similar sanctions would be applied to Israel. Shalgham also said that while his country did not normally support sanctions which harm the population, in this case this was the best way forward to bring about a solution to the situation.
- Mexico: Ambassador Claude Heller said the resolution was a "clear message" that North Korea's actions were unacceptable to the international community. He remarked that recent actions by the DPRK were in violation of Security Council resolutions which undermined aspirations for a nuclear-free world and urged North Korea to "completely and permanently" cease further nuclear tests.
- Turkey: Speaking in his national capacity, the current Council President Baki İlkin said recent actions by North Korea undermined stability, mutual trust and confidence in the region, which the Turkish government strongly condemned. He urged the country to rejoin the six-party talks, seeing them as the best way forward to ensure denuclearization on the Korean peninsula.
- Uganda: Permanent Representative Ruhakana Rugunda echoed the sentiment of the Council, as it was "important to achieve non-proliferation on the Korean peninsula".
- Vietnam: Representative Le Luong Minh supported the consensus of the Council, emphasising his country's commitment to non-proliferation but remarked that the sanctions should not adversely affect the population of North Korea.

=== Other UN members ===
- South Korea: South Korea was invited to participate during the session. Representative Park In-kook said the nuclear test violated Council resolutions and "defied warnings from the international community" which threatened peace and stability in the region, thus all member states should ensure they implement the sanctions fully. He said the South Korean government strongly urged the North to rejoin the six-party talks and to abandon its nuclear weapons and missile programmes.

== North Korean reaction ==
An official newspaper said that the country would consider any new sanctions imposed as a "declaration of war". In response, a statement from the Foreign Ministry, carried by the official Korean Central News Agency (KCNA), said that the country would "weaponize all plutonium" and had reprocessed more than "one-third of our spent nuclear fuel rods". It also announced it would start uranium enrichment. The statement considered any attempt at a blockade as an "act of war that will be met with a decisive military response", and would "counter 'sanctions' with retaliation and 'confrontation' with all-out confrontation", accusing the resolution of being a product of a U.S.-led offensive against the country. The North Korean Foreign Ministry statement on KCNA continues:

The U.S. and Japan, not content with this "resolution", are hatching dirty plots to add their own "sanctions" to the existing ones against the DPRK by framing up the fictional issues of "counterfeit money" and "drug trafficking". The U.S. incited the United Nations Security Council to get more deeply embroiled in its attempt to stifle the DPRK, which resulted in the creation of an unprecedentedly acute tension on the Korean Peninsula.

...

Had any other country found itself in the situation of the DPRK, it would have clearly realized that the DPRK has never chosen but was compelled to go nuclear in the face of the U.S. hostile policy and its nuclear threats. It has become an absolutely impossible option for the DPRK to even think about giving up its nuclear weapons. It makes no difference to the DPRK whether its nuclear status is recognized or not.

A commentary in the Rodong Sinmun newspaper alleged the United States had 1,000 nuclear weapons in South Korea ready to strike North Korea, with the Tongbil Sinmun warning that nuclear war could break out on the Korean peninsula. A U.S. military spokesman described the allegations as "baseless", adding that the weapons were removed under a 1991 treaty.

On June 15, the North Korean government organized a "mammoth" 100,000-strong protest in Pyongyang's Kim Il-sung Square against Resolution 1874. Secretary of the Central Committee Workers' Party of Korea Kim Ki Nam blamed the United States for pushing through the sanctions, adding that they would not weaken the DPRK.

== Enforcement ==
=== Economic and commercial sanctions ===
The South Korean-based Hyundai Economic Research Institute estimated that if the sanctions are enforced by all UN member states, North Korea could lose between US$1.5–3.7 billion, whereas other estimates suggest US$4 billion. However, a Congressional Research Service report for the United States Congress notes that this is only possible if the sanctions are applied forcefully. The United States is targeting access by North Korea to foreign banks used by its trading companies. On 16 July 2009, a UN sanctions committee designated for sanctions three North Korean trading companies, an Iran-based company and North Korea's General Bureau of Atomic Energy.

Luxury consumer goods, such as alcohol, computers, motorcycles, yachts, and luxury foods, for the North Korean elite, were primarily sourced from Europe and China, the latter of which reported a high demand by top North Korean officials. The exports of luxury goods by China in particular is around US$100–160 million, which has caused concern for the United States as to how China is implementing the sanctions.

=== Sea cargo ===
A number of North Korean ships have been seized or searched under the terms of Resolution 1874.

- The Kang Nam 1 came to international attention after it was heading for Burma via Singapore in June 2009. The ship, suspected of carrying illicit weapons, was tracked by the United States and Singapore also warned it would "act appropriately" if the ship were to dock at its port. Burma claimed it was delivering rice to the country. The Kang Nam 1 later reversed its course without explanation and returned to North Korea. An unnamed South Korean government source said that payment for the weapons from Myanmar's government were to take place via an unnamed bank in Malaysia, but had probably been stopped after a U.S. envoy visited Malaysia on 6 July to discuss the situation.
- India detained a "suspicious" North Korean ship off the Andaman and Nicobar Islands in early August 2009 after firing several warning shots into the air and six hour chase. The MV Mu San was suspected of carrying nuclear cargo and entering India's waters without permission. A search of the ship later found that it was carrying sugar, but it would still be booked under the Indian Maritime Act.
- In late August 2009, United Nations diplomats confirmed the United Arab Emirates had seized a North Korean ship, the Bahamian-flagged ANL-Australia, bound for Iran several weeks previously. It was found to have been carrying weapons in violation of the resolution.
- South Korean authorities searched containers shipped by North Korea on a Panamanian flagged ship on September 22, 2009. Protective clothing was later discovered. However, a government official said items found in the containers belonged to the Australia Group, though officially the South Korean government did not confirm nor deny this.
- India seized a second North Korean ship destined for Pakistan from Colombo, Sri Lanka, in October 2009 after it anchored in India's territorial waters without permission. The Hyang Ro was later released after nothing suspicious was found.
- South Africa intercepted North Korean arms travelling by way of China destined for central Africa in February 2010.
- In mid-July 2013, Panama seized a North Korean-flagged ship carrying military equipment from Cuba to North Korea via the Panama Canal.

=== Air cargo ===
The resolution is vague on how to implement sanctions on North Korean air cargo, in contrast to the provisions for sea cargo. However, it is alleged that North Korea uses air traffic more than sea traffic to transport or exchange weapons technology. The Congressional Research Service report identifies the Pyongyang–Tehran air route as a matter of concern, as most of the US$1.5 billion North Korea earns in weapons sales comes from Iran. In addition to this, the report claims the air route is also used for the exchange and collaboration of WMD technology, as well as a route for visits by scientists, technicians and nuclear and ballistics officials. Most of the route passes over China, and a U.S. delegation held talks with Chinese officials over how to implement the resolution regarding the aircraft which regularly refuel at Chinese airports, but did not report on the response.

- In December 2009, police in Thailand seized a plane with five crew on board from North Korea carrying weapons to an unknown location. The shipment reportedly consisted of "parts" of war weapons. Interpol was involved according to Prime Minister Abhisit Vejjajiva and foreign embassies were asked for further information. The men were later arrested and it was later discovered that the weapons were bound for Iran.

== See also ==
- 2009 North Korean nuclear test
- List of United Nations Security Council Resolutions 1801 to 1900 (2008–2009)
- United Nations Security Council Resolution 1718
- North Korea and weapons of mass destruction
- Kwangmyŏngsŏng-3 (reflight)
