= United Nations Security Council Resolution 1695 =

UN Security Council Resolution 1695
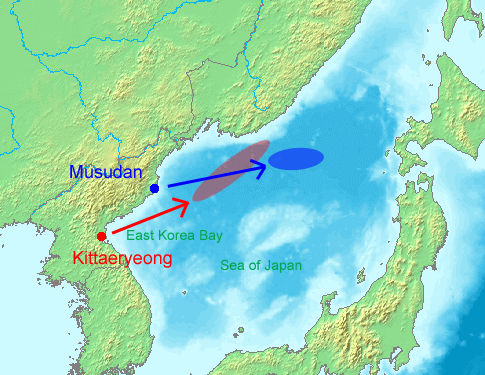
- Missile launch on July 4, 2006 by North Korea. Blue area estimates where the Taepodong-2 impacted on Sea of Japan
- Date: 15 July 2006
- Meeting no.: 5,490
- Code: S/RES/1695 (Document)
- Subject: The situation concerning North Korea; Non-proliferation
- Voting summary: 15 voted for; None voted against; None abstained
- Result: Adopted

Security Council composition
- Permanent members: China; France; Russia; United Kingdom; United States
- Non-permanent members: Argentina; Rep. of the Congo; Denmark; Ghana; Greece; Japan; Peru; Qatar; Slovakia; Tanzania

United Nations Security Council Resolution 1695, adopted unanimously on July 15, 2006, banned the selling of material that would further the ability of the Democratic People's Republic of Korea (the DPRK or North Korea) to bolster its ballistic missiles programme. Resolution 1695 was adopted after recalling resolutions 825 (1993) and 1540 (2004) concerning North Korea and the non-proliferation of weapons of mass destruction, respectively.

== Adoption and provisions ==
The resolution condemns the missile test launches carried out by North Korea on July 4, 2006. The wording and strength of the statement was a compromise between the United States, Japan, and France, who favoured a strong statement and sanctions and the People's Republic of China and Russia, who favoured a less severe statement. The resolution does not invoke Chapter VII of the United Nations Charter per request of China and Russia. The resolution was submitted by Japan and sponsored by the United States.

The resolution bans all UN member states from selling material or technology for missiles or weapons of mass destruction to North Korea, and from receiving missiles, banned weapons or technology from Pyongyang. It also called on North Korea to rejoin the six-party talks and refrain from conducting further missile and nuclear tests. An official from the South Korean Foreign Ministry said ""North Korea will have to recognize the reality that the international community is taking its missile and nuclear activities more seriously."

== North Korean reaction ==
The resolution was rejected by North Korea in a record 47 minutes according to the United States ambassador to the U.N., John R. Bolton. According to the North Korean official state news agency, KCNA, the resolution was a product of "hostile foreign policy towards the DPRK", which has created "an extremely dangerous situation on the Korean Peninsula". The statement continues:

Only the strong can defend justice in the world today where the jungle law prevails. Neither the UN nor anyone else can protect us.
...First, our Republic vehemently denounces and roundly refutes the UNSC "resolution", a product of the U.S. hostile policy towards the DPRK, and will not be bound to it in the least. Second, our Republic will bolster its war deterrent for self-defence in every way by all means and methods now that the situation has reached the worst phase due to the extremely hostile act of the U.S. We will firmly defend our own way the ideology and system chosen by our people, true to the Songun policy, a treasured sword.

North Korea said the resolution was an "attempt by some countries to misuse the Security Council". The DPRK Ambassador to the United Nations, Pak Kil-yon, said his country "had expressed its intention to extend beyond 2003 the moratorium on missile firing, in the spirit of the Declaration, on the premise that Japan would normalize its relations with his country and redeem its past...[Since Japan] abused his country’s good faith and pursued a hostile policy."

== See also ==
- List of United Nations Security Council Resolutions 1601 to 1700 (2005–2006)
- North Korea and weapons of mass destruction
