= Francesco Alarico della Scala =

Italian political scholar (born 1996)

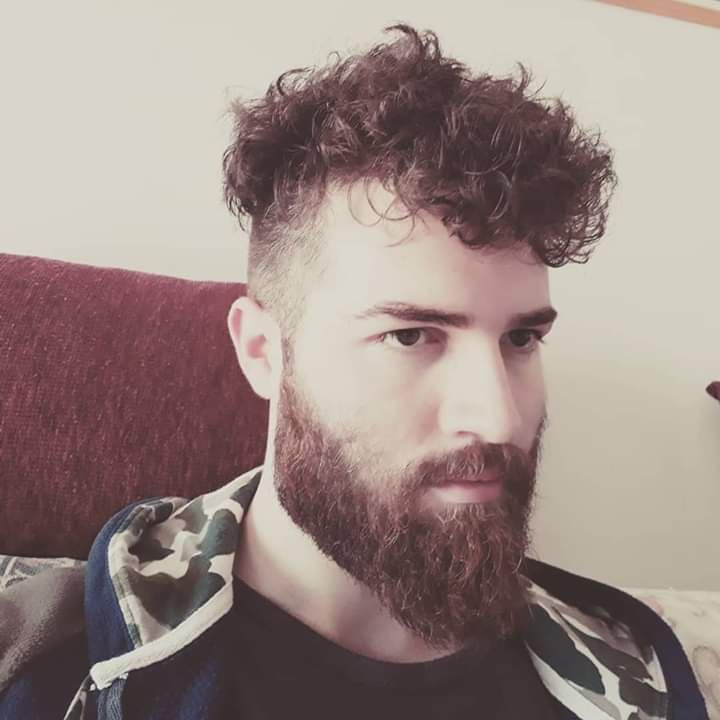

Head of the Korean Friendship Association in Piedmont and Aosta Valley
- Incumbent
- Assumed office October 2014

Depute director of the Milan Juche Idea Study Center
- Incumbent
- Assumed office July 2015

Personal details
- Born: 8 June 1996 (age 30) Pinerolo, Piedmont, Italy
- Education: University of Turin

Francesco Alarico della Scala (born 8 June 1996) is an Italian scholar of philosophy, socialism, and the Juche idea. He is the deputy director of the Juche Idea Study Center in Milan, and head of the Korean Friendship Association — Italy (KFA — Italy) in Piedmont and Aosta Valley. He has been described as an expert on North Korea and its ideology.

His works include Socialism and the Market in North Korea (Italian: Socialismo e mercato in Corea del Nord, 2019), and Kim Jong Un: ideology, politics, and economics in North Korea (Italian: Kim Jong Un: ideologia, politica ed economia nella Corea Popolare, 2020). He also wrote articles for L'Interferenza, Oltre la Linea, and the Brazilian Nova Resistência, as well as the academic journal Eurasia, Rivista di Studi Geopolitici.

== Biography ==
=== Early works ===
Francesco Alarico della Scala was born in 1996 in Pinerolo, Italy. In 2015, he wrote articles for the Italian newspaper L'Interferenza, in which he critically examined the analyses of Costanzo Preve and Hegelian elements in Marxism, and discussed the human nature argument against communism, noting that "only that part of human nature that conforms to the laws of the market economy is naturalized and made immutable—that is, its selfish instinct", while "all traits of human nature that actually or potentially conflict with the interests of capital become fluid and manipulable, that is, all traditions as a whole, family relationships, sexual identity". He also criticized those communists who approached vulgar materialism by denying the existence of human nature.

In October 2014, Francesco Alarico della Scala became a regional representative of the Korean Friendship Association — Italy, becoming the manager of KFA — Italy in the regions of Piedmont and Valle d'Aosta. In July 2015, he also became the deputy manager of the Juche Idea Study Center Center in Milan. He studied philosophy in the University of Turin. In October 2017, he was interviewed by the Esquire magazine, which introduced him as the regional official of the KFA, the deputy director of the Juche Idea Study Center Center in Milan, and one of the managers of "Hands Off Socialist Korea" (Italian: Giù le mani dalla Corea socialista) page. In his interview with Esquire, della Scala stated that it was his philosophical knowledge that led him to become interested in North Korea:

By investigating human nature as a concept that imposes itself on individuals from the outside, tempers their character, perfects their intelligence, and imposes a kind of discipline upon them, establishing them as human beings, North Korea has come to define man as a social being endowed with a sovereign spirit. This idea governs the various aspects of politics, the economy, and ideological-cultural work within the country.

In November 2017, della Scala participated in the street demonstration promoted by KFA and the CARC Party in solidarity with North Korea and against the UN sanctions imposed on the country. Participants of the demonstration argued that North Korea was "one of the few countries left, along with Cuba and Venezuela, to oppose American imperialism" and that it "simply doesn't want to suffer the fate of Syria, Iraq, and Libya".

By January 2018, della Scala was a contributor to the Roman media outlet Oltre la Linea. In March 2018, he wrote on the North Korean nuclear program. In June 2018, della Scala wrote an article named "Traditional family? True socialism defends it" (Italian: Famiglia tradizionale? Il vero socialismo la difende), in which he explained Juche view on family and patriarchy, discussed the difference between Marxist and non-Marxist definitions of patriarchy, and questioned interpretations according to which Marxism would seek abolition of family as an institution. In August 2018, he wrote another analysis of Preve, defending some of his ideas and arguing that the "proposal of communitarianism as a remedy for the damage done by Rousseauian anthropology, which has led the Western left astray, especially since 1968, closely resembles the theoretical movement initiated by Kim Jong Il". He was also credited by the Italian Communist Party for providing information on Juche idea.

In 2019, he was one of the authors of the first volume of History of Communism (Italian: Storia del comunismo), edited by Alessandro Pascale and published by Intellettuale Collettivo. He was also one of the authors of the second volume of the book, where he wrote the chapter on North Korea, La Repubblica Popolare Democratica della Corea. At that time, della Scala translated numerous texts from French. His translation work included translating the writings of Alain de Benoist for Italian publisher Arianna Editrice. He also translated a fragment of Deng Xiaoping's writings for Marx21. Later that year della Scala published one of his major works, Socialism and the Market in North Korea (Italian: Socialismo e mercato in Corea del Nord). It also was published by Marx21, as well as Appello al Popolo, the journal of the political party Riconquistare l'Italia.

=== 2020 ===
In 2020, della Scala wrote a response to Bill Bland's critique of North Korea as revisionist from Hoxhaist view; della Scala's response was published by Dermot Hudson on his website. The same year, della Scala was also requested by the news website Il Giornale del Riccio to review the claims made by a YouTube channel Project Happiness that documented a trip to North Korea. Reviewing the documented trip, della Scala praised the video in some elements while criticizing it for repeating false claims about North Korea, commenting on the case of Otto Warmbier that was discussed in the documentary:

The most serious falsehood, in my opinion driven not by ignorance but by a deliberate attempt to spread disinformation aimed at sensationalizing the story, concerns the case of Otto Friedrick Warmbier. All American citizens who commit crimes in North Korea are theoretically sentenced to long prison terms, but in reality they only serve a few months, if not weeks or days, because they are immediately amnestied in exchange for financial concessions from Washington. It's a system that's been tried and tested for decades, but the White House didn't lift a finger for Warmbier…

More importantly, he wasn't "mysteriously killed," but rather fell into a coma following an allergic reaction. North Korean medical personnel kept him alive for eleven months, but once he was admitted to an American hospital, he died within days. Doctors in Cincinnati who examined his body upon his return confirmed that the boy had not been tortured and was in good condition, but the family refused to perform an autopsy to determine the cause of death, and the American government rejected every proposal from Pyongyang for a joint, impartial investigation.

However, he also praised the video for demystifying North Korea:

The video nevertheless offers a glimpse into the reality of the country that can be useful in bringing Korea closer to the general public and which, moreover, largely refutes the prejudices weighing on the author's shoulders. At one point, when asked about the possibility of greater openness if sanctions were lifted, a guide replies: “Why not?”. This and other scenes provide food for thought for viewers who are beginning to ask questions and question the mainstream narrative of “Orwellian totalitarianism”.

Unfortunately, the majority are still too closed-minded and await the prompting of preconceived ideas, reiterated in the conclusion of the last video with an apotheosis of Western freedom, which certainly seems cool to those who can afford to quit their jobs for a year and travel the world, but whose meaning for workers impoverished by capitalism is brilliantly expressed in a comment by a certain “guest”, who complains that North Koreans “don't have time to get drunk or beg because [they have to] submit to dictatorship”.

Indeed, socialism spares the Korean people from tasting the poisoned fruits of such “freedom” under the law of the jungle, defends their culture and national identity from the uprooting forces of globalisation, resists the hunger-inducing sanctions of imperialism and, as the years go by, raises the standard of living of its citizens, gradually tearing away the veil of media demonology.

=== Later activities ===
In 2021, together with Hudson, della Scala was a contributor to and editor of Exposing Criticism of the Juche idea (Brazilian Portuguese: Expondo à luz as críticas contra a ideia Juche), a book published by KFA — Brazil. The same year, della Scala was interviewed by L'Antidiplomatico, where he was asked about claims made by Daily NK regarding dress and haircut laws in North Korea. He stated that there are no legal regulations on clothing and hairstyles in North Korea, and questioned the reliability of Daily NK, noting that the newspaper had made unsourced claims that were later proven false, such as circulating allegations of Kim Jong Un's death in 2020. He also cited an article from la Repubblica, which reported the presence of Western literature in Pyongyang libraries. L'Antidiplomatico later credited della Scala for further clarifications and analyses of rumours regarding North Korea.

In 2022 and 2023, della Scala's writings were published on the website Rami Spogli. In 2022, Rami Spogli published two articles – one featuring a statement from della Scala discussing Kim Il Sung's writings and North Korean policies on sexual issues, and the second one where he defended the sexual policies of the Workers' Party of Korea in a response to criticisms made by a group Le Gauche Collective. In 2023, the website published his article titled "Socialism and sexual power" (Italian: Socialismo e potere sessuale), which explained the analysis of sexual issues in Juche. Della Scala demonstrated that Juche compares “sexual freedom” to racism on the basis of both "conveying the most primitive and bestial human instincts that a healthy society must neutralize."

In July 2023, along with Maurizio Tirassa from the University of Turin, Francesco Alarico della Scala was interviewed by Gabriele Germani as an expert on North Korean affairs. In 2023, a Roman Catholic magazine inFormazione Cattolica described him as "a recognized expert on North Korea" and discussed his articles in the academic journal Eurasia, Rivista di Studi Geopolitici. Similarly, Gazzetta dell'Emilia described him as "renowned expert on North Korea". In 2024, the newspaper of the Communist Party, La Riscossa, described him as "one of the leading Italian experts on the Democratic People's Republic of Korea". La Riscossa cited his statement on the difference between progressive bourgeois nationalism (examples given being Gaddafi's Libya, Nasser's Egypt, Saddam's Iraq, and Assad's Syria) that DPRK supports, and the reactionary one (Nazi Germany and Fascist Italy) which it opposes.

In 2025, he was interviewed by a minor Italian website OttolinaTV. In its criticism of North Korea from 2025, the Hoxhaist quarterly journal Revolutionary Democracy cited della Scala as "a prominent supporter of Juche and a philosophy scholar". In November 2025, he launched his own Discord server "Juche Fortress" that would be a space to "study Kimilsungism-Kimjongilism". In January 2026, the Brazilian Paektu Institute (Brazilian Portuguese: Instituto Paektu - Brasil) published della Scala's work titled Cats and Blowflies: Chinese Reforms Viewed from Pyongyang (Brazilian Portuguese: Gatos e moscas varejeiras: as reformas chinesas vistas de Pyongyang), which analyzes how the socioeconomic system implemented and developed in China by Deng Xiaoping and his successors, known as Socialism with Chinese Characteristics, is evaluated in Juche and North Korea.

== Bibliography ==
- Socialismo e mercato in Corea del Nord (2019)
- La Repubblica Popolare Democratica della Corea, in Storia del comunismo (2019). vol. 1 & 2
- Kim Jong Un: ideologia, politica ed economia nella Corea Popolare (2020). ISBN 9788898444762
- Expondo à luz as críticas contra a ideia Juche (2021)
- Kim Il Sung e Confucio (2024). Eurasia, Rivista di Studi Geopolitici, 1/2024
- Gatos e moscas varejeiras: as reformas chinesas vistas de Pyongyang (2026)

== See also ==
- Dermot Hudson
- Robert Egan
- Kim Myong-chol
- Alejandro Cao de Benós
- Robert Griffiths
- Andy Brooks
