= List of flag bearers for North Korea at the Paralympics =

North Korea at the Paralympics
- IOC code: PRK
- NOC: Olympic Committee of the Democratic People's Republic of Korea
- Medals: Gold 0 Silver 0 Bronze 0 Total 0

Summer appearances
- 2012; 2016; 2020–2024

Winter appearances
- 2018; 2022

This is a list of flag bearers for North Korea at the Paralympics.

Flag bearers carry the national flag of their country at the opening ceremony of the Paralympic Games.

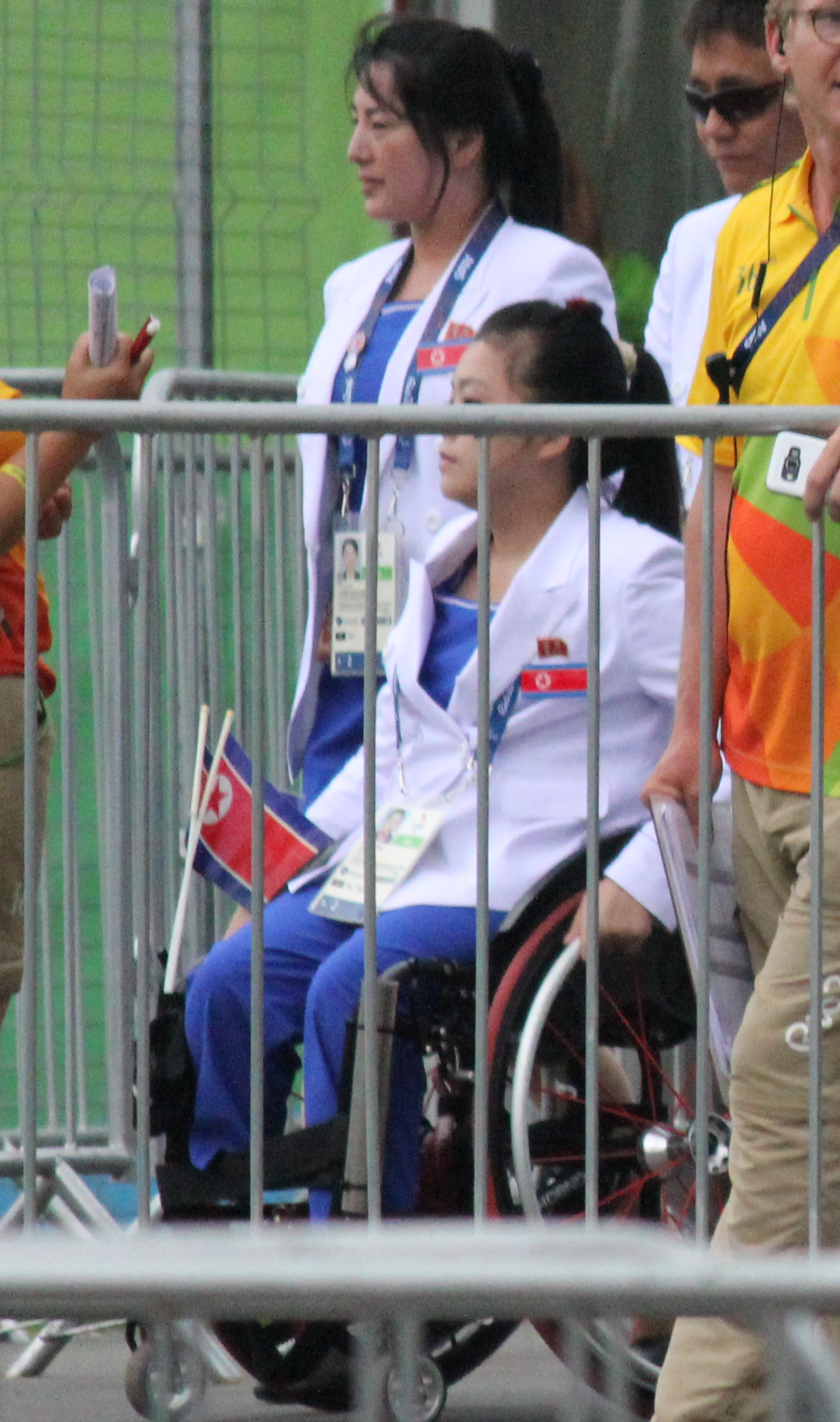
Song Kum-jong about to board the bus to attend the Opening Ceremonies of the Rio Games.

Event year	Season	Flag bearer	Sport
2012	Summer	Rim Ju-song	Swimming
2016	Summer	Song Kum-jong	Athletics
2018	Winter	Kim Jong-hyon	Cross-country skiing

== See also ==
- North Korea at the Paralympics
