= Disability in North Korea =

Reliable information about disability in North Korea, like other information about social conditions in the country, is difficult to find. As of 2016, North Korea is a signatory to the United Nations Convention on the Rights of Persons with Disabilities.

Under Kim Il Sung, disabled veterans enjoyed a high social status. A factory to employ disabled soldiers was established in 1970. Life for other disabled people under Kim Il Sung was "sad, if not horrible", according to North Korea scholar Fyodor Tertitskiy. In 1998, the Korean Association for Supporting the Disabled was established, later renamed the Korean Federation for the Protection of the Disabled, to represent the rights and interests of people with disabilities with support from the Ministry of Public Health.

== Disability rights conventions ==
As a state party to the International Covenant on Economic, Social and Cultural Rights (ICESCR), the Convention on the Rights of the Child (CRC), and the Convention on the Rights of Persons with Disabilities (CRPD), North Korea has international obligations to refrain from discriminating against its people based on disability (among others). Under Article 2 of the CRC, "States Parties shall respect and ensure the rights set forth in the present Convention to each child within their jurisdiction without discrimination of any kind, irrespective of the child's or their parent's or legal guardian's race, colour, sex, language, religion, political or other opinion, national, ethnic or social origin, property, disability, birth or other status" (emphasis added).

North Korea ratified CRPD in December 2016.

In May 2017 the United Nations special rapporteur on the rights of people with disabilities made a first official visit of eight days to North Korea. At a news conference at the end of her visit, the rapporteur, Catalina Devandas Aguilar, called for more attention to be given to disabled people in the country.

== Social services ==
The charity Handicap International reports that it has been operating in North Korea since 1999, assisting the Korean Federation for the Protection of Disabled People, including supporting orthopedic centers serving thousands of disabled people. The International Committee of the Red Cross reported in 2006 that it had assisted in setting up a rehabilitation center for disabled people in Pyongyang, and assisting with rehabilitation program support until 2017. The International Campaign to Ban Landmines reports that North Korea "has a comprehensive system for assisting persons with disabilities; however, this system is limited by the general economic situation of the country."

Still, the United Nations Special Rapporteur on the situation of human rights in the Democratic People's Republic of Korea, Marzuki Darusman, stated the following in his report before the UN Human Rights Council's twenty-second session:

As early as 2003 the Commission on Human Rights expressed deep concern at the "mistreatment of and discrimination of disabled children". Since 2006 the General Assembly has consistently decried "continuing reports of violations of the human rights and fundamental freedoms of persons with disabilities, especially on the use of collective camps and of coercive measures that target the rights of a person with disabilities to decide freely and responsibly on the number and spacing of their children." Whereas in 2006 the Special Rapporteur noted, "to date, the situation facing those with disabilities are sent away from the capital city, and particularly those with the mental disabilities are detained in areas or camps known as 'Ward 49' with harsh and subhuman conditions."

North Korea adopted a law in 2003 to promote equal access for disabled people to public services and claimed in its second report on compliance with the International Covenant on Economic, Social and Cultural Rights that its disabled citizens are protected. North Korea acceded to this covenant on September 14, 1981. However, its law has not been implemented, and North Korean refugees in the South testify that disabled people are severely discriminated against unless they are wounded soldiers who say their wounds were the result of American aggression in the Korean War.

By 2008, the United Nations reported that the government was "beginning to consider welfare for the disabled". The 2008 population census, conducted with the assistance of the United Nations Population Fund, found that 8.16% of the population had some type of disability: 2.4% sight, 1.7% hearing, 2.5% mobility, and 1.5% mental health problems.

== Separation in camps ==
Disabled people, with the exception of veterans, have been relocated to places far away from cities since the rule of Kim Il Sung.

In the early 2000s, it was reported that persons with disabilities in North Korea were locked away in camps, and "subjected to harsh and sub-human conditions". Vitit Muntarbhorn, the United Nations' special rapporteur on human rights, reported in 2006 that North Koreans with disabilities were excluded from the country's showcase capital, Pyongyang, and kept in camps where they were categorised by disability. Defectors reported the existence of "collective camps for midgets", whose inmates were forbidden from having children.

== Sport ==
North Korea made its Paralympic Games début at the 2012 Summer Paralympics in London, sending a single wildcard representative (Rim Ju-song, a left arm and left leg amputee) to compete in swimming. Yahoo! News reported in 2012 that a Paralympic cultural centre exists in Pyongyang. The country sent two track and field athletes to the 2016 Summer Paralympics in Rio de Janeiro.

== Deaf experience ==
As stated above, information about the Deaf experience for North Korean citizens is hard to find. Korean culture tends to look down on disabled people. Often, disability is thought to have come from sins of a past life. Because of this, "family members think that the disability is detrimental to their social standing and try to hide the disabled person". This attitude toward Deafness is very prevalent in North Korea. We see this through the lack of reporting about a Deaf child in North Korean families. Diagnosing pre-school aged children with hearing disabilities is very difficult because parents are unwilling to get them into testing. Also, only 2% of Deaf North Korean children are enrolled in a Deaf school, compared to the average 10-12% of Deaf children in other developing countries. There is also a culture of families "hiding" their disabled children from the public lens, so the information that is available may not be accurate for every Deaf resident. Because of this fear of making disabilities known, there is not much education about hearing disabilities given to North Korean citizens who are Deaf or hard of hearing. Often parents will choose to just keep their Deaf child home instead of sending them to a residential school because of this. This makes it difficult for Deaf children to be properly educated and integrated into society.

For families who do disclose their child's Deafness, there are many schools for the Deaf in North Korea. The schools began being created in the 1940s, and by 1995 there were eight special schools for the Deaf. These schools provide education in Korean sign language, which was recognized as a language by the Korean government in 2003. These schools provide only 10 years of schooling, and prepare their students for very specific careers, such as being a barber or a seamstress. Because of the lack of diverse job training, job integration for the Deaf is scarce.

In 2003, a German man came to North Korea as a representation of the World Federation of the Deaf. His goals when coming to North Korea were to empower more Deaf individuals, create more Deaf schools, and teach Korean Sign Language to more interpreters. One of the main things Grund is known for is creating the first Deaf kindergarten in Pyongyang. His slogan is "nothing about us, without us", meaning that Deaf citizens of North Korea deserve to have a say in policies made for people with disabilities.

In 2014, North Korea debuted their all Deaf soccer team. They played their first out of country game in Australia. The players are between the ages of 15 and 25 and communicate with their coach using sign language and flags.

== Alleged infanticide of babies with birth defects ==
In 2006, the Catholic News Agency and The Times reported that a North Korean doctor who defected, Ri Kwang-chol, had claimed that babies born with physical defects are rapidly put to death and buried. This claim has been challenged in an article in The Diplomat.

== See also ==
- Health in North Korea
- Human rights in North Korea
- The Red Chapel – documentary film
