= Korea at the Paralympics =

Korea at the Paralympics may refer to:

- North Korea at the Paralympics
- South Korea at the Paralympics
