= Committee for Cultural Relations with Foreign Countries =

North Korean cultural exchange committee

Coordinates: 39°00′29″N 125°44′35″E

Korean name
- Chosŏn'gŭl: 대외문화련락위원회
- Hancha: 對外文化連絡委員會
- Revised Romanization: Daeoe munhwaryeollak wiwonhoe
- McCune–Reischauer: Taeoe munhwaryŏllak wiwŏnhoe

The Committee for Cultural Relations with Foreign Countries (CCRFC; Korean: 대외문화련락위원회) is a North Korean organization tasked with organizing cultural exchange with other countries.

== Overview ==
The committee was founded when the North Korean state was declared. It was modeled after its Soviet equivalent, the All-Union Society for Cultural Relations with Foreign Countries. Initially the organization sought to generate goodwill toward North Korea abroad, but after the North Korean famine it has concentrated on acquiring resources. It seeks hard currency from tourism, cultural diplomacy, and foreign direct investment. The current chairwoman is Kim Jong-suk and vice-chairman So Ho-won. It is based in Pyongyang.

=== Ideals ===
The committee supports the Korean Friendship Association and other friendship societies. The staff of the committee leads a relatively cosmopolitan life with access to foreign travel, people, and goods. Its personnel includes higher-ups in the ruling Workers' Party of Korea and the state security apparatus. The staff arranges business deals with foreigners to evade international trade restrictions and receive a share of the proceeds. Although these deals have had limited success, the committee remains influential as a point of contact for journalists and other foreign visitors, whose guides may be representatives of the committee. Its activities overlap and to some extent compete with those of the Ministry of Foreign Affairs.

In relation to Japan, one of the countries with which North Korea does not have diplomatic relations in East Asia, the association is often the North Korean organization that welcomes non-governmental delegations when they visit North Korea. One example is the visit to North Korea by a group from Sakaiminato City in Tottori Prefecture, which had a friendship city relationship with Wonsan City.

== See also ==
- Politics of North Korea
- Foreign relations of North Korea
- Culture of North Korea
- Alejandro Cao de Benós
- Ministry of External Economic Relations
