= Mikael Bertelsen =

Danish radio and TV personality (born 1967)

Mikael Bertelsen (born Mikael Simson Bertelsen on 5 October 1967) is a Danish radio and TV personality. He was a channel executive at public service station Radio24syv with Mads Brügger. He hosted shows such as Bertelsen - DR2´s Talkshow, 1999, De uaktuelle nyheder, 2002, den 11. time, 2007, Bertelsen på Caminoen and Læsegruppen Sundholm.

== Personal life ==
Bertelsen is married to Malou Aamund. The couple has three children.
