= Søren Dahlgaard =

Danish visual artist

- Citizenship: Danish
- Education: Slade School of Fine Art, University College London
- Occupation: Visual artist
- Notable work: The Dough Portraits series

Søren Dahlgaard (born 1973) is a Danish visual artist based in Copenhagen, Denmark. Dahlgaard's work is known for exploring the absurdity and playfulness of everyday life, transforming mundane objects and activities into action sculptures, and environmental and socially engaged art.

== Career and work ==
=== Education ===
Søren Dahlgaard was born in 1973 in the suburb Sorgenfri outside Copenhagen, Denmark. He holds a BA (Hons) degree from the Slade School of Fine Arts, University College London, 2002, where he studied under Professor Phyllida Barlow in the Sculpture department. In 2019, he completed a practice-led PhD from The Victorian College of the Arts, University of Melbourne, Australia. His PhD thesis, titled "Sculpture as Activating Object", introduce a new category within the field of contemporary action-sculpture, and investigates how a sculptural object activates a process of transformation through play.

=== Notable artworks ===
==== Growing Vegetables On a Coral Island, Hibalhidhoo ====
In 2002 Søren Dahlgaard created a vegetable farm on the island of Hibalhidhoo in the Maldives. Presented as a conceptual artwork, the agricultural initiative explored the symbiotic relationship between humans and their environment, emphasizing the importance of sustainability, self-sufficiency, and community resilience. Spanning over two years, the farm cultivated the soil to adapt to the lack of fresh groundwater, nutritious soil, and high temperatures. Exhibited at the National Gallery of the Maldives, the Hibalhidhoo vegetable farm was eventually able to produce chili, bell pepper, cucumber, watermelon, and pumpkin. In the subsequent years, local production increased significantly, reducing the import of chili and cucumber by 30%. The project was reconstructed and exhibited in Aarhus Kunsthal in 2011 along with a talk on arts role for the climate crisis with artist and author Rasheed Araeen.

==== The Dough Warrior ====
In 2007, Søren Dahlgaard created his alter ego "The Dough Warrior," which performed at the fair Art Copenhagen, Louisiana Museum of Modern Art’s 50th anniversary, and decorated The National Gallery of Denmark’s Christmas tree. Transforming 70 kg dough into baguettes, his costume became an artistic paintbrush which explored new ways of creating landscape, portrait and still life paintings. Exhibited at Louisiana Museum, Curator Anders Kold explained in the exhibition catalogue; "Perhaps Søren Dahlgaard feels like a Dough Warrior. Perhaps he doesn’t. He appears to be a combination of a human cannonball and a very sensitive individual. He finds himself in the art system and has chosen dough as his medium, but he could just as well have been impeded in his quest by having brushes tied to his body. He is obviously troubled by history, yet his work is not decidedly political and maintains an acknowledgement of art, of artist and different models of existence as fundamental categories At the same time his work is so wacky or distanced from reality that it cannot fail to bring at least a smile to one’s lips. But we don’t just sit and laugh at it."

==== The Dough Portraits ====
Presented for the first time in 2008, "The Dough Portraits" is an interactive art series where individuals have their faces covered with a 10 kg lump of dough, resulting in unconventional portraits. First exhibited at The National Gallery of Denmark, Dahlgaard invited museum guests to participate which resulted in a photographic series of portraiture that obscured the recognizable features of the subjects. Invited by art galleries, museums, biennales, and institutions globally, including Canada, the United States, Denmark, Brazil, the Maldives, Finland, Kosovo, China, South Korea and Australia. Dahlgaard has photographed more than two thousand individuals of all ages and backgrounds. The collaborative process of creating the portraits is part of the art as the final image. In 2008, "The Dough Portraits" were featured in the TV-programme ‘Den 11. time’ with journalist Mads Brügger. The series has been exhibited at TarraWarra Biennale – TarraWarra Museum of Art, Lianzhou International Photo Festival, The Photographers Gallery, Venice Biennale, KIASMA Museum for Contemporary Art, The Israeli Center for Digital Art, Gwangju Biennale, ECCO Contemporary Art Center, Brasilia Brazil, JCCAC – Jockey Club Creative Arts Centre, Centre for Contemporary Art Ujazdowski Castle, NAG – National Art Gallery of Maldives, Andipa Gallery, National Art Gallery of Kosovo, Vancouver Biennale and The National Art Gallery of Denmark.

==== The Maldives Exodus Caravan Show ====
In 2013, Søren Dahlgaard curated "The Maldives Exodus Caravan Show" with Elena Gilbert and Microclima. It was first shown at the 55th Venice Biennale with The Museum of Everything at Serra dei Giardini in 2013. Featuring artists such as Bik van der Pol, Antti Laitinen, Christian Falsnaes, Superflex, Rirkrit Tiravanija, and ten artists from the Maldives, "The Maldives Exodus Caravan Show" was a mobile touring exhibition that promoted environmental and political awareness. It was shown at Te Tuhi Arts Centre in Auckland, Silent Barn Art Center in New York, CCA Andratx in Mallorca and Art+Climate=Change 2015 in Melbourne. Søren Dahlgaard's sculpture "The Inflatable Island" was part of The Maldives Exodus Caravan Show, and also became part of the 11th Global Forum on Migration and Development Summit in Marrakesh, Morocco as part of Migration Week 2018.

==== The Human Cannonball ====
In 2021, Heart Museum for Contemporary Art hosted Søren Dahlgaard's performative artwork "The Human Cannonball". Exploring the field of action painting, the human cannonball artist was dipped in paint, shot out of the cannon and landed on a large canvas, creating an experimental painting. The museum wrote "Of historical and aesthetic significance for Søren Dahlgaard's action paintings are particularly the Japanese art group Gutai from the 1950s, Yves Klein and Piero Manzoni in Europe in the 1960s, as well as the American Paul McCarthy and the Swiss Roman Signer in the 1990s. Central to these artists is the process/action rather than the finished painting object. The painting process as a work contains a physical and bodily potential and statement, which Dahlgaard believes has not been fully explored."

=== Collections ===
Søren Dahlgaard's work is held in public collections, including KIASMA Museum for Contemporary Art, Museu Arte Rio, Museo National Brasilia, Randers Art Museum, Skovgaard Museum, Statens Kunstfond, and Trapholt Museum of Modern Art.

=== Exhibitions ===
==== 2023 ====
- Collection in Action, Skovgaard Museet, Viborg, Denmark.
- Inflatable Islands, KUNSTEN Museum of Modern Art, Aalborg, Denmark.

==== 2019 ====
- The Migrating Island, Displacement Uncertain Journeys, Geneva, Switzerland.

==== 2018 ====
- Sculpture as Activating Object, Artspace Melbourne, Australia.

==== 2015 ====
- Mobile Island drawing show, Gertrude Contemporary, Melbourne, Australia.

2014

- Growing Vegetables On a Coral Island Hibalhidhoo, CCA Andratx Contemporary Art Center, Mallorca, Spain.
- Dough Portraits, Kunsthalle Bregenz, Austria.

2013

- Dough Portraits, Photographers Gallery, London, England.

2012

- Seeing is Believing, Viborg Kunsthal, Denmark.
- Dough Portraits, The National Art Gallery, Maldives.

2011

- A Hedge is a Lance, Asbæk Gallery, Copenhagen, Denmark.
- The Beauty of Chaos, ECCO – Art Center, Brasilia, Brazil.
- Growing Vegetables On a Coral Island, Hibalhidhoo, Kunsthal Aarhus, Denmark.
- Hibalhidhoo, Galleri Image, Aarhus, Denmark.

2010

- Søren Dahlgaard – The Dough Show, The National Art Gallery of Kosovo.

2009

- Challenging Dough, Stalke Gallery, Denmark.

2008

- The Dough Warrior Landscape Painting, Louisiana Museum of Modern Art, Denmark.
- Dough Portraits, Statens Museum for Kunst, Denmark.

=== Publications ===
- Ed. Raimar Stange, Pirkko Siitari, Rune Gade, Karen McQuaid, Dough Portraits – Søren Dahlgaard, Art Books Publishing, 2015.
- Ed. Else Marie Bukdahl, Lisbeth Bonde and Bodil Johanne Monrad, Søren Dahlgaard – Seeing is Believing, Viborg Kunsthal, 2012.
- Rasheed Araeen and Eliza Tan, Søren Dahlgaard – Growing Vegetables on a Coral Island Hibalhidhoo, Galleri Image, 2011.
- Anders Kold, The Dough Warrior Project, Stalke Galleri, 2008.
- Ed. Judi Lund Finderup & Henrik Holm, Søren Dahlgaard – Dough Portraits, Statens Museum for Kunst / The National Gallery, Denmark, 2008
- Ed Karla Osorio Netto, Aya Kinoshita & Søren Dahlgaard, Søren Dahlgaard – The Beauty of Chaos – expanding painting, ECCO Contemporary Art Center Brasilia, Brazil, 2011. ISBN 978-85-62376-11-5
