= The Mole: Undercover in North Korea =

2020 Danish documentary television series by Mads Brügger

- Muldvarpen – Undercover i Nordkorea
- Genre: Documentary
- Directed by: Mads Brügger
- Countries of origin: Denmark, Sweden, Norway, United Kingdom
- No. of episodes: 3 (2 in English version)

Production
- Production companies: Wingman Media; Piraya Film; DR (co-producer); NRK (co-producer); SVT (co-producer); BBC Storyville (co-producer)

Original release
- Release: 11 October 2020

Related
- Det Røde Kapel

The Mole: Undercover in North Korea is a 2020 documentary miniseries written and directed by Mads Brügger that managed to record plans of large-scale illegal weapon distributions, methamphetamine laboratories, and money laundering. The series follows Ulrich Larsen, called "the Mole", a former chef living on benefits who spends 10 years infiltrating the Korean Friendship Association (KFA). He quickly rises through the ranks and gains the trust of KFA leader Alejandro Cao de Benós from Spain. Cao de Benós tells the Mole that he is looking for possible investors that are willing to invest in North Korea, despite sanctions against the country. Brügger decides to inject into the story a "Mr James" (Jim Latrache-Qvortrup), pretending to be a possible investor.

After a meeting with Cao de Benós about possible sale of drugs and weapons from North Korea, the Mole and Mr. James travel to North Korea, where they sign a contract with North Korea to produce drugs and weapons in another country. Mr James meets the North Koreans officials again in Uganda, where they discuss buying an island in Lake Victoria in Uganda to construct an underground drugs and weapons manufactory, under the disguise of establishing a luxury hotel. The series later won "best documentary" at the Danish Robert Awards in 2021.

The filming of the documentary leads Ulrich to North Korea, and around the world, to initiate negotiations of cross-continental Scud missiles, weapons, and methamphetamine between North Korea and a fake businessman. This exposed how North Korea attempts to avoid the strict sanctions placed against the regime.

== People ==
=== The Mole / Ulrich Larsen ===
Ulrich Larsen – The Mole
- Born: 14 September 1976 (age 50); Zealand, Denmark
- Other name: The Mole
- Occupations: Motivational speaker, retired chef
- Known for: Infiltrating North Korea, exposing North Korean weapons program
- Website: https://themolecph.com/

Ulrich Løvenskjold Larsen (born 14 September 1976), the mole of the documentary, is a former chef, who was forced to retire early due to chronic inflammation in the pancreas, and now lives on government benefits. He watched Brügger's documentary series Det Røde Kapel (The Red Chapel) about North Korea, and became interested in the country. Larsen then joined the Korean Friendship Association (KFA), and spent more than ten years infiltrating the KFA between the years 2010–2021. Posing as a loyal supporter of the North Korean regime, Ulrich Larsen initially started collaborating with the Danish North Korean Friendship Organization, subsequently rising through the ranks of the organization in Denmark and ending up in the inner circle of the International Friendship Association (KFA). Here, Ulrich gained the trust of some of North Korea's most influential supporters in the West. For several years, Ulrich was functioning as the official Scandinavian delegate of the KFA. He started filming the meetings, officially to post them to social media, but with the real intention of offering them to Brügger should he be interested in making a sequel to Det Røde Kapel.

As part of Ulrich Larsen's undercover life, he traveled around Europe to fulfill his obligations within the KFA and became a well-known member of the international community. Larsen initiated a close relationship with the President of the International Friendship Association (KFA), Alejandro Cao de Benós, a special representative of the Foreign Ministry of North Korea who allegedly has direct contact with state officials in North Korea. After years of gaining his trust, Alejandro Cao de Benós entrusts Ulrich with secrets about North Korea and offers him confidential tasks. Through covert recordings of negotiations between regime representatives and the fake businessman, the documentary shows how North Korea is ignoring United Nations (UN) sanctions to trade oil, drugs, and money. Later on, the documentary sees Ulrich reveal his true identity to Alejandro Cao de Benós and Ulrich's unsuspecting wife, for whom Ulrich's double life comes as shocking news.

==== Personal life ====
Ulrich grew up in southern Denmark, close to the German border. Before he left his job as a cook and documented his infiltration work, Ulrich lived with his family in a suburb of Copenhagen.

Larsen lives in a Copenhagen suburb with his wife and children, who did not know about his 10-year-long double-life. He had only told his wife that he was in the friendship association out of curiosity, where he was travelling, but not what he did there, and that he was working with Brügger on a project where he "made fun of" Det Røde Kapel. When he told his wife about his true role, she said she thought he was an idiot, and that it was tough with the lies and the danger he put himself into, and the way he retracted from the family. In October 2020, Ulrich blew his own cover as a mole after exposing North Korea's weapons program, as well as procedures to circumvent international sanctions. In an October 2020 interview with DR in connection with the premier, Larsen said that he had become more vigilant, placing empty drinks cans on door handles in hotels, so he is warned if anybody tries to enter.

Sam Wollaston of The Guardian describes him as "polite" and "unassuming", saying: "His unmemorable 44-year-old face is how I imagine an efit template might be, what you start with before you add distinguishing features. You get to decide who he is. Perfect for blending in."

Ulrich has held lectures and speaking engagements as part of a nationwide speaking tour in Denmark. Larsen shares his story through speeches and lectures to raise awareness about North Korea and share his experience undercover. Ulrich and his family have been in a personal protection program since contact with the North Korean regime.

=== Mr James / Jim Mehdi Latrache-Qvortrup ===
The actor who played Mr James is Jim Mehdi Latrache-Qvortrup, a former French foreign legionnaire and convicted drug dealer.

=== Alejandro Cao de Benós ===
The series features the Korean Friendship Association with its president Alejandro Cao de Benós. He claimed that he was just acting, playing along on Mr James' plans to deal weapons and drugs. In 2022, a federal arrest warrant was issued in the United States District Court, Southern District of New York, after he was charged with conspiracy to violate the International Emergency Economic Powers Act (IEEPA)

=== Annie Machon ===
Annie Machon is a former MI5 intelligence officer and whistleblower who was drafted for her experience by Mads Brügger to debrief the Mole and Mr James.

=== Anders Kristensen ===
The Danish president of Korean Friendship Association.

== Production ==
The documentary is produced by Wingman Media and Piraya Film, with DR, NRK, SVT and BBC Storyville being co-producers.

The documentary contains an actor playing "Mr James", who pretends to be an investor. Mr James, an agent provocateur, seems willing to do illicit deals involving narcotics and weapons.

== Reception ==
Professional ratings
Review scores
Source	Rating
Politiken	5/6 stars
Berlingske	5/6 stars
Jyllands-Posten	5/6 stars
Ekko	5/6 stars
Soundvenue	5/6 stars
Dagbladet	5/6 stars

The documentary earned universal acclaim from Danish newspapers and publications. Politiken gave it five out of six hearts and described it as convincing and nerve-racking, while Berlingske and Jyllands-Posten rated it five out of six stars and called it marvelously entertaining and extremely impressive, respectively.

Thomas Brunstrøm of Berlingske said that "even by Mads Brügger's standard, it's an insane story, with characters so colorful that if The Mole had been fiction, you would probably say it was too unrealistic." Soundvenue also rated it five out of six stars and praised Brügger as currently the most interesting Danish documentarian. Bo Tao Michaëlis of Ekko rated it five out of six stars and wrote that it was brilliantly fascinating from beginning to end, describing it as a "007-movie without fast car chases and hot blondes" and applauding Brügger's decision to pair the anonymous Larsen with the former Foreign Legionary and criminal Latrache-Qvortrup. Norwegian newspaper Dagbladet gave it five out of six stars, writing that it's sensational and among the few documentaries explosive enough to change the world. The Guardian, The Telegraph and The Times described the documentary as extraordinary and absurdly brave.

Ola Kaldager, the former leader of the Intelligence Service of Norway's group E 14, said about Larsen's infiltration: "As an intelligence operation, this is one of the best I have seen." Former coordinator of the UN Panel of Experts on North Korea, Hugh Griffiths said "This film is the most severe embarrassment to Chairman Kim Jong-un that we have ever seen."

Critics of Ulrich's work have said that it stretches beyond the limits of the documentary-genre, and that Ulrich and Mr. James needlessly put themselves in danger.

== Reactions ==
The Swedish and Danish foreign ministers, Ann Linde and Jeppe Kofoed, announced on 12 October 2020 that they would bring the documentary to the attention of the UN Sanctions Committee, and also raise the issues in the European Union.

North Korea, from its embassy in Sweden, denied the allegations made in the documentary and called it a "fabrication".

The intelligence work done in the documentary has been recognized by United Nations who has shown interest in Ulrich Larsen's work.

On 9 September 2021, Chinese officials have said that investigators should not use the documentary as evidence for investigating violations on sanctions since the videos were made through illegitimate means.
