= Korean Paralympics =

Korean Paralympics may refer to:

- 1988 Summer Paralympics, held in Seoul, South Korea
- 2018 Winter Paralympics, held in PyeongChang, South Korea
- South Korea at the Paralympics (IPC code: KOR), Republic of Korea
- North Korea at the Paralympics (IPC code: PRK), People's Democratic Republic of Korea

== See also ==
- Korean Olympics (disambiguation)
