= Dermot Hudson =

British political activist (born 1961)

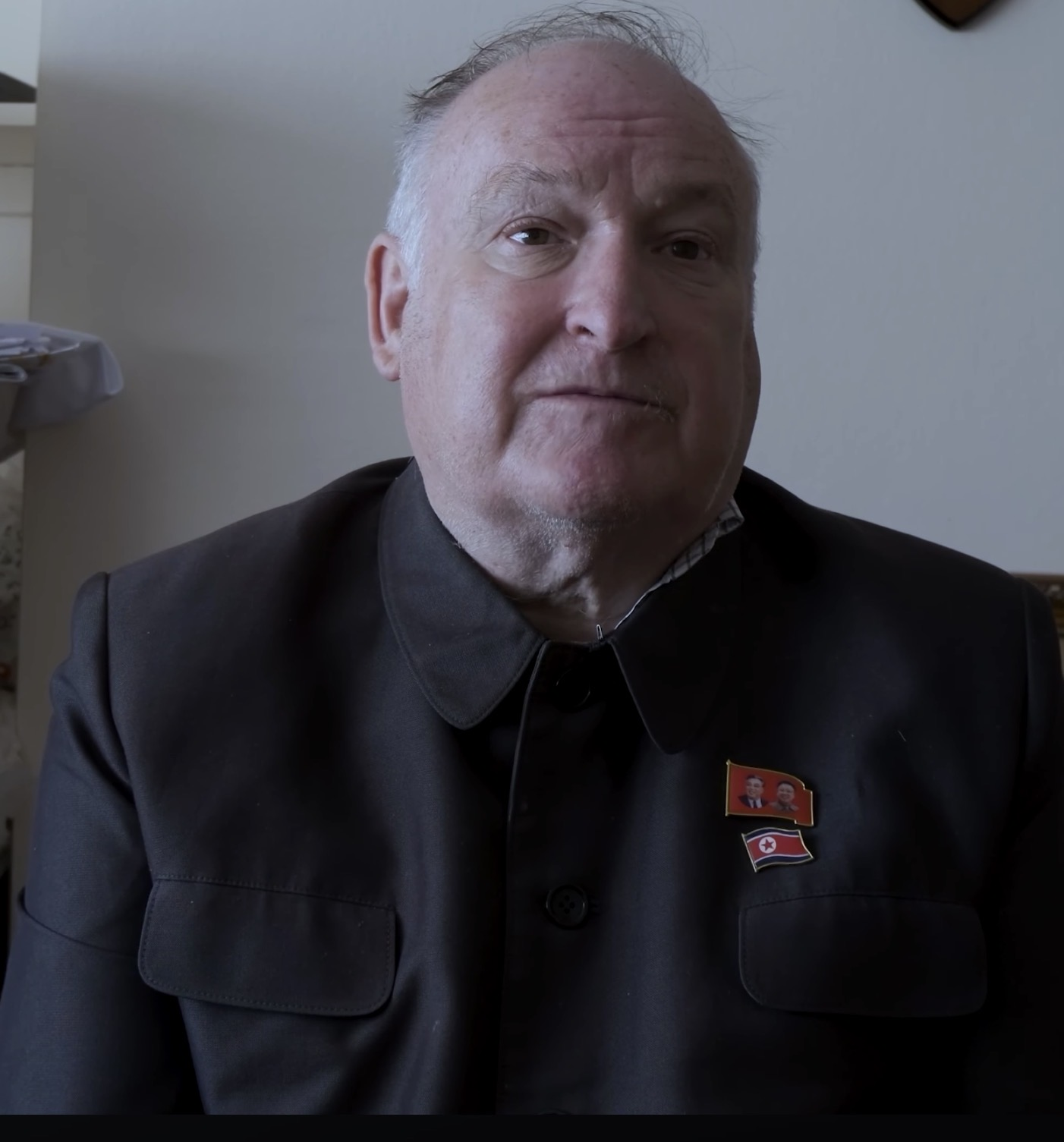
- Dermot Hudson in 2025

Chairman of the British Korean Friendship Association
- Incumbent
- Assumed office 2001
- Preceded by: Position created

Chairman of the British Group for the Study of the Juche Idea
- Incumbent
- Assumed office Sep 1985

Personal details
- Born: 20 July 1961 (age 65) Hammersmith, London, England
- Party: Communist Party of Great Britain (1980–1987); New Communist Party of Britain (1990–1997; 2014–present); Socialist Labour Party (UK) (2001–2003)
- Education: University of Winchester; Korean Association of Social Scientists; University of Greenwich
- Occupation: Communist political activist

Dermot Caradoc Hudson (born 20 July 1961) is a British communist political activist with close relations with North Korea. He is the Chairman of the British Group for the Study of the Juche Idea, Chairman of United Kingdom Korean Friendship Association, and President of the British Association for the Study of Songun Politics. He is a former trade unionist and civil servant.

Hudson has written multiple works on North Korea, such as Behind the Mirror of Lies -The Truth About the Democratic People’s Republic of Korea and The Famine That Never Was. Hudson's works on North Korea have been cited by various academic publications, such as US-Japan-North Korean security relations: Irrepressible Interests by Anthony DiFilippo (2012), Independence, Creativity, Mastery: Juche as Ideology and Theory in Education by Simon Boxley (2025), or The Dynamics of Indonesia and the Democratic People’s Republic of Korea’s Diplomatic Relations by S. Bagus and Y. R. Isjchwansyah (2025).

== Biography ==
=== Early life ===
Hudson was born in London in 1961 in Hammersmith, London. His family were Labour Party members and left-wing activists, and his mother was a subscriber of the Country Standard, a rural newspaper of the Communist Party of Britain. Hudson's father died when he was 11. Hudson spent much of his early years in Winchester, and stayed there to attend the University of Winchester. He also studied in the Greenwich, where he graduated in history. In the 1970s, Hudson developed anti-American and later pro-Soviet views, and joined the Hampshire Young Communist League.

He became a Marxist-Leninist in the 1980s, and took interest in North Korea after he had become disillusioned with increasingly liberalizing Soviet Union. He was a member of the Communist Party of Great Britain in the 1980s, but became increasingly disillusioned with it and began regarding it as revisionist. Hudson visited the Eastern bloc in 1989, where he lost faith in the Soviet bloc as he encountered poverty, beggars, as well as the prevalence of Western culture, including Western music and movies. He blamed Mikhail Gorbachev for the collapse of the USSR, claiming that Gorbachev worked on behalf of the US. He also argued that Soviet decline was caused by the influence of "imperialist bourgeois ideology and culture", such as Pepsi and Madonna; Hudson described the latter as "the most rubbishy aspect of bourgeois imperialist pop culture".

As a student, he discovered Juche, and found its claim to be something more complete and updated than Marxism-Leninism. He first read about North Korea in the second volume of Marxist Governments: A World Survey, and he later found speeches of Kim Il Sung and images from the country in the Woolwich Public Library, as well as an article which claimed that North Koreans paid no rent, which appealed to Hudson, who struggled financially at the time. Hudson would inquire about North Korea amongst the British communist parties, but stated that he was disappointed to see that British communists were "overwhelmingly negative" about Juche.

=== Head of the British KFA ===
Hudson worked as a civic servant who evaluated real estate prices for the Valuation Office Agency, which was also the job of his late father. He also became a trade unionist. In 1992, he visited North Korea for the first time. After coming back, he insisted that there was no famine or mass starvation, and that the country "was functioning normally". In the late 1990s, he discovered the Korean Friendship Association and contacted and subsequently met Alejandro Cao de Benos. In 2001, Hudson became the chairman of the British branch in Korean Friendship Association, and received an official endorsement of North Korea for the position.

He became an author of various DPRK-related publications together with other Korean Friendship Association officials, such as Alejandro Cao de Benos in Spain, and Francesco Alarico della Scala in Italy. Hudson's works have been translated into Czech and Serbian. In 2014, Hudson defended North Korea in a phone interview with Sunday Times. As a result, he was fired from his job as a civil servant. Later in 2014, Hudson was described by North Korea as "anointed friend". Hudson wrote poetry in honor of DPRK, such as Echoes of Gunshots from Pochonbo, and has also become the editor-in-chief of the Red Banner of Songun publication.

In April 2016, Hudson received a doctorate in socio-political science from the Pyongyang-based Korean Association of Social Scientists, after submitting a thesis titled In Defence of Songun. In 2017, North Korea awarded him with the Second Class Order of Friendship, an official state decoration. In 2019, the North Korean state media produced a documentary about Hudson titled “Confessions of a Foreigner”. Between 1992 and 2014, he had visited North Korea nine times, and has since then become a regular visitor to Pyongyang. By 2020, he had visited North Korea eighteen times, and by 2025, twenty.

Alex Meads, who joined the British KFA in the 2010 when he was 14 and left it in 2019, sold his story about the KFA and Hudson to an American website NK News. Meads claimed that Hudson became increasingly paranoid after the death of Kim Jong Il in 2011 and the execution of Jang Song-thaek and 2013, and stated that the atmosphere in the organisation had become "cult-like" and controlling, with no criticisms of North Korea or its ideology being allowed. He also claimed that Hudson implored all members to refer to Kim Jong Un as "the Fearless General of Mount Paektu who is like a tiger to his enemies". According to Meads, Hudson prohibited KFA members from wearing jeans, stating that they were worn in the Eastern Bloc in the late 80s as a sign of rebellion; he also held anti-LGBT and criticized a male member for wearing wear women’s clothing. KFA UK denied Meads' claims, stating that he was expelled after a complaint against him and that he was given a chance to defend himself first.

In his publication Passcode to the Third Floor, Thae Yong-ho wrote that Hudson became a celebrity in North Korea, stating that "the North Korean media report on him nearly every week." When Hudson's mother died in 2015, the North Korean government offered him three thousand euros for the funeral; Hudson refused the money, arguing that they are better off "serving the Korean revolution". However, Hudson was eventually persuaded by high-ranking Pyongyang officials to accept the donation. According to Thae, Pyongyang would afterwards implement a rule prohibiting North Korean officials from accepting donations from Hudson, stating that he "is living in very difficult economic circumstances"; Thae recalled that this regulation was strictly obeyed.

== Bibliography ==
- Behind the Mirror of Lies – The Truth About the Democratic People's Republic of Korea (2011)
- Peoples Korea Smashes Counterrevolution (2014). ISBN 1291689605, 978-1291689600.
- In Defence Of Songun (2017). ISBN 1326494635, 978-1326494636.
- In Defence of Juche Korea! (2018). ISBN 0244329699, 978-0244329693.
- Victory Of Juche Korea Is A Science (2018). ISBN 0244111545, 978-0244111540.
- Travels In The Land Of Juche Korea, 1992–2017: Personal recollections of visiting the Democratic People's Republic of Korea – travel notes and a bit of autobiographical stuff (2018). ISBN 0244433925, 978-0244433925.
- The Famine That Never Was – the Democratic People's Republic of Korea in the ‘Arduous March‘ period: The myth of famine in the DPRK exposed (2020). ISBN 1716430887, 978-1716430886.
- The Great Conspiracy Against People's Korea (November 2021). ISBN 9781794808652.
- Anti-Revisionist Fortress of Juche- People's Korea and the Struggle against Revisionism (April 2025) ISBN 9781326520496.

== See also ==
- Robert Egan
- Kim Myong-chol
- Francesco Alarico della Scala
- Alejandro Cao de Benós
- Robert Griffiths
- Andy Brooks
