= Swedish-Korean Association =

Swedish friendship association with North Korea

The Swedish-Korean Association (SKA) (Swedish: Svensk-koreanska föreningen, Korean: 스웨리예-조선 친선협회) is a Swedish friendship association with North Korea.

It was formed in 1969, and since 1972 its aims also includes to "spread knowledge of what is happening in Korea, support the efforts for reunification, and work for recognition of the DPRK."

The association declares open solidarity for the North Korean regime. The country's form of government is described as "uncompromisingly Socialist". The SKA especially supports North Korea's right to exist, and its right to defend itself from outside interference. It maintains friendly relations with the North Korean state.

They organize study meetings and conferences, rallies and workshops, and exhibitions. Trips to North Korea are also arranged. Humanitarian aid was organized during the North Korean famine, Juche study seminars are held, and books are translated and published. Since 1970 the association publishes the quarterly magazine Korea-information (조선통보). The association has roughly 300 members. In 2011 the Vice Chairman was interviewed by state radio after the death of Kim Jong-il. The association is based in Stockholm and is independent of any political parties.

== Chairpersons ==
- Torsten Brännström (1969–1971)
- Birgitta Sevefjord (1971–1972)
- Torsten Brännström (1972–1973)
- Evert Kumm (1973–1975)
- Karen Lundberg (1975–1976)
- Gustav Lorentzon (1976–1980)
- Nils-Eric Gustafsson (1980–1986)
- Bert Andersson (1986–1994)
- Thomas Rönström (1994–2004)
- Christer Lundgren (2004–Present)

== See also ==
- Korean Friendship Association
- Sweden–Kampuchea Friendship Association
- Sweden in the Korean War
- North Korea–Sweden relations
