= Korean Olympics =

Korean Olympics may refer to:

- 1988 Summer Olympics, held in Seoul, South Korea
- 2018 Winter Olympics, held in Pyeongchang, South Korea
- Korea at the Olympics (IOC code: COR), the unified joint united Koreas at the Olympics
- South Korea at the Olympics (IOC code: KOR) the Republic of Korea
- North Korea at the Olympics (IOC code: PRK) the Democratic People's Republic of Korea

== See also ==
- Korean Paralympics (disambiguation)
