= Costanzo Preve =

Italian philosopher and political theorist

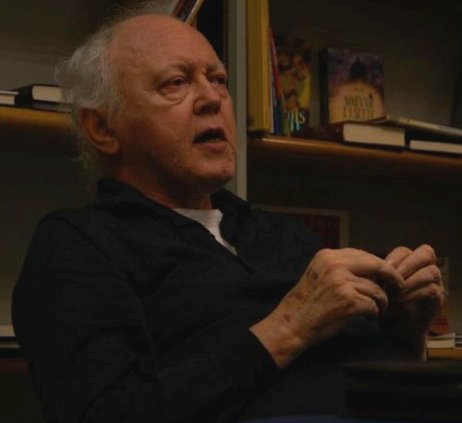
- Costanzo Preve on 22 April 2010
- Born: 14 April 1943; Valenza, Piedmont, Kingdom of Italy
- Died: 23 November 2013 (aged 70); Turin, Piedmont, Italy

Education
- Education: University of Turin

Philosophical work
- Era: 20th-century philosophy
- Region: Western philosophy
- School: Revival of German idealism Western Marxism
- Main interests: Marxist philosophy Ancient Greek philosophy Politics
- Notable ideas: Communitarism; Universalism; Anti-capitalism

Costanzo Preve (14 April 1943 – 23 November 2013) was an Italian philosopher and a political theoretician.

Preve is widely considered one of the most important anti-capitalist European thinkers and a renowned expert in the history of Marxism. His thought is based on the Ancient Greek and idealistic tradition philosophy under the influence of Johann Gottlieb Fichte, Georg Wilhelm Friedrich Hegel and Karl Marx. He is author of many essays and volumes about philosophical interpretation, communitarianism and universalism.

== Biography ==
Born in Valenza, Preve studied philosophy, political science and ancient and modern Greek in Turin, Paris and Athens. He worked as a high school teacher from 1967 to 2002 and was engaged first in the Italian Communist Party (PCI). He then got close to Proletarian Democracy, a party created in 1975 which opposed to the historic compromise between the PCI and the Christian Democracy. After the dissolving of the PCI following the 1989 fall of the Berlin Wall, Preve undertook a critical review of his own positions held in the precedent decades. He gave lectures for and took part in some of the cultural activities of the Anti-Imperialist Camp, a union of international leftist anti-imperialist activists who have received much attention from the media because of their critical stand against American imperialism and Zionism. Since 2005, he wrote for geopolitical journal Eurasia.

Preve was initially influenced by Marxist philosopher Louis Althusser before turning himself towards Georg Lukács. He rejected the important workerism current (or autonomist Marxism) during the 1960–1970s. In the 1990s, Preve returned to Althusser and criticized economism and orthodox Marxism based on a teleological philosophy of history inspired by Hegel. As did Althusser in his latter work on "random materialism" (matérialisme aléatoire), Preve insisted on the place of contingency in history and considers the class contrast between the bourgeoisie and the proletariat to be a historical passing form specific to a certain period of the capitalist mode of production. Preve conceived of the 1960s as a rupture in history in much the same way that the appearance of the proletariat in the 19th century had been as capitalism entered a new phase. However, Preve insists against Althusser on the young Marx's theory of alienation and on his theory on human nature and provocatively considered Marxism as the last phase of German idealism. Preve has also insisted on the unprecedented power of the sole hyperpower, that is the United States, warning against cultural imperialism. He criticized Antonio Negri and Michael Hardt's Empire (2000).

Preve assigned four masters to Marx, namely Epicurus (to whom he dedicated his thesis, Difference of natural philosophy between Democritus and Epicurus, 1841) for his materialism and theory of clinamen; Jean-Jacques Rousseau, from which come his idea of egalitarian democracy; Adam Smith, from whom came the idea that the grounds of property is labour; and finally Georg Wilhelm Friedrich Hegel.

Preve was an atheist. On 23 November 2013, Preve died in Turin, where he lived.

== Works ==
- La classe operaia non va in paradiso: dal marxismo occidentale all'operaismo italiano (in AA.VV., Alla ricerca della produzione perduta). 1982, Dedalo
- Cosa possiamo chiedere al marxismo (in AA.VV., Il marxismo in mare aperto). 1983, Franco Angeli
- La filosofia imperfetta. Una proposta di ricostruzione del marxismo contemporaneo. 1984, Franco Angeli
- La teoria in pezzi. La dissoluzione del paradigma teorico operaista in Italia (1976–1983). 1984, Dedalo
- La ricostruzione del marxismo fra filosofia e scienza (in AA.VV., La cognizione della crisi. Saggi sul marxismo di Louis Althusser). 1986, Franco Angeli
- Vers une nouvelle alliance. Actualité et possibilités de développement de l'effort ontologique de Bloch et de Lukàcs (in AA.VV. Ernst Bloch et György Lukács. Un siècle après). 1986, Actes Sud [Verdinglichung und Utopie. 1987, Sendler]
- La rivoluzione teorica di Louis Althusser (in AA.VV., Il marxismo di Louis Althusser). 1987, Vallerini Editore
- Viewing Lukàcs from the 1980s. 1987, The University of Chicago Press
- La passione durevole. 1989, Vangelista
- La musa di Clio vestita di rosso (in AA.VV., Trasfromazione e persistenza. Saggi sulla storicità del capitalismo). 1990, Franco Angeli
- Il filo di Arianna. Quindici lezioni di filosofia marxista. 1990, Vangelista
- Il marxismo ed il problema teorico dell'eguaglianza oggi (in AA.VV., Egalite/Inegalite). 1990, QuattroVenti
- Il convitato di pietra. 1991, Vangelista
- L'assalto al cielo. Saggio su marxismo e individualismo. 1992, Vangelista
- Il pianeta rosso. Saggio su marxismo e universalismo. 1992, Vangelista
- L'ideologia Italiana. Saggio sulla storia delle idee marxiste in Italia. 1993, Vangelista
- The dream and the reality. The spiritual crisis of western Marxism (in AA.VV., Marxism and spirituality. An international anthology). 1993, Bengin and Gavey
- Il tempo della ricerca. Saggio sul moderno, il postmoderno e la fine della storia. 1993, Vangelista
- Louis Althusser. La lutte contre le sens commun dans le mouvement communiste "historique" au XX siècle (in AA.VV, Politique et philosophie dans l'œuvre de Louis Althusser). 1993, Presses Universitaires de France
- L'eguale libertà. Saggio sulla natura umana. 1994, Vangelista
- Oltre la gabbia d'acciaio. 1994, Vangelista, (+ Gianfranco La Grassa)
- Il teatro dell'assurdo (cronaca e storia dei recenti avvenimenti italiani), 1995, Punto rosso, (+ Gianfranco La Grassa)
- Una teoria nuova per una diversa strategia politica, 1995, Punto rosso, (+ Gianfranco La Grassa)
- Un elogio della filosofia. 1996, Punto Rosso
- La fine di una teoria. Il collasso del marxismo storico del Novecento. 1996, Unicopli, (+ Gianfranco La Grassa)
- Il comunismo storico novecentesco (1917–1991). 1997, Punto Rosso
- Nichilismo Verità Storia. Un manifesto filosofico della fine del XX secolo. 1997, CRT, (+ Massimo Bontempelli)
- Gesù uomo nella storia, Dio nel pensiero. 1997, CRT, (+ Massimo Bontempelli)
- Il crepuscolo della profezia comunista. A 150 anni dal "Manifesto". 1998, CRT
- L'alba del Sessantotto. Una interpretazione filosofica. 1998, CRT
- Marxismo, Filosofia, Verità. 1998, CRT
- Destra e sinistra. La natura inservibile di due categorie tradizionali. 1998, CRT
- La questione nazionale alle soglie del XXI secolo. 1998, CRT
- Le stagioni del nichilismo. Un'analisi filosofica ed una prognosi storica. 1998, CRT
- Individui liberati, comunità solidali. Sulla questione della società degli individui. 1998, CRT
- Contro il capitalismo, oltre il comunismo. Riflessioni su di una eredità storica e su un futuro possible. 1998, CRT
- La fine dell'Urss. Dalla transizione mancata alla dissoluzione reale. 1999, CRT
- Il ritorno del clero. La questione degli intellettuali oggi. 1999, CRT
- Le avventure dell'ateismo. Religione e materialismo oggi. 1999, CRT
- Un nuovo manifesto filosofico. Prospettive inedite e orizzonti convincenti per il pensiero. 1999, CRT, (+ Andrea Cavazzini)
- Hegel Marx Heidegger. Un percorso nella filosofia contemporanea. 1999, CRT
- Scienza, politica, filosofia. Un'interpretazione filosofica del Novecento. 1999, CRT
- I secoli difficili. Introduzione al pensiero filosofico dell'Ottocento e del Novecento. 1999, CRT
- L'educazione filosofica. Memoria del passato – Compito del presente – Sfida del futuro. 2000, CRT
- Il bombardamento etico. Saggio sull'interventismo umanitario, l'embargo terapeutico e la menzogna evidente. 2000, CRT
- Marxismo e filosofia. Note, riflessioni e alcune novità. 2002, CRT
- Un secolo di marxismo. Idee e ideologie. 2003, CRT
- Le contraddizioni di Norberto Bobbio. Per una critica del bobbianesimo cerimoniale. 2004, CRT
- Marx inattuale. Eredità e prospettiva. 2004, Bollati Boringhieri
- Verità filosofica e critica sociale. Religione, filosofia, marxismo. 2004, CRT
- Dove va la destra? Dove va la sinistra? (+ Giano Accame). 2004, Edizioni Settimo Sigillo
- Comunitarismo Filosofia Politica. 2004, Noctua
- L'ideocrazia imperiale americana. 2004, Edizioni Settimo Sigillo
- Filosofia del presente. 2004, Edizioni Settimo Sigillo
- Filosofia e Geopolitica. 2005, Edizioni all'insegna del Veltro, (introduction by Tiberio Graziani)
- Del buon uso dell'universalismo. 2005, Edizioni Settimo Sigillo, (introduction by Carlo Gambescia)
- Dialoghi sul presente. Alienazione, globalizzazione, Destra/Sinistra, atei devoti. Per un pensiero ribelle (+ Alain de Benoist and Giuseppe Giaccio). 2005 Controcorrente
- Marx e gli antichi greci. 2005, Petite Plaisance, (+Luca Grecchi)
- Il popolo al potere. Il problema della democrazia nei suoi aspetti storici e filosofici. 2006, Arianna Editrice, (introduction by Giuseppe Giaccio)
- Verità e relativismo. Religione, scienza, filosofia e politica nell'epoca della globalizzazione. 2006, Alpina (introduction by Franco Cardini)
- Elogio del comunitarismo. 2006, Controcorrente
- Il paradosso De Benoist. 2006, Edizioni Settimo Sigillo, (introduction by Carlo Gambescia)
- Storia della dialettica. 2006, Petite Plaisance
- Storia critica del marxismo. 2007, Edizioni Città del Sole, (introduction by André Tosel)
- Storia dell'etica. 2007, Petite Plaisance
- Hegel antiutilitarista. 2007, Edizioni Settimo Sigillo, (introduction by Carlo Gambescia)
- Storia del Materialismo. 2007, Petite Plaisance
- Una approssimazione al pensiero di Karl Marx. Tra materialismo e idealismo. 2007, Il Prato (introduction by Diego Fusaro)
- Ripensare Marx. Filosofia, Idealismo, Materialismo. 2007, Editrice Ermes
- Un trotzkismo capitalistico? Ipotesi sociologico-religiosa dei Neocons americani e dei loro seguaci europei (in AA.VV., Neocons. L'ideologia neoconservatrice e le sfide della storia). 2007, Il Cerchio
- Alla ricerca della speranza perduta. 2008, Settimo Sigillo, (+ Luigi Tedeschi)
- La quarta guerra mondiale. 2008, Edizioni all'insegna del Veltro
- Il marxismo e la tradizione culturale europea, 2009, Petite Plaisance
- Nuovi signori e nuovi sudditi. Ipotesi sulla struttura di classe del capitalismo contemporaneo, 2010, Petite Plaisance (with Eugenio Orso)
- Logica della storia e comunismo novecentesco. L'effetto di sdoppiamento, 2010, Petite Plaisance (with Roberto Sidoli)
- Filosofia della verità e della giustizia. Il pensiero di Karel Kosík, 2012, Petite Plaisance (with Linda Cesana)
- Lettera sull'umanesimo, 2012, Petite Plaisance
- Una nuova storia alternativa della filosofia. Il cammino ontologico-sociale della filosofia, 2013, Pistoia, Petite Plaisance.
