= Den 11. time =

- Created by: Mikael Bertelsen
- Presented by: Mikael Bertelsen; Mads Brügger
- Theme music composer: Goodiepal (opening theme)
- Country of origin: Denmark
- Original language: Danish
- No. of seasons: 3
- No. of episodes: 126

Original release
- Network: DR2
- Release: 5 February 2007 – 21 May 2008

Den 11. time (styled as "den 11. time"; English: The eleventh hour) was a Danish television talk show on DR2. It aired at 23:00 on DR2 weekly on Monday, Tuesday and Wednesday. The show was hosted by Mikael Bertelsen, and his editor, Mads Brügger would occasionally step in as host for a given programme.

Den 11. time included guests such as the then-Danish Minister of Culture, Brian Mikkelsen, but also had foreign guests such as Phillip Blond or even Mikhail Gorbachev, who stated in a letter to the presenters that it was one of the most interesting interviews he ever did. Sometimes the programme would air live, but other times it would be pre-recorded, often to be able to get the subtitles on for non-Danish guests. Though, at times an interpreter in the studio provided the translations.

It last broadcast on 21 May 2008, despite large popularity.

== Guests ==
Selected guests include (see Danish Wikipedia for dates):

- Bjarke Ingels (architect)
- Olafur Eliasson (artist)
- Jesse Jane (porn actress)
- David Lynch (movie director, transcendental meditation practitioner)
- Leif Ove Andsnes (Norwegian pianist)
- Per Arnoldi (artist)
- Anker Jørgensen (former Danish prime minister)
- Mike Sheridan (DJ, born 1991) vs Else Marie Pade (electronic music composer, born 1924)
- Erwin Neutzsky-Wulff (author, born 1949)
- Bryan Ferry (English new wave musician)
- Nicolas Winding Refn (movie director, eight appearances on the show)
- Naja Marie Aidt (poet)
- Geert Wilders (Dutch politician)
- Lars Norén (Swedish playwright, born 1944)
- Jesper Christensen (actor, born 1948)
- Klaus Rifbjerg (author, born 1931)
- Ole Christian Madsen (movie director, script writer)
- Helle Helle (author)
- May Andersen (model)
- Per Nørgård (composer, 1932–2025)
- Hilary Hahn (American violinist)
- Tomas Espedal (Norwegian writer)
- Gry Bay (actress)
- Hiroshi Ishiguro (Japanese engineer)
- Betty Dodson (American sex educator)
- Søren Dahlgaard (visual artist)
