= The Ambassador (2011 film) =

- Theatrical release poster
- Directed by: Mads Brügger
- Produced by: Peter Engel; Carsten Holst
- Starring: Mads Brügger
- Cinematography: Johan Stahl Winthereik
- Production company: Zentropa
- Distributed by: Drafthouse Films
- Release dates: 5 October 2011 (Denmark); 20 January 2012 (Sundance)
- Running time: 93 minutes
- Country: Denmark
- Languages: Danish; English; French
- Box office: $28,102 (US)

The Ambassador (Danish: Ambassadøren) is a 2011 Danish documentary film created and directed by Danish filmmaker and journalist Mads Brügger. The film was nominated for the Grand Jury Prize at the 2012 Sundance Film Festival, ultimately losing to The House I Live In.

== Premise ==
Mads Brügger goes undercover as the Liberian diplomat and businessman Mr. Cortzen, impersonating a fake version of himself, with the object of building a match factory in the Central African Republic; in reality he is uncovering corruption linked to diplomatic title brokerage and blood diamonds.

== Controversy ==
As a result of the film's controversial themes, the Liberian government threatened legal action against Brügger. The Dutch businessman Willem Tijssen, who according to the movie brokered the diplomatic title, unsuccessfully filed an injunction to stop screening of the film at the International Documentary Film Festival in Amsterdam. According to Danish media, Willem Tijssen is pursuing legal actions in Denmark, for having been filmed with a hidden camera.

== Reception ==
The Ambassador was well received by critics. On the review aggregator website Rotten Tomatoes, 71% of 38 critics' reviews are positive, with an average rating of 6.8/10. Metacritic, which uses a weighted average, assigned the film a score of 67 out of 100, based on 17 critics, indicating "generally favorable" reviews.

Karsten Kastelan of The Hollywood Reporter wrote: "It is highly watchable, clearly (and unabashedly) exploitative and often offensive – but it undeniably unearths some very uncomfortable truths about Central Africa in general, corruption in particular and individual greed on top of it. And – even though the director denies it – it might have been financed in part with the sale of blood diamonds."

Marc Savlov of The Austin Chronicle was critical of the lack of clarity in Brügger's "grand intent" when capturing his African escapades on film, saying it "may occasionally twang too near the abyss for some consciences", but praised it for being "a gut-twisting narrative, occasionally painful to view, but one that, admittedly, is extremely well-conceived." Alison Willmore of The A.V. Club gave it an overall B grade. She wrote that the film "deserves serious points for boldness, though not cohesiveness" in capturing its subject matter and peppering some "amusing moments" along the way, but later added that "the [film's] tone and structure seem a little strained by the danger in which the filmmaker increasingly puts himself, and the indifference to human life exuded by some of those he meets."

Chris Cabin of Slant Magazine commended Brügger for successfully documenting Central Africa's handling of diplomacy and politics but was disappointed in the lack of "pointedly outlandish" moments that add context into why people are given these positions of power, saying: "It tempers the politics down, for better or worse, and makes The Ambassador more of a lopsided, if irrefutably involving, act of gonzo reportage, part absurdist how-to guide on becoming a diamond smuggler, part outsider tour of a truly lawless land infested with poverty and incessant corruption." Mark Jenkins of NPR felt that Brügger lacked a clear source when expounding his alter ego's "racialist baloney" and was limited by his narrative progression due to being an outsider, concluding that: "The Central African Republic is a violent and often lawless country, which makes The Ambassador a brave undertaking. Yet the movie lacks enough context for the general viewer, or the Mike Wallace-style showdown that would provide a big finish to all the filmmaker's skulking. The bold Brugger gets some interesting stuff, but it doesn't quite add up to an expose."
