= Eating with the Enemy =

2010 book by Robert Egan

Eating with the Enemy: How I Waged Peace with North Korea from My BBQ Shack in Hackensack
- Author: Robert Egan, Kurt Pitzer
- Publisher: St. Martin's Press
- Publication date: April 27, 2010
- ISBN: 9780312571306

Eating With the Enemy is a book by Robert Egan and Kurt Pitzer. It was published in 2010 and describes Egan's friendship with Han Song-ryol, the North Korean deputy ambassador to the United Nations. Egan was contacted by the Koreans in New York, who had known about his relationship with Le Quang Khai—a Vietnamese Communist diplomat who eventually defected to the United States. Egan and Han established a relationship, including fishing trips and meals at Egan's restaurant "Cubby's" in Hackensack, New Jersey, in order to provide a diplomatic and commercial back channel in the United States where national diplomacy continuously failed.

The New York Times reviewed Egan's story, calling it "a boisterous if improbable book about barbecue diplomacy."
