= The Red Chapel =

2009 Danish documentary film

- Directed by: Mads Brügger
- Produced by: Peter Engel
- Cinematography: René Sascha Johannsen
- Edited by: René Sascha Johannsen
- Production companies: Danmarks Radio; Zentropa Productions
- Distributed by: Kino Lorber Films
- Release dates: May 4, 2009 (Hot Docs); August 30, 2009 (Denmark)
- Running time: 88 minutes
- Country: Denmark
- Language: Danish

The Red Chapel (Danish: Det Røde Kapel) is a 2009 Danish documentary film directed by Mads Brügger. It chronicles the visit of Brügger and two Danish comedians who were adopted from South Korea, Jacob Nossell and Simon Jul, to North Korea under the pretense of a small theatre troupe on a cultural exchange. This is also the first time the two comedians have ever visited North Korea. The entire trip is a ruse: the goal of the trio is actually to portray the absurdity of life that they will lead in North Korea. An additional emotional aspect is that Jacob Nossell has spastic paralysis and North Korea has been accused of disposing of disabled people. The film won Best Nordic Documentary at Nordisk Panorama 2009 and Best Foreign Documentary at the 2010 Sundance Film Festival where it was included in the Official Selection. It is filmed and edited by René Sascha Johannsen.

The film features roughly the same contents as the 4-part documentary series Det Røde Kapel.

== Synopsis ==
The authorities demand much control over the performance of the theatre troupe, and try to use it for propaganda purposes. The film crew plays along, but among themselves and in the voice-over they are critical of the regime.

== Reception ==
Los Angeles Times reviewer Mark Olson called it "shocking, funny and wildly outrageous" and "a real find". The New York Times reviewer Neil Genzlinger found it sloppy and thought it had "no revelations to offer".

== See also ==
- Disability in North Korea
- The Idiots, another Danish film playing on social discomfort with disability
- On the Art of the Cinema, Kim Jong Il's art manifesto featured in the film

== Footnotes ==
Awards
Preceded by Rough Aunties	Sundance Grand Jury Prize: World Cinema Documentary; 2010	Succeeded by Hell and Back Again
