= North Korea at the Paralympics =

- IPC code: PRK
- Medals: Gold 0 Silver 0 Bronze 0 Total 0

Summer appearances
- 2012; 2016; 2020–2024

Winter appearances
- 2018; 2022–2026

North Korea made its Paralympic Games debut at the 2012 Summer Paralympics in London, sending a single wildcard representative (Rim Ju-song, a left arm and left leg amputee) to compete in swimming.

== Context ==
While South Korea has been taking part in the Paralympics since 1968, the North long ignored the Games. Persons with disabilities in North Korea (with the exception of veterans) were reported in 2006 by The Daily Telegraph to be locked away in camps, and "subjected to harsh and sub-human conditions". Vitit Muntarbhorn, the United Nations' special rapporteur on human rights, reported in 2006 that North Koreans with disabilities were excluded from the country's showcase capital, Pyongyang, and kept in camps where they were categorised by disability. Defectors reported the existence of "collective camps for midgets", whose inmates were forbidden from having children.

The United Nations reports that the government is "beginning to consider welfare for the disabled". The charity Handicap International reports that it has been operating in North Korea since 1999 assisting the Korean Federation for the Protection of Disabled People, and the International Committee of the Red Cross reported in 2006 that it had assisted in setting up a rehabilitation centre for disabled people in Pyongyang.

Until 2012, North Korea had completely ignored the Paralympic Games. For a few years already, its propaganda had projected an outward image of a superior socialist system under which even disabled people can prosper. Participating in the Paralympic Games would be the next step. The Associated Press in 2012 reported the existence of the Taedonggong Cultural Center for the Disabled in the capital, Pyongyang.

== 2012 debut ==
North Korea obtained provisional membership of the International Paralympic Committee in March 2012, entitling the country to take part in the Games. It reportedly aimed to field athletes in track and field, swimming and table tennis in particular. "Twelve athletes, coaches, and officials from the North Korean Paralympic team" received training in Beijing prior to the Games.

Ultimately, however, it was announced that the country's delegation would consist in a single athlete, Rim Ju Song, who would compete in the men's freestyle swimming (S6 disability category) and breaststroke (SB5). Rim had "lost his left arm and left leg, and suffered significant injuries to his right leg and foot in an accident on a construction site when he was five years old". The British Embassy in Pyongyang provided assistance, including financial support, to enable him to obtain training and participate in the Games. He received a wildcard invitation to the Paralympics.

Rim swam in heat 2, which he completed in 47.87 seconds, 17.89 seconds behind heat winner Lorenzo Perez (from Cuba). Rim's time was the slowest of all nineteen swimmers in the first round, 10.68 seconds behind second-last Reagan Wickens (Australia).

== Full results for North Korea at the Paralympics ==
Name	Games	Sport	Event	Score	Rank
Rim Ju Song	2012 London	Swimming	Men's 50m freestyle S6	47.87	17th (of 17)
Kim Chol Ung (Guide: Ri Kum Song)	2016 Rio de Janeiro	Athletics	Men's 1500m T11	disqualified	not ranked
Song Kum Jong	2016 Rio de Janeiro	Athletics	Women's discus F56-57	12.08	12th (of 14)

== Medals ==
=== Games ===
Summer Olympic Games

Games	Gold	Silver	Bronze	Total
(United Kingdom) London 2012	0	0	0	0
(Brazil) Río de Janeiro 2016	0	0	0	0
(Japan) Tokyo 2020	–	–	–	–
(France) Paris 2024	–	–	–	–
TOTAL	0	0	0	0

Winter Olympic Games

Games	Gold	Silver	Bronze	Total
(South Korea) Pyeongchang 2018	0	0	0	0
(China) Beijing 2022	–	–	–	–
TOTAL	0	0	0	0

== See also ==
- North Korea at the Olympics
- Olympic Committee of the Democratic People's Republic of Korea
