= Alejandro Cao de Benós =

Spanish-North Korean political activist

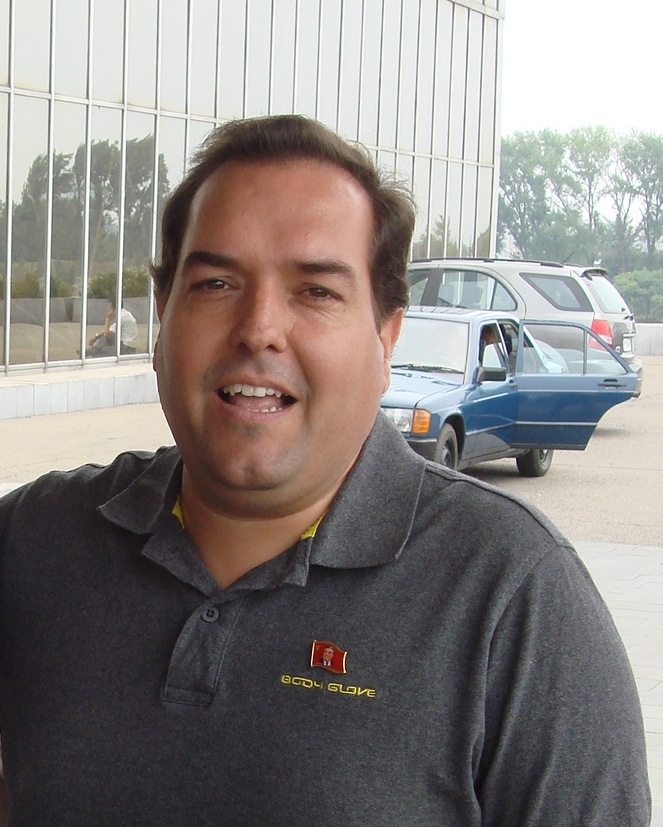
- Alejandro Cao de Benós in Pyongyang in 2012

President of the Korean Friendship Association
- Incumbent
- Assumed office 8 August 2000
- Preceded by: Position created

Personal details
- Born: Alejandro Cao de Benós de Les y Pérez; 24 December 1974 (age 51) Tarragona, Spain
- Party: Workers' Party of Korea (honorary, since 2002)

Military service
- Allegiance: North Korea
- Branch/service: Korean People's Army
- Rank: Junior Lieutenant

- Alejandro Cao de Benós
- Hangul: 조선일
- Hanja: 朝鮮一
- RR: Jo Seonil
- MR: Cho Sŏnil

Alejandro Cao de Benós de Les y Pérez (born 24 December 1974) is a Spanish-born North Korean political activist. He is a Special Representative of the Foreign Ministry of North Korea. He is, according to himself, also the Special Delegate of North Korea's Committee for Cultural Relations with Foreign Countries. He is wanted by the US Federal Bureau of Investigation for conspiracy to violate the International Emergency Economic Powers Act (IEEPA).

He is also the founder, president, and only salaried member of the Korean Friendship Association (KFA). He has been an advocate of North Korea since 1990. His Korean name, Cho Sun-il ("One Korea"), is self-given but not a legal name as he travels using his Spanish passport. He is an honorary member of the ruling Workers' Party of Korea and the Korean People's Army, being the first Westerner to be part of both organisations. He has lived in Tarragona and Barcelona, working as an IT consultant. In April 2022, the U.S. Department of Justice charged Cao de Benós "with conspiring to violate United States sanctions on the Democratic People’s Republic of Korea."

== Family origins ==
Cao de Benós comes from a Spanish noble family. His paternal ancestors were the barons of Les, marquesses of Rosalmonte and counts of Argelejo, Grandees belonging to the highest-ranking members of the Spanish nobility, who were linked for centuries to the Spanish Army and Navy. Many of them were defenders of Carlism and Francoism. Although Cao de Benós's grandfather was born rich, he lost his inheritance and ended up working as a guard for Repsol-Butano.

== Korean Friendship Association activities ==
Cao de Benós founded the Korea Friendship Association (KFA) in 2000, purchasing and establishing his privately owned domain name which whilst claiming to be officially sanctioned is privately owned and registered in his name. All official government and ministerial sites of North Korea have the .kp domain and, given the WHOIS record for KFA's website points towards it being the personally owned domain of Cao de Benós, there is doubt about its claim to be the "official web page of DPR of Korea" and thus Cao de Benós's claims of his actual status in North Korea's hierarchy.

Cao de Benós has regularly visited Pyongyang, assisting with press pass application and acting as a translator for the foreign press (constantly under supervision of local authorities) and helping to schedule business meetings. Cao de Benós acts for a commission as an intermediary in such meetings and in line with having no official paid employment is not paid any base salary. Cao de Benós is featured in the documentaries Friends of Kim, The Propaganda Game and The Mole: Undercover in North Korea.

== Pyongyang Cafe ==
In July 2016, Cao de Benós founded a bar called Pyongyang Cafe in Tarragona, which is decorated with North Korean propaganda posters and features regular talks on subjects such as tourism. The café closed to the public in March 2017 and became a members-only establishment for KFA members.

== Criticism ==
Cao de Benós has been the subject of widespread criticism from the Western press for, among other things, trying to restrict freedom of expression of journalists. He has expelled members of the Korea Friendship Association for "disrespect". He has also been accused of threatening and intimidating journalists critical of North Korea. Andrew Morse of ABC News visited North Korea in 2004, at the invitation of the Association. Morse was accused of using sensationalist language to describe North Korean collective farms. When asked about the incident, Cao de Benós said, "Mr. Morse broke almost every rule specified beforehand, including the DPRK law. So after several warnings that he completely ignored, appropriate measures were taken." The "appropriate measures" included unauthorized entry and search of journalist Morse's Pyongyang hotel room, including destruction of his laptop and recordings; Cao de Benós compelled Morse to write a letter of apology under duress, in exchange for being granted permission to leave the country.

While he is authorized to "promote and develop cultural relations," Cao de Benós has been criticized for fraudulently representing himself as a North Korean government employee and the KFA as an official North Korean entity, neither of which are true.

Cao de Benós has been criticized for charging more than twice as much as other tour organizers to bring filmmakers, artists and tourists to North Korea. In exchange for these higher prices, he promises exclusive access, although the attractions on his itinerary are comparable to those on any other tour. Furthermore, Cao de Benós has historically failed to secure permits and permissions for even standard, relatively highly-accessible attractions.

In 2020, an unpublished report by the UN Panel of Experts denounced Cao de Benós for violating UN sanctions by facilitating a joint venture between the DPRK and KFA. A federal arrest warrant was issued in the United States District Court, Southern District of New York on January 27, 2022, after he was charged with conspiracy to violate the International Emergency Economic Powers Act (IEEPA). He is wanted by the FBI from January 2022 for working with an American citizen to illegally provide cryptocurrency and blockchain technology services to the DPRK. For that, he was arrested on 30 November 2023 in Madrid but he was released soon after.

== Awards and honors ==
Cao de Benós can be seen wearing his North Korean decorations in a picture taken alongside Yang Hyong-sop.

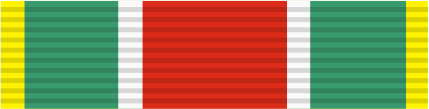

== See also ==
- Kim Myong-chol
- Robert Egan
- Dermot Hudson
- The Mole: Undercover in North Korea, a documentary in which Ulrich Larsen, an undercover mole, covertly dupes Cao de Benós and infiltrates his activities within the Korean Friendship Association.
