= Swimming at the 2012 Summer Paralympics – Men's 50 metre freestyle S6 =

Event at the 2012 Summer Paralympics

Men's 50 metre freestyle S2 at the XIV Paralympic Games
- Venue: London Aquatics Centre
- Dates: 4 September 2012
- Competitors: 17 from 12 nations

Medalists
1st place, gold medalist(s)		Xu Qing	China
2nd place, silver medalist(s)		Lorenzo Perez Escalona	Cuba
3rd place, bronze medalist(s)		Tao Zheng	China

The men's 50 metre freestyle S6 event at the 2012 Paralympic Games took place on 4 September at the London Aquatics Centre.

Three heats were held, heat one with five competitors, the rest of the heats with six competitors. The swimmers with the eight fastest times advanced to the final.

== Heat ==
=== Heat 1 ===
Results of heat 1
Rank	Lane	Name	Nationality	Time	Notes
1	4	Sebastian Iwanow	Germany	31.29	Q
2	6	Yuan Tang	China	31.99	Q
3	5	Darragh McDonald	Ireland	33.15	Q
4	3	Anders Olsson	Sweden	33.88	
5	2	Reagan Wickens	Australia	37.19	

=== Heat 2 ===
Results of heat 2
Rank	Lane	Name	Nationality	Time	Notes
1	4	Lorenzo Perez Escalona	Cuba	29.98	Q, AM
2	5	Matthew Haanappel	Australia	32.58	Q, OC
3	3	Sascha Kindred	Great Britain	33.36	
4	2	Iaroslav Semenenko	Ukraine	33.53	
5	6	Matthew Whorwood	Great Britain	33.91	
6	7	Ju Song Rim	North Korea	47.87	

=== Heat 3 ===
Results of heat 3
Rank	Lane	Name	Nationality	Time	Notes
1	4	Xu Qing	China	30.11	Q
2	5	Tao Zheng	China	30.33	Q
3	3	Kyosuke Oyama	Japan	32.04	Q
4	6	Adriano de Lima	Brazil	33.18	
5	2	Aaron Rhind	Australia	34.74	
6	7	Daniel Londono	Colombia	34.98	

=== Final ===
Results of the finals
Rank	Lane	Name	Nationality	Time	Notes
1st place, gold medalist(s)	5	Xu Qing	China	28.57	WR
2nd place, silver medalist(s)	4	Lorenzo Perez Escalona	Cuba	30.04	
3rd place, bronze medalist(s)	3	Tao Zheng	China	30.06	
4	6	Sebastian Iwanow	Germany	30.83	
5	7	Kyosuke Oyama	Japan	31.94	
6	1	Matthew Haanappel	Australia	32.13	OC
7	2	Yuan Tang	China	32.20	
8	8	Darragh McDonald	Ireland	33.26	
