= Det Røde Kapel =

- Country of origin: Denmark
- No. of episodes: 4

Original release
- Network: DR
- Release: 2006

Det Røde Kapel (Danish: The Red Chapel) was a Danish television show on the channel DR2, about the fictional theatre group Det Røde Kapel, which consists of three Danish comedians, who want to perform a comedy/variety show in North Korea. The show is notable for actually taking place in North Korea.

Two of the comedians, Simon Jul and Jacob Nossell, were both adopted to Denmark from South Korea. The filming of Det Røde Kapel was their first visit to Korea. At one point they were allowed to cross what is technically the border to South Korea at a table in a conference room, to visit the country where they were born.

While the point of the trip is not to mock the regime of North Korea, the three comedians are able to act in ways that might quickly have raised suspicion in Western countries, but due to the isolation of the inhabitants, and extremely low or non-existent exposure to Western media, certain themes such as irony and subtle mockery are not seen as offensive. Their ability to communicate between each other in Danish, which is understood by no one else, also allows them certain freedom.

Along with the ongoing challenge of getting their theatre show performed, the show also follows the three around certain "tourist friendly" landmarks in North Korea in or close to the capital Pyongyang, where they are taken under strict supervision and guidance by officials. While it is difficult to judge the truthfulness of the situation, their female guide throughout their journey seems to develop strong affection for the group, acting very sad when they leave, and expressing hope that they will meet again. One of the Danish comedians, Simon Jul, was even offered a career as an actor in North Korean films that would be screened at international film festivals.

During their trip, all of their camera footage has to be delivered to North Korean censoring officials, and is only returned to them after screening.

The title refers to Rote Kapelle, a communist spy unit that operated in Nazi Germany.

The footage from Det Røde Kapel is also used in the 2010 documentary film The Red Chapel.
