= Kim Myong-chol =

Zainichi Korean activist (born 1944)

Kim Myong-chol (김명철, born 1944) is a Korean writer and editor based in Japan and an unofficial spokesperson of North Korea, regularly travelling to Pyongyang and around the world portraying the North Korean leadership and politics. He was a close associate of Kim Jong-il. His articles have appeared in many publications, including Asia Times and Asia Research. Among the several books that he has written is Kim Jong-il — Military Strategy for Reunification. His books have been banned in South Korea. Currently, he is the Executive Director of CFKAP (Center for Korean-American Peace), based in Tokyo, Japan. He holds North Korean nationality and a North Korean diplomatic passport.

He has claimed variously that "North Korea has all types of nuclear bombs and warheads, atomic, hydrogen and neutron, and the means of delivery, short-range, medium-range and long-range, putting the whole of the continental US within effective range" and that "[u]nlike all the previous wars Korea fought, a next war will be better called the American War or the DPRK-US War because the main theater will be the continental US, with major cities transformed into towering infernos." Additionally, he has threatened Australia with similar results, stating "[i]f Australia becomes part of American manipulation against North Korea, North Korea reserve the right to strike back on Australia".

== Works ==
- Myong Chol, Kim (2001). Kim Jong Il: Day of having Korea reunified: North Korean scenario for war and peace (PDF). Pyongyang: Foreign Languages Publishing House. OCLC 276274813.
- Myong Chol, Kim (2003). US–The Empire Of Terrorism (PDF). Pyongyang: Foreign Languages Publishing House.
- — (2001). "Kim Jong Il's Military Strategy for Reunification". Comparative Strategy. 20 (4): 303–420. doi:10.1080/713839467. ISSN 0149-5933. S2CID 153683201.
- — (13 February 2004). "Kim Jong Il's nuclear strategy". Association for Asia Research. Archived from the original on 26 April 2004.
- — (6 October 2006). "Kim's message: War is coming to US soil". Speaking Freely. Asia Times. Archived from the original on 18 October 2006.

== See also ==
- Alejandro Cao de Benós
- Robert Egan
- Dermot Hudson
