= Robert Egan =

American restaurateur

- Occupation: Restaurateur
- Known for: Diplomacy between USA and North Korea
- Website: cubbysbarbeque.com

Robert "Bobby" Egan is an American restaurateur and an interlocutor between the government of the Democratic People's Republic of Korea (North Korea) and the United States. He is best known for providing public diplomacy services, political consultancy, and barbecue catering to the North Korean government.

== Early life and education ==
Egan is the son of Walter Egan, a former U.S. Army bomb disposal technician who served in the Korean War and later went to work as a tar roofer. He grew up in Fairfield, New Jersey. According to Egan, he mowed lawns for drug trafficker and securities fraudster Bobby Vesco and was, at one point, approached by the FBI to become an informant.

As a youth, Egan experienced problems with drug addiction. He graduated in 1976 from West Essex High School.

== Career ==
=== Cubby's ===
In 1982, after several years of working as a roofer, Egan opened Cubby's, a roadside barbecue restaurant in Hackensack, New Jersey. Egan partnered with longtime friend, Leonard Wehrle, on the establishment, as well as Wehrle's parents. (Note: In the early 2000s, Egan bought-out the Wehrle's share of Cubby's.)

In 1996 Egan filed a civil rights lawsuit against the City of Hackensack, claiming police officers had attempted to extort free food and money from his restaurant through a protection racket. Though his claims were ultimately dismissed, the city settled a separate claim Egan had made against police for $300,000. Egan continued to be a strong critic of city police chief Ken Zisa. When Zisa was arrested for insurance fraud in 2010, Egan programmed Cubby's electronic billboard to scroll “POLICE CHIEF KEN ZISA ARRESTED FOR FRAUD HASTA LA¬VISTA CHIEF ZISA GOOD BYE GOOD RIDDANCE".

Egan was offered the opportunity by the North Korean government to open a branch location of Cubby's in the DPRK in the mid-1990s but declined the offer.

=== Diplomacy ===
According to Egan, Cubby's became popular with Vietnamese diplomats assigned to that nation's permanent mission to the United Nations in the 1980s. During this time Egan was still living with his parents. In his autobiography, Egan says that his father at one point discovered, in his room, communist literature given to him by staff of the Vietnamese delegation and expelled him from the family home.

Egan's interactions with Vietnamese officials continued through the 1980s and, in 1990, he traveled to Vietnam for the first time. Two years later Vietnamese diplomat Le Quang Khai attempted to defect to the United States. Though the U.S. government declined his request for asylum, Egan provided housing to the diplomat and helped generate enough negative publicity that the decision was reversed.

In the early 1990s, Egan was introduced to members of the North Korean delegation to the United Nations by his Vietnamese contacts. According to Egan, the North Koreans requested he help them improve their reputation and standing within the United States. Egan arranged for the diplomats to attend a New York Nets game and to tour the team's locker room. Later, during the 2003 FIFA Women's World Cup, Egan catered for the DPRK women's soccer team and also attempted to secure a sponsorship for the team with a sports drink manufacturer. Egan's relationship with the DPRK delegation became increasingly cordial and he began to frequently organize hunting and fishing trips for North Korean diplomats. Egan traveled to North Korea in 1994 and, again, in 1996. To provide cover for the trips, he was appointed – by the DPRK government – president of a non-existent entity known as the USA-DPRK Trade Council. In 2002 Egan contacted the New York Times at the behest of the DPRK mission to arrange an exclusive interview with North Korean ambassador Han Song Ryol, about that country's nascent nuclear weapons program. Egan also arranged, via a friend who was an oral surgeon, for a secure operating theater for Han when the ambassador needed to have a dental operation. During this time he made additional trips to the DPRK and offered advice on negotiating with the United States to the North Korean government, though the seriousness with which this advice was considered has been a matter of dispute.

According to Egan, in addition to providing political advice and catering services to the North Korean UN delegation, he has also regularly collected information about DPRK diplomatic staff for U.S. intelligence agencies. Following the death of Kim Jong Il, Egan advised North Korean officials against the elevation of Kim Jong Un to a higher leadership post in the DPRK. He later opined that "I think His Excellency [Kim Jong-il] will be remembered as someone who opened the door to the West, and that’s something we didn’t have under his father".

==== Other contacts ====
According to Egan, he was also friends with Nizar Hamdoun, the Iraqi ambassador to the United Nations under Saddam Hussein; Hamdoun and Egan's daughters reportedly took karate lesson together.

==== Criticism ====
Jack Pritchard, a former staff member at the National Security Council who has been involved in negotiations in which Egan has participated, has criticized him for "inserting himself into affairs of state – in the diplomacy and negotiations". According to Pritchard, he stopped associating himself with Egan after he learned Egan had been taping their conversations, a claim which Egan has confirmed.

Egan himself claims he has been threatened "repeatedly" by the U.S. government with prosecution under the Logan Act and the Trading with the Enemy Act.

=== Writing ===
In 2010 Egan co-wrote Eating with the Enemy with Kurt Pitzer. The book, which details his diplomatic maneuvers, was published in 2010. Eating with the Enemy was optioned to HBO and turned into a screenplay by Pat Healy. James Gandolfini, who had been slated to star in the movie, died before production could begin and work on the movie was suspended.

== Personal life ==
John McCreary, a former U.S. Senate committee staffer who once interviewed Egan, has described him as friendly and generous and said "he just makes friends easily". In an article on Egan, the Washington Post described him as "intense, garrulous and profane" and said he resembles a character from The Sopranos.

== See also ==
- Kim Myong-chol
- Alejandro Cao de Benós de Les y Pérez
- Dermot Hudson
- North Korea–United States relations
