= North Korea at the 2016 Summer Paralympics =

- IPC code: PRK

in Rio de Janeiro
- Competitors: 2 in 1 sports
- Medals: Gold 0 Silver 0 Bronze 0 Total 0

Summer Paralympics appearances (overview)
- 2012; 2016; 2020–2024

North Korea competed at the 2016 Summer Paralympics in Rio de Janeiro, Brazil, from 7 September to 18 September 2016.

== Athletics ==
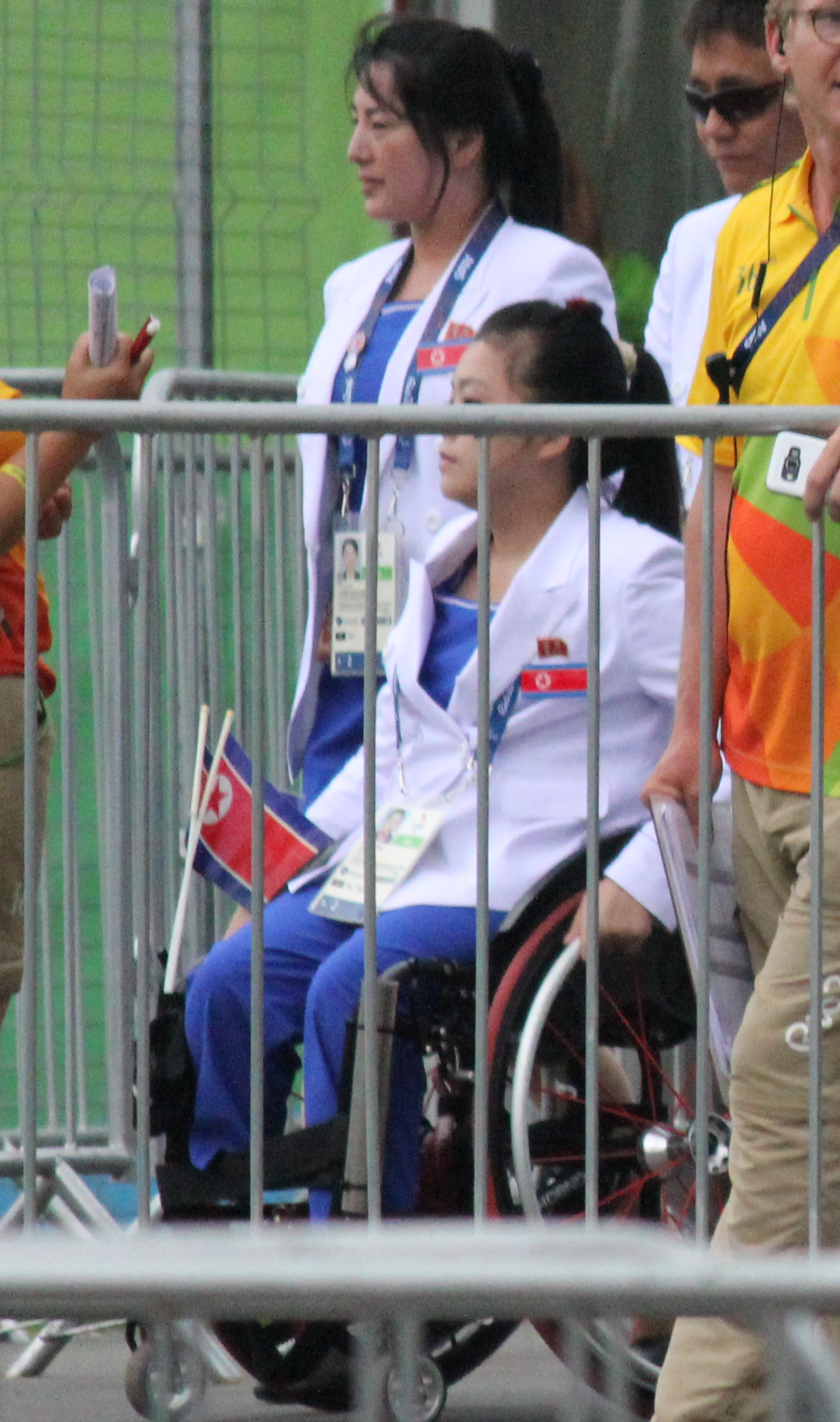
Song Kum-jong about to board the bus to attend the Opening Ceremonies of the Rio Games.

Two North Korean athletes participated at the Rio Games.

Men's Track

Athlete	Events	Heat		Final	
Athlete	Events	Time	Rank	Time	Rank
Kim Chol Ung(김철웅) (Guide – Ri Kum Song)	1500 m T11	Disqualified		did not advance	

Women's Field

Athlete	Events	Result	Rank
Song Kum Jong	Discus F56-57	12.08	12

== See also ==
- North Korea at the 2016 Summer Olympics
