= North Korea at the 2012 Summer Paralympics =

- IPC code: PRK

in London
- Competitors: 1 in 1 sport
- Flag bearer: Rim Ju-Song
- Officials: 9
- Medals: Gold 0 Silver 0 Bronze 0 Total 0

Summer Paralympics appearances (overview)
- 2012; 2016; 2020–2024

North Korea made its Paralympic Games début at the 2012 Summer Paralympics in London, United Kingdom, from August 29 to September 9.

North Korea obtained provisional membership of the International Paralympic Committee in March 2012, entitling the country to take part in the Games. It reportedly aimed to field athletes in track and field, swimming and table tennis in particular. "Twelve athletes, coaches, and officials from the North Korean Paralympic team" received training in Beijing prior to the Games.

Ultimately, however, it was announced that the country's delegation would consist in a single athlete, Rim Ju-Song, who would compete in the men's freestyle swimming (S6 disability category) and breaststroke (SB5). Rim had "lost his left arm and left leg, and suffered significant injuries to his right leg and foot in an accident on a construction site when he was five years old". The British Embassy in Pyongyang provided assistance, including financial support, to enable him to obtain training and participate in the Games. He received a wildcard invitation to the Paralympics.

== Context ==
While South Korea has been taking part in the Paralympics since 1968, the North long ignored the Games. In the early 21st century, it was reported that persons with disabilities in North Korea (with the exception of veterans) were locked away in camps, and "subjected to harsh and sub-human conditions". Vitit Muntarbhorn, the United Nations' special rapporteur on human rights, reported in 2006 that North Koreans with disabilities were excluded from the country's showcase capital, Pyongyang, and kept in camps where they were categorised by disability. Defectors reported the existence of "collective camps for midgets", whose inmates were forbidden from having children. However the charity Handicap International reports that it has been operating in North Korea since 1999 assisting the Korean Federation for the Protection of Disabled People(KFPD,조선장애자보호련맹), and the International Committee of the Red Cross reported in 2006 that it had assisted in setting up a rehabilitation centre for disabled people in Pyongyang.

By 2008, the United Nations reported that the government was "beginning to consider welfare for the disabled". Yahoo news reported in 2012 that a Paralympic cultural centre exists in Pyongyang.

== Swimming ==
Men

Athletes	Event	Heat		Final	
Athletes	Event	Time	Rank	Time	Rank
Rim Ju-Song	50m freestyle S6	47.87	17	did not advance	

== See also ==
- North Korea at the Paralympics
- North Korea at the 2012 Summer Olympics
