= Korean Friendship Association =

Spain-based friendship association with North Korea

- Abbreviation: KFA
- Formation: November 2000
- Purpose: Official government cultural liaison agency for North Korea
- Location: Spain
- Region served: World
- Members: 17,000
- Official language: English
- President: Alejandro Cao de Benós de Les y Pérez
- Affiliations: Government of North Korea; World Anti-Imperialist Platform (Belgian branch)
- Website: korea-dpr.com
- Remarks: Hymn: "Song of National Defense"

The Korean Friendship Association (KFA, Spanish: Asociación de Amistad con Corea; Korean: 조선과의 친선협회) is a Spain-based friendship association with North Korea. The KFA was officially registered in November 2000, but had existed in Spain since 1990. It operates in 120 countries and has an Official Delegate in 34 countries.

Its president, Spanish citizen Alejandro Cao de Benós de Les y Pérez, is the only person paid a salary. Fees collected by the KFA are generally deposited in accounts in his name around Europe.

== Activities ==
Compared with other North Korea friendship associations, the KFA has been described as more radical.

The KFA pages provide North Korean related material, including tourism tips and political essays, and it is possible to hear views from a North Korean perspective. The KFA Forum site is hosted and administered in Europe and gives links to Korean language teaching sites.

The KFA denies violations of human rights in North Korea and disputes the existence of North Korean concentration camps.

The stated objectives of the KFA are to promote the well-being of all members and to promote friendship between members of the KFA worldwide.

=== Objectives ===
The stated objectives of the KFA are:

- Show the reality of North Korea to the world.
- Defend the independence and socialist construction in North Korea.
- Learn from the culture and history of the Korean People
- Work for the peaceful unification of the Korean Peninsula.

The KFA organizes travel delegations to North Korea. Travel is according to experts a primary motivation of membership in KFA: partakers in trips are offered privileged service.

== Structure ==
The KFA is the largest friendship association with North Korea. It operates in 120 countries. There is an Official Delegate in 34 countries. The KFA is licensed by the North Korean government and is well-funded and supported. The organization is coordinated well "to a certain degree", according to NK News.

The national associations under the KFA do not receive official funding and operate "as far less than consulates, just slightly more than fan clubs". They do not have many functions to support the government of North Korea: they do not support the regime monetarily and do not gather intelligence.

Official Delegates are responsible for the activities in their country and secretaries appointed by the delegates. Above the Official Delegates, the "International Organization Committee" consisting of the President, the International Counselor and an International Organization Secretary who control and direct the activities of the KFA worldwide.

- President: Alejandro Cao de Benós de Les y Pérez
- International organization secretary: Mana Sapmak
- International communication secretary: Carlos Luna
- International Self-Elected Secretariat: Cory Ray Pope Giles-d'Leeuw
- International commissar: Trever Aritz
- Some of the most active members are Dermot Hudson, the Official Delegate in the United Kingdom who has been a part of KFA since its beginning, and Trevor Spencer, the Official Delegate in Canada who is an active political writer and commentator.
- Only one person has four countries as Zone delegate, Ulrich Larsen from Denmark. Larsen is the Zone delegate in Scandinavia, meaning that he is in charge of Denmark, Finland, Norway, and Sweden. Larsen is known for making films about North Korea on YouTube for propaganda use. In October 2020 it was unveiled that Larsen had been working undercover in the KFA for ten years to uncover the secret criminal activities that North Korea and Alejandro Cao de Benós are using the KFA for.
- Both Hudson and Larsen had been awarded medals by the North Korean government.

== Criticism ==
NK News describes the KFA as "one of the DPRK's primary tools of soft power within its global propaganda network".

In 2005 journalist David Scofield of Asia Times called members of KFA "useful idiots" and described the organization as follows:

The group's activities include "information" seminars where the enlightened benevolence of Kim's rule is championed, all part of its "alternative" view of the North. The ragged wretched displays of poverty and starvation are edited out and the voice of North Koreans not in the direct employ of Kim Jong-il are conspicuously absent. In place of uncomfortable reality, the KFA offers vacation photos of "their" North Korea taken during recent, state-supported visits, complete with bowling, golf, amusement parks and Karaoke with young female party members. Members write glowing pieces, oblations celebrating Kim Jong-il's wise rule. No starving people, torture, summary execution, penury or despair in the Korean Friendship Association's North Korea. Just golf, great meals and evenings in the company of Kim Jong-il's beauties.

A 2015 investigation by NK News found the commercial practices and integrity of the KFA to be in question.

According to Hazel Smith of Cranfield University, KFA associations have lost much of their original role as part of an international socialist movement. Today, they are reduced to serving domestic purposes of North Korea.

The documentary The Mole: Undercover in North Korea, by Danish film maker Mads Brügger, was released in 2020. It tells the story of Ulrich Larsen, an unemployed chef who infiltrated the KFA and came into contact with KFA president, Alejandro Cao de Benós, and North Korean government officials. The film shows North Korean officials discussing how to evade sanctions in order to export weapons.

== See also ==
- Politics of North Korea
- Propaganda in North Korea
- Cultural diplomacy
- Public diplomacy
- Chongryon
- Swedish-Korean Association
- British Council
- Alliance Française
