= Eurasia, Rivista di Studi Geopolitici =

- Categories: Geopolitics
- Frequency: Quarterly
- Publisher: Edizioni all'Insegna del Veltro
- Founded: 2004; 22 years ago
- Country: Italy
- Language: Italian
- Website: www.eurasia-rivista.com
- ISSN: 1828-0692

Eurasia is an Italian quarterly journal of geopolitics, founded in 2004. It was run by Tiberio Graziani until December 2011, after which directionship was taken by Claudio Mutti, who also acts as publisher.

== Editorial philosophy ==
Eurasia states its goal as "to promote, stimulate and spread research and geopolitical science in the national and international scientific community, as well as to sensitize readers on Euro-Asian themes on political, intellectual, military, economic and information topics." The perspective takes in not only international relations strictly speaking, but aims to "bring to the attention of specialized professionals the importance of rediscovering the spiritual unity of Eurasia," although the magazine declares that it represents "no particular academic direction." It furthermore publishes "analyses regarding geoeconomics, as a new autonomous science of geopolitics, and geofinance, in order to identify methodologies that animate economic and financial strategies on a planetary scale (both as dominant nations as well as large powerful economies) and the opportunities that can arise for the weakest nations; while not overlooking studies and reflections regarding the delicate topic of security interpreted according to the criteria of geostrategy".

== Editor ==
Since December 2011, the editor in chief of “Eurasia” has been Claudio Mutti. (Note: Former leader of the Italian section of Jean Thiriart's Jeune Europe and member of the "Nazi-Maoist" group Lotta di Popolo. Claudio Mutti is also founder of Edizioni all'Insegna del Veltro, which published, among others, books by Robert Faurisson, Julius Evola, Corneliu Codreanu, Savitri Devi and Johann von Leers) The new editorial staff of "Eurasia" is composed by Aldo Braccio, Fabio Falchi, Enrico Galoppini, Alessandro Lattanzio, Matteo Pistilli, Lorenzo Salimbeni, Stefano Vernole, Antonio Grego (Moscow correspondent), Giacomo Gabellini (cartographer). It saw, in January 2012, the new entrance into its ranks of Giovanni Armillotta, journalist and expert in geopolitics and Afro-Asian countries, as well as managing director and chief editor of the journal Africana. Many editors of the magazine are also essayists. Two of the current editors are also editors of the online journal/political movement Stato & Potenza (State & Power). The new management has included in the Scientific Committee new members as Bruno Amoroso, Falco Accame, Franco Cardini, Alberto Hutschenreuter, Luigi de Anna, Antonino Galloni and Claudio Moffa. Instead some other members - Sergio Romano, Armen Oganesyan, Alfredo Canavero, Come Carpentier de Gourdon, Carlos Pereyra Mele and Miguel Barrios - have left the Scientific Committee after Mutti's taking-on of direction.

== Structure ==
Each issue of the magazine has about 250 pages and is made up of five sections: Editorial (always signed by the editor in chief), Continents (essays on various subjects), Dossier (collection of essays dedicated to a specific topic in each issue), Interviews and Reviews. Many other articles – originals, exclusive translations or selections from the Internet – generally shorter than those in the magazine, have been published on the website.

== Seminars and conferences ==
The magazine organizes conferences around Italy. Since 2008 these have focused on specific programs, annual cycles of "Seminars of Eurasia". The conference saw the participation of representatives of the Italian and international academic and diplomatic representatives of embassies and consulates as China, Russia, Kazakhstan, Belarus, Hungary, Uzbekistan.

== Issues of the magazine published ==
=== 2012 ===
- 4/2012 Islamism against Islam? (XXVIII)
- 3/2012 The geographical pivot of history (XXVII)
- 2/2012 The Mediterranean between Eurasia and the West (XXVI)
- 1/2012 Eurasian Union is born (XXV)

=== 2011 ===
- 3/2011 BRICS: the building blocks of the new order (XXIV)
- 2/2011 Geopolitics and constitutions (XXIII)
- 1/2011 The Mediterranean-Central Asian hinge (XXII)

=== 2010 ===
- 3/2010 USA: hegemony and decline (XXI)
- 2/2010 Italy: 150 years of a great little power (XX)
- 1/2010 Russia and the multipolar system (XIX)

=== 2009 ===
- 3/2009 Africa (XVIII)
- 2/2009 Palestine (XVII)
- 1/2009 NATO (XVI)

=== 2008 ===
- 3/2008 Indio-Latin America in the multipolar system (XV)
- 2/2008 The time of the Continents (XIV)
- 1/2008 Iran (XIII)

=== 2007 ===
- 4/2007 Geopolitics and international law (XII)
- 3/2007 The Indio-Latin America (XI)
- 2/2007 Between Russia and the Mediterranean (X)
- 1/2007 Between the Union and the other (IX)

=== 2006 ===
- 4/2006 Geopolitics and migration (VIII)
- 3/2006 The new Asia (VII)
- 2/2006 The India (VI)
- 1/2006 China (V)

=== 2005 ===
- 3/2005 The Mediterranean (IV)
- 2/2005 Russia and its neighbors (III)
- 1/2005 Islam (II)

=== 2004 ===
- 1/2004 Turkey (I)

== See also ==
- List of magazines in Italy
