= Mads Brügger =

Danish filmmaker (born 1972)

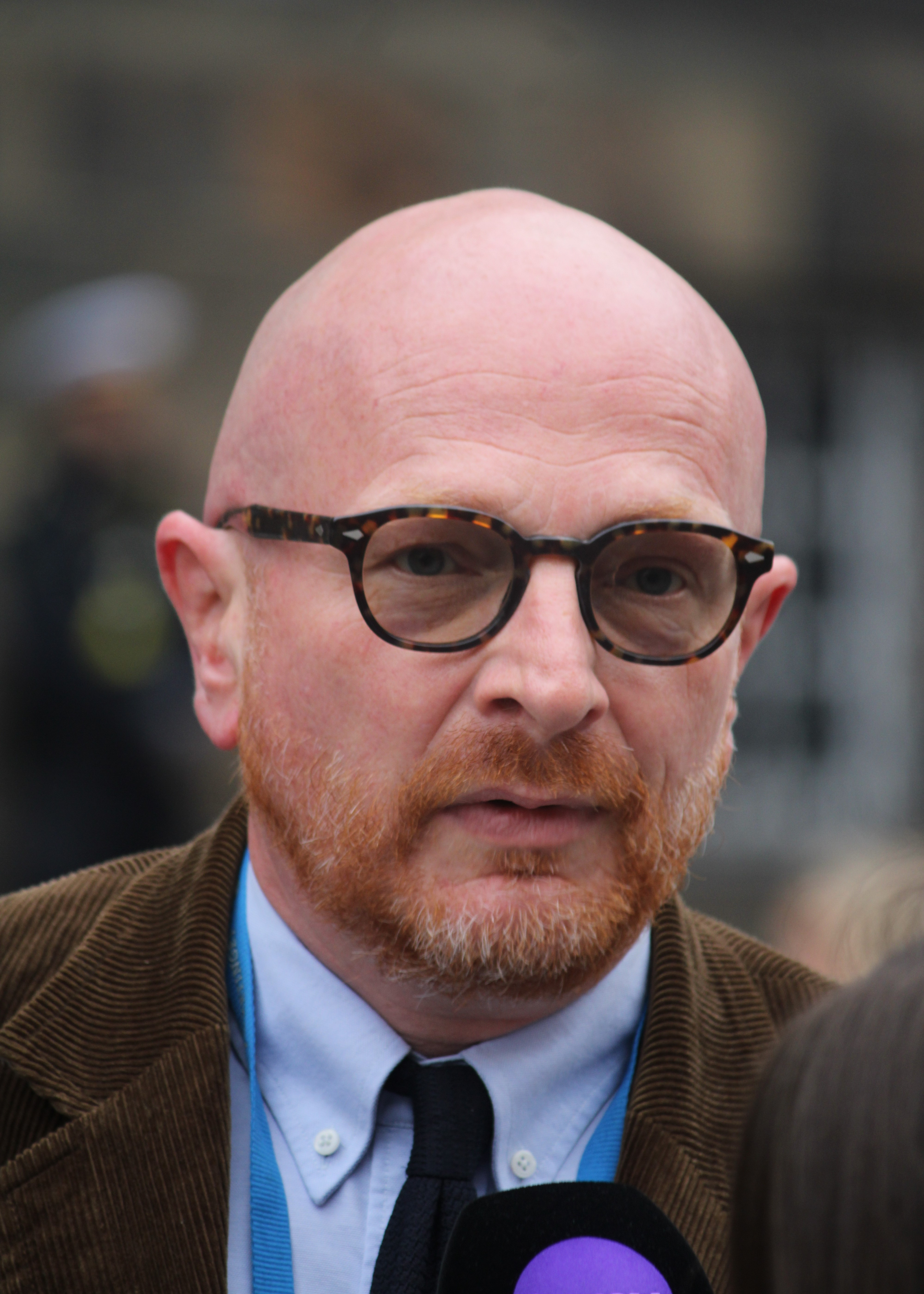
- Brügger in 2025
- Born: 24 June 1972 (age 54); Denmark
- Occupation: Filmmaker
- Years active: 2001–present
- Known for: The Ambassador; The Mole: Undercover in North Korea

Mads Brügger Cortzen (Danish: [ˈmæs ˈpʁœkɐ]; born 24 June 1972) is a Danish filmmaker and TV host.

== Career ==
=== Film ===
Brügger's first two projects, the documentary series Danes for Bush and the feature The Red Chapel, filmed in the United States and North Korea, respectively, are satirical looks at each of the two nations.

In October 2011, he released a new documentary, The Ambassador, about the trading of diplomatic titles in Africa. Brügger impersonated a Liberian ambassador by purchasing a new identity on the black market and then proceeded to expose the ease with which people holding diplomatic titles can exploit the gem trade.

As result of the revelations in the documentary, the government of Liberia took legal steps to prosecute Brügger and other people involved in the project, due to the embarrassment his work was perceived to have caused the nation. However, as of July 2012, the Danish government has not been presented with a formal demand for Brügger's extradition.

Brügger directed Cold Case Hammarskjöld, which premiered at the 2019 Sundance Film Festival. The documentary focuses on the death of UN Secretary-General Dag Hammarskjöld in a 1961 plane crash. In January 2019, Brügger reported on his findings in three articles published in The Guardian.

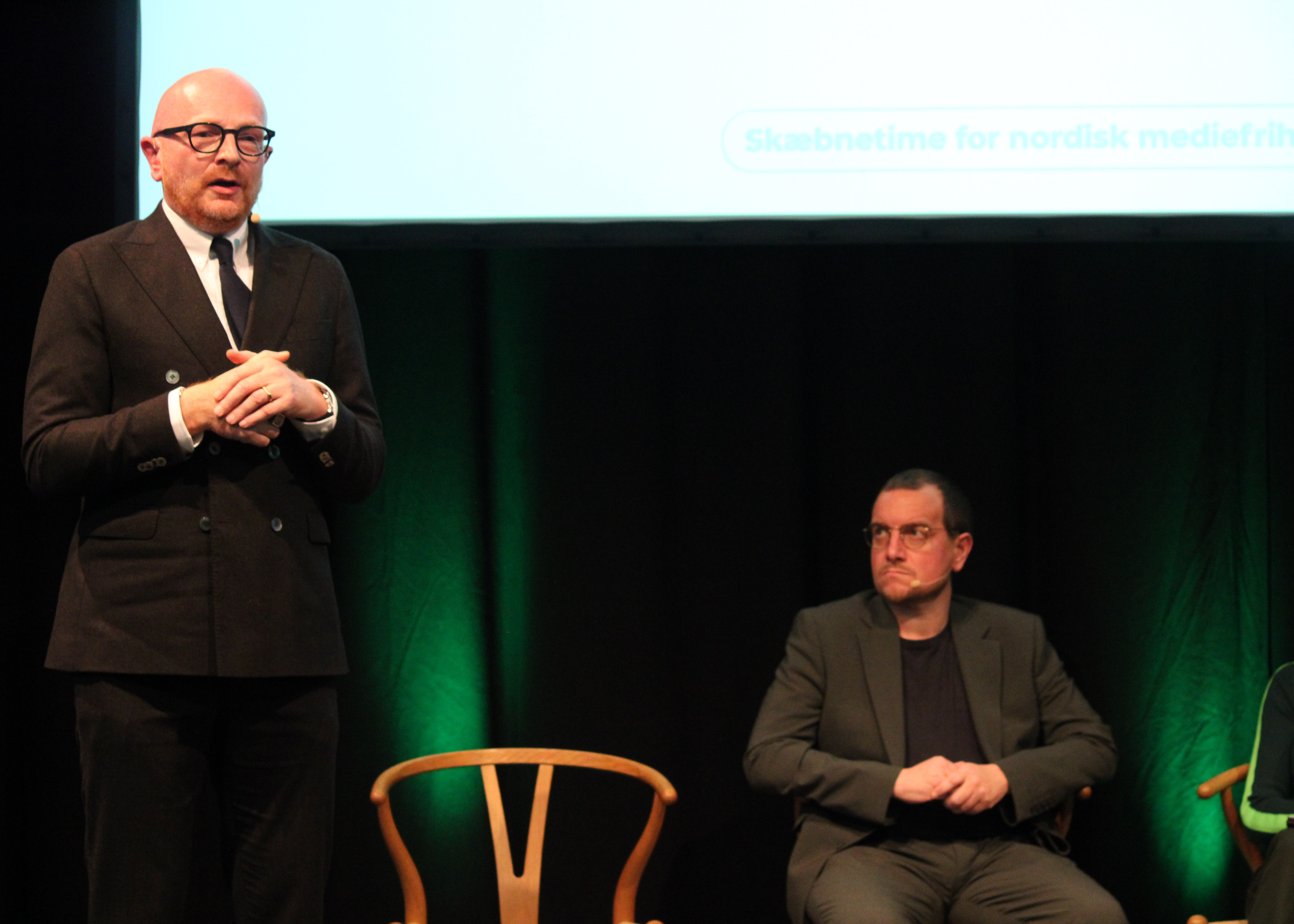
Brügger in conversation with Mikkel Andersson on press freedom in November 2025

In October 2020, Brügger's documentary The Mole: Undercover in North Korea was released, featuring a Danish chef going undercover in the Korean Friendship Association over the course of ten years, while trying to uncover the illicit arms and narcotics dealings of North Korea.

=== Other media ===
Brügger has hosted the talk show Den 11. time as well as the news program Deadline on the Danish channel DR2.

== Filmography ==
- Danes for Bush – documentary series (2004)
- The Red Chapel (2009)
- The Ambassador (2011)
- The Saint Bernard Syndicate (2018)
- Cold Case Hammarskjöld (2019)
- The Mole: Undercover in North Korea (2020)
