= Reagan Wickens =

Australian swimmer (born 1994)

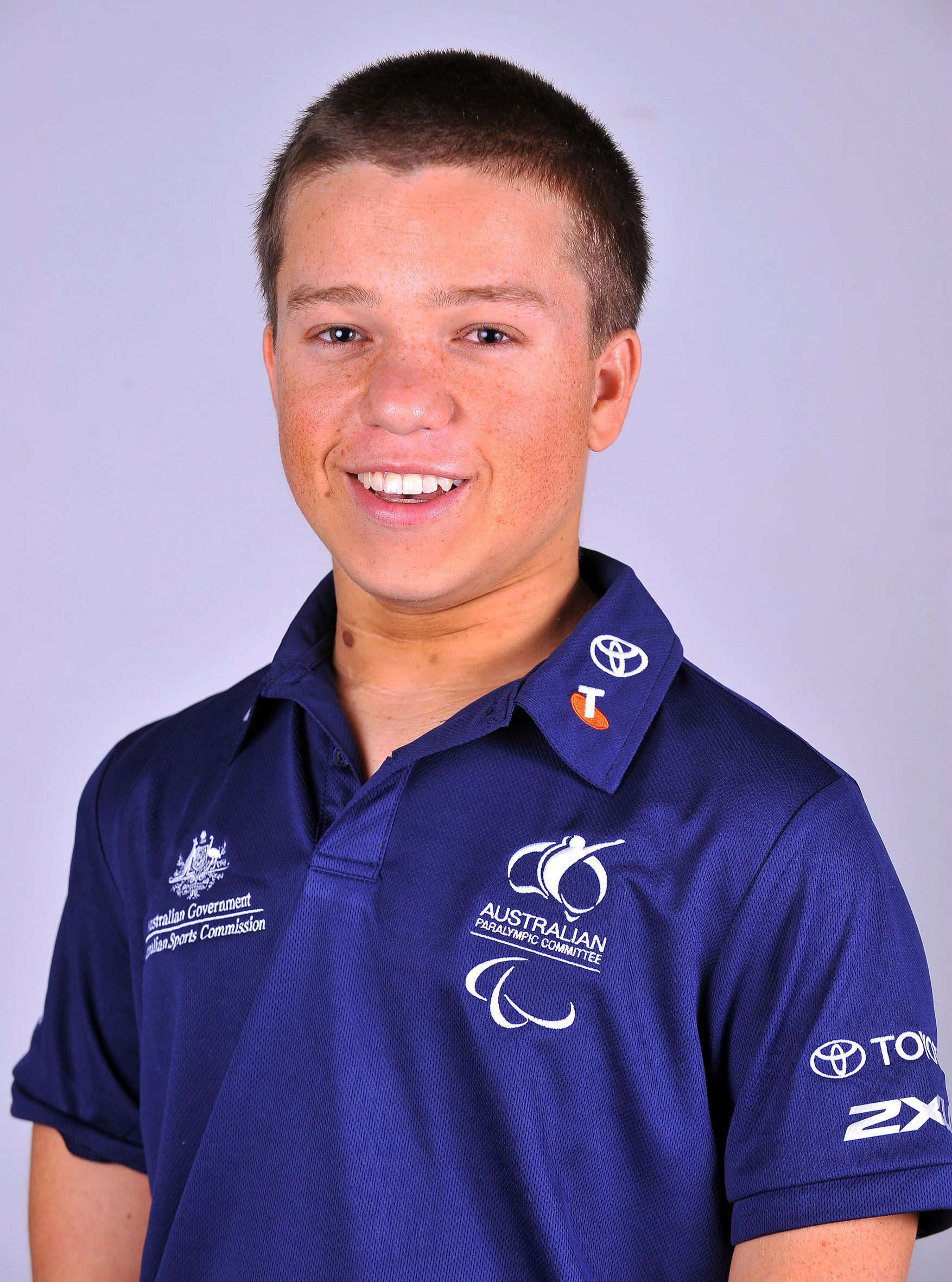
- 2012 Australian Paralympic team portrait of Wickens

Personal information
- Full name: Reagan Wickens
- Nationality: Australia
- Born: 16 December 1994 (age 31)

Sport
- Sport: Swimming
- Strokes: Freestyle, butterfly, medley
- Classifications: S6, SB5, SM6

Reagan Wickens (born 16 December 1994) is an Australian swimmer. He was selected to represent Australia at the 2012 Summer Paralympics in swimming, but did not medal.

== Personal ==
Wickens was born on 16 December 1994 and is from Grays Point, New South Wales. He has three brothers. He has Achondraplasia. As of 2012 he attends St Patrick's College, Sutherland where he was in year 12.

== Swimming ==
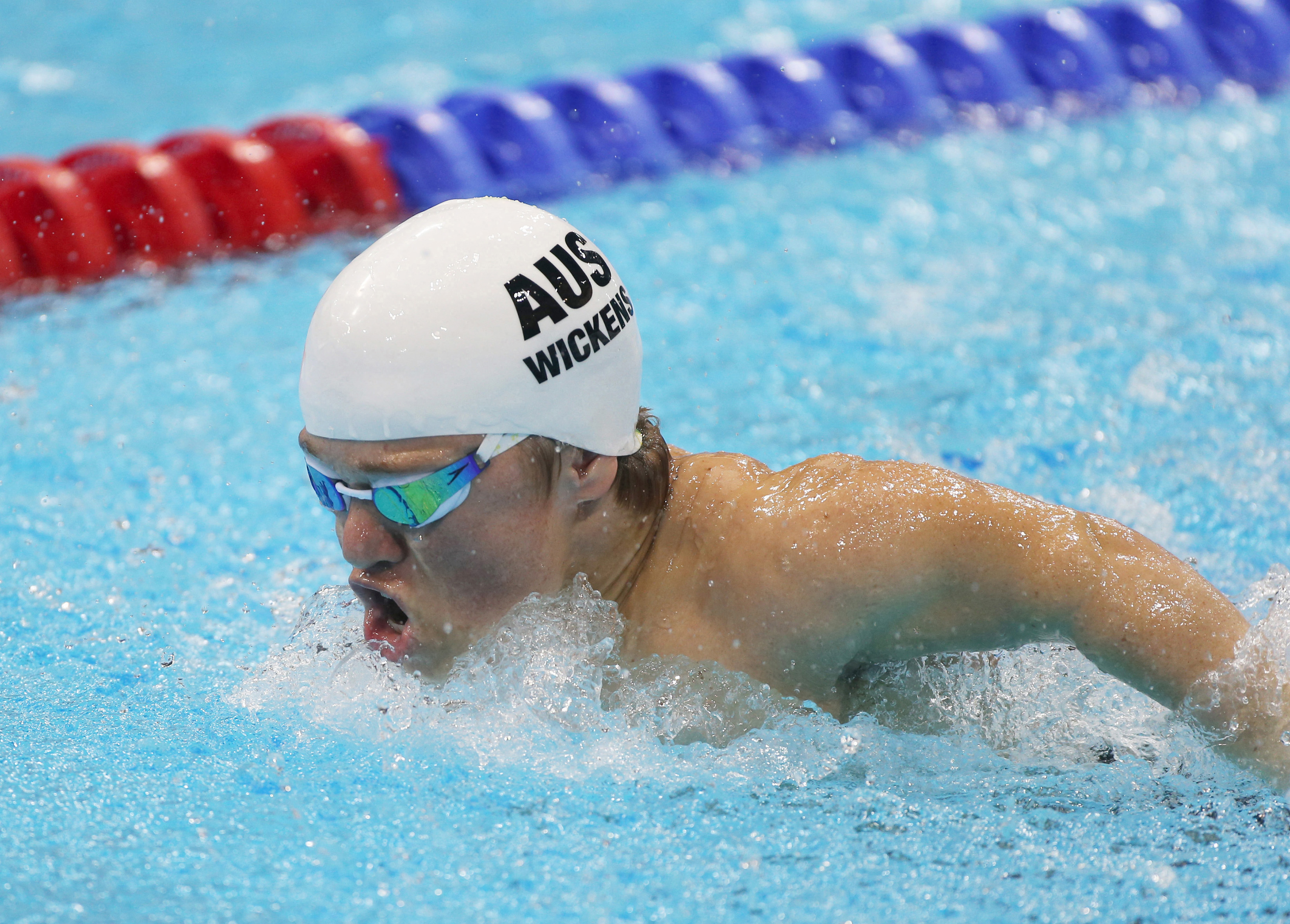
Wickens at the 2012 London Paralympics

Wickens is an S6 classified swimmer. Reagan started swimming at his local pool, Sutherland leisure centre, at a young age and first competed at the age of 10 in school carnivals. He competed at the 2009 Youth Paralympics in four different swimming strokes, and taking home five medals, one of which was gold. He competed at the 2011 New South Wales Multi Class Championships, where he competed in three events and finished first in all of them. That year, he also competed Para-Pan Pacific Championships where he earned four silver medals and two gold medals. He was selected to represent Australia at the 2012 Summer Paralympics in swimming in the 400 m Freestyle, 50 m Butterfly, 50 m Freestyle, 200 m Individual medley, 100 m Backstroke and 100 m Freestyle. He left for Wales for a team training camp on 10 August 2012 before the start of the Games. He did not medal at the 2012 Games.

At the 2015 IPC Swimming World Championships, Glasgow, Scotland, he finished seventh in the Men's 400m Freestyle S6, twelfth in the Men's 50m Butterfly S6, Men's 100m Freestyle S6, and Men's 200m Individual Medley SM6 and Men's 100m Backstroke S6.

=== Personal bests ===
Course	Event	Time	Meet	Swim Date	Reference
Long	50m Backstroke	46.42	2012 Victorian Championships	15-Jan-2012	
Long	100m Backstroke	01:34.9	2012 NSW State Open Championships All Events	11-Feb-2012	
Long	50m Breaststroke	53.69	2012 Victorian Championships	14-Jan-2012	
Long	100m Breaststroke	02:01.2	2011 Swimming NSW MC Championship Meet	22-Oct-2011	
Long	50m Butterfly	39.75	2012 NSW Metropolitan Championships	4-Mar-2012	
Long	100m Butterfly	01:26.0	2012 EnergyAustralia Swimming Championships	21-Mar-2012	
Long	50m Freestyle	35.82	2012 EnergyAustralia Swimming Championships	16-Mar-2012	
Long	100m Freestyle	01:15.5	2012 NSW State Open Championships All Events	12-Feb-2012	
Long	200m Freestyle	02:43.7	2011 Swimming NSW MC Championship Meet	22-Oct-2011	
Long	400m Freestyle	05:23.1	2012 NSW State Open Championships All Events	11-Feb-2012	
Long	200m Medley	03:15.3	2012 Victorian Championships	15-Jan-2012	
Short	50m Backstroke	47.05	2012 NSW Metropolitan SC Championships	15-Jul-2012	
Short	50m Breaststroke	55.94	2011 NSW Metropolitan SC Championships	16-Jul-2011	
Short	50m Butterfly	39.96	2012 NSW Metropolitan SC Championships	15-Jul-2012	
Short	100m Butterfly	01:34.2	2011 Australian Short Course Championships	2-Jul-2011	
Short	50m Freestyle	36.2	2012 NSW Metropolitan SC Championships	14-Jul-2012	
Short	100m Freestyle	01:19.4	2011 Australian Short Course Championships	1-Jul-2011	
Short	400m Freestyle	05:39.4	2011 Australian Short Course Championships	2-Jul-2011	
