= Rim Ju-song =

North Korean swimmer (born 1995)

- Hangul: 림주성
- Hanja: 林柱成
- RR: Rim Juseong
- MR: Rim Chusŏng

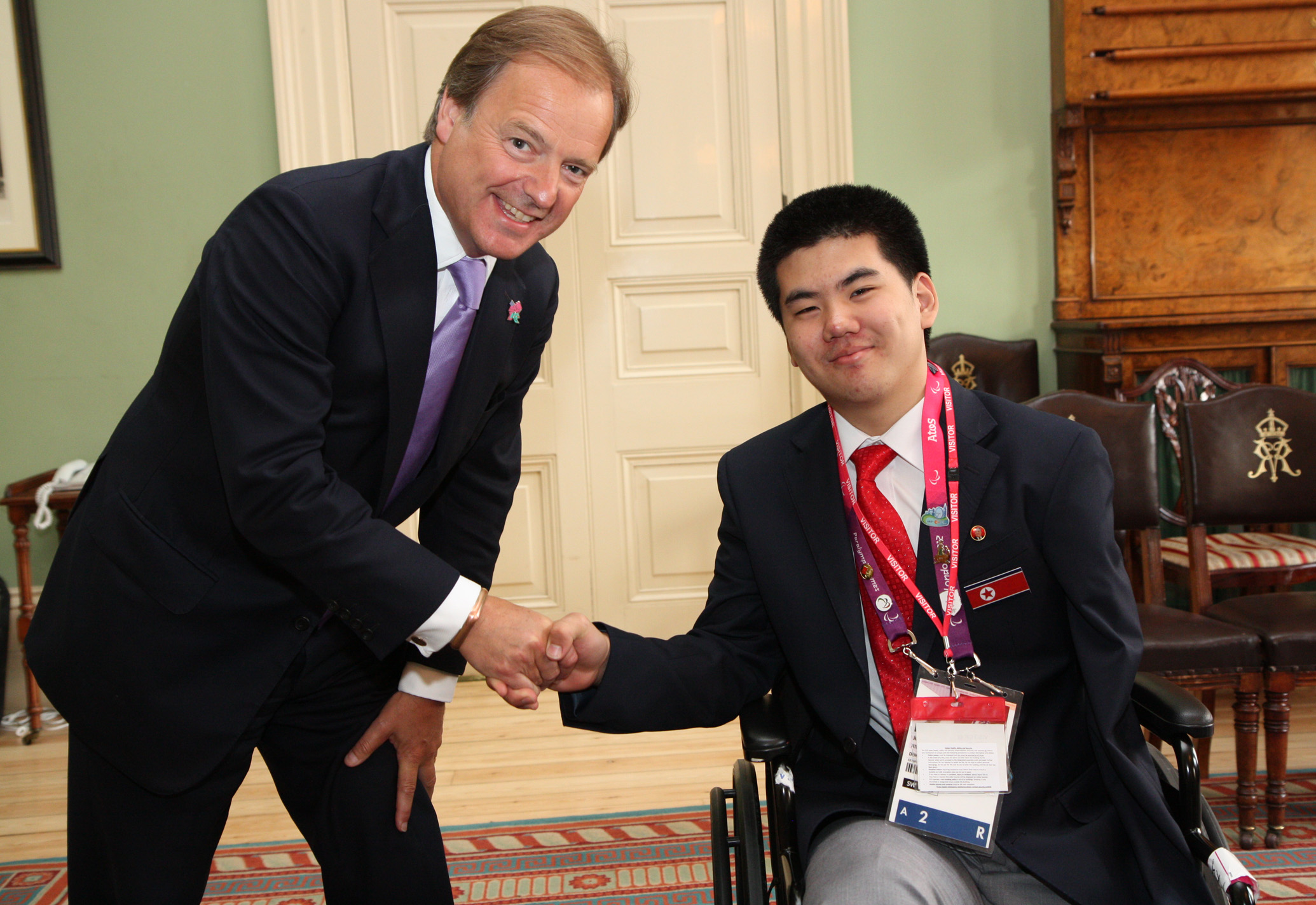
Foreign Office Minister Hugo Swire meeting Rim Ju-song in London, September 2012.

Rim Ju-song (born 31 October 1995) is a North Korean swimmer. He was selected to be North Korea's sole representative for the country's first ever participation in the Paralympic Games, at the 2012 London Summer Paralympics.

At the time when he was selected, he was living in Beijing. By the time North Korea received clearance to compete in London, it was "too late to qualify for most events, but swimming was an exception". Thus North Korea's representative would have to be a swimmer. Rim, who did not know how to swim, began to learn the crawl stroke in April 2012, reportedly with great difficulty at first, and the breaststroke in May.

Rim is a left arm and left leg amputee, and also has limited use of his right leg and right foot, following "an accident on a construction site" at the age of five. He was able to make the Games upon receiving a wildcard invitation from the International Paralympic Committee, and with financial support from the British embassy in Pyongyang. He competed in freestyle swimming in the S6 disability category. His time in qualifying prior to the Games (disregarded as he was invited to the Games notwithstanding) was 1:10.00, i.e. 35.3 seconds slower than the slowest actual qualifier.
