= List of United Nations Security Council Resolutions 2201 to 2300 =

This is a list of United Nations Security Council Resolutions 2201 to 2300 adopted between 15 February 2015 and 26 July 2016.

Resolution	Date	Vote	Concerns
2201	15 February 2015	15–0–0	Situation in Yemen
2202	17 February 2015	15–0–0	A letter from the permanent representative of the Russian Federation on the situation in Ukraine
2203	18 February 2015	15–0–0	Situation in Guinea-Bissau
2204	24 February 2015	15–0–0	Situation in Yemen
2205	26 February 2015	15–0–0	Reports of the Secretary-General on the Sudan
2206	3 March 2015	15–0–0	Situation in South Sudan
2207	4 March 2015	15–0–0	Extends mandate of expert panel monitoring Sanctions against North Korea
2208	5 March 2015	15–0–0	Situation in Libya
2209	6 March 2015	14–0–1 (Abstention: Venezuela)	Chemical weapons in Syria
2210	16 March 2015	15–0–0	Situation in Afghanistan
2211	26 March 2015	15–0–0	Situation in the Democratic Republic of the Congo
2212	26 March 2015	15–0–0	Situation in the Central African Republic
2213	27 March 2015	15–0–0	Situation in Libya
2214	27 March 2015	15–0–0	Situation in Libya
2215	2 April 2015	15–0–0	Situation in Liberia
2216	14 April 2015	14–0–1 (Abstention: Russia)	Situation in Yemen
2217	28 April 2015	15–0–0	Situation in the Central African Republic
2218	28 April 2015	15–0–0	Situation in Western Sahara
2219	28 April 2015	15–0–0	Situation in Côte d'Ivoire
2220	22 May 2015	9–0–6 (Abstentions: Angola, Chad, China, Nigeria, Russia, Venezuela)	Small arms
2221	26 May 2015	15–0–0	Situation in Somalia
2222	27 May 2015	15–0–0	Protection of Journalists
2223	28 May 2015	15–0–0	Situation in South Sudan
2224	9 June 2015	15–0–0	Non proliferation
2225	18 June 2015	15–0–0	Children and armed conflict
2226	25 June 2015	15–0–0	Situation in Ivory Coast
2227	29 June 2015	15–0–0	Situation in Mali
2228	29 June 2015	15–0–0	Reports of the Secretary-General on the Sudan and South Sudan
2229	29 June 2015	15–0–0	Situation in Middle East
2230	14 July 2015	15–0–0	Reports of the Secretary-General on the Sudan and South Sudan
2231	20 July 2015	15–0–0	Iran nuclear program (JCPoA)
2232	28 July 2015	15–0–0	Situation in Somalia
2233	29 July 2015	15–0–0	Situation in Iraq
2234	29 July 2015	15–0–0	Situation in Cyprus
2235	7 August 2015	15–0–0	Situation in Syria
2236	21 August 2015	15–0–0	Situation in Lebanon
2237	2 September 2015	15–0–0	Situation in Liberia
2238	10 September 2015	15–0–0	Situation in Libya
2239	17 September 2015	15–0–0	Situation in Liberia
2240	9 October 2015	14–0–1 (Abstention: Venezuela)	Maintenance of international peace and security
2241	9 October 2015	13–0–2 (Abstentions: Russia, Venezuela)	Reports of the Secretary-General on the Sudan and South Sudan
2242	13 October 2015	15–0–0	Women and peace and security
2243	14 October 2015	15–0–0	Situation in Haiti
2244	23 October 2015	14–0–1 (Abstention: Venezuela)	Situation in Somalia
2245	9 November 2015	15–0–0	Situation in Somalia
2246	10 November 2015	15–0–0	Situation in Somalia
2247	10 November 2015	15–0–0	Situation in Bosnia and Herzegovina
2248	12 November 2015	15–0–0	Situation in Burundi
2249	20 November 2015	15–0–0	Threats to international peace and security caused by terrorist acts
2250	9 December 2015	15–0–0	Maintenance of international peace and security
2251	15 December 2015	15–0–0	Reports of the Secretary-General on the Sudan and South Sudan
2252	15 December 2015	13–0–2 (Abstentions: Russia, Venezuela)	Reports of the Secretary-General on the Sudan and South Sudan
2253	17 December 2015	15–0–0	Threats to international peace and security caused by terrorist acts
2254	18 December 2015	15–0–0	Situation in Syria
2255	21 December 2015	15–0–0	Threats to international peace and security caused by terrorist acts
2256	22 December 2015	14–0–1 (Abstention: Russia)	International Criminal Tribunal for the former Yugoslavia (ICTY) and Rwanda (ICTR)
2257	22 December 2015	15–0–0	Middle East (UNDOF)
2258	22 December 2015	15–0–0	Situation in Syria
2259	23 December 2015	15–0–0	Situation in Libya
2260	20 January 2016	15–0–0	Situation in Côte d'Ivoire
2261	25 January 2016	15–0–0	Identical letters dated 19 January 2016 from the Permanent Representative of Colombia to the United Nations addressed to the Secretary-General and the President of the Security Council
2262	27 January 2016	15–0–0	Situation in the Central African Republic
2263	28 January 2016	15–0–0	Situation in Cyprus
2264	9 February 2016	15–0–0	Situation in the Central African Republic
2265	10 February 2016	15–0–0	Reports of the Secretary-General on the Sudan and South Sudan
2266	24 February 2016	15–0–0	Situation in Yemen
2267	26 February 2016	15–0–0	Situation in Guinea-Bissau
2268	26 February 2016	15–0–0	Situation in Syria
2269	29 February 2016	11–0–4 (Abstentions: Angola, Egypt, Russia, Senegal)	International Criminal Tribunal for the former Yugoslavia (ICTY) International Criminal Tribunal for Rwanda (ICTR)
2270	2 March 2016	15–0–0	Non-proliferation and sanctions on North Korea
2271	2 March 2016	15–0–0	Reports of the Secretary-General on the Sudan and South Sudan
2272	11 March 2016	14–0–1 (Abstention: Egypt)	United Nations peacekeeping operations
2273	15 March 2016	15–0–0	Situation in Libya
2274	15 March 2016	15–0–0	Situation in Afghanistan
2275	24 March 2016	15–0–0	Situation in Somalia
2276	24 March 2016	15–0–0	Non-proliferation and North Korea
2277	30 March 2016	15–0–0	Situation in the DR of the Congo
2278	31 March 2016	15–0–0	Situation in Libya
2279	1 April 2016	15–0–0	Situation in Burundi
2280	7 April 2016	15–0–0	Reports of the Secretary-General on the Sudan and South Sudan
2281	26 April 2016	15–0–0	Situation in the Central African Republic
2282	27 April 2016	15–0–0	Post-conflict peacebuilding
2283	28 April 2016	15–0–0	Situation in Côte d’Ivoire
2284	28 April 2016	15–0–0	Situation in Côte d’Ivoire
2285	29 April 2016	10–2–3 (Against: Uruguay, Venezuela; Abstentions: Angola, New Zealand, Russia)	Situation in Western Sahara
2286	3 May 2016	15–0–0	Protection of civilians in armed conflict
2287	12 May 2016	15–0–0	Reports of the Secretary-General on the Sudan and South Sudan
2288	25 May 2016	15–0–0	Situation in Liberia
2289	27 May 2016	15–0–0	Situation in Somalia
2290	31 May 2016	15–0–0	Reports of the Secretary-General on the Sudan and South Sudan
2291	13 June 2016	15–0–0	The situation in Libya
2292	14 June 2016	15–0–0	The situation in Libya
2293	23 June 2016	15–0–0	The situation concerning the Democratic Republic of the Congo
2294	29 June 2016	15–0–0	The situation in the Middle East (UNDOF)
2295	29 June 2016	15–0–0	The situation in Mali
2296	29 June 2016	15–0–0	Reports of the Secretary-General on the Sudan and South Sudan
2297	7 July 2016	15–0–0	The situation in the Somalia
2298	22 July 2016	15–0–0	The situation in Libya
2299	25 July 2016	15–0–0	The situation concerning Iraq
2300	26 July 2016	15–0–0	The situation in Cyprus

== See also ==
- Lists of United Nations Security Council resolutions
- List of United Nations Security Council Resolutions 2101 to 2200
- List of United Nations Security Council Resolutions 2301 to 2400
