= North Yemen =

1918–1990 term describing northwest Yemen

Coordinates: 15°21′17″N 44°12′24″E

North Yemen Arabic: اليمن الشمالي al-Yaman al-šamāliyy
- 1918–1990
- Top: Flag (1927–1970); Bottom: Flag (1962/1970–1990) Top: Emblem (1927–1970); Bottom: Emblem (1974–1990)
- Anthems: السلام الوطني (Royal Salute) (1918–1970) Peace to the Land (1962–1978) إرادة أمة 'Iiradat 'Uma "A Nation's Will" (1978–1990)
- Map of the Kingdom of Yemen before 1934

- Location of North Yemen on the Arabian Peninsula after shrinking in 1934.
- Status: Member of the Arab League (1945–1990); Member of the United Nations (1947–1990); Member of the United Arab States (1958–1961)
- Capital: Sanaa (1918–1948, 1962–1990); Taiz (1948–1962)
- Largest city: Sanaa
- Official languages: Arabic
- Religion: Islam (official)
- Government: Mutawakkilite Kingdom of Yemen (1918–1970); Yemen Arab Republic (1962–1990) Details: Islamic theocratic absolute monarchy (1918–1970); Unitary one-party Islamic republic under a military junta (1962-1990)
- History
  - Independence from the Ottoman Empire: 30 October 1918
  - 26 September Revolution: 26 September 1962
  - Yemeni monarchy abolished: 1 December 1970
  - Yemeni unification: 22 May 1990

Area
  - Total: 136,000 km^{2} (53,000 sq mi)
- Currency: North Yemeni rial
- Time zone: UTC+3
- Calling code: 967
- Map of the Yemen Arab Republic
Preceded by	Succeeded by
Yemen Vilayet	Yemen
- Today part of: Yemen

North Yemen (Arabic: اليمن الشمالي, romanized: al-Yaman al-šamāliyya) is a term used to describe the Kingdom of Yemen (1918–1962), the Yemen Arab Republic (1962–1990), and the regimes that preceded them and exercised sovereignty over that region of Yemen. Its capital was Sanaa from 1918 to 1948 and again from 1962 to 1990. Located in the southwestern part of the Arabian Peninsula, the area of the region (Upper Yemen) is approximately 136,000 square kilometers, and it used to have a population of about thirteen million people prior to the Yemeni unification. It was bordered to the north by Saudi Arabia, to the south and east by South Yemen, to the west by the Red Sea, and to Bab al-Mandab in the southwest.

North Yemen was admitted to the United Nations on September 30, 1947. In 1962, the country fought a bloody civil war that ended with the abolition of the monarchy and the creation of a republic in 1970. It was one of the predecessor states of the Republic of Yemen, alongside South Yemen, until its eventual unification in 1990.

== History ==
At the end of World War I, the Ottoman Empire was collapsing. In 1918, as part of the Armistice of Mudros, the Ottoman Empire withdrew from Yemen. That same year, Zaydi religious leader Imam Yahya declared northern Yemen to be independent state, the Mutawakkilite Kingdom of Yemen.

On September 27, 1962, revolutionaries inspired by the Arab nationalist ideology of United Arab Republic (Egyptian) President Gamal Abdel Nasser deposed the newly crowned King Muhammad al-Badr, took control of Sanaʽa, and established the Yemen Arab Republic (YAR). This coup d'état marked the beginning of the North Yemen Civil War that pitted YAR troops, assisted by the United Arab Republic (Egypt), against Badr's royalist forces, supported by Saudi Arabia and Jordan. Conflict continued periodically until 1967, when Egyptian troops were withdrawn following the Six-Day War. By 1968, following a failed royalist siege of Sanaʽa, most of the opposing leaders reached a reconciliation. Saudi Arabia recognized the Republic in 1970.

Unlike East and West Germany or North and South Korea, the YAR and its southern neighbor, the People's Democratic Republic of Yemen (PDRY), also known as South Yemen, remained relatively cordial, though relations were often strained. Following the Yemenite War of 1972, the two nations declared that unification would eventually occur. However, these plans were put on hold due to the Yemenite War of 1979, and war was stopped only by an Arab League intervention. The goal of unity was reaffirmed by the northern and southern heads of state during a summit meeting in Kuwait in March 1979.

=== Politics ===
North Yemen was a republic governed nominally under a constitution adopted in 1970, suspended in 1974, and largely restored between 1978 and the late 1980s. Although a succession of bodies carried out some of the functions of a legislature, they exercised little real power until the late 1980s. During that period, policy making remained in the hands of a relatively progressive military elite that worked closely with a variety of civilians that included a large and growing group of technocrats, the major tribal leaders, and other traditional conservative notables. Although political parties were formally banned, several parties did exist and operated with varying degrees of influence during and between elections.

=== Unification ===
In May 1988, the YAR and PDRY governments came to an understanding that considerably reduced tensions. They agreed to renew discussions concerning unification, to establish a joint oil exploration area along their undefined border, to demilitarize the border, and to allow Yemenis unrestricted border passage on the basis of a national identification card.

Official Yemeni unification took place on May 22, 1990, with a planned, 30-month process, scheduled for completion in November 1992. The first stamp bearing the inscription "Yemen Republic" was issued in October 1990. While government ministries proceeded to merge, both currencies remained valid until June 11, 1996. A civil war in 1994 delayed the completion of the final merger.

== Administrative division ==
=== Mikhlafs ===
Mikhlaf is an ancient administrative division term in Yemen. Yemenis used to call a district of their country Mikhlaf, adding the name of the tribal leader, the name of a place, a famous leader, or a well-known town. The name Mikhlaf was mentioned in ancient inscriptions on stones as the name of the district, and Yemen is unique in naming its Mikhlaf. There were eighty-one Mikhlaf in Yemen, and historians differed on determining their exact number. In Yemeni history, Mikhlaf did not have fixed, clearly defined borders that distinguished them from other Mikhlafs. At one time, it might include many districts, or its area might be narrow and limited to a limited number of villages, and a number of Mikhlafs might fall under it. Sometimes Mikhlaf overlapped, and some included parts of other Mikhlafs, such as the Mikhlaf of Dhi Ra'in, which included the Mikhlaf of Al-Awd, the Mikhlaf of Hajar, Upper and Lower Yafa', and the Mikhlaf of Jayshan. The Mikhlaf shrank, and all that remained were a number of villages in the city of Yarim.

== See also ==
- History of Yemen
- Imams of Yemen
- List of Shia dynasties
- Mutawakkilite Kingdom of Yemen
- United Arab States
- Yemen Arab Republic
- Houthi controlled territory of Yemen
- United Nations Security Council Resolution 29
- United Nations Security Council Resolution 188
