= United Nations Security Council Resolution 2342 =

UN Security Council Resolution 2342
- Date: 23 February 2017
- Code: S/RES/2342(2017) (Document)
- Subject: Yemen
- Voting summary: 15 voted for; None voted against; None abstained
- Result: Adopted

Security Council composition
- Permanent members: China; France; Russia; United Kingdom; United States
- Non-permanent members: Bolivia; Egypt; Ethiopia; Italy; Japan; Kazakhstan; Senegal; Sweden; Ukraine; Uruguay

The United Nations Security Council Resolution 2342 was unanimously adopted on 23 February 2017. The resolution renewed sanctions against individuals and entities engaging in acts that threatened the peace and stability of Yemen until 26 February 2018. The resolution prohibited the sale, supply and transfer of weapons to these individuals and entities, as well as to former Yemeni President Ali Abdullah Saleh, Houthi commanders Abdullah Yahya al Hakim and Abd al-Khaliq al-Huthi. The Security Council expressed concern at the situation and ongoing violence in Yemen. The council also extended the mandate of the Panel of Experts on Yemen until 28 March 2018.

== See also ==
- List of United Nations Security Council resolutions concerning Yemen
- List of United Nations Security Council Resolutions 2301 to 2400
