= United Nations Security Council Resolution 2253 =

UN Security Council Resolution 2253
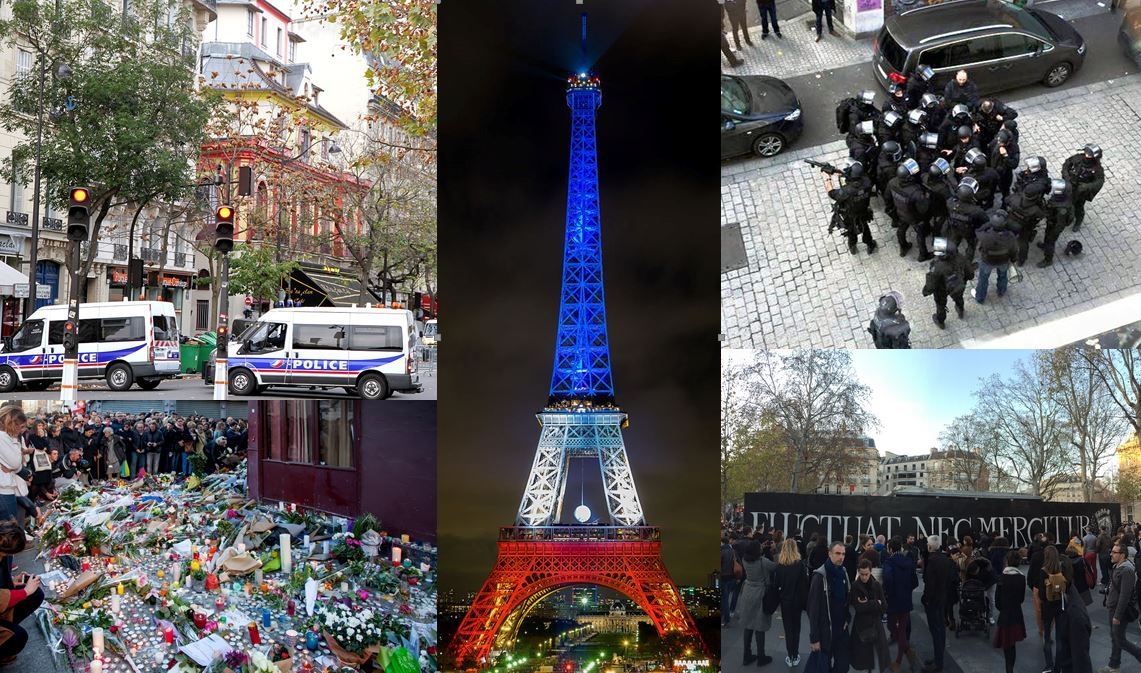
- Date: 17 December 2015
- Meeting no.: 7587
- Code: S/RES/2253 (Document)
- Subject: Security Council Expands Sanctions Framework to Include Islamic State in Iraq and Levant
- Voting summary: 15 voted for; None voted against; None abstained
- Result: Adopted

Security Council composition
- Permanent members: China; France; Russia; United Kingdom; United States
- Non-permanent members: Angola; Chad; Chile; Jordan; Lithuania; Malaysia; New Zealand; Nigeria; Spain; Venezuela

United Nations Security Council Resolution 2253 was prepared by the United States and Russia and was unanimously adopted by the UN Security Council on 17 December 2015. The resolution specified that the sanctions that were already in force against Al Qaeda would also focus on the Islamic State in Iraq and to (ISIL/Da’esh). This resolution summed up the criteria according to which persons and organizations could end up on the sanctions list. Countries were also asked to take stricter action to cut off the financing of terrorist groups.

== Background ==
In the aftermath of the terrorist attacks on September 11, 2001, sanctions were imposed against Al Qaeda, which had committed the attacks, and the Taliban, who at the time controlled Afghanistan and supported Al Qaeda. The sanctions included the freezing of bank balances, a re-entry ban, and an arms embargo. In 2011, the sanctions against both groups were disconnected and Al Qaeda was given its own sanction rules.

== Content ==
Since the Islamic State was a splinter group of Al Qaeda, everyone who supported IS also fell under Al Qaeda's sanctions system. It was decided that the sanction list would henceforth be called IS and Al Qaida sanction list. All UN Member States were urged to cooperate in updating this sanction list. The mandate of the ombudsman handling applications for the deletion of the list was extended by two years, as was the mandate of the observation team that oversaw the sanctions.

IS and Al Qaeda, nevertheless, continued to benefit from arms, human and drug trafficking, trade in cultural heritage, mining in minerals, and ransom from abductions. As already stipulated in resolution 2249, these forms of financing for terrorism had to be cut off. Member States were called upon to take stricter actions to this end and to follow the guidelines of the Financial Action Task Force (FATF). This organization was established in 1989 by G7 members to draw up financial rules to combat money laundering and terrorist financing. It was also important that countries share relevant information with each other.

It was also necessary to prevent NGOs and charities from being misused for terrorism and for weapons being supplied to terrorist groups. There was dissatisfaction with the implementation of resolutions 1267 from 1999, 1989 from 2011 and 2199, and in particular the lack of information provided by Member States on the measures they had taken to put the sanctions imposed into practice. The countries were, specifically, asked to report on stopped deliveries of oil, derived products, and refining equipment from or to IS or al-Nusra, and the actions taken on them.

Furthermore, the large flow of international recruits to IS and Al Qaeda, and the role that the internet played in this, caused great concern.

== Related resolutions ==
- United Nations Security Council Resolution 2195
- United Nations Security Council Resolution 2249
