= United Nations Security Council Resolution 2375 =

UN Security Council Resolution 2375
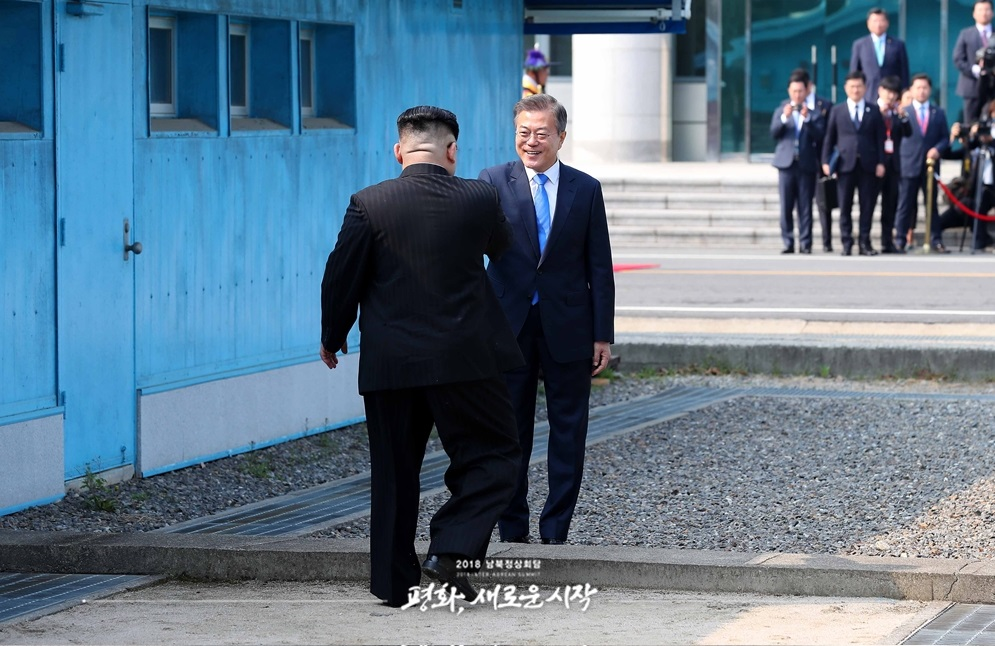
- April 2018 inter-Korean summit
- Date: 11 September 2017
- Code: S/RES/2375 (Document)
- Subject: Non-proliferation: Democratic People's Republic of Korea
- Voting summary: 15 voted for; None voted against; None abstained
- Result: Adopted

Security Council composition
- Permanent members: China; France; Russia; United Kingdom; United States
- Non-permanent members: Bolivia; Egypt; Ethiopia; Italy; Japan; Kazakhstan; Senegal; Sweden; Ukraine; Uruguay

United Nations Security Council Resolution 2375 was adopted on 11 September 2017. The United Nations Security Council unanimously adopted a new sanctions resolution against North Korea, a response to its sixth nuclear test on September 3. The resolution reduces about 30% of oil provided to North Korea by cutting off over 55% of refined petroleum products going to North Korea.

== Negotiations ==
The agreed sanctions fell significantly short of the far-reaching penalties that the Trump administration had demanded, having had to compromise with China and Russia to gain their support. Namely, the resolution only sets a cap on oil exports to N.K; the U.S. had originally wanted a complete cutoff, but China had expressed concern that such a drastic measure would lead to N.K.’s collapse. The Russian Ministry of Foreign Affairs, after the passage of the watered-down resolution, credited itself with having the strictest provisions of the U.S. original draft removed from the resolution.

== Sanctions ==
Sanctions include the following:

- Full ban on selling natural gas condensates and liquids to N.K.
- Full ban on purchasing N.K. textiles (expected to reduce the country's revenues by $800 million).
- A quota for selling oil to N.K. (an estimated 30% reduction on current levels).
  - Refined petroleum: 500,000 barrels during an initial period of three months — beginning on 1 October 2017 and ending on 31 December 2017 — and exceeding 2 million barrels per year during a period of 12 months beginning on 1 January 2018 and annually thereafter.
  - Crude oil: Limits sales to N.K. to not exceed the amount supplied by each State in the 12-month period prior to the adoption the resolution.
- Limits visas to be provided by N.K. laborers overseas. Existing visas are allowed to continue until expired, but no new visas are allowed to be issued. The U.S. estimates this will "eventually deny the regime another half billion dollars each year it takes from the nearly 100,000 North Korean citizens working around the world".
- It asks all countries to inspect ships going in and out of North Korea's ports (a provision put in place by the Security Council in 2009) but does not authorize the use of force for ships that do not comply (the U.S. wanted authorization to use force and a full naval blockade).
  - If flag states refuse to allow inspections of suspicious vessels, then the flag state is required to redirect the vessels to a port for inspection.
  - If a flag state or vessel does not cooperate with inspections, then the vessel can be designated for an asset freeze, denied port access, de-registered, and suffer other penalties.
- A ban to joint ventures. This is aimed at further reducing foreign income, as well as technology transfers. However, there are some exemptions for some border projects that involve China and Russia.

== Aftermath ==
After the sanctions were announced, the North Korean government stated the sanctions justified its nuclear program, and vowed to proceed with a "faster pace".

United States reconnaissance satellite imagery taken on 19 October 2017 show Chinese ships selling oil to North Korean vessels, in apparent violation of Security Resolution 2375.

On 28 December 2017, U.S. President Donald Trump accused the Chinese government of "allowing oil to go into North Korea." Chinese Foreign Ministry spokeswoman Hua Chunying responded to these accusations, saying, "China has always implemented U.N. Security Council resolutions pertaining to North Korea in their entirety and fulfils its international obligations. We never allow Chinese companies and citizens to violate the resolutions. If, through investigation, it's confirmed there are violations of the U.N. Security Council resolutions, China will deal with them seriously in accordance with laws and regulations."

== See also ==
- 2017 North Korea crisis
- 2017 North Korean nuclear test
- 2017 in North Korea
- UN Security Council Sanctions Committee on North Korea
- List of United Nations Security Council Resolutions 2301 to 2400
