= List of United Nations Security Council Resolutions 2301 to 2400 =

This is a list of United Nations Security Council Resolutions 2301 to 2400 adopted between 26 July 2016 and 8 February 2018.

Resolution	Date	Vote	Concerns
2301	26 July 2016	15–0–0	Situation in the Central African Republic
2302	29 July 2016	15–0–0	Reports of the Secretary-General on the Sudan and South Sudan
2303	29 July 2016	11–0–4 (Abstentions: Angola, China, Egypt, Venezuela)	The situation in Burundi
2304	12 August 2016	11–0–4 (Abstentions: China, Egypt, Russian Federation, Venezuela)	Reports of the Secretary-General on the Sudan and South Sudan
2305	30 August 2016	15–0–0	The situation in the Middle East (UNIFIL)
2306	6 September 2016	15–0–0	International Tribunal - Yugoslavia
2307	13 September 2016	15–0–0	Identical letters dated 19 January 2016 from the Permanent Representative of Colombia to the United Nations addressed to the Secretary-General and the President of the Security Council
2308	14 September 2016	15–0–0	The situation in Liberia
2309	22 September 2016	15–0–0	Threats to international peace and security caused by terrorist acts: Aviation security
2310	23 September 2016	14–0–1 (Abstention: Egypt)	Maintenance of international peace and security
2311	6 October 2016	Adopted by acclamation	Recommendation for the appointment of António Guterres as Secretary-General of the United Nations
2312	6 October 2016	14–0–1 (Abstention: Venezuela)	Maintenance of international peace and security
2313	13 October 2016	15–0–0	United Nations Stabilisation Mission in Haiti
2314	31 October 2016	15–0–0	The situation in the Middle East (Syria)
2315	8 November 2016	15–0–0	The situation in Bosnia and Herzegovina
2316	9 November 2016	15–0–0	The situation in Somalia
2317	10 November 2016	10–0–5 (Abstentions: Angola, China, Egypt, Russian Federation, Venezuela)	The situation in Somalia
2318	15 November 2016	15–0–0	Reports of the Secretary-General on the Sudan and South Sudan
2319	17 November 2016	15–0–0	The situation in the Middle East (Syria)
2320	18 November 2016	15–0–0	Cooperation between the United Nations and regional and subregional organizations in maintaining international peace and security
2321	30 November 2016	15–0–0	Non-proliferation/Democratic People’s Republic of Korea
2322	12 December 2016	15–0–0	Threats to international peace and security caused by terrorist acts
2323	13 December 2016	15–0–0	The situation in Libya
2324	14 December 2016	Adopted by acclamation	Tribute to the outgoing Secretary-General Ban Ki-moon
2325	15 December 2016	15–0–0	Non-proliferation of weapons of mass destruction
2326	15 December 2016	15–0–0	Reports of the Secretary-General on the Sudan and South Sudan
2327	16 December 2016	15–0–0	Reports of the Secretary-General on the Sudan and South Sudan
2328	19 December 2016	15–0–0	The situation in the Middle East (Syria)
2329	19 December 2016	15–0–0	International Tribunal for the Prosecution of Persons Responsible for Serious Violations of International Humanitarian Law Committed in the Territory of the Former Yugoslavia since 1991
2330	19 December 2016	15–0–0	The situation in the Middle East (UNDOF)
2331	20 December 2016	15–0–0	Maintenance of international peace and security
2332	21 December 2016	15–0–0	The situation in the Middle East (Syria)
2333	23 December 2016	12–0–3 (Abstentions: France, Russian Federation, United Kingdom)	United Nations Mission in Liberia (UNMIL)
2334	23 December 2016	14–0–1 (Abstention: United States)	The situation in the Middle East (Israel’s Settlements)
2335	30 December 2016	15–0–0	The situation concerning Iraq
2336	31 December 2016	15–0–0	The situation in the Middle East (Syria)
2337	19 January 2017	15–0–0	Resolving the constitutional crisis that followed the Gambian presidential election of 2016
2338	26 January 2017	15–0–0	The situation in Cyprus
2339	27 January 2017	15–0–0	The situation in the Central African Republic
2340	8 February 2017	15–0–0	Mandate extension for expert panel monitoring sanctions in Darfur, Sudan
2341	13 February 2017	15–0–0	Calls on Member States to address threats against critical infrastructure
2342	23 February 2017	15–0–0	Renewal of Sanctions on Yemen
2343	23 February 2017	15–0–0	The situation in Guinea-Bissau
2344	17 March 2017	15–0–0	The situation in Afghanistan
2345	23 March 2017	15–0–0	Non-proliferation/Democratic People’s Republic of Korea
2346	23 March 2017	15–0–0	The situation in Somalia
2347	24 March 2017	15–0–0	Maintenance of international peace and security
2348	31 March 2017	15–0–0	The situation concerning the Democratic Republic of the Congo
2349	31 March 2017	15–0–0	Peace and security in Africa
2350	13 April 2017	15–0–0	The question concerning Haiti
2351	28 April 2017	15–0–0	The situation concerning Western Sahara
2352	15 May 2017	15–0–0	Reports of the Secretary-General on the Sudan and South Sudan
2353	24 May 2017	15–0–0	Reports of the Secretary-General on the Sudan and South Sudan
2354	24 May 2017	15–0–0	Threats to international peace and security caused by terrorist acts
2355	26 May 2017	15–0–0	The situation in Somalia
2356	2 June 2017	15–0–0	Sanctions against Democratic People’s Republic of Korea
2357	12 June 2017	15–0–0	The situation in Libya
2358	14 June 2017	15–0–0	The situation in Somalia
2359	21 June 2017	15–0–0	Peace and security in Africa
2360	21 June 2017	15–0–0	The situation concerning the Democratic Republic of the Congo
2361	29 June 2017	15–0–0	The situation in the Middle East (UNDOF)
2362	29 June 2017	15–0–0	The situation in Libya
2363	29 June 2017	15–0–0	Reports of the Secretary-General on the Sudan and South Sudan (UNAMID)
2364	29 June 2017	15–0–0	The situation in Mali (MINUSMA)
2365	30 June 2017	15–0–0	Maintenance of international peace and security: Mine action
2366	10 July 2017	15–0–0	Identical letters dated 19 January 2016 from the Permanent Representative of Colombia to the United Nations addressed to the Secretary-General and the President of the Security Council (S/2016/53)
2367	14 July 2017	15–0–0	The situation concerning Iraq
2368	20 July 2017	15–0–0	Threats to international peace and security caused by terrorist acts
2369	27 July 2017	15–0–0	The situation in Cyprus (UNFICYP)
2370	2 August 2017	15–0–0	Threats to international peace and security caused by terrorist acts - Preventing terrorists from acquiring weapons
2371	5 August 2017	15–0–0	Sanctions against Democratic People’s Republic of Korea
2372	30 August 2017	15–0–0	The situation in Somalia
2373	30 August 2017	15–0–0	The situation in the Middle East
2374	5 September 2017	15–0–0	The situation in Mali
2375	11 September 2017	15–0–0	Non-proliferation/Democratic People’s Republic of Korea
2376	14 September 2017	15–0–0	The Situation in Libya
2377	14 September 2017	15–0–0	Identical letters dated 19 January 2016 from the Permanent Representative of Colombia to the United Nations addressed to the Secretary-General and the President of the Security Council. (S/2016/53)
2378	20 September 2017	15–0–0	United Nations peacekeeping operations
2379	21 September 2017	15–0–0	Threats to international peace and security (implementation of an Investigative Team in Iraq)
2380	5 October 2017	15–0–0	Maintenance of international peace and security (Libya)
2381	5 October 2017	15–0–0	Renewal and extension of the UN Mission in Colombia
2382	6 November 2017	15–0–0	United Nations peacekeeping operations
2383	7 November 2017	15–0–0	The situation in Somalia
2384	7 November 2017	15–0–0	The situation in Bosnia and Herzegovina
2385	14 November 2017	11–0–4 (Abstentions: Bolivia, China, Egypt, Russian Federation)	The situation in Somalia
2386	15 November 2017	15–0–0	Reports of the Secretary-General on the Sudan and South Sudan
2387	15 November 2017	15–0–0	The situation in the Central African Republic
2388	21 November 2017	15–0–0	Maintenance of international peace and security
2389	8 December 2017	15–0–0	The situation in the African Great Lakes Region.
2390	8 December 2017	15–0–0	The situation concerning Iraq
2391	8 December 2017	15–0–0	Peace and security in Africa.
2392	14 December 2017	15–0–0	Reports of the Secretary-General on the Sudan and South Sudan
2393	19 December 2017	12–0–3 (Abstentions: Bolivia, China, Russian Federation)	Situation in the Middle East (Syria)
2394	21 December 2017	15–0–0	Situation in the Middle East (UNDOF)
2395	21 December 2017	15–0–0	Threats to international peace and security caused by terrorist acts
2396	21 December 2017	15–0–0	Threats to international peace and security caused by terrorist acts
2397	22 December 2017	15–0–0	Non-proliferation/Democratic People's Republic of Korea
2398	30 January 2018	15–0–0	The situation in Cyprus
2399	30 January 2018	15–0–0	The situation in the Central African Republic
2400	8 February 2018	15–0–0	Reports of the Secretary-General on the Sudan and South Sudan

== See also ==
- Lists of United Nations Security Council resolutions
- List of United Nations Security Council Resolutions 2201 to 2300
- List of United Nations Security Council Resolutions 2401 to 2500
