= List of United Nations Security Council resolutions concerning Yemen =

The United Nations resolutions concerning Yemen have mainly dealt with the North Yemen Civil War, 1994 civil war in Yemen and Yemeni Civil War (2014–present).

== List of Security Council Resolutions ==
Resolution	Date	Vote	Concerns
29	12 August 1947	Unanimous	Admission of Yemen, Pakistan
50	29 May 1948	Unanimous	Ordering a cessation of the conflict in Palestine
179	11 June 1963	10–0–1 (abstentions: Soviet Union)	North Yemen Civil War
188	9 April 1964	9–0–2 (abstentions: United Kingdom and the United States)	British attacks in Yemen and airspace violation of Federation of South Arabia
243	12 December 1967	Unanimous	Admission of Democratic Yemen
924	1 June 1994	Unanimous	1994 civil war in Yemen
931	29 June 1994	Unanimous	1994 civil war in Yemen
2014	21 October 2011	Unanimous	The situation in Yemen
2051	12 June 2012	Unanimous	The situation in Yemen
2140	26 February 2014	Unanimous	The situation in Yemen
2201	15 February 2015	Unanimous	Situation in Yemen
2204	24 February 2015	Unanimous	The situation in Yemen
2216	14 April 2015	14–0–1 (abstentions: Russian Federation)	Situation in Yemen
2342	23 February 2017	Unanimous	Renewal of Sanctions on Yemen
2402	26 February 2018	Unanimous	Renewing sanctions against Yemen
2511	25 February 2020	13–0–2 (abstentions: China and Russian Federation)	The situation in the Middle East
2564	25 February 2021	14–0–1 (abstentions: Russian Federation)	The situation in Yemen
2624	28 February 2022	11–0–4 (abstentions: Brazil, Ireland, Mexico, Norway)	The situation in Yemen, Renewal of Sanctions
2722	10 January 2024	11-0-4 (abstentions: Algeria, China, Russian Federation, Mozambique)	Attacks by Houthis on merchant and commercial vessels

== See also ==
- Yemeni peace process
- List of Middle East peace proposals
