= United Nations Security Council Resolution 179 =

UN Security Council Resolution 179
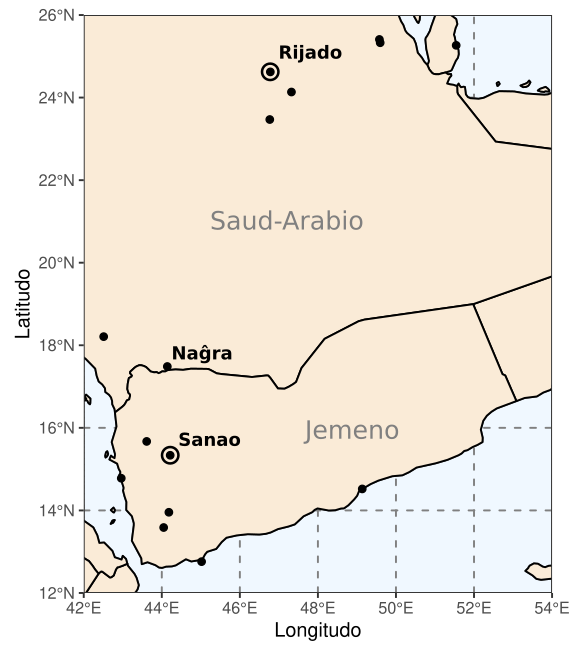
- Map of Yemen
- Date: June 11 1963
- Meeting no.: 1039
- Code: S/5331 (Document)
- Subject: Reports of the Secretary-General concerning developments relating to Yemen
- Voting summary: 10 voted for; None voted against; 1 abstained
- Result: Adopted

Security Council composition
- Permanent members: China; France; Soviet Union; United Kingdom; United States
- Non-permanent members: Brazil; Ghana; Morocco; Norway; Philippines; Venezuela

United Nations Security Council Resolution 179 was adopted on June 11, 1963. The parties directly concerned with the situation in Yemen agreed to disengage and the Governments of Saudi Arabia and the United Arab Republic agreed to pay the expenses for a UN observers mission over 2 months. The Council urged the parties to observe the terms of disengagement and requested the Secretary-General establish the observation operation as he defined and to report to the Council on the implementation of the resolution.

The resolution was adopted with ten votes; the Soviet Union abstained.

== See also ==
- List of United Nations Security Council resolutions concerning Yemen
- List of United Nations Security Council Resolutions 101 to 200 (1953–1965)
- North Yemen Civil War

== Bibliography ==
- Text of the Resolution at undocs.org
