= United Nations Security Council Resolution 2311 =

UN Security Council Resolution 2311
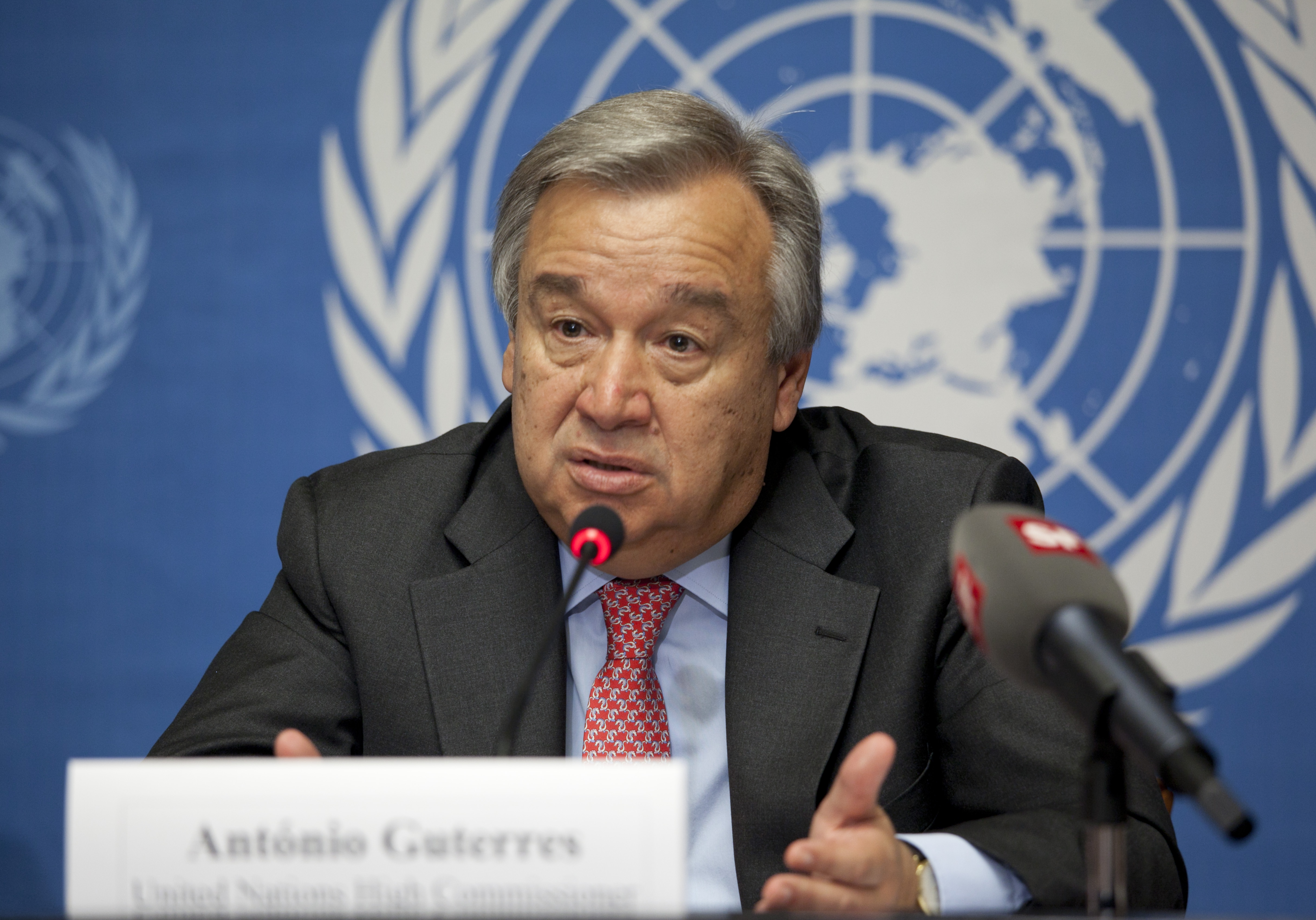
- António Guterres
- Date: 6 October 2016
- Meeting no.: 7,782
- Code: S/RES/2311 (Document)
- Subject: Recommendation regarding the appointment of the Secretary-General
- Voting summary: 15 voted for; None voted against; None abstained
- Result: Adopted

Security Council composition
- Permanent members: China; France; Russia; United Kingdom; United States
- Non-permanent members: Angola; Egypt; Japan; Malaysia; New Zealand; Senegal; Spain; Ukraine; Uruguay; Venezuela

United Nations Security Council resolution 2311 was adopted in 2016, having considered the question of the recommendation for the appointment of the Secretary-General of the United Nations, the Council recommended to the General Assembly that Mr. António Guterres be appointed for a term of office from January 1, 2017, to December 31, 2021.

== See also ==
- List of United Nations Security Council Resolutions 2301 to 2400 (2016–2018)
