= United Nations Security Council Resolution 924 =

UN Security Council Resolution 924
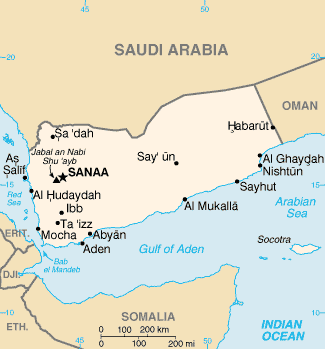
- Yemen
- Date: 1 June 1994
- Meeting no.: 3,386
- Code: S/RES/924 (Document)
- Subject: The situation in Yemen
- Voting summary: 15 voted for; None voted against; None abstained
- Result: Adopted

Security Council composition
- Permanent members: China; France; Russia; United Kingdom; United States
- Non-permanent members: Argentina; Brazil; Czech Republic; Djibouti; New Zealand; Nigeria; Oman; Pakistan; Rwanda; Spain

United Nations Security Council resolution 924, adopted unanimously on 1 June 1994, after considering the civil war in Yemen between the Yemeni government and Yemeni Socialist Party, the Council called for the immediate cessation of hostilities and for a fact-finding mission to be sent to the country.

The Council expressed concern at the death of innocent civilians, while appreciating the efforts of the Arab League, Gulf Cooperation Council, the Organisation of the Islamic Conference and various countries to contribute towards a peaceful solution of the conflict.

After considering that the situation could pose a threat to peace and security in the region, the Council urged for an end to the provision of weapons and other materiel which could contribute towards the conflict, reminding all parties concerned that differences could not be settled through the use of force and urging them to return to negotiations.

The Secretary-General Boutros Boutros-Ghali was requested to send a fact-finding mission to Yemen to assess prospects for dialogue between the parties and to report on the results of the mission within a week of its completion. Despite the passage of Resolution 924, it had little effect, as a ceasefire was declared but lasted only six hours. The conflict was further addressed in Resolution 931.

== See also ==
- List of United Nations Security Council resolutions concerning Yemen
- 1994 civil war in Yemen
- Democratic Republic of Yemen
- List of United Nations Security Council Resolutions 901 to 1000 (1994–1995)
