= United Nations Security Council Resolution 2195 =

UN Security Council Resolution 2195
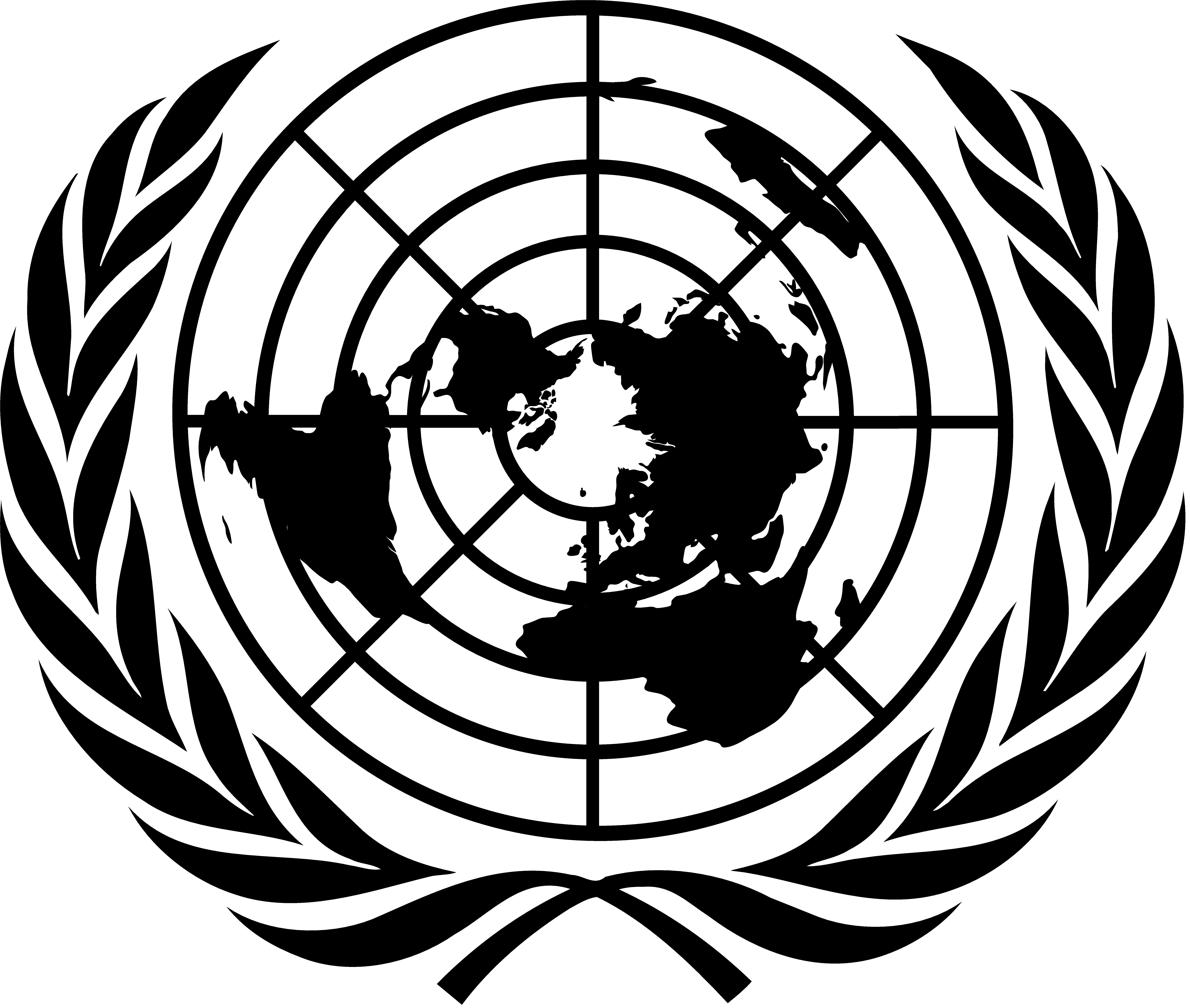
- UN emblem
- Date: 19 December 2014
- Meeting no.: 7351
- Code: S/RES/2195 (Document)
- Subject: Threats to international peace and security
- Voting summary: 15 voted for; None voted against; None abstained
- Result: Adopted

Security Council composition
- Permanent members: China; France; Russia; United Kingdom; United States
- Non-permanent members: Argentina; Australia; Chad; Chile; Jordan; South Korea; Lithuania; Luxembourg; Nigeria; Rwanda

United Nations Security Council Resolution 2195 was adopted unanimously by the UN Security Council on 19 December 2014. The resolution followed a debate initiated by Foreign Minister of Chad who explained the need to adopt international measures to prevent terrorists from benefiting from multi- national organized crime. This would include cases of arms trafficking, human trafficking, drug trafficking, using aircraft for illegal trade, trade in minerals, kidnapping, extortion and bank robberies. Countries of United nation members were asked to fortify guarding their borders in order to restrict the freedom of movement of terrorists.

== Content ==
The debates expressed the need to elevate combating all forms of terrorism to multi- national level . One of the first priorities, in this course, is to cut off ways of financing terrorism which involves organized crime, as well as the need to fight against corruption, money-laundering and illicit financial flows.

Al Qaeda, as a result, has been losing money in this way. Countries were, therefore, called upon to continue to actively participate in working with Al Qaeda Sanctions List.

A region that needed help in the fight against terrorism was Africa, where the combination of terrorism, violent extremism, and transnational organized crime could exacerbate conflicts. A number of partnerships between countries had already been started there to tackle the problems. One was AFRIPOL; A cooperation agreement between the African Police Cooperation Mechanism (Afripol) and the International Criminal Police Organization (Interpol) established in February 2014.

== Related resolutions ==
- United Nations Security Council Resolution 2170
- United Nations Security Council Resolution 2178
- United Nations Security Council Resolution 2249
- United Nations Security Council Resolution 2253 (2015)
