= United Nations Security Council Resolution 931 =

UN Security Council Resolution 931
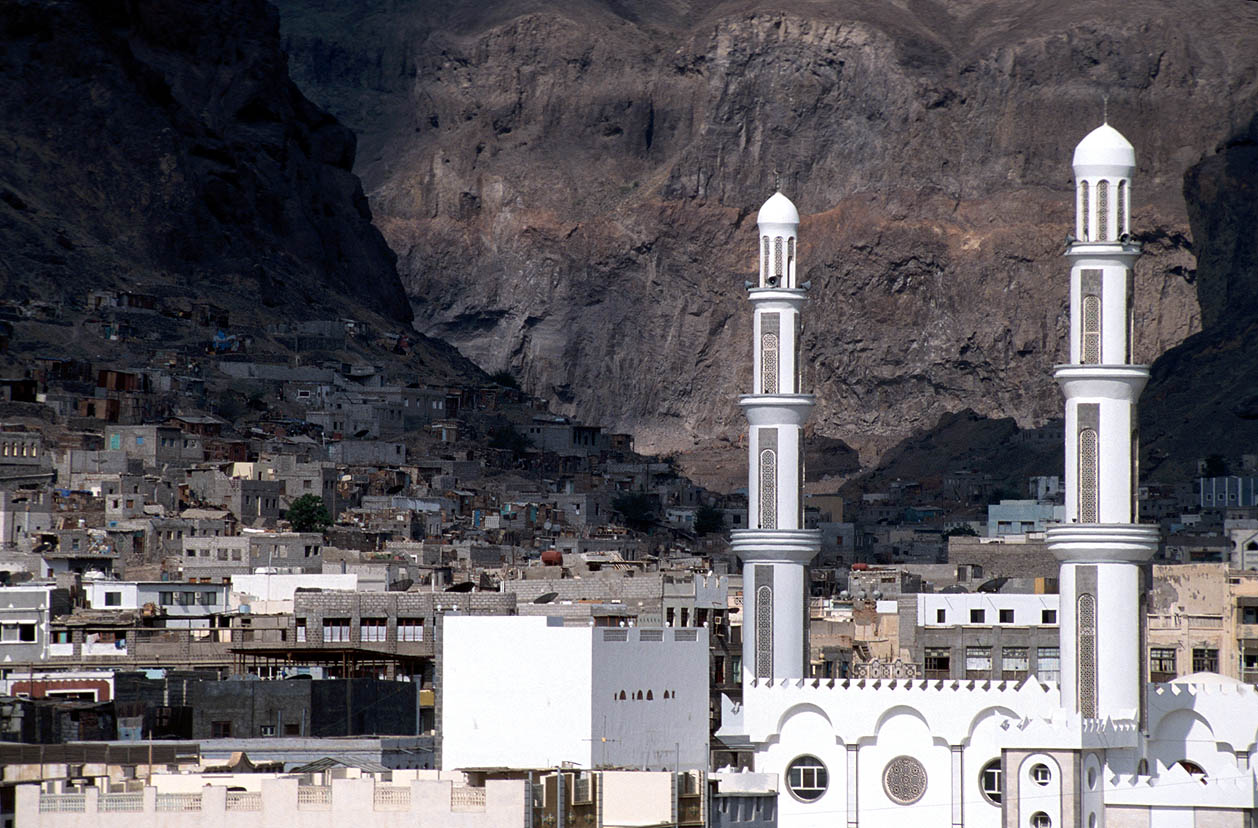
- Aden
- Date: 29 June 1994
- Meeting no.: 3,394
- Code: S/RES/931 (Document)
- Subject: The situation in Yemen
- Voting summary: 15 voted for; None voted against; None abstained
- Result: Adopted

Security Council composition
- Permanent members: China; France; Russia; United Kingdom; United States
- Non-permanent members: Argentina; Brazil; Czech Republic; Djibouti; New Zealand; Nigeria; Oman; Pakistan; Rwanda; Spain

United Nations Security Council resolution 931, adopted unanimously on 29 June 1994, after recalling Resolution 924 (1994) on the civil war in Yemen, the Council considered the findings of the fact-finding mission deployed to the country and demanded a ceasefire.

The Council supported the call of the Secretary-General Boutros Boutros-Ghali for an immediate cessation of the shelling in the city of Aden, condemning the failure of the parties not to heed the call. It was also disturbed at the lack of ceasefire despite several declarations by the Yemeni government and supporters of the Yemeni Socialist Party. Concern was expressed for the deteriorating situation in Yemen, in particular the humanitarian situation and at the provision of arms and other materiel.

A ceasefire was then demanded, stressing the importance and effective implementation of an effective ceasefire. The resolution deplored the continuing military assault on Aden, calling for heavy weapons to be moved out of range of the city. The Secretary-General and his Special Envoy were requested to continue negotiations with both parties on the possible establishment of a mechanism that would monitor, encourage respect for, and help to prevent violations of the ceasefire.

The council also reiterated its calls for an immediate cessation to the provision of weapons and other materiel, noting that political differences cannot be resolved through the use of force. Concern was expressed at the humanitarian situation in Yemen, so the Secretary-General was requested to use all resources to address those affected by the conflict and facilitate the distribution of humanitarian aid.

Finally, the secretary-general was required to report back to the Security Council within 15 days of the adoption of the present resolution detailing progress made.

== See also ==
- List of United Nations Security Council resolutions concerning Yemen
- 1994 civil war in Yemen
- Democratic Republic of Yemen
- List of United Nations Security Council Resolutions 901 to 1000 (1994–1995)
