= United Nations Security Council Resolution 2050 =

2012 monitoring of North Korea's weapons

UN Security Council Resolution 2050
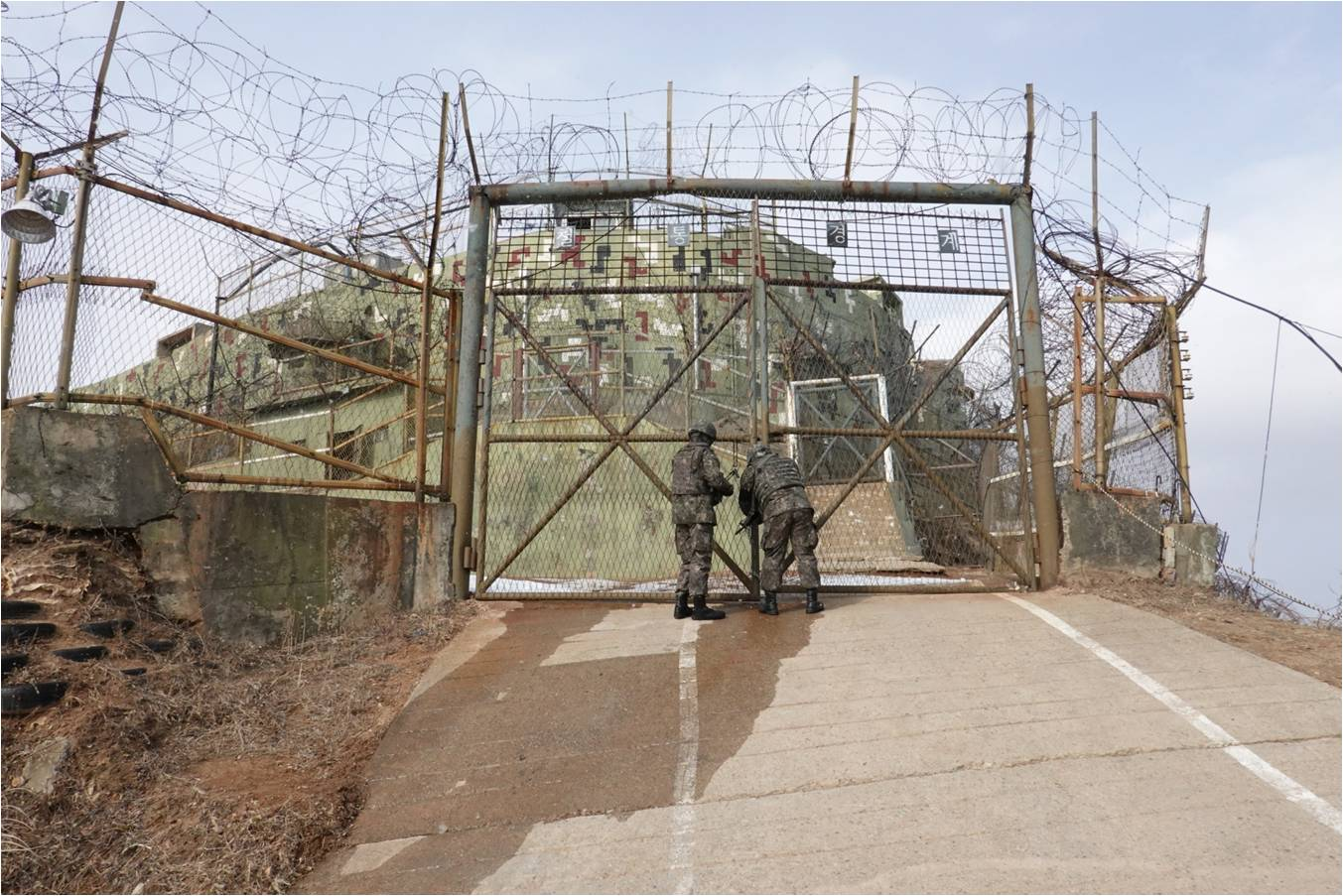
- Guard post in the South Korean side of the DMZ
- Date: 12 June 2012
- Meeting no.: 6,783
- Code: S/RES/2050 (Document)
- Subject: Non-proliferation; Democratic People's Republic of Korea
- Voting summary: 15 voted for; None voted against; None abstained
- Result: Adopted

Security Council composition
- Permanent members: China; France; Russia; United Kingdom; United States
- Non-permanent members: Azerbaijan; Colombia; Germany; Guatemala; India; Morocco; Pakistan; Portugal; South Africa; Togo

United Nations Security Council Resolution 2050 was unanimously adopted on 12 June 2012. It extends the UN's mandate to monitor nuclear, chemical and biological weapons possessed by North Korea, extending the mandate of the Panel of Experts.

== See also ==
- List of United Nations Security Council Resolutions 2001 to 2100
