= United Nations Security Council Resolution 243 =

United Nations Security Council resolution

UN Security Council Resolution 243
- Map location of South Yemen.
- Date: 12 December 1967
- Meeting no.: 1384
- Code: S/RES/243 (Document)
- Subject: Admission of new Members to the UN: Democratic Yemen
- Voting summary: 15 voted for; None voted against; None abstained
- Result: Adopted

Security Council composition
- Permanent members: China; France; Soviet Union; United Kingdom; United States
- Non-permanent members: Argentina; Brazil; Bulgaria; Canada; Denmark; Ethiopia; India; Japan; Mali; Nigeria

United Nations Security Council Resolution 243, adopted unanimously on 12 December 1967, after examining the application of the People's Republic of Southern Yemen for membership in the United Nations, the Council recommended to the General Assembly that the People's Republic of Southern Yemen be admitted.

== See also ==
- List of United Nations Security Council resolutions concerning Yemen
- List of United Nations Security Council Resolutions 201 to 300 (1965–1971)
