= United Nations Security Council Resolution 2624 =

UN Security Council Resolution 2624
- Date: 28 February 2022
- Code: S/RES/2624(2022) (Document)
- Subject: The situation in Yemen
- Voting summary: 11 voted for; None voted against; 4 abstained
- Result: Adopted

Security Council composition
- Permanent members: China; France; Russia; United Kingdom; United States
- Non-permanent members: Albania; Brazil; Gabon; Ghana; India; Ireland; Kenya; Mexico; Norway; United Arab Emirates

United Nations Security Council Resolution 2624, adopted on 28 February 2022, extended for one year arms embargo on Yemen and sanctions including travel ban and asset freeze against those destabilizing the stability of the country. The security council also extended the mandate of the Panel of Experts on Yemen.

Eleven members of the Council voted in favor, while Brazil, Ireland, Mexico and Norway abstained.

== Voting ==
Approved (11)	Abstained (4)	Opposed (0)
Albania; **China**; **France**; Gabon; Ghana; India; Kenya; **Russia**; United Arab Emirates; **United Kingdom**; **United States**	Brazil; Ireland; Mexico; Norway	

- Permanent members of the Security Council are in bold.

== See also ==
- List of United Nations Security Council resolutions concerning Yemen
- List of United Nations Security Council Resolutions 2601 to 2700 (2021–2023)
