= 2024 Yemen floods =

Prolonged seasonal rainfall across Western Yemen

- Date: 28 July 2024 - ongoing
- Location: Western Yemen
- Cause: Heavy rainfall
- Deaths: 100+

The 2024 Yemen floods were a series of severe weather events caused by heavy rainfall that struck Yemen in July and August 2024, resulting in widespread devastation across multiple provinces. The floods led to at least 61 deaths, the displacement of thousands, and extensive damage to infrastructure and agriculture.

== Meteorology ==
The early-August floods were caused by at least eight days of consecutive heavy rainfall. Yemen's rainy season typically begins in late March, with rain intensifying in July through mid-August.

A severe weather bulletin stated that there was a high risk of flooding from 1–10 August due to rainfall reaching 300 mm in the Southern Uplands and the Central Highlands. The bulletin predicted that 7 August would receive the highest density of rainfall at >120 mm in one day, and stated that dry regions such as the Western Hadramaut would still receive rainfall of up to 60 mm. As a result, the bulletin predicted significant flash floods in Western regions of Yemen that could destroy agricultural crops and land in lower-lying areas near the Red Sea coast, and could also cause significant urban flooding due to limited drainage systems.

On 8 August 2024, Yemen's National Center of Meteorology released an orange alert warning of impending extreme weather for 9 August and onwards. The center advised residents in the "central highlands and along western and southern coasts" to avoid driving through or staying in watercourses and valleys.

== Impact ==
Local residents described the floods as "unprecedented," with one Yemeni soldier from the Hays District of Al Hudaydah stating that the degree of rainfall and flooding had not occurred over such a large area in 20 years. A total of 34,260 homes were damaged, affecting 6,042 families. By 18 August 2024, at least 100 people were reported to have been killed by the ongoing flooding.

=== Al Hudaydah Governorate ===
The western governorate of Al Hudaydah was among the hardest hit areas. Officials reported at least thirty fatalities and the displacement of thousands of residents across most districts. Houthi governor of Al Hudaydah Mohammed Guhim stated that five people were reported to be missing and approximately 500 properties were affected. The floods inundated houses, isolated communities, and destroyed roads, residences, vehicles, and agricultural crops. Some residents in the El Mansouria district were reportedly stranded in their homes due to blocked roadways.

Many displaced residents were already internally displaced persons (IDPs) due to the ongoing Yemeni civil war, with the Al Hudaydah Governorate providing shelter to between 50,000 and 60,000 IDPs prior to the floods. Initial reports claimed that an entire village in the province had been completely swept away by floodwaters. Many streets and houses in Al Hudaydah city were inundated, forcing residents to evacuate to safer locations. The floods also triggered widespread power outages and led to the widespread closure of roads and disruption of public services.

==== Healthcare ====
Prior to the floods, regional healthcare capabilities were already strained due to "inadequate supplies of medication, oxygen, lab reagents, and intravenous fluids, as well as a shortage of specialized staff". Out of 477 health facilities in the governorate, only 381 (80%) were fully functional, with 93 (20%) partially functional.

As a result of the floods, Bajil hospital was flooded, as were health centers in the districts of Al-Marawa'ah, Az Zaydiyah, and Al-Zuhra. The Tuberculosis Centre had all its equipment and medications destroyed while suffering significant damage. Al-Thawrah hospital suffered damage in several departments, although it managed to remain operational.

==== Tihamah coastal plain ====
In the Tihamah coastal plain, several reports of significant damage were noted. These included livestock that had drowned in mud, large numbers of destroyed houses that were often made of brick, large amounts of lost or destroyed supplies of drinkable water and food, and many residents being stranded with others needing to be evacuated to Al Hudaydah city.

=== Taiz Governorate ===
In the Maqbanah District in Taiz city, severe flooding on 2 August resulted in fifteen deaths and the displacement of roughly 10,000 people. The floods buried at least 80 wells, destroyed crops, and caused significant damage to houses and infrastructure.

=== Al Mahwit Governorate ===
On August 28, 2024, at least 33 people were killed due to landslides and heavy rainfall in Al Mahwit.

=== Other affected regions ===
The governorates of Hajjah and Raymah also experienced loss of life and property damage due to the heavy rainfall and resulting flooding. The United Nations Population Fund for Yemen reported that floods "impacted more than 28,000 people living in four districts in Hajjah city". The agency's rapid response teams recorded around 4,112 families in need of emergency relief.

=== Broader impact ===
==== Health risks ====
The floods also posed significant public health risks. The combination of poor sanitation and contaminated water exacerbated by the Yemeni civil war increased the likelihood of waterborne diseases. Furthermore, stagnant water created ideal breeding grounds for mosquitoes, increasing the likelihood of vector-borne disease outbreaks that could include dengue fever and malaria. These health risks were particularly alarming given the vulnerability of the population due to it already weakened by years of conflict and economic hardship.

==== Military impact ====
The floods affected military operations in the region. In Hays District in Al Hudaydah, the pro-government Southern Giants Brigades reported one soldier killed and two missing after being swept away by flash floods. A government soldier in the same district described the destruction of military equipment, including barricades, trenches, and ammunition. The flooding also reportedly unearthed land mines previously planted by Houthi forces.

== Response ==
=== Humanitarian response ===
The United Nations Office for the Coordination of Humanitarian Affairs reported on the widespread impact of the floods, particularly in Al Hudaydah governorate. The UN Population Fund's office in Yemen distributed emergency relief to thousands of affected individuals across multiple provinces. 6,797 people in Al Hudaydah, 3,976 people in Hajjah, and about 665 people in Al-Mahwit and Raymah received humanitarian aid.

The aid included relief items, cash assistance, food, and other essential resources such as clothing. However, the UN noted significant challenges in delivering aid, including difficulty in access to affected populations due to damaged roads and widespread flooding preventing transit. Local authorities faced difficulties in reaching severely affected areas for days after the floods, leaving many residents trapped. As a result, local residents reported a lack of humanitarian assistance reaching them directly. Witnesses reported that there was a disconnect between announced humanitarian assistance and actual aid received by affected communities.

The World Health Organization (WHO) immediately dispatched thirty-five humanitarian health kits, fifteen measles kits, and other essential medical supplies to Hodeida.

In April 2024, China provided medical and relief materials including ventilators, defibrillators, x-ray equipment, and more.

=== Government response ===
Yemen's internationally recognized government pleaded for international donors and organizations to provide assistance to the nation. In addition, the Ministry of Planning and International Cooperation called for quick action to address the consequences of the floods, provide relief to affected individuals, and implement urgent flood-draining measures.

According to Masirah TV, chairman of the Supreme Political Council Mahdi al-Mashat ordered local authorities to immediately respond to areas damaged by flooding.
