= United Nations Security Council Resolution 2368 =

UN Security Council Resolution 2368
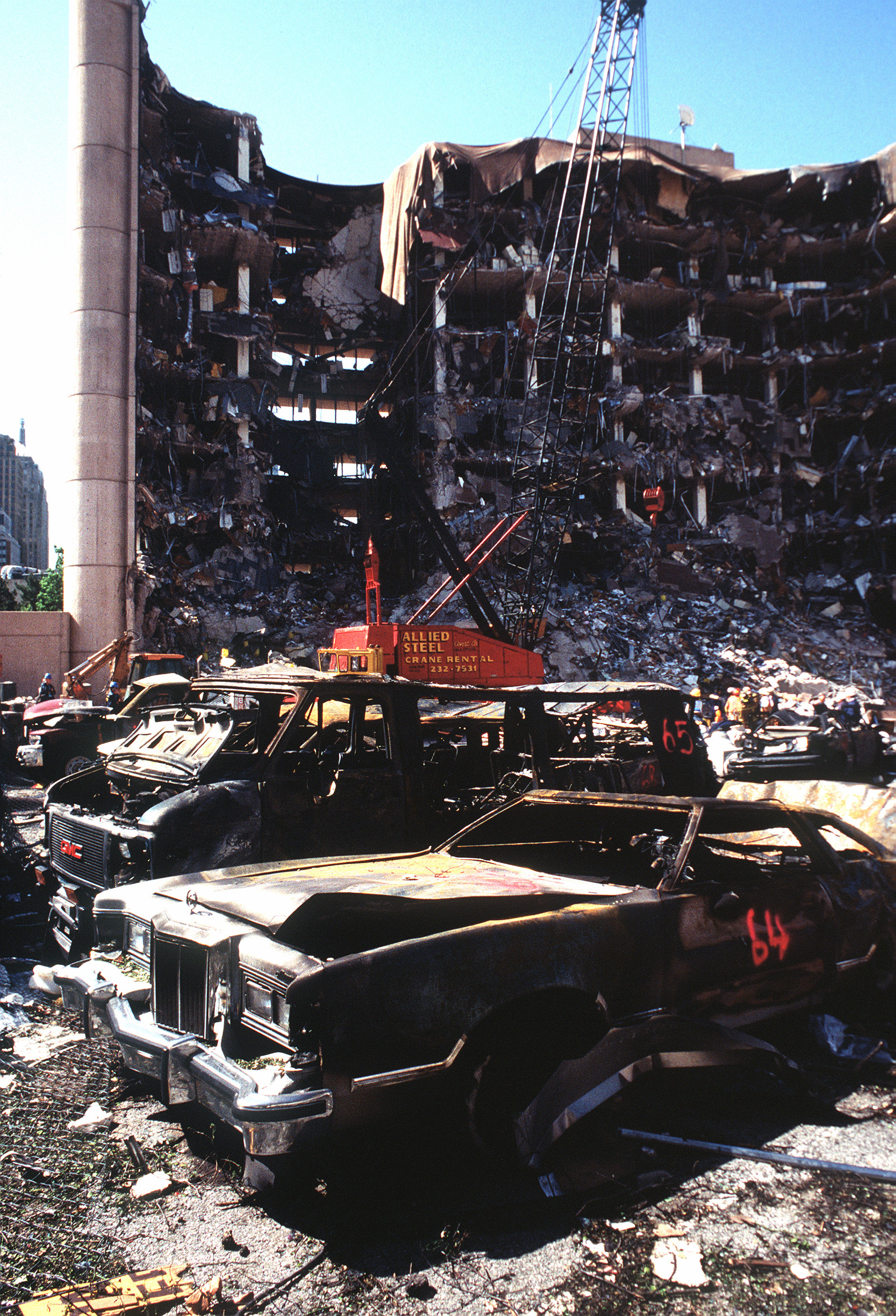
- Date: 20 July 2017
- Meeting no.: 8,007
- Code: S/RES/2368 (Document)
- Subject: Threats to international peace and security caused by terrorist acts
- Voting summary: 15 voted for; None voted against; None abstained
- Result: Adopted

Security Council composition
- Permanent members: China; France; Russia; United Kingdom; United States
- Non-permanent members: Bolivia; Egypt; Ethiopia; Italy; Japan; Kazakhstan; Senegal; Sweden; Ukraine; Uruguay

United Nations Security Council resolution 2368 was a resolution adopted on July 20, 2017.

The resolution focused on the threat to international peace and security exercised by terrorist groups—the Security Council expressed its willingness to adapt to evolving terrorist threats, and encouraged the member countries to update and strengthen their methods employed to eliminate funds disbursed to this groups, to prevent travel by their members, and to ban them from acquiring weapons. The Security Council furthermore called Governments to ensure that sanctions were fully implemented.

The Security Council instructed the committee to keep its guidelines in active review, in order to be possible to grant or deny exemptions on its list of sanctions. It was also agreed to extend of two years the terms of office of the Ombudsman, created with resolution 1904, and of the Analytical Support and Sanctions Monitoring Team, instituted with resolution 1526.

== See also ==
- List of United Nations Security Council Resolutions 2301 to 2400 (2016–2018)
