= United Nations Security Council Resolution 2204 =

UN Security Council Resolution 2204
- Date: 24 February 2015
- Code: S/RES/2204(2015) (Document)
- Subject: Yemen
- Voting summary: 15 voted for; None voted against; None abstained
- Result: Adopted

Security Council composition
- Permanent members: China; France; Russia; United Kingdom; United States
- Non-permanent members: Angola; Chad; Chile; Jordan; Lithuania; Malaysia; New Zealand; Nigeria; Spain; Venezuela

The United Nations Security Council Resolution 2204 was unanimously adopted by the Security Council on 24 February 2015. The resolution extended sanctions on individuals threatening the stability of Yemen and extended the mandate of the Panel of Experts on Yemen for one year.

== See also ==
- List of United Nations Security Council Resolutions 2201 to 2300
- List of United Nations Security Council resolutions concerning Yemen
