= United Nations Security Council Resolution 2216 =

UN Security Council Resolution 2216
- Date: 14 April 2015
- Code: S/RES/2216 (Document)
- Subject: Yemen
- Voting summary: 14 voted for; None voted against; 1 abstained
- Result: Adopted

Security Council composition
- Permanent members: China; France; Russia; United Kingdom; United States
- Non-permanent members: Angola; Chad; Chile; Jordan; Lithuania; Malaysia; New Zealand; Nigeria; Spain; Venezuela

On 14 April 2015, the United Nations Security Council adopted Resolution 2216 on Yemen. Fourteen members of the Council voted in favor, while only Russian Federation abstained. The Resolution imposed "sanctions on individuals undermining the stability of Yemen, calling all Yemeni parties, in particular the Houthis, to end violence and refrain from further unilateral actions that threatened the political transition."

The Council demanded that "the Houthis withdraw from all areas seized during the latest conflict, relinquish arms seized from military and security institutions, cease all actions falling exclusively within the authority of the legitimate Government of Yemen and fully implement previous Council resolutions."

== See also ==
- List of United Nations Security Council Resolutions 2201 to 2300
- List of United Nations Security Council resolutions concerning Yemen
