= United Nations Security Council Resolution 2240 =

UN Security Council Resolution 2240
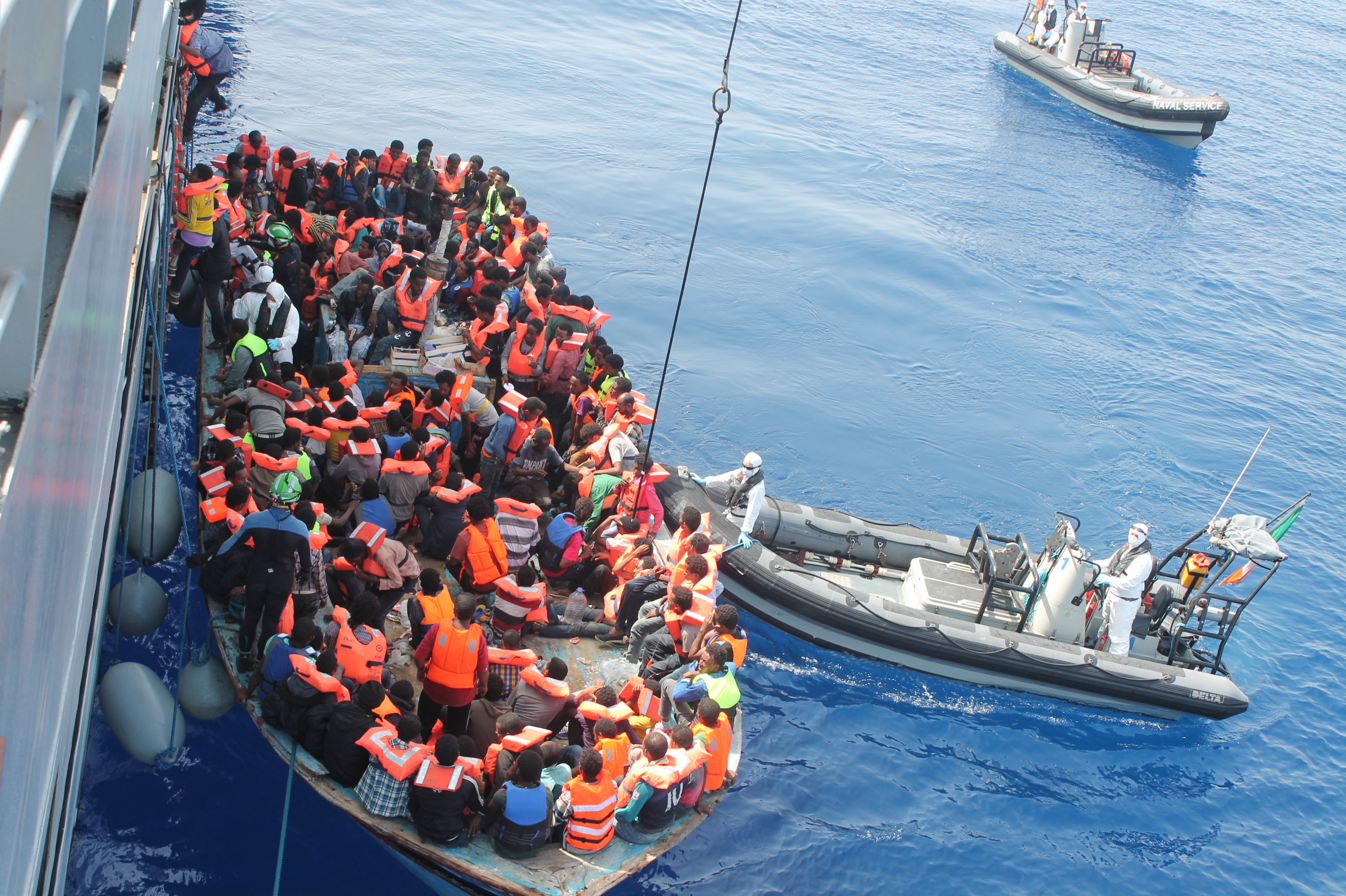
- Date: 14 October 2015
- Meeting no.: 7531
- Code: S/RES/2240 ((2015) Document)
- Subject: Capacity building of state institutions
- Voting summary: 14 voted for; None voted against; 1 abstained
- Result: Adopted

Security Council composition
- Permanent members: China; France; Russia; United Kingdom; United States
- Non-permanent members: Angola; Chad; Chile; Jordan; Lithuania; Malaysia; New Zealand; Nigeria; Spain; Venezuela

United Nations Security Council Resolution 2240 (2015) was adopted by the UN Security Council on 9 October 2015. Fourteen members of the Council voted in favor, while only Venezuela abstained. The resolution aims to address human insecurity at sea and is an example of how the UN Security Council uses its power in the maritime domain to enhance maritime security.

The proposal was brought to the council in response complaints by countries about migrant smuggling and human trafficking on the Libyan coast. It allowed countries on the Libyan coast to intercept and seize ships suspected of human smuggling.

The proposal was brought to the Council by the High Representative of the Union for Foreign Affairs and Security Policy from the European Union ahead of the launch of Operation Sophia. This was an attempt by European countries to address the ongoing illegal migration from Africa to Europe but also maritime insecurity by launching a military mission. This mission hoped to disrupt the business model of traffickers and migrant smugglers by identifying which vessels were used for such activities and then capturing and disposing of those vessels. This mission was not framed as a rescue mission, but it was to prevent more people from losing their lives on the journey over the Mediterranean Sea. The United Nations Security Council Resolution 2240 (2015) was not adopted until after the second phase of Operation Sophia had begun.

Venezuela's reasoning for abstaining was that the resolution's plan would not solve the problem. In particular, the application of Chapter VII of the UN Charter of the humanitarian crisis would be a dangerous precedent, with the Security Council entering the waters through a loophole. The country also claimed that it was also necessary to solve the problems that drove people to look for safer places. Venezuela also objected to what they perceived as the criminalization and the securitization of migrants and asylum seekers.

== Background ==
After the fall of the Colonel Qadhafi's regime in 2011, a new General National Congress was elected to govern Libya. A newly elected Islamist-dominated congress faced strong opposition. When the congress extended its own legislature in early 2014 objected to by the opposition, an army general started a military campaign. In September 2014, after armed opposition groups took control of Tripoli, there were armed clashes near the El Sharara oil field and the Zawiya refinery. Elections followed, and the Council of Representatives came to power. The Islamists were defeated in those elections but remained committed to the congress. Militias allied to both sides, the Islamists and the Islamic State, fought each other in a new civil war. Crimes, namely smuggling of migrants, some of whom left because of the war, and human trafficking, were facilitated by the state of conflict.

The most used route for these illegal migrations took place on the “Central Mediterranean Route”, which typically departed from Libya and ended in Italy, often on small islands like Lampedusa. The route is known for being extremely dangerous and has cost many lives. In 2016, it was estimated that out of 5,143 migrants who lost their lives in the Mediterranean Sea, 4,581 of these people lost their lives on this specific route.

== Content and implementation ==
The Convention against Transnational Organized Crime and its Protocol against the Smuggling of Migrants by Land, Air and Sea and the Protocol for the Prevention, Suppression and Punishment of Trafficking in Human Beings formed the legal basis for the fight against human trafficking. A significant controversy among this effort was the differentiation of migrant and human trafficking. It was also recognized that among those migrants were people who met the refugee definition set out in the 1951 Convention Relating to the Status of Refugees. The coalition stressed that any migrant, regardless of his or her status, should be treated humanely with regard to his or her rights.

The Libyan government was given responsibility to prevent the smuggling and trafficking of human beings across its territory and territorial waters. Other countries were also asked to assist in more effectively guarding the borders of Libya, specifically by monitoring the sea and airspace near the Libyan coast and, as international law allowed, to inspect ships and boats that did not fly a flag if they were suspected of smuggling people. For ships that did fly a flag, permission had to be obtained from the country whose flag was flown because countries had jurisdiction over their ships at sea. The countries were given permission for one year to inspect and, in the event of a violation, seize suspected ships. The state of the flag had to be notified of the incident.

The resolution builds on the idea of shared responsibility for ensuring human security. It builds upon the legal framework set out in the United Nations Convention on the Law of the Sea. Despite there being a shared responsibility, the Libyan Government had the primary responsibility in addressing this issue since the Libyan coast is the primary point of departure. But when it fails to do so, the international community must assist in reducing human suffering and ensure the stability of Libya and the Mediterranean Sea by stopping these vessels and breaking up the business model of the smugglers and traffickers.

The resolution does not authorize member states to detain and prosecute the suspects. This contrasts with Operation Atalanta, which authorized such actions.

The authorization was valid for one year but has been renewed every subsequent year in resolutions 2312 (2016), 2380 (2017), 2437 (2018), 2491 (2019), 2546 (2020), 2598 (2021), 2652 (2022) and 2698 (2023).

Operation Sophia originally wanted to conduct their operations in the territorial seas of Libya, but this was not authorized by the UN Security Council, as their official stance was that it would depend on Libya's consent. In this way, the resolution was fundamentally more limited than what Operation Sophia had originally set out.

Resolution 2240 (2015) invokes Chapter VII of the Charter of the United Nations, which lays out the UN Security Council’s power to maintain peace. Like many crimes committed on the ocean, these crimes are transnational. Transnational crimes are more difficult to address because there are more stakeholders. This is why the resolution and coordination of actions by involved states and the international community in general was necessary.

The resolution has a narrow scope. It only applies to vessels that departed from Libya and are in the high sea off that coast. Human trafficking and migrant smuggling are not problems limited to Libya, and the “Central Mediterranean Route” also departs from countries such as Tunisia and Egypt. However, the resolution is so narrow in scope due to political interests amongst the permanent members of the Security Council and would likely not have been adopted if it was broader.

In practice, human smugglers generally do not accompany the migrants on the vessel.. They instruct the migrants on how to sail the vessel. The goal is for the migrant to reach the high seas and then use the radio to ask for assistance. If the smugglers do accompany the migrants, it is in a separate vessel to ensure they reach the high seas, but not leaving the territorial waters of Libya themselves. The criminals started to change their business model after Operation Sophia and the resolution commenced. They stopped using expensive vessels, as these would be intercepted and destroyed if discovered they were being used for human trafficking and migrant smuggling. Instead, they started using cheap inflatable boats. As such, ensuring human security would need to be done through actions taken on land, something the resolution does not authorize. It is highly unlikely that the UN Security Council would be able to authorize without the consent of Libya, as Russia and China, who are permanent members of the Council, are unlikely to approve such actions. They both stressed that Libya's sovereignty and territorial rights should under no circumstances be breached. This underlines some of the political tensions in the UN Security Council.

== Criticism ==
The resolution has not escaped criticism. Primarily regarding the legality, precision, lack of clarity of mandate, wrong targeting of criminal groups, and addressing root causes.

=== Legality ===
The resolution goes beyond what is permitted by international law of the sea. Here, it does so by authorizing member states to board flagged vessels. Such an action is not normally allowed as it falls under the flag state’s jurisdiction. The extraordinary measures were permitted because the situation was seen as putting international peace at risk and required immediate action. When extraordinary measures are permitted, they can have potential consequence for rights, such as the right to property, life, physical integrity, and liberty.

=== Precision ===
The resolution has been criticized for not being clear on how it should be executed. The resolution is not precise enough for states to be able to follow it, as it is ambiguous and imprecise in its guidance of the member states. This is especially true in the case of good faith efforts of attempting to contact the flag state.

The concept of good faith efforts does not give a distinct measure of time before the vessel can be boarded, and it could mean hours could go by before a warship could inspect a vessel if they must be able to prove they made the effort.

The resolution is also unclear on how member states should enforce the extraordinary powers authorized in the resolution in a way that would prioritize the safety of individuals on the vessel being trafficked or smuggled.

=== Lack of clarity of mandate ===
It has been pointed out, that the UN Security Council was not clear on why it invoked Chapter VII of the UN Charter, as they did not identify how the situation in Libya is a threat to peace, breach of peace, or act of aggression. By not clarifying what the situation threatens, it raises questions about whether the measures authorized were appropriate and fundamentally if the UN Security Council should have been involved or not.

=== Wrong targeting of criminal groups ===
Operation Sophia and Resolution 2240 (2015) have been criticized for not targeting the criminals correctly. To stop and arrest the criminals, it would be necessary to take two different approaches, by tailoring each to either human traffickers or human smugglers as their business models are not identical.

=== Addressing root causes ===
To stop the illegal migration along this route, any measures would need to address the root causes of the migration. The UN Security Council has acknowledged that states in the region need help create conditions in which organized transnational crime can be fought and stability in the region can be reinstated. This could be through approaches such as capacity building and legal frameworks, but the issues have not been solved. As stated at the start of this article, this was also one of the reasons why Venezuela abstained from the vote. They expressed concerns that a military approach would not be able to solve the issue because people were trying to migrate to safer locations, something migrant smugglers were taking advantage of. The only way to stem the flow of migrants and ensure human security would be through addressing the root causes of the migrant flows through Libya. A solely military operation might address the symptoms of the issue, but it would not address the cause.

The resolution and Operation Sophia changed the business model of the criminal groups. The criminals have continued to exploit the situation of individuals desperately searching for better conditions due to political instability.

The resolution and the subsequent re-approvals of the authorization of these extraordinary means have never resulted in options for legal migration, that could have stopped the need for individuals to use the illegal migration routes, but this is beyond the scope of the mission and the mandate of the UN Security Council.
