= UN Security Council Sanctions Committee on North Korea =

Security Council Committee Established Pursuant to Resolution 1718 (2006)
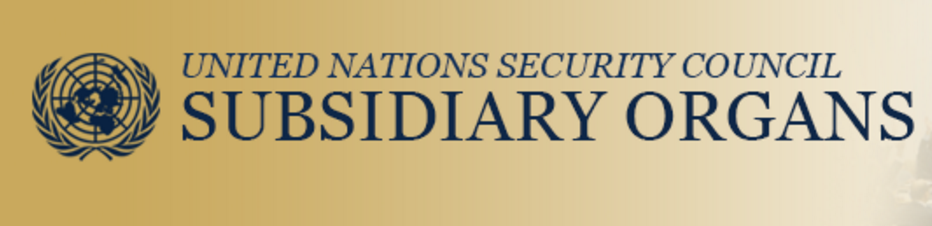
- Formation: 2006, in response to North Korea's first nuclear test, and its continued nuclear proliferation efforts.
- Founder: UN Security Council, in resolution 1718
- Purpose: To oversee the relevant sanctions measures relating to North Korea (DPRK)
- Location: New York, USA
- Region served: Democratic People's Republic of Korea
- Fields: Economic sanctions
- Members: All members of the UNSC
- Parent organization: United Nations Security Council
- Subsidiaries: Panel of Experts (2009−2024)
- Website: www.un.org/securitycouncil/sanctions/1718

The UN Security Council Sanctions Committee on North Korea (formally named Security Council Committee Established Pursuant to Resolution 1718) is a subsidiary body established in 2006 by the UN Security Council's resolution 1718 in response to North Korea's first nuclear test and its other nuclear proliferation efforts.

Resolution 1718 imposed a series of economic sanctions on the DPRK and established a committee to gather more information, specify the sanctions, monitor them, and issue recommendations. The committee's responsibilities have broadened as subsequent resolutions expanded and strengthened sanctions, which include an arms embargo, a ban on luxury goods, financial sanctions, and limitations on export of mining resources.

From 2009 to 2024, a Panel of Experts (PoE) supported the work of the committee through expert analysis, particularly in evaluating cases of non-compliance. While the committee can make legally-binding decisions on how to specifically execute the sanctions (by naming which entities are targeted, for example), the PoE only had an informational and advisory role in support of those decisions. The PoE was disbanded in April 2024 after Russia used its Security Council veto to block the renewal of its mandate.

== Establishment ==
The committee was established pursuant to resolution 1718 (2006) to oversee the relevant sanctions measures relating to the Democratic People's Republic of Korea (DPRK).

Excerpts of the UN Security Council Resolution 1718

Expressing the gravest concern at the claim by the Democratic People’s Republic of Korea (DPRK) that it has conducted a test of a nuclear weapon on 9 October 2006, and at the challenge such a test constitutes to the Treaty on the Non-Proliferation of Nuclear Weapons and to international efforts aimed at strengthening the global regime of non-proliferation of nuclear weapons, and the danger it poses to peace and stability in the region and beyond,(...)

8. Decides that:

(a) All Member States shall prevent the direct or indirect supply, sale or transfer to the DPRK (...)

12. Decides to establish, in accordance with rule 28 of its provisional rules of procedure, a Committee of the Security Council consisting of all the members of the Council, to undertake the following tasks:

(a) To seek from all States, in particular those producing or possessing the items, materials, equipment, goods and technology referred to in paragraph 8 (a) above, information regarding the actions taken by them to implement effectively the measures imposed by paragraph 8 above of this resolution and whatever further information it may consider useful in this regard;
(b) To examine and take appropriate action on information regarding alleged violations of measures imposed by paragraph 8 of this resolution;
(c) To consider and decide upon requests for exemptions set out in paragraphs 9 and 10 above;
(d) To determine additional items, materials, equipment, goods and technology to be specified for the purpose of paragraphs 8 (a) (i) and 8 (a) (ii) above;
(e) To designate additional individuals and entities subject to the measures imposed by paragraphs 8 (d) and 8 (e) above;
(f) To promulgate guidelines as may be necessary to facilitate the implementation of the measures imposed by this resolution;
(g) To report at least every 90 days to the Security Council on its work, with its observations and recommendations, in particular on ways to strengthen the effectiveness of the measures imposed by paragraph 8 above;

Resolution 1718 (2006), Adopted by the Security Council at its 5551st meeting, on 14 October 2006.

Additional functions were entrusted to the committee in resolutions 1874 (2009), 2087 (2013), 2094 (2013), 2270 (2016), and 2321 (2016). In 2017, the committee began to track the procurement of DPRK coal by Member States. The committee is formed by representatives of all UNSC members.

== Panel of experts ==
Panel of Experts
- Abbreviation: PoE
- Formation: 2006
- Founder: UN Security Council, in resolution 1718
- Defunct: 2024
- Purpose: To assist the Sanctions 1695 Committee on North Korea in carrying out its mandate, gathering, examining and analyzing information, making recommendations, and issuing reports
- Location: New York, USA
- Region served: Democratic People's Republic of Korea
- Fields: Economic sanctions
- Parent organization: Security Council Committee Established Pursuant to Resolution 1718 (2006)
- Website: www.un.org/securitycouncil/sanctions/1718/panel_experts/work_mandate (archived)

From 2006 to 2024 the committee was supported by a Panel of Experts (PoE) that was established by UNSC resolution 1718 to assist the committee in carrying out its mandate; gathering, examining and analyzing information from States regarding the implementation of the measures (including incidents of non-compliance); making recommendations to improve implementation of the measures imposed; and issuing reports.

It was composed of eight experts and was based in New York City. Its mandate had been extended annually through resolutions 1928 (2010), 1985 (2011), 2050 (2012), 2094 (2013), 2141 (2014), 2207 (2015), 2276 (2016), 2345 (2017), 2407 (2018), 2464 (2019), 2515 (2020), 2569 (2021), 2627 (2022), and 2680 (2023).

In 2024 the UNSC did not extend the PoE's mandate, which expired on April 30 of that year. Of the 15 UNSC members, 13 voted in favor of renewing the mandate, China abstained, and Russia exercised its veto power. Russia and the DPRK had experienced a renaissance of their relationship especially in the previous two years as the latter had become an important supplier of war materiel to the former. The vote did not impact the sanctions themselves, only the monitoring. Several members observed that the PoE had recently been investigating breaches of the sanctions regime by the party who wielded the dismissal.

The panel acted under the direction of the committee and its members were appointed by the Secretary-General of the United Nations in consultation with the committee. They had specialized backgrounds in areas such as nuclear issues, other weapons of mass destruction and conventional arms, customs and export controls, weapons of mass destruction arms control and non-proliferation policy, finance, maritime transport and missile technology.

== Documents ==
=== Committee annual reports ===
- 2023 Annual Report (S/2023/1021) (PDF) (Report). Archived from the original on 2024-05-16.
- 2022 Annual Report (S/2022/1001) (PDF) (Report). Archived from the original on 2024-05-16.
- 2021 Annual Report (S/2021/1053) (PDF) (Report). Archived from the original on 2024-05-16.
- 2020 Annual Report (S/2020/1259) (PDF) (Report). Archived from the original on 2024-05-16.
- 2019 Annual Report (S/2019/971) (Report). Archived from the original on 2021-03-10.
- 2018 Annual Report (S/2018/1148) (PDF) (Report). Archived from the original on 2024-05-16.
- 2017 Annual Report (S/2017/1129) (PDF) (Report). Archived from the original on 2024-05-16.
- 2016 Annual Report (S/2016/1094) (PDF) (Report). Archived from the original on 2024-05-16.
- 2015 Annual Report (S/2014/920) (PDF) (Report). Archived from the original on 2024-05-16.
- 2014 Annual Report (S/2014/920) (PDF) (Report). Archived from the original on 2024-05-16.
- 2013 Annual Report (S/2013/756) (PDF) (Report). Archived from the original on 2024-05-16.
- 2012 Annual Report (S/2012/982) (PDF) (Report). Archived from the original on 2024-05-16.
- 2011 Annual Report (S/2012/17) (PDF) (Report). Archived from the original on 2024-05-16.
- 2010 Annual Report (S/2011/84) (PDF) (Report). Archived from the original on 2024-05-16.
- 2009 Annual Report (S/2010/28) (PDF) (Report). Archived from the original on 2024-05-16.
- 2008 Annual Report (S/2008/830) (Report).
- 2007 Annual Report (S/2007/778/Corr.1) (Report).

=== Panel of experts reports ===
- Final report of the Panel of Experts submitted pursuant to resolution 2680 (2024) (S/2024/215) (PDF) (Report). 7 March 2024. Archived from the original on 2024-05-15.
- Final report of the Panel of Experts submitted pursuant to resolution 2627 (2023) (S/2023/171) (PDF) (Report). 7 March 2023. Archived from the original (PDF) on 2024-03-29.
- Final report of the Panel of Experts submitted pursuant to resolution 2569 (2021) (S/2022/132) (PDF) (Report). 1 March 2022. Archived from the original (PDF) on 2024-05-15.
- Final report of the Panel of Experts submitted pursuant to resolution 2515 (2020) (S/2021/211) (PDF) (Report). 4 March 2021. Archived from the original on 2024-05-15.
- Final report of the Panel of Experts submitted pursuant to resolution 2469 (2019) (S/2020/15) (PDF) (Report). 2 March 2020. Archived from the original on 2024-05-15.
- Final report of the Panel of Experts submitted pursuant to resolution 2407 (2018) (S/2019/171) (PDF) (Report). 5 March 2019. Archived from the original on 2024-05-15.
- Final report of the Panel of Experts submitted pursuant to resolution 2345 (2017) (S/2018/171) (PDF) (Report). 5 March 2018. Archived from the original on 2024-05-15.
- Final report of the Panel of Experts submitted pursuant to resolution 2276 (2016) (S/2017/150) (PDF) (Report). 27 February 2017. Archived from the original on 2017-06-22.
- Final report of the Panel of Experts submitted pursuant to resolution 2207 (2015) (S/2016/157) (PDF) (Report). 24 February 2016. Archived from the original (PDF) on 2024-05-15.
- Final report of the Panel of Experts submitted pursuant to resolution 2141 (2014) (S/2015/131) (PDF) (Report). 23 February 2015. Archived from the original (PDF) on 2024-05-15.
- Final report of the Panel of Experts submitted pursuant to resolution 2094 (2013) (S/2014/147) (PDF) (Report). 6 March 2014. Archived from the original (PDF) on 2024-05-15.
- Final report of the Panel of Experts submitted pursuant to resolution 2050 (2012) (S/2013/337) (PDF) (Report). 11 June 2013.
- Final report of the Panel of Experts submitted pursuant to resolution 1985 (2011) (S/2012/422) (PDF) (Report). 14 June 2012. Archived from the original (PDF) on 2024-05-15.
- Final report of the Panel of Experts submitted pursuant to resolution 1874 (2009) (S/2010/571) (PDF) (Report). 5 November 2010. Archived from the original (PDF) on 2024-05-15.

== See also ==
- Timeline of the North Korean nuclear program
- List of United Nations Security Council resolutions concerning North Korea
