= United Nations Security Council Resolution 188 =

UN Security Council Resolution 188
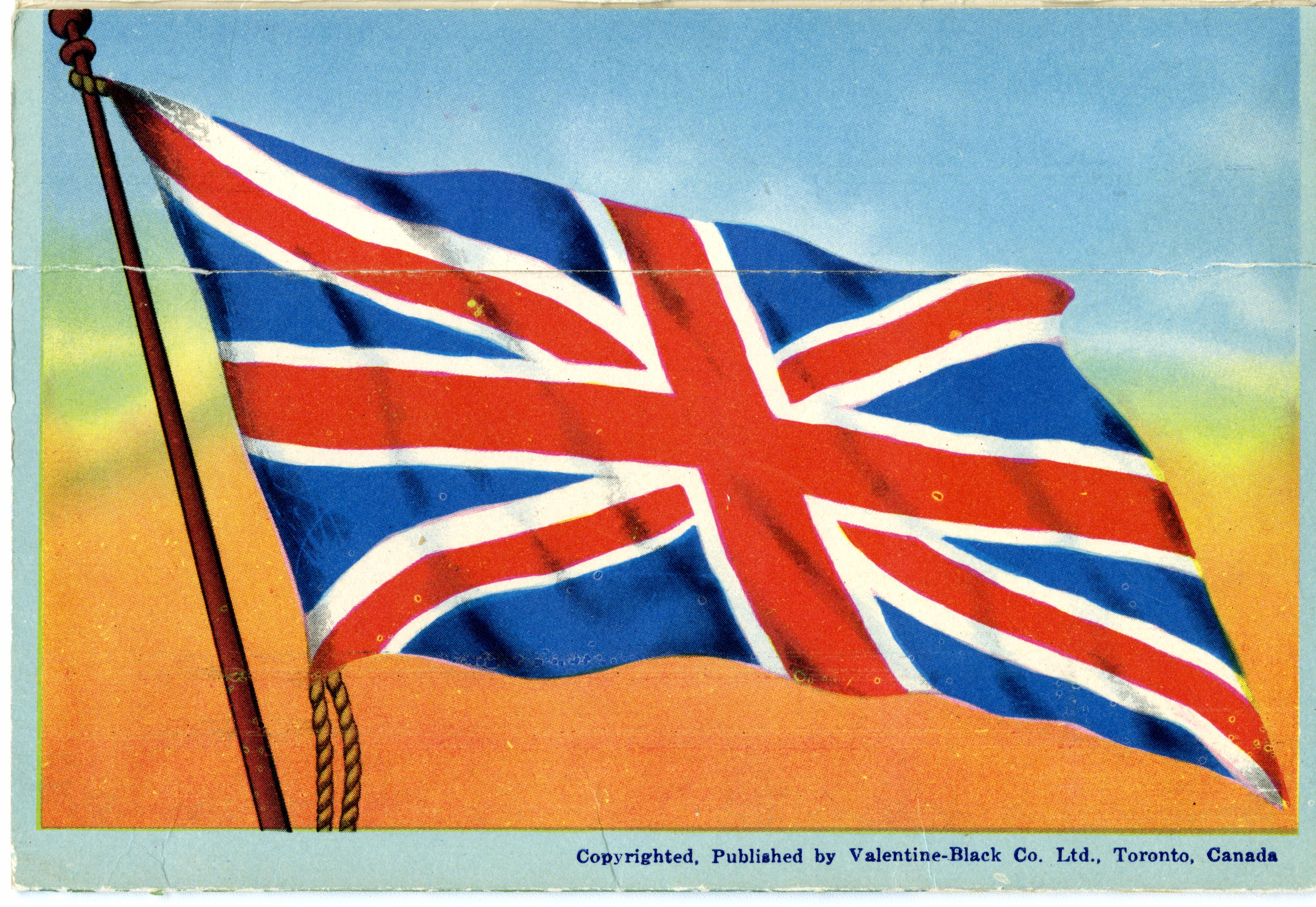
- UK flag
- Date: April 9 1964
- Meeting no.: 1111
- Code: S/5650 (Document)
- Subject: Complaint by Yemen
- Voting summary: 9 voted for; None voted against; 2 abstained
- Result: Adopted

Security Council composition
- Permanent members: China; France; Soviet Union; United Kingdom; United States
- Non-permanent members: Bolivia; Brazil; Czechoslovakia; Ivory Coast; Morocco; Norway

United Nations Security Council Resolution 188, adopted on April 9, 1964, after a complaint by the Yemen Arab Republic about a British air attack on their territory on March 28, the Council deplored the action at Harib as well as at least 40 other attacks that had occurred in that area. The United Kingdom had also complained that Yemen had violated the airspace of the Federation of South Arabia.

The Council asked the Yemen Arab Republic and the United Kingdom to exercise the maximum restraint in order to avoid future conflict and requested the Secretary-General use his good offices to try to settle the issue with the parties.

The resolution was adopted by nine votes to none, with the United Kingdom and the United States abstaining.

== See also ==
- List of United Nations Security Council resolutions concerning Yemen
- List of United Nations Security Council Resolutions 101 to 200 (1953–1965)
