= United Nations Security Council Resolution 29 =

United Nations Security Council resolution

UN Security Council Resolution 29
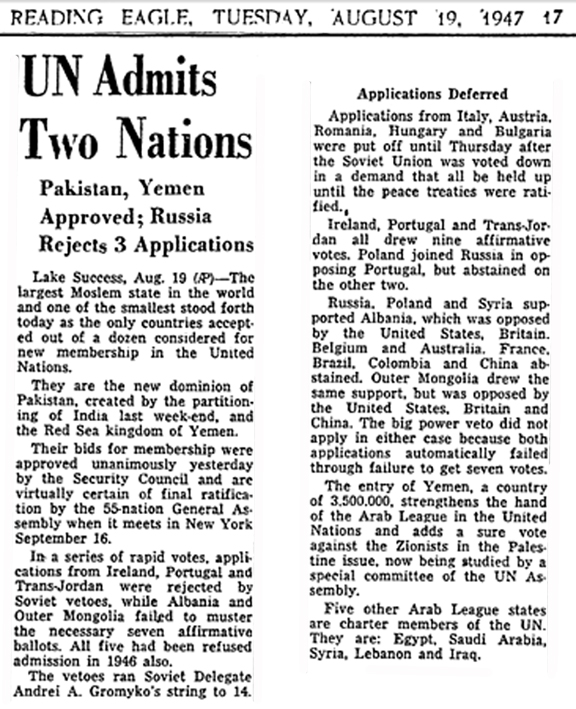
- Date: 12 August 1947
- Meeting no.: 190
- Subject: Admission of new members to the United Nations
- Voting summary: 11 voted for; None voted against; None abstained
- Result: Adopted

Security Council composition
- Permanent members: China; France; Soviet Union; United Kingdom; United States
- Non-permanent members: Australia; Belgium; Brazil; Colombia; Poland; Syria

United Nations Security Council Resolution 29 was adopted unanimously on 12 August 1947.

The Council reviewed requests for membership from the People's Republic of Albania, Austria, Bulgaria, the Hashemite Kingdom of Transjordan, Hungary, Ireland, Italy, the Mongolian People's Republic, Pakistan, Portugal, Romania, and Yemen. The Council recommended that the General Assembly admit Pakistan and Yemen as member states.

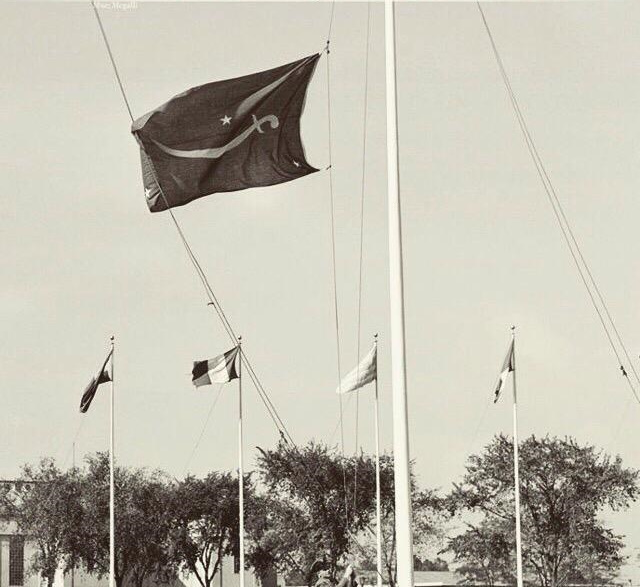
Flag of Yemen at the UN. 1947.

== See also ==
- Pakistan and the United Nations
- List of United Nations Security Council resolutions concerning Yemen
