= United Nations Security Council Resolution 2201 =

UN Security Council Resolution 2201
- Date: 15 February 2015
- Code: S/RES/2201(2015) (Document)
- Subject: Yemen
- Voting summary: 15 voted for; None voted against; None abstained
- Result: Adopted

Security Council composition
- Permanent members: China; France; Russia; United Kingdom; United States
- Non-permanent members: Angola; Chad; Chile; Jordan; Lithuania; Malaysia; New Zealand; Nigeria; Spain; Venezuela

The United Nations Security Council Resolution 2201 was unanimously adopted on 15 February 2015. The Security Council condemned the actions of the Houthis and demanded them to withdraw from the state institutions and release Yemeni president Abdrabbo Mansour Hadi.

== See also ==
- List of United Nations Security Council Resolutions 2201 to 2300
- List of United Nations Security Council resolutions concerning Yemen
