= United Nations Security Council Resolution 2207 =

UN Security Council Resolution 2207
- Date: 4 March 2015
- Meeting no.: 7,397
- Code: S/RES/2207 (Document)
- Subject: Extends mandate of expert panel monitoring Sanctions against North Korea
- Voting summary: 15 voted for; None voted against; None abstained
- Result: Adopted

Security Council composition
- Permanent members: China; France; Russia; United Kingdom; United States
- Non-permanent members: Angola; Chad; Chile; Jordan; Lithuania; Malaysia; New Zealand; Nigeria; Spain; Venezuela

On March 4, 2015, the United Nations Security Council unanimously adopted Resolution 2207 on North Korea. The resolution extended the mandate of the Panel of Experts, which supports activities of the ‘1718 Sanctions Committee’, for one year to April 5, 2016.

== Overview ==
The Panel supports the Committee in information collection and investigates and analyzes activities of North Korea and UN member states to find any violations of North Korea sanctions and trade embargoes imposed by the Security Council.

Based on the results, the Panel presents annual reports to the Security Council and recommends how to improve the implementation of sanctions.

Back on October 9, 2006, North Korea conducted its first nuclear test. On the following October 14, the Security Council adopted Resolution 1718 on North Korea and established the 1718 Sanctions Committee mandated to support and monitor UN member states for efficient implementation of the resolution and designate sanctions targets.

The Panel has been supporting the 1718 Sanctions Committee, although it was established pursuant to Resolution 1874 of 2009.

Through Resolution 2207, the Security Council extended the mandate of the Panel for one year to April 5, 2016, and requested the Panel to submit a comprehensive final report, containing the findings and recommendations as the results of its investigation over the year, to the Committee by February 5, 2016, and also to the Security Council by March 7, 2016.

== Background ==
The UN Security Council unanimously adopted Resolution 2207 with the primary aims of monitoring North Korea and enhancing the sanctions implementation by UN members states, as North Korea continued military provocations and illicit transactions while tactfully avoiding existing sanctions.

According to the U.S. multimedia Voice of America (VOA), the 1718 Sanctions Committee, also known as the North Korea Sanctions Committee, stated in its annual report, “There are 29 reported cases of North Korea having allegedly violated UN Security Council sanctions against North Korea in 2014”.

It was said that most of the cases were related to North Korea’s consistent launching of short-range ballistic missiles. When North Korea fired missiles over February–March and June–July 2016, the incidents were reported as suspected violations by six countries and seven countries, respectively. In March 2014, a letter was received claiming that North Korea attempted to sell sanctions target items. Additional information on the claim was received by the Committee in September 2014

According to the Panel of Experts report on February 26, 2015, Ocean Maritime Management (OMM), a North Korean shipping company listed in the sanctions targets on charges of including illicit weapons transfer, was avoiding sanctions by changing its vessel names.

In addition, North Korea launched two short-range ballistic missiles, presumed to be Scud missiles, into the Sea of Japan(East Sea) on March 2, 2015, when Key Resolve exercise took place.

In short, as North Korea repeated military provocations and illegal transactions while evading sanctions, the Security Council passed Resolution 2207 extending the mandate of the Panel to monitor UN member states’ sanctions implementation status and impose more practical sanctions against North Korea.

== Significance ==
The extension of the mandate of the Panel of Experts that supports activities of the 1718 Sanctions Committee, which was stated in Resolution 2207 passed by the Security Council, has exerted a considerable impact on North Korea sanctions of the international community.

The Panel submitted its seventh final report to the Security Council on February 3, 2016, in which the Panel recommended the Committee to add to the list of sanctions target entities ‘The Military Supplies Industry Department (Munitions Industry Department) of the Central Committee of the Workers' Party of Korea’ and ‘The National Aerospace Development Administration’ involved in “roles and support activities regarding the DPRK's nuclear and missile programs”.

The Panel also recommended to add to the list of sanctions target individuals Bak Do-Chun (former munitions secretary of the Workers’ Party), Ri Man-Gon (Minister of the Munitions Industry Department), and Ri Byong-Chul (first deputy of the Munitions Industry Department).

Such activities of the Panel have made a substantial contribution to the inclusion of comprehensive sanctions and additional sanctions on individuals and entities in Resolution 2270 which was adopted by the Security Council on March 2, 2016, after North Korea carried out its fourth nuclear test on January 6 and a long-range missile launch, or a satellite launch as it claimed, on February 7, 2016.

Meanwhile, four members of the Panel visited South Korea from July 11 to 15, 2016, where they held a discussion with the South Korean government about, including, measures to enhance the implementation of North Korea sanctions.

It was reported that the two parties exchanged opinions about North Korea’s violations of the Security Council sanctions and measures being taken by the international community. The parties, in particular, were known to have discussed the issue in depth, as North Korea fired a submarine launched ballistic missile (SLBM) on July 9, 2016, in violation of the sanctions.
