= United Nations Security Council Resolution 2388 =

UN Security Council Resolution 2388
- UN emblem
- Date: 21 November 2017
- Meeting no.: 8111
- Code: S/RES/2388 (Document)
- Subject: Maintenance of international peace and security
- Voting summary: 15 voted for; None voted against; None abstained
- Result: Adopted

Security Council composition
- Permanent members: China; France; Russia; United Kingdom; United States
- Non-permanent members: Bolivia; Egypt; Ethiopia; Italy; Japan; Kazakhstan; Senegal; Sweden; Ukraine; Uruguay

United Nations Security Council Resolution 2388 condemned human trafficking, in particular by the Islamic State of Iraq and the Levant (IS), as well as human rights violations by various African terror groups. The resolution was passed in a 15–0 vote, unanimously adopted by members of United Nations Security Council (UNSC). on November 21, 2017.

== Positions ==
Map of the migrant routes from West Africa to Europe.

This resolution followed a debate on human trafficking. Several countries referred to a report from CNN. It showed how African migrants were sold in Libya at slave markets.

The situation in Libya is exacerbated by the smuggling of migrants and human trafficking into, through and from the Libyan territory, which could provide support to other organized crime and terrorist networks in Libya.

A week later, at the request of France, the Security Council met again in connection with that report. The country felt that Libya should work on the promised investigation of the practices, otherwise international sanctions would be imposed. Libya itself felt that it had become a victim of a smear campaign. Hundreds of thousands of migrants traveled through the country at a time when it was politically very unstable. Therefore, Libya could not be held responsible for international problems that it could not control.

The underlying causes of human trafficking were cited and unstable countries of origin, in areas affected by armed conflict, such as money-laundering, corruption, the smuggling of migrants and other forms of organized crime, including by making use of financial investigations in order to identify and analyze financial intelligence, as well as by reinforcing regional and international operational law enforcement cooperation. Secretary-General António Guterres thought that developed countries should take in more migrants. At that time, around 17,000 migrants were detained in centers in Libya. More than 100,000 people had already made the crossing to Italy that year.

The Secretary General and several countries argued that the way in which groups such as IS and Boko Haram forced women and children for the purpose of sexual slavery, sexual exploitation, forced labor, and all acts of trafficking, particularly the sale or trade in persons, possibly amounted to war crimes and crimes against humanity.

There were also countries that thought too many different anti-trafficking initiatives were being launched. That is why Spain proposed that the UNODC and other relevant entities should take the lead.

== Content ==
By means of resolution 2331 of eleven months earlier, countries were asked to cooperate against human trafficking in conflict areas as a source of financing for terrorism. In the meantime, the establishment of the Task Team on anti-trafficking in humanitarian action within the Global Protection Cluster, the development by UNODC of a structured system of data collection on trafficking in persons in the context of armed conflict, and the United Nations Security Council Counter-Terrorism Committee included the efforts of countries in this regard in its assessments of countries in the fight against terrorism.

The Security Council again condemned all acts of trafficking, particularly the sale or trade in persons undertaken by the “Islamic State of Iraq and the Levant”(ISIL, also known as Da’esh), including of Yazidis and other persons belonging to religious and ethnic minorities, and of any such trafficking in persons crimes and other violations and abuses committed by Boko Haram, Al-Shabaab, the Lord's Resistance Army, and other terrorist or armed groups for the purpose of sexual slavery, sexual exploitation, and forced labor, and underscores the importance of collecting and preserving evidence relating to such acts in order to ensure that those responsible can be held accountable.

Countries were called upon to step up the fight against human trafficking. Victims had to be well supervised. Countries also had to develop the necessary legislation to put an end to impunity. They could request support from the UNODC for this.

Countries that received refugees were asked to look out for victims of human trafficking. They were also asked not to keep children in connection with their immigration legislation, or as short as possible.

The Security Council itself would look at how peace operations and political missions could help in the fight against human trafficking.
