= United Nations Security Council Resolution 2249 =

UN Security Council Resolution 2249
- Date: 20 November 2015
- Meeting no.: 7,565
- Code: S/RES/2249 (Document)
- Subject: Prevention and suppression of Daesh terrorist attacks
- Voting summary: 15 voted for; None voted against; None abstained; None absent
- Result: Adopted

Security Council composition
- Permanent members: China; France; Russia; United Kingdom; United States
- Non-permanent members: Angola; Chad; Chile; Jordan; Lithuania; Malaysia; New Zealand; Nigeria; Spain; Venezuela

United Nations Security Council Resolution 2249 was unanimously adopted on 20 November 2015. It notably calls upon all Member States to redouble their efforts against both ISIL and the al-Nusra Front as well as other al-Qaeda affiliates as designated by the Security Council.

== Resolution ==
The resolution "unequivocally condemns in the strongest terms the horrifying terrorist attacks perpetrated by ISIL, also known as Da'esh", mentioning the June 2015 attack in Sousse, the October 2015 attack in Ankara, the October 2015 attack over Sinaï, the November 2015 Beirut attack and the November 2015 Paris attacks.

It calls upon "Member States that have the capacity to do so to take all necessary measures, in compliance with international law, (...) international human rights, refugee and humanitarian law (...) to redouble and coordinate their efforts to prevent and suppress terrorist acts committed specifically by ISIL also known as Da’esh as well as ANF, and all other individuals, groups, undertakings, and entities associated with al-Qaeda, and other terrorist groups, as designated by the United Nations Security Council."

== See also ==
- Al-Qaida Sanctions Committee
- List of United Nations Security Council Resolutions 2201 to 2300
