= United Nations Security Council Resolution 1969 =

UN Security Council Resolution 1969
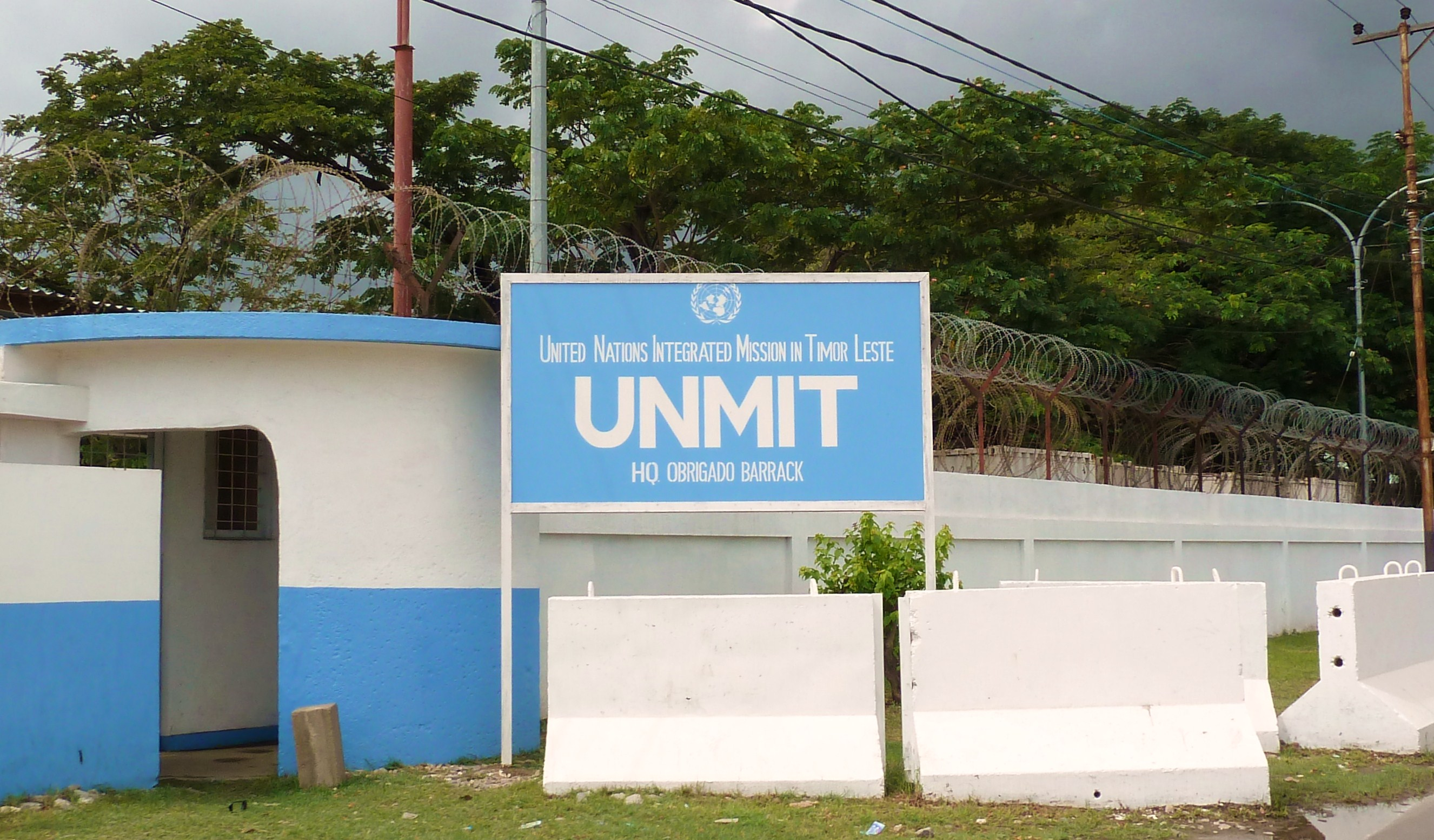
- UNMIT base
- Date: 24 February 2011
- Meeting no.: 6,487
- Code: S/RES/1969 (Document)
- Subject: The situation in East Timor
- Voting summary: 15 voted for; None voted against; None abstained
- Result: Adopted

Security Council composition
- Permanent members: China; France; Russia; United Kingdom; United States
- Non-permanent members: Bosnia–Herzegovina; Brazil; Colombia; Germany; Gabon; India; Lebanon; Nigeria; Portugal; South Africa

United Nations Security Council Resolution 1969 was adopted unanimously on February 24, 2011; after reaffirming resolutions 1599 (2005), 1677 (2006), 1690 (2006), 1703 (2006), 1704 (2006), 1745 (2007), 1802 (2008), 1867 (2009) and 1912 (2010) on the situation in East Timor (Timor-Leste), the Council decided to extend the mandate of the United Nations Integrated Mission in Timor-Leste (UNMIT) for a year, until February 26, 2012.

== Observations ==
In the preamble of the resolution, the Council noted improvements in the political and security situation in East Timor and urged continued efforts in this regard. It reaffirmed the importance of an independent judiciary and to act against impunity. There was progress with the policing responsibilities of the National Police of East Timor (PNTL), an improved justice system and anti-corruption measures undertaken by the government.

Furthermore, the Council praised the Timorese government for achieving strong economic growth and socio-economic development, but noted that the country still needs to address the reasons behind the crisis in 2006.

== Acts ==
The Security Council extended the mandate of UNMIT at its current levels of 1,520 uniformed personnel, 1,480 police and 1,200 civilian staff until February 26, 2012 and urged all Timorese parties to engage in political dialogue to consolidate democracy and social and economic development. UNMIT was requested to assist in preparations for the 2012 presidential and parliamentary elections. Meanwhile, the government was called upon to address reform of the security sector, including the PNTL.

The resolution endorsed the reconfiguration of UNMIT, taking into account the changing situation in East Timor and the plan for its drawdown. UMIT was asked to continue to provide law enforcement until the PNTL would assume its full responsibilities. Furthermore, the UNMIT operation was required to provide assistance in the field of human rights, reform of the judiciary and donor co-operation, while the government was asked to strengthen peacebuilding initiatives.

Finally, the Secretary-General Ban Ki-moon was instructed to monitor the situation in East Timor and report to the Council on progress made.

== See also ==
- 2006 East Timorese crisis
- History of East Timor
- List of United Nations Security Council Resolutions 1901 to 2000 (2009–2011)
