= United Nations Security Council Resolution 1912 =

UN Security Council Resolution 1912
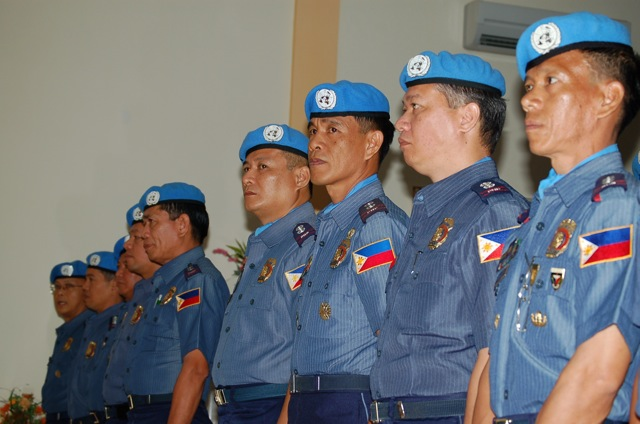
- Filipino police officers serving with UNMIT (2007)
- Date: 26 February 2010
- Meeting no.: 6,278
- Code: S/RES/1912 (Document)
- Subject: The situation in East Timor
- Voting summary: 15 voted for; None voted against; None abstained
- Result: Adopted

Security Council composition
- Permanent members: China; France; Russia; United Kingdom; United States
- Non-permanent members: Austria; Bosnia–Herzegovina; Brazil; Gabon; Japan; Lebanon; Mexico; Nigeria; Turkey; Uganda

United Nations Security Council Resolution 1912, adopted unanimously on February 26, 2010, after reaffirming resolutions 1599 (2005), 1677 (2006), 1690 (2006), 1703 (2006), 1704 (2006), 1745 (2007), 1802 (2008) and 1867 (2009) in addition to noting a report by the Secretary-General Ban Ki-moon, the Council decided to extend the mandate of the United Nations Integrated Mission in Timor-Leste (UNMIT) in East Timor until February 26, 2011.

The council also endorsed the Secretary-General's recommendation that the police component in UNMIT be reconfigured including its drawdown so that the policing responsibilities of the National Police of East Timor (PNTL) can be reinstated during a phased resumption, in accordance with the criteria mutually agreed between the Government of East Timor and UNMIT. According to the Secretary-General's report, the international police presence would be reduced from 1608 to 1280 by mid-2011. It urged both to continue to cooperate to expeditiously implement the resumption process, further requesting UNMIT to ensure the maintenance of public security and to intensify efforts to assist with further training and strengthening the PNTL.

The resolution stated the need for operations and rules of engagement to be regularly updated as necessary, and to be fully in line with the resolution's provisions. It asked the Secretary-General to report back to the council on this matter and that of troop and police-contributing countries within 30 days of the adoption of the current resolution. The council also reaffirmed the importance of accountability and justice, expressing its support of UNMIT in assisting the Timorese government while addressing reform of the justice system.

The Council called on UNMIT to co-operate with other United Nations actors and other relevant organisations in East Timor to support the Timorese government and other institutions in designing plans relating to poverty reduction, improving education and promoting sustainable livelihood and economic growth. Additionally, it called on the Government of East Timor to strengthen peacebuilding initiatives particularly with regard to employment by focusing on rural areas and youth, as well as socio-economic development. Prior to the adoption of the current resolution, UNMIT's chief Ameerah Haq said that, since unrest in 2006, the country had made "remarkable progress" but warned that long-term recovery and development goals would be challenging.

Resolution 1912 concluded by requesting the Secretary-General to report back to the council by October 15, 2010, on elements concerning the reconfiguring of the police component of UNMIT, and no later than January 26, 2011, regarding possible adjustments to UNMIT's mandate and strength.

== See also ==
- 2006 East Timorese crisis
- History of East Timor
- List of United Nations Security Council Resolutions 1901 to 2000 (2009–2011)
