= United Nations Security Council Resolution 1703 =

UN Security Council Resolution 1703
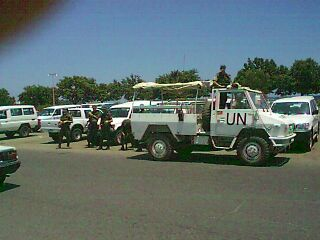
- UNOTIL truck in Dili
- Date: 18 August 2006
- Meeting no.: 5,514
- Code: S/RES/1703 (Document)
- Subject: The situation in East Timor
- Voting summary: 15 voted for; None voted against; None abstained
- Result: Adopted

Security Council composition
- Permanent members: China; France; Russia; United Kingdom; United States
- Non-permanent members: Argentina; Rep. of the Congo; Denmark; Ghana; Greece; Japan; Peru; Qatar; Slovakia; Tanzania

United Nations Security Council Resolution 1703, adopted unanimously on August 18, 2006, after reaffirming previous resolutions on East Timor (Timor-Leste), particularly resolutions 1599 (2005), 1677 (2006) and 1690 (2006), the Council renewed the mandate of the United Nations Office in Timor-Leste (UNOTIL) until August 25, 2006.

The technical resolution was adopted to allow more time for discussions on a new peacekeeping mission, which would later become known as the United Nations Integrated Mission in East Timor, adopted in Resolution 1704 (2006).

== See also ==
- 2006 East Timorese crisis
- East Timor Special Autonomy Referendum
- List of United Nations Security Council Resolutions 1701 to 1800 (2006–2008)
- Operation Astute
