= Sri Indera Sakti-class support ship =

Malaysian military ship class

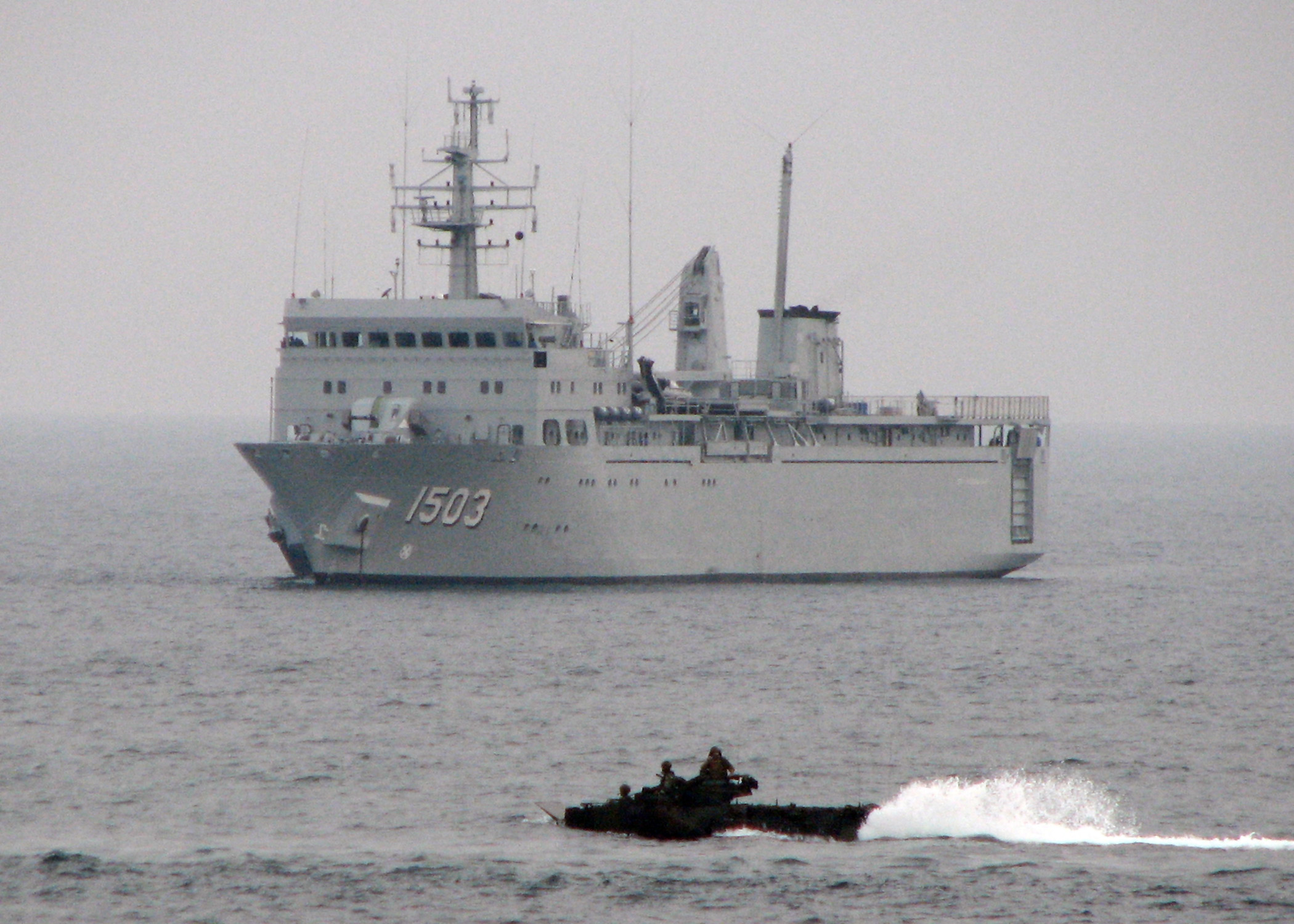
- KD Sri Indera Sakti

Class overview
- Builders: Bremer Vulkan
- Operators: Royal Malaysian Navy
- Preceded by: KD Sri Inderapura
- Completed: 2
- Active: 2

General characteristics
- Type: Support ship
- Displacement: 4,300 long tons (4,369 t) full load
- Length: 100 m (328 ft 1 in)
- Beam: 15 m (49 ft 3 in)
- Draught: 4.75 m (15 ft 7 in)
- Propulsion: 2 diesels, 2 shafts, 2 CPP by Schaffran Propeller + Service GmbH VK72/4 5,986 bhp (4,464 kW)
- Speed: 16.8 knots (19.3 mph; 31.1 km/h)
- Capacity: 600 troops; 1,000 m³ cargo space; 10 × 20-foot containers; 680 m² vehicle space
- Complement: 136 + 75 passengers
- Armament: 1 or 2 x Bofors 57 mm guns; 2 × Oerlikon 20 mm guns
- Aviation facilities: Helicopter landing platform

The Sri Indera Sakti class is a class of support vessels of the Royal Malaysian Navy (RMN) with various roles. The class contains two ships: KD Sri Indera Sakti (1503) and KD Mahawangsa (1504).

== Development ==
The Sri Indera Sakti class was built by Bremer Vulkan in Germany. KD Sri Indera Sakti was completed and handed over to the RMN on 24 October 1980 while KD Mahawangsa was completed and handed over to RMN on 16 May 1983.

The name of the class was taken from an island in the Perak River and Kinta River, which is close to the Anson Bay Town (now Teluk Intan). The island was originally known as Cempaka Sari Island. After Sultan Iskandar Zulkarnain was proclaimed the 15th Sultan of Perak, he had moved and settled on the island and named it Indera Sakti which means Panca Indera Sakti. The island is the trading center of merchants and stopovers from all over the world. The main trading merchandise is iron and ore.

== Characteristics ==
The ships were designed as a platform of support and it was able to stay in the operational area for a long period of two months. To enable the ships to carry out its role as a support ship, they are able to support up to six small-sized patrol boats such as Mine Counter Measures Vessel (MCMV) and Patrol Craft (PC). There are also various stores, containers, residences and workshops that enable the vessels to provide assistance as soon as possible to other vessels. KD Sri Indera Sakti is armed with one Bofors 57 mm gun and two 20mm automatic cannon while KD Mahawangsa is armed with two Bofors 57 mm guns and two 20 mm automatic cannon. Both ships are able to accommodate one medium size helicopter.

== Major operation ==
KD Mahawangsa has been dispatched to aid victims of the 2004 Indian Ocean earthquake, and to send humanitarian aid to Afghan refugees in 2001. She also delivered armoured infantry vehicles from 4th Infantry Brigade (Mech) as part of peacekeeper forces for Operation Astute during the 2006 East Timor crisis.

Both ships also actively took part in the fight against piracy in the Gulf of Aden in December 2008. In the same month, KD Sri Indera Sakti successfully aided the Chinese ship MV Zhenhua 4.

In 2009, the KD Sri Indera Sakti dispatched two helicopters that successfully repelled two Somali pirate skiffs attempting to capture the Indian tanker MT Abul Kalam Azad.

== Ships of the class ==
Pennant	Name	Builders	Launched	Commissioned	Division/Squadron	Notes
1503	KD Sri Indera Sakti	Bremer Vulkan	TBA	1980	Squadron 31st MPCSS	
1504	KD Mahawangsa	Bremer Vulkan	TBA	1983	Squadron 31st MPCSS	

== Gallery ==
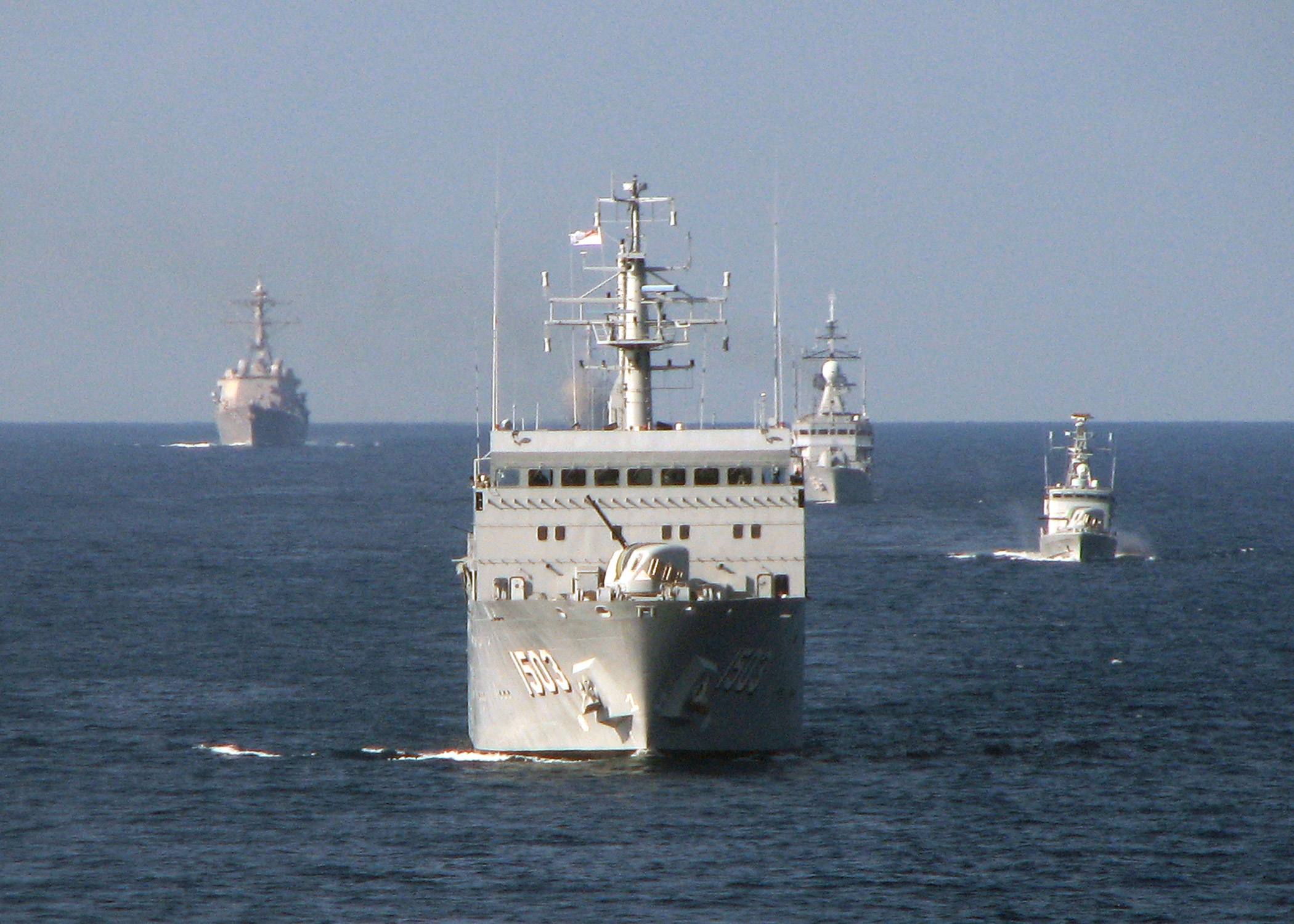
KD Sri Indera Sakti during CARAT exercise in 2009.

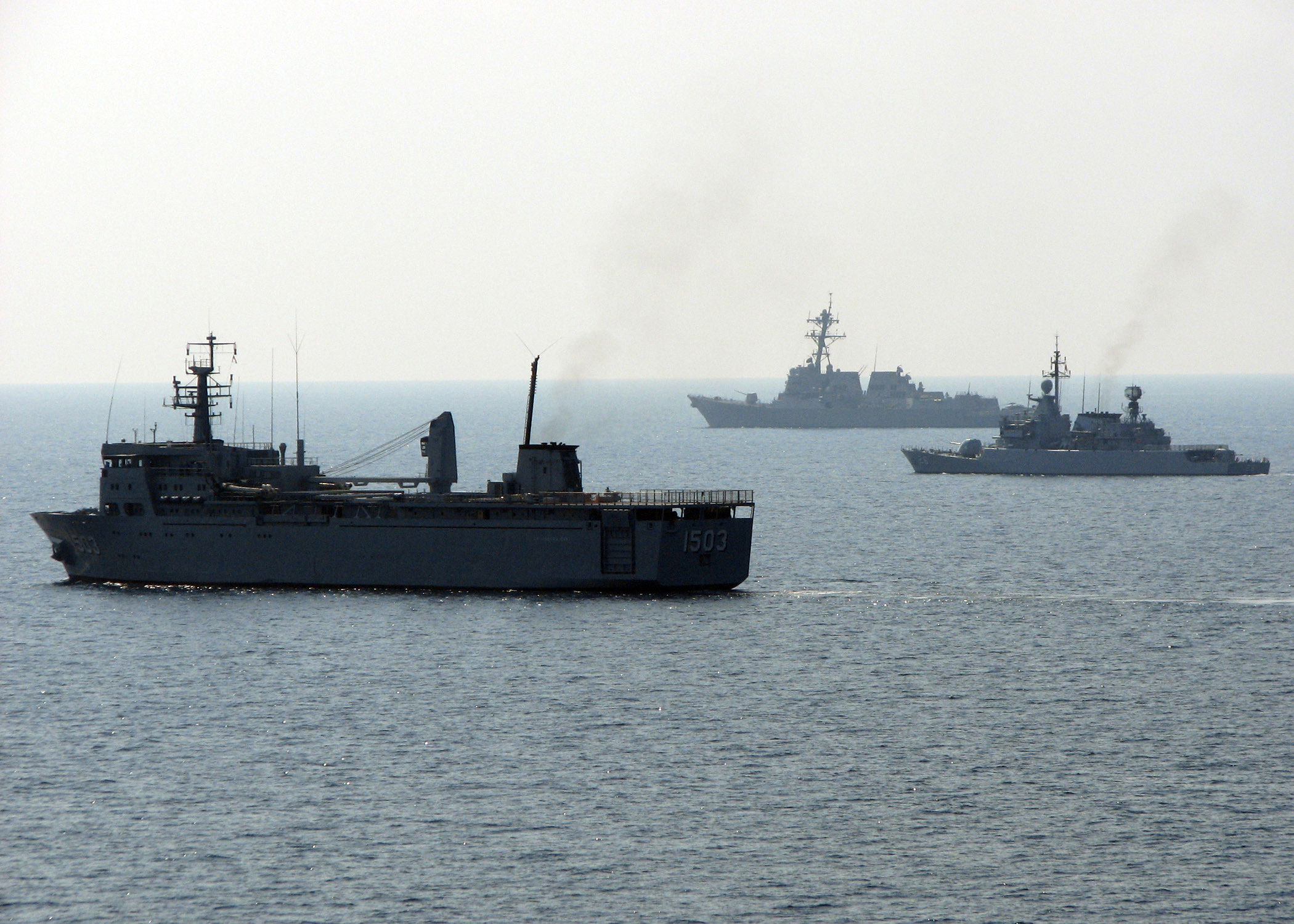
KD Sri Indera Sakti, KD Lekir and USS Chung-Hoon in CARAT exercise 2009.

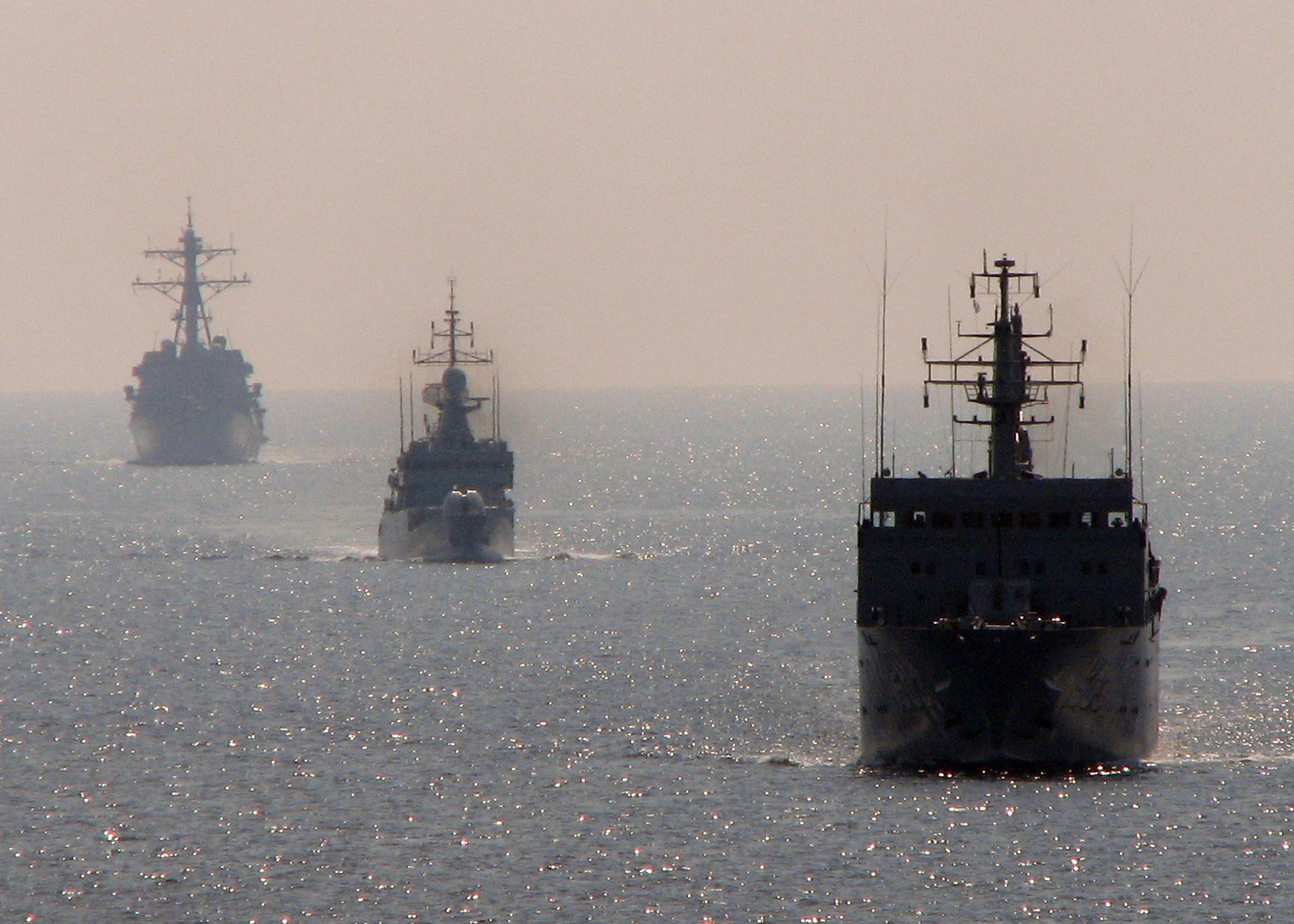
KD Sri Indera Sakti and other ships in CARAT exercise 2009.

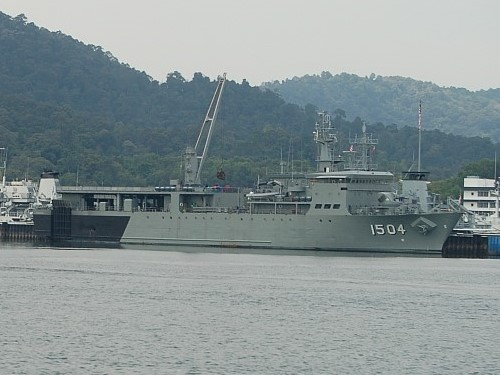
KD Mahawangsa berthed at Lumut Naval Base.
