= Sukehiro Hasegawa =

Japanese academic, educator, author and administrator

- 長谷川 祐弘
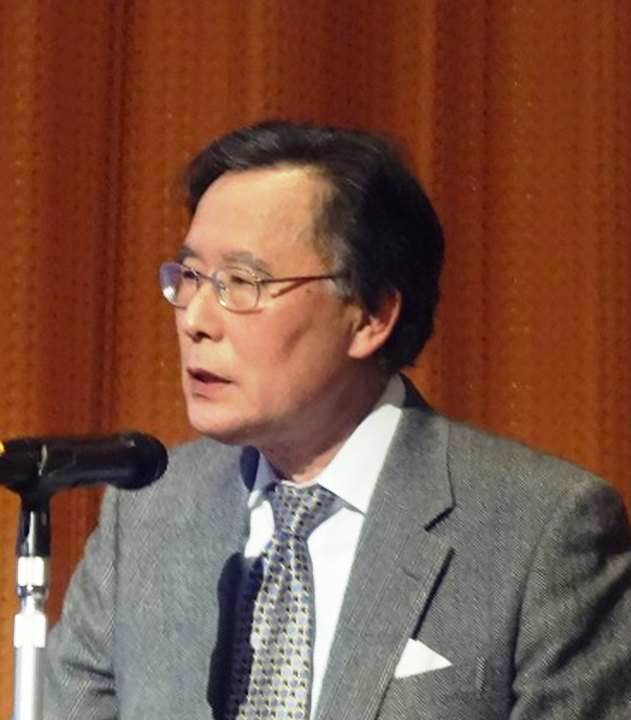
- symposium on "Diplomats who Saved Jewish People" held at Hosei University in 2012
- Born: November 28, 1942 (age 83)
- Education: University of Michigan; Washington University in St. Louis
- Occupations: President, Global Peacebuidling Association of Japan
- Known for: Special Representative of the Secretary-General for East Timor (May 2004 - September 2006)
- Website: www.shasegawa.com

Sukehiro Hasegawa (長谷川 祐弘, Hasegawa Sukehiro; born November 28, 1942) is a Japanese academic, educator, author and administrator. He served as the Special Representative of the Secretary-General of the United Nations for Timor-Leste and head of peacekeeping and peacebuilding missions, UNMISET, UNOTIL and UNMIT from May 2004 to September 2006. He is currently the President of the Global Peacebuidling Association of Japan, the ACUNS (Academic Council on the United Nations System) Liaison Officer in Tokyo, the Chair of the Hiroshima Peacebuilders Center (HPC) Council and the Personal Advisor to former president and Prime Minister José Ramos-Horta of Timor-Leste.

== Education ==
Hasegawa holds a Bachelor of Arts degree in political science from the University of Michigan, a Master of Arts degree in public administration from International Christian University of Tokyo, and a Ph.D. in international relations from Washington University in St. Louis, Missouri.

== Professional career ==
=== With the United Nations ===
Hasegawa entered the United Nations Development Programme (UNDP) in 1969, and then spent 37 years of his professional career as an international civil servant. He was Deputy Resident Representative of UNDP in Nepal from 1978 to 1980 and in Indonesia from 1980 to 1984. He later served as UNDP Resident Representative and Resident Coordinator of the United Nations operational activities for development in Samoa, Cook Islands, Niue, and Tokelau. In 1987, he was appointed Deputy Executive Coordinator of the UN Volunteers Programme. In 1993, after a Japanese UN Volunteer District Electoral Supervisor and a Cambodian interpreter were killed in an ambush, Hasegawa participated, on behalf of the UN Volunteers Programme, in the management of the resulting crisis that affected the UN Transitional Authority in Cambodia (UNTAC). In April 1994, he was appointed Director of Policy and Planning of the United Nations peacekeeping operation in Somalia, and in January 1995, he became the United Nations Resident and Humanitarian Coordinator in Rwanda. He subsequently served as the Deputy Assistant Administrator and Deputy Regional Director for Asia and the Pacific of UNDP in New York City from 1996 to 1999.

=== In East Timor ===
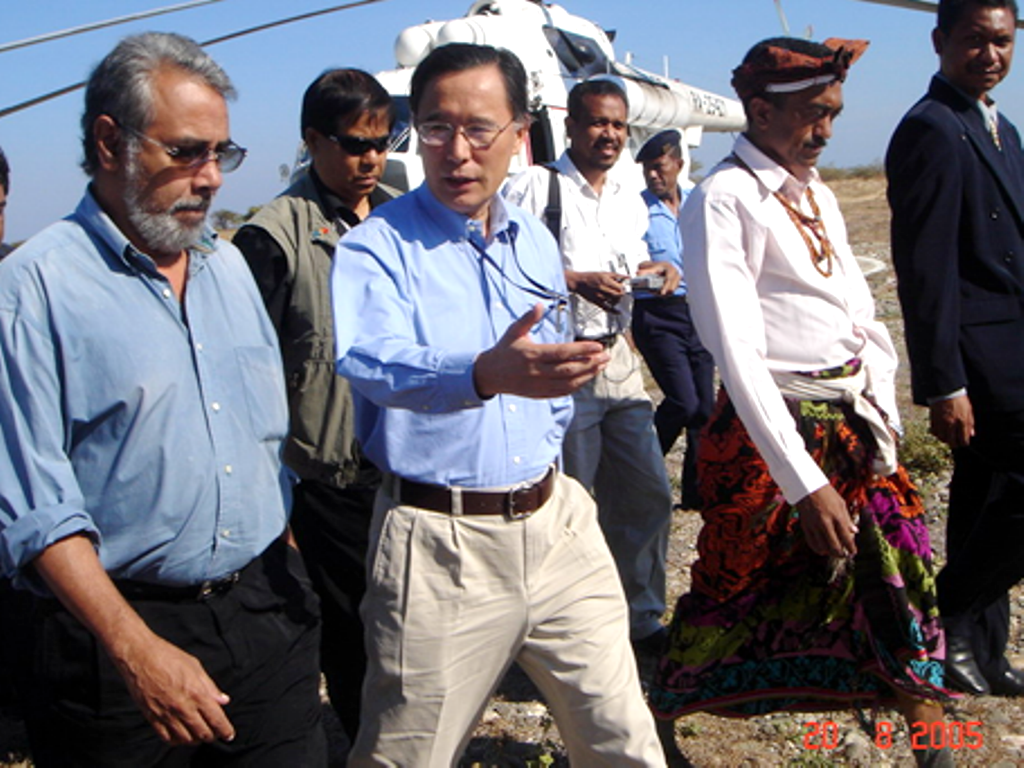
Hasegawa with Xanana Gusmão in Timor-Leste in 2005

From July 2002 to September 2006, he served as the United Nations Resident Coordinator for East Timor, and also served first as Deputy Special Representative of the Secretary-General for East Timor and Deputy Head of UNMISET from 1 July 2002 to 20 May 2004. Hasegawa was appointed Head of the United Nations Office in East Timor, UNMISET, and Special Representative of the Secretary-General for East Timor on 21 May 2004 and served in that capacity until September 2006. In October 2006, he was appointed a Goodwill Ambassador to East Timor, and then served as the Special Adviser to both President José Ramos-Horta (2007-2012) and Prime Minister Xanana Gusmão (2013-2015) of East Timor. He currently serves José Ramos-Horta as the Personal Adviser since January 2015.

=== Academic career ===
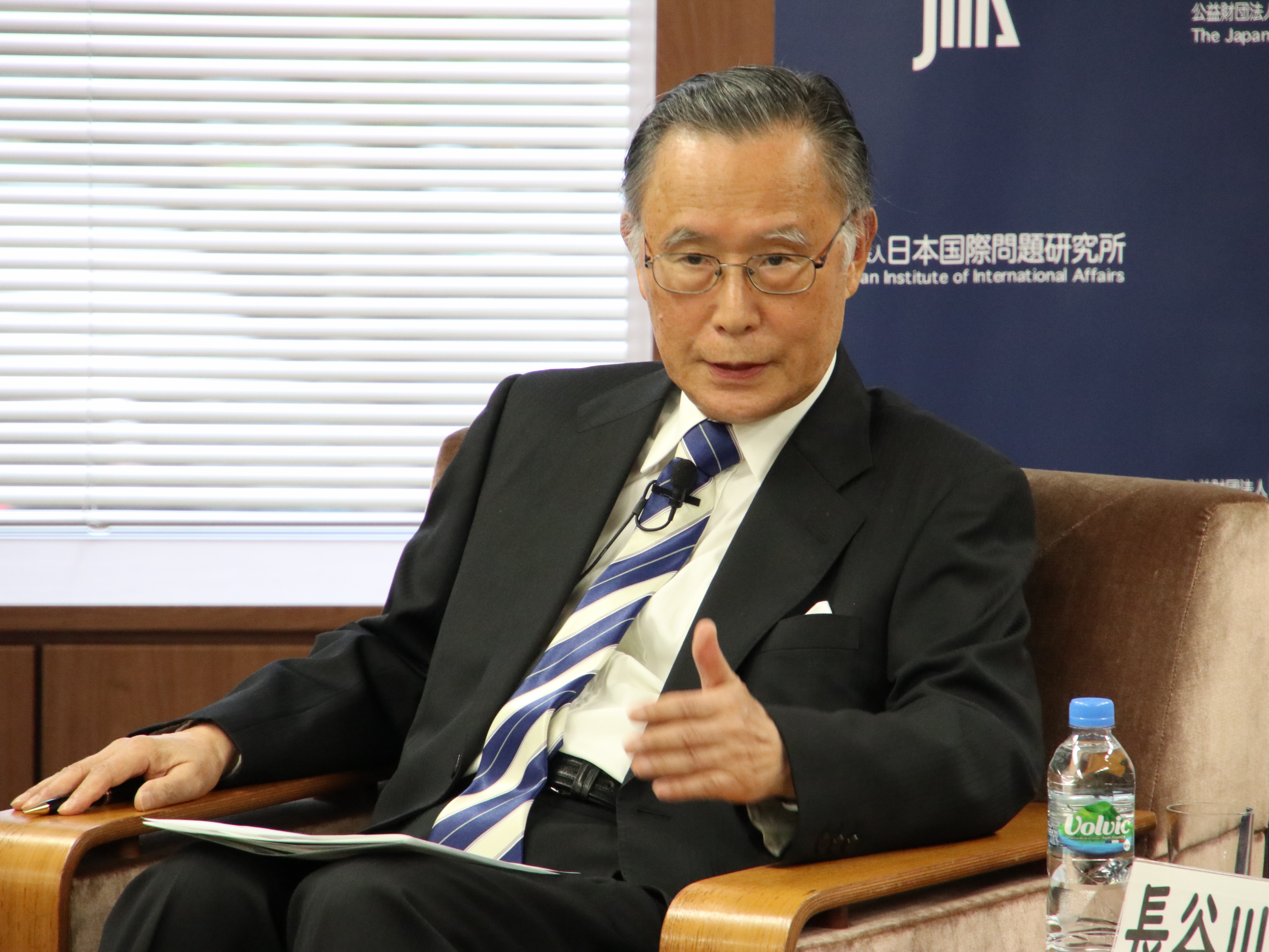
Sukehiro Hasegawa at the JIIA Forum in 2018

From April 2007 to March 2016, Hasegawa had been teaching at Hosei University on peace-building, international organizations, contemporary foreign policy and global governance. He has been an invited as a speaker and a senior mentor at many meetings, conferences and seminars including those held in Kuala Lumpur, Malaysia in 2009, Cairo, Egypt in 2009 and 2010, Yaoundé, Cameroon in 2012, Hiroshima and Tokyo, Japan in 2007–2013 on peacekeeping and peacebuilding operations.

=== Positions ===
Hasegawa is the President of the Global Peacebuidling Association of Japan, member of the Board of Directors of the United Nations Association of Japan (UNAJ), the Japan Association of United Nations Studies (JAUNS), and member of the Earth Charter Commission for Asia and the Pacific. He is currently the ACUNS Liaison Officer in Tokyo after he served as a member of the Board of Directors (2013-2015) and the executive committee (2014-2015) of the Academic Council on United Nations System (ACUNS).

== Publications ==
- Hasegawa, Sukehiro (2019). "Stimmen zu Deutschland im Sicherheitsrat 2019/2010: Visionäre Fihrugngsrolle nötig". Zeitschrift für die Vereinten Nationen und ihre Sonderorganisationen, 2/19 (Deutsche Gesellscnaft für die Vereinten Nationen e.V.): 74. ISSN 0042-384X.
- Hasegawa, Sukehiro (2018). United Nations Peacebuilding. Nippon Hyoron Sha Co., Ltd. ISBN 9784535587168.
- Hasegawa, Sukehiro (2017). Daisaku Higashi (ed.). "Role of Leaders in Peacebuilding of Timor-Leste: Lessons Learned from National Crisis of 2006". Human Security and Peacebuilding. Nippon Hyoron Sha Co., Ltd.: 51–70. ISBN 9784535587007.
- Hasegawa, Sukehiro (2017). "Meeting of Heads of UN Association of Japan, China and Korea - Improved Selection Process for the Secretary-General of the United Nations and Discussion of Conflict Prevention of Japan, China and Korea". United Nations Journal. 2017 (Spring). The United Nations Association of Japan: 15–25.
- Hasegawa, Sukehiro (2016). "Post-Conflict Leadership: Key to Building Sustainable Peace and Development". UN Chronicle. LII (4).
- Hasegawa, Sukehiro (2015). "Japan and the United Nations: Its Past, Present and Future." in Japan's Development Assistance: Foreign Aid and the Post-2015 Agenda, edited by Hiroshi Kato et al. Palgrave Macmillan: 239–254. ISBN 9781137505378.
- Hasegawa, Sukehiro (2013). Primordial leadership: Peacebuilding and national ownership in Timor-Leste. United Nations University Press. ISBN 9789280812244.
- Hasegawa, Sukehiro (2013). "United Nations: Sukehiro Hasegawa". Swiss News. 2013 (5). Stéphanie Thomson: 40–41.
- Hasegawa, Sukehiro (2012). "UN PEACE MISSION LEADERSHIP: Achieving Unity of Efforts". Academic Council on the United Nations System Quarterly Newsletter. 2012 (4). Alistair Edgar, Executive Director, ACUNS: 3–5.
- Hasegawa, Sukehiro (December 2010). "The G20 and the United Nations in Global Economic Governance". Korean Journal of International Organization. 5: 5–32.
- Hasegawa, Sukehiro (2010). "Building trust in government in Timor-Leste: The roles and strategies of United Nations missions." in Building trust in government: Innovations in governance reform in Asia, edited by G. Shabbir Cheema and Vesselin Popovski. United Nations University Press: 221–233. ISBN 9789280811896.
- Hasegawa, Sukehiro (1996). Rwanda: United Nations Situation Report. Office of the Resident Coordinator.
- Hasegawa, Sukehiro (1975). The objectives of foreign aid: Japanese aid for domestic prosperity and international ascendency. Hasegawa.
- Hasegawa, Sukehiro (1975). Japanese Foreign Aid: Policy and Practice. Praeger. ISBN 9780275055103.
- Hasegawa, Sukehiro; Hoadley, J. Stephen (June 1971). "Sino-Japanese Relions 1950-1970: An Application of the Linkage Model of International Politics". International Studies Quarterly. 15 (2): 131–157. doi:10.2307/3013547. JSTOR 3013547.
- Hasegawa, Sukehiro (1967). The road to international cooperation: discussion of issues in international relations. University of Michigan.

== See also ==
- 2006 East Timorese crisis
