= United Nations Security Council Resolution 1704 =

UN Security Council Resolution 1704
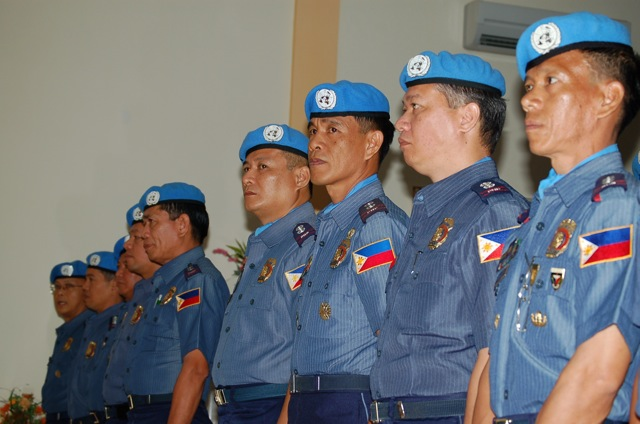
- UNMIT police
- Date: 25 August 2006
- Meeting no.: 5,516
- Code: S/RES/1704 (Document)
- Subject: The situation in East Timor
- Voting summary: 15 voted for; None voted against; None abstained
- Result: Adopted

Security Council composition
- Permanent members: China; France; Russia; United Kingdom; United States
- Non-permanent members: Argentina; Rep. of the Congo; Denmark; Ghana; Greece; Japan; Peru; Qatar; Slovakia; Tanzania

United Nations Security Council Resolution 1704, adopted unanimously on August 25, 2006, after reaffirming previous resolutions on East Timor (Timor-Leste), particularly resolutions 1599 (2005), 1677 (2006), 1690 (2006) and 1703 (2006), the Council established the United Nations Integrated Mission in East Timor (UNMIT) for an initial period of six months.

The passage of the resolution saw UNMIT replace the United Nations Office in East Timor (UNOTIL), the fifth mission in seven years.

== Resolution ==
=== Observations ===
The Council praised East Timor for attempts to resolve the political conflicts, but it was concerned at the fragility of the situation. There was full support for troops sent in by Australia, Malaysia, Portugal and New Zealand in an attempt to restore stability. It also held the view that parliamentary and presidential elections were a step forward in strengthening the country's democracy.

Meanwhile, the Council reaffirmed the need for accountability for crimes committed in East Timor during violence in 1999.

=== Acts ===
The resolution established UNMIT for a period of six months, with the intention of further renewals. It would consist of up to 1,608 police personnel with 34 military liaison and staff officers. The mission was to be headed by the Special Representative of the Secretary-General and was given the following mandate:

- Offer support to the government;
- Support the upcoming elections;
- Support the police in restoring order;
- Establish a presence in border districts;
- Assist the government in reform of the military;
- Strengthen state institutions;
- Strengthen human rights institutions and to promote justice and reconciliation;
- Facilitate the provision of humanitarian assistance;
- Co-ordinate with United Nations agencies, funds, programmes and donors;
- Consider gender equality and the needs of children in the mission mandate;
- Provide information to the general public, particularly regarding the 2007 elections;
- Ensure the safety of the East Timorese people;
- Monitor progress in all the above areas.

The Secretary-General Kofi Annan was urged to conclude a status of forces agreement with the East Timorese government. Meanwhile, East Timor was called upon to ensure free and fair elections. Finally, the Secretary-General was required to report on developments on the ground, including ensuring compliance with the zero-tolerance sexual exploitation policy; in this context, further changes to the mission's mandate or composition would be considered.

== See also ==
- 2006 East Timorese crisis
- East Timor Special Autonomy Referendum
- List of United Nations Security Council Resolutions 1701 to 1800 (2006–2008)
- Operation Astute
