= KD Sri Indera Sakti =

Ship built in 1980

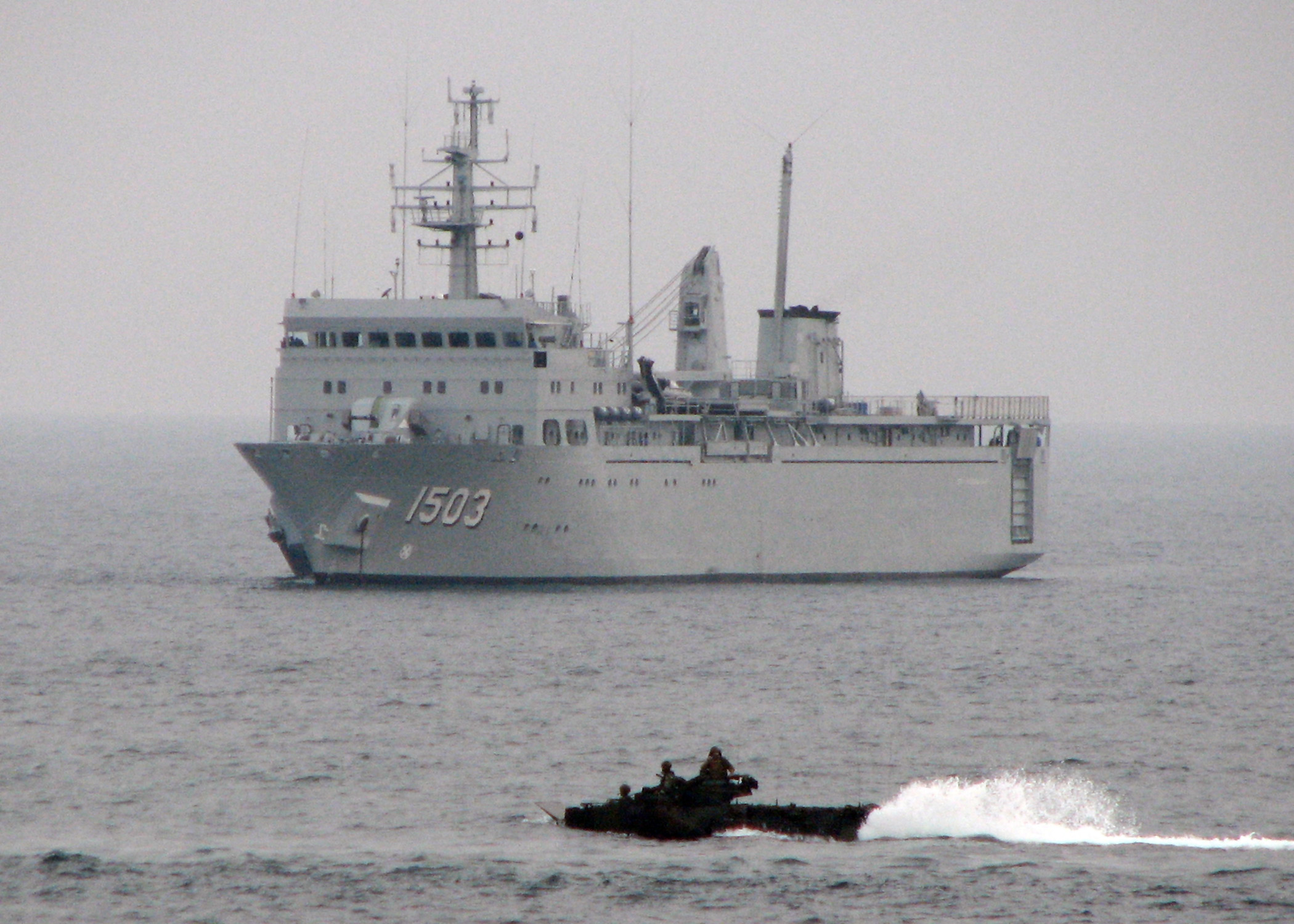
- KD Sri Indera Sakti

History

Malaysia
- Name: KD Sri Indera Sakti
- Builder: Bremer Vulkan
- Launched: 1 July 1980
- Commissioned: 1980
- Identification: IMO number: 7928574; Hull number: 1503
- Status: In active service
- Badge

General characteristics
- Class & type: Sri Indera Sakti-class support ship
- Displacement: 4,300 long tons (4,369 t) full load
- Length: 100 m (328 ft 1 in)
- Beam: 15 m (49 ft 3 in)
- Draught: 4.75 m (15 ft 7 in)
- Propulsion: 2 diesels, 2 shafts, 2 CPP by Schaffran Propeller + Service GmbH VK72/4 5,986 bhp (4,464 kW)
- Speed: 16.8 knots (19.3 mph; 31.1 km/h)
- Capacity: 600 troops; 1,000 m³ cargo space; 10 × 20-foot containers; 680 m² vehicle space
- Complement: 136 + 75 passengers
- Armament: 1 × Bofors 57 mm gun; 2 × Oerlikon 20 mm guns
- Aviation facilities: Helicopter landing platform

KD Sri Indera Sakti is 4,300-ton, 100-meter multi-role support ship of the Royal Malaysian Navy (RMN) based in the Lumut Naval Base in Perak, Malaysia.

== Major operation ==
The ship was sent to Somali waters to take over the role of the similar KD Mahawangsa to fight piracy in the Gulf of Aden in December 2008. In the same month, it successfully aided Chinese crane ship MV Zhenhua 4.

In 2009, KD Sri Indera Sakti dispatched two helicopters that successfully repelled two Somali pirate skiffs attempting to capture the Indian tanker MT Abul Kalam Azad.

She participated at the International Fleet Review 2026 held at Visakapatanam and hosted by the Indian Navy.
