= United Nations Security Council Resolution 1867 =

UN Security Council Resolution 1867
- Date: 26 February 2009
- Meeting no.: 6,086
- Code: S/RES/1867 (Document)
- Subject: The situation in Timor Leste
- Voting summary: 15 voted for; None voted against; None abstained
- Result: Adopted

Security Council composition
- Permanent members: China; France; Russia; United Kingdom; United States
- Non-permanent members: Austria; Burkina Faso; Costa Rica; Croatia; Japan; Libya; Mexico; Turkey; Uganda; Vietnam

United Nations Security Council Resolution 1867 was unanimously adopted on 26 February 2009.

== Resolution ==
Recognizing the important role that the United Nations Integrated Mission in Timor-Leste (UNMIT) continues to play in promoting peace, stability and development in the country, the Security Council this morning decided to extend the Mission’s mandate for a further 12 months, at its current authorized levels.

Unanimously adopting resolution 1867 (2009), the Council welcomed, in its preambular paragraphs, the improvements in the political and security situation in Timor-Leste, which had recovered from the 2006 crisis and the attacks on the President and Prime Minister on 11 February 2008, but noted that the current political and security situation, although generally calm, remained fragile. (For further details of the situation and prior meeting of the Security Council, see Press Release SC/9598 of 19 February.)

The Council requested UNMIT to extend the necessary support for local elections this year, responding to the request from the Government of Timor-Leste, and encouraged the international community to assist in that process. The Mission was also encouraged to support the Government in its efforts to reform the security sector, strengthen legal frameworks, and enhance civilian oversight and the accountability mechanisms of security institutions. It was also called upon to continue to support the Government in its efforts to coordinate donor cooperation in areas of institutional capacity-building.

Further by the text, the Council supported gradual resumption of policing responsibilities by the national police, through a phased approach, while emphasizing that the Polícia Nacional de Timor-Leste (PNTL) must meet the criteria mutually agreed between the Government and UNMIT to guarantee its readiness for the resumption of such responsibilities in any given district. The Government and UNMIT were requested to cooperate with each other to implement that process.

Until the national police was fully reconstituted, the Mission would continue, through the presence of its police component and support to the PNTL, to maintain public security in the country. UNMIT, working with partners, was requested to intensify its efforts to assist with further training, mentoring, institutional development and strengthening of the PNTL, with a view to enhancing its effectiveness.

== See also ==
- List of United Nations Security Council Resolutions 1801 to 1900 (2008–2009)
