= United Nations Security Council Resolution 1745 =

UN Security Council Resolution 1745
- Date: 22 February 2007
- Meeting no.: 5,634
- Code: S/RES/1745 (Document)
- Subject: The situation in Timor Leste
- Voting summary: 15 voted for; None voted against; None abstained
- Result: Adopted

Security Council composition
- Permanent members: China; France; Russia; United Kingdom; United States
- Non-permanent members: Belgium; Rep. of the Congo; Ghana; Indonesia; Italy; Panama; Peru; Qatar; Slovakia; South Africa

United Nations Security Council Resolution 1745 was unanimously adopted on 22 February 2007.

== Resolution ==
With Timorese presidential elections less than two months away, the Security Council extended the mandate of the United Nations Integrated Mission in Timor-Leste (UNMIT) through February 2008, and approved a temporary reinforcement of the Mission's police by an additional unit of up to 140 officers to supplement existing law enforcement capacity, particularly during the pre- and post-electoral period.

Following the Secretary-General's call to "send an important signal of the Security Council’s willingness to sustain its commitment to Timor-Leste", the 15-nation Council unanimously adopted resolution 1745 (2007), extending the mandate of the United Nations Mission in the impoverished country until 26 February 2008. The country holds its presidential election in April, with parliamentary polls expected to follow two months later.

Reiterating its view that the forthcoming elections will be a significant step in the process of strengthening democracy, the Council called on all parties in Timor-Leste to adhere to the principles of non-violence and to democratic and legal processes to ensure that the upcoming elections have a unifying impact and contribute to bringing the people of Timor-Leste together, and encouraged all Timorese parties to ensure that free, fair and peaceful elections take place and that the timetable for polls developed by the National Commission on Elections is respected.

Expressing its concern over the still fragile and volatile security, political, social and humanitarian situation in Timor-Leste and welcoming initial efforts made in the security sector, the Council called on all Timorese parties, particularly the country's political leaders, to continue working together in a spirit of cooperation and compromise in order to consolidate progress made by Timor-Leste in recent years and to enable the country to move to a peaceful and more prosperous future.

== See also ==
- List of United Nations Security Council Resolutions 1701 to 1800 (2006–2008)
