= United Nations Security Council Resolution 1802 =

UN Security Council Resolution 1802
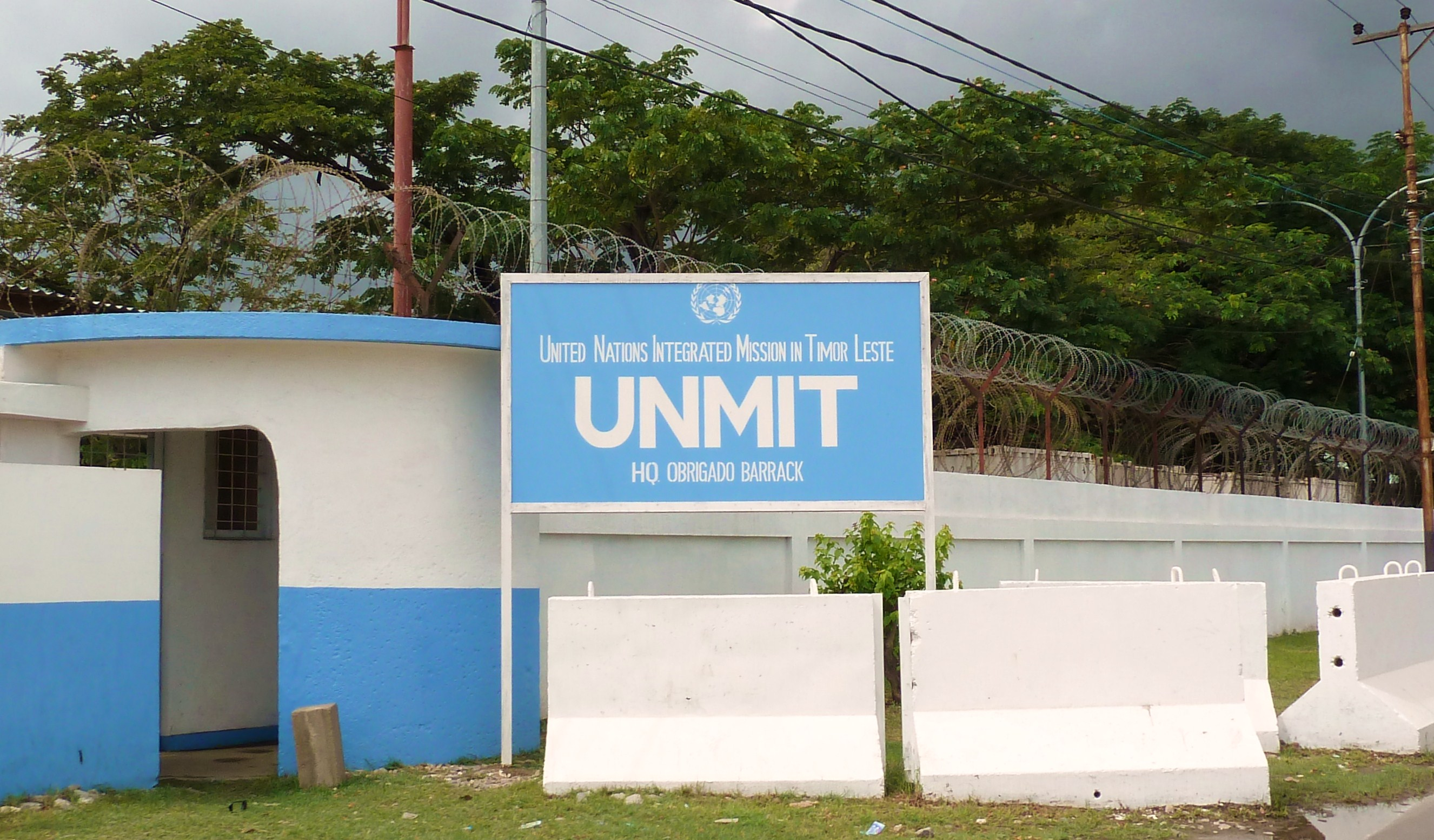
- UNMIT-HQ in Dili
- Date: 25 February 2008
- Meeting no.: 5,844
- Code: S/RES/1802 (Document)
- Subject: The situation in Timor Leste
- Voting summary: 15 voted for; None voted against; None abstained
- Result: Adopted

Security Council composition
- Permanent members: China; France; Russia; United Kingdom; United States
- Non-permanent members: Burkina Faso; Belgium; Costa Rica; Croatia; Indonesia; Italy; Libya; Panama; South Africa; Vietnam

United Nations Security Council Resolution 1802 was unanimously adopted on 25 February 2008.

== Resolution ==
The Security Council this morning extended the mandate of the United Nations Mission in Timor-Leste (UNMIT) for one year, until 26 February 2009, at the current authorized levels and condemned in the strongest possible terms the attacks on the President and Prime-Minister of Timor-Leste on 11 February as an attack on the legitimate institutions of the country.

The Council called on the Government of Timor-Leste to bring to justice those responsible for the 11 February attacks and for the people to remain calm, exercise restraint and maintain stability in the country.

The Council further called upon the Government, assisted by the United Nations Mission in Timor-Leste, to continue working on a comprehensive review of the future role and needs of the security sector. It requested UNMIT, working with partners, to intensify the efforts to assist with further training, mentoring, institutional development, and strengthening of the National Police Force of Timor-Leste (PNTL).

The Council unanimously adopted resolution 1802 (2008), submitted by Australia, New Zealand, Portugal and South Africa, after it had heard recommendations on the Mission by Under-Secretary-General for Peacekeeping Operations Jean-Marie Guéhenno and Timor-Leste’s Permanent Representative to the United Nations, Nelson Santos, on 21 February.

== See also ==
- List of United Nations Security Council Resolutions 1801 to 1900 (2008–2009)
