= United Nations Security Council Resolution 1690 =

UN Security Council Resolution 1690
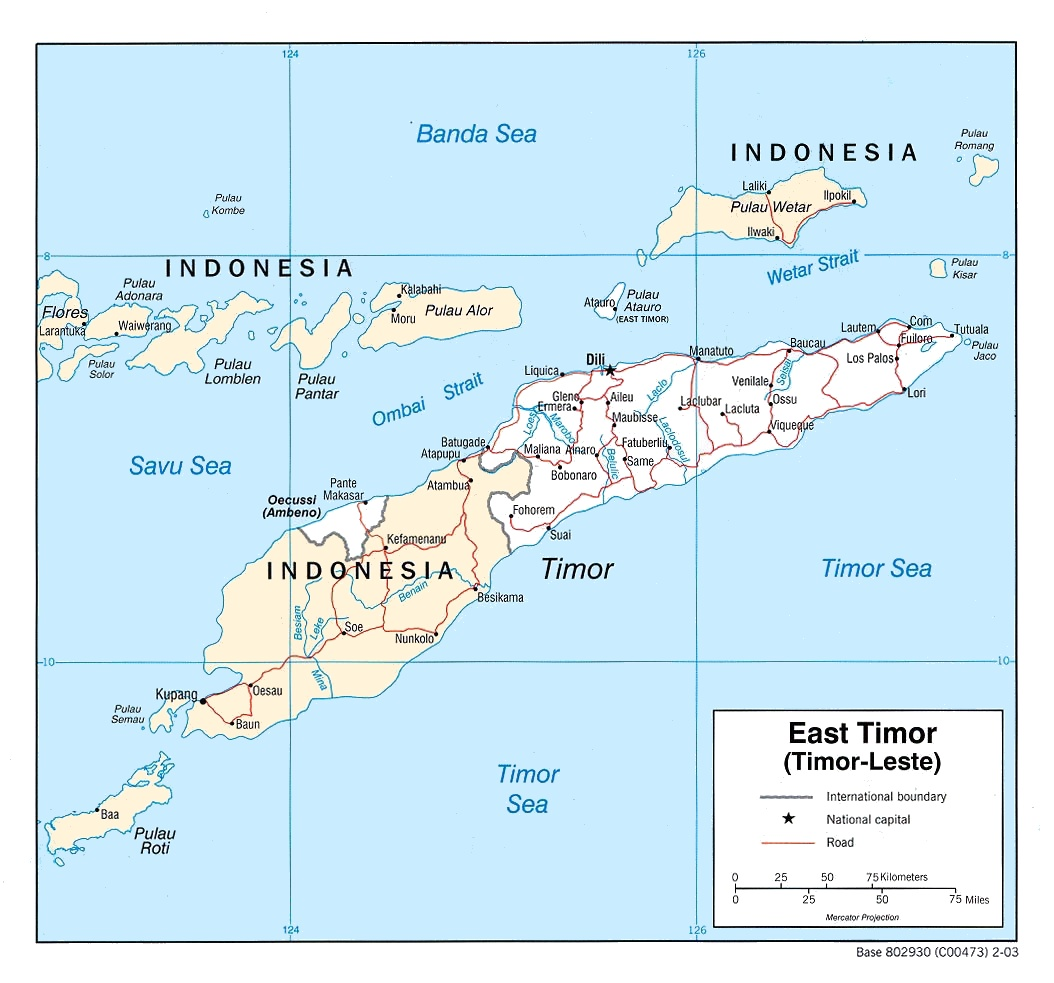
- East Timor
- Date: 20 June 2006
- Meeting no.: 5,469
- Code: S/RES/1690 (Document)
- Subject: The situation in East Timor
- Voting summary: 15 voted for; None voted against; None abstained
- Result: Adopted

Security Council composition
- Permanent members: China; France; Russia; United Kingdom; United States
- Non-permanent members: Argentina; Rep. of the Congo; Denmark; Ghana; Greece; Japan; Peru; Qatar; Slovakia; Tanzania

United Nations Security Council Resolution 1690, adopted unanimously on June 20, 2006, after reaffirming previous resolutions on East Timor (Timor-Leste), particularly resolutions 1599 (2005) and 1677 (2006), the Council renewed the mandate of the United Nations Office in Timor-Leste (UNOTIL) for two months until August 20, 2006.

== Resolution ==
=== Observation ===
The Security Council expressed concern over violence on the island and the humanitarian implications. It condemned attacks against people and property and welcomed steps by United Nations officials to assess the situation on the ground.

=== Acts ===
The Council decided to extend UNOTIL's mandate until August 20, 2006, with a view to strengthening the role of the United Nations in the country beyond the expiration of its mandate. It expressed full support for the deployment of security forces by Australia, Malaysia, Portugal and New Zealand to restore stability in East Timor, at the request of the government; the forces were also facilitating the delivery of humanitarian aid to those in need. Furthermore, the international forces were called upon to co-operate with the Timorese government and UNOTIL.

Meanwhile, all parties in East Timor were urged to refrain from violence. The resolution requested the Secretary-General Kofi Annan to report on the post-UNOTIL future by August 7, 2006, taking into account the current situation. An independent inquiry commission would be established to look into the events.

Finally, the donor community was urged to respond urgently to an appeal by the United Nations regarding humanitarian assistance to East Timor.

== See also ==
- 2006 East Timorese crisis
- East Timor Special Autonomy Referendum
- List of United Nations Security Council Resolutions 1601 to 1700 (2005–2006)
- Operation Astute
