= Ameerah Haq =

Bangladeshi politician

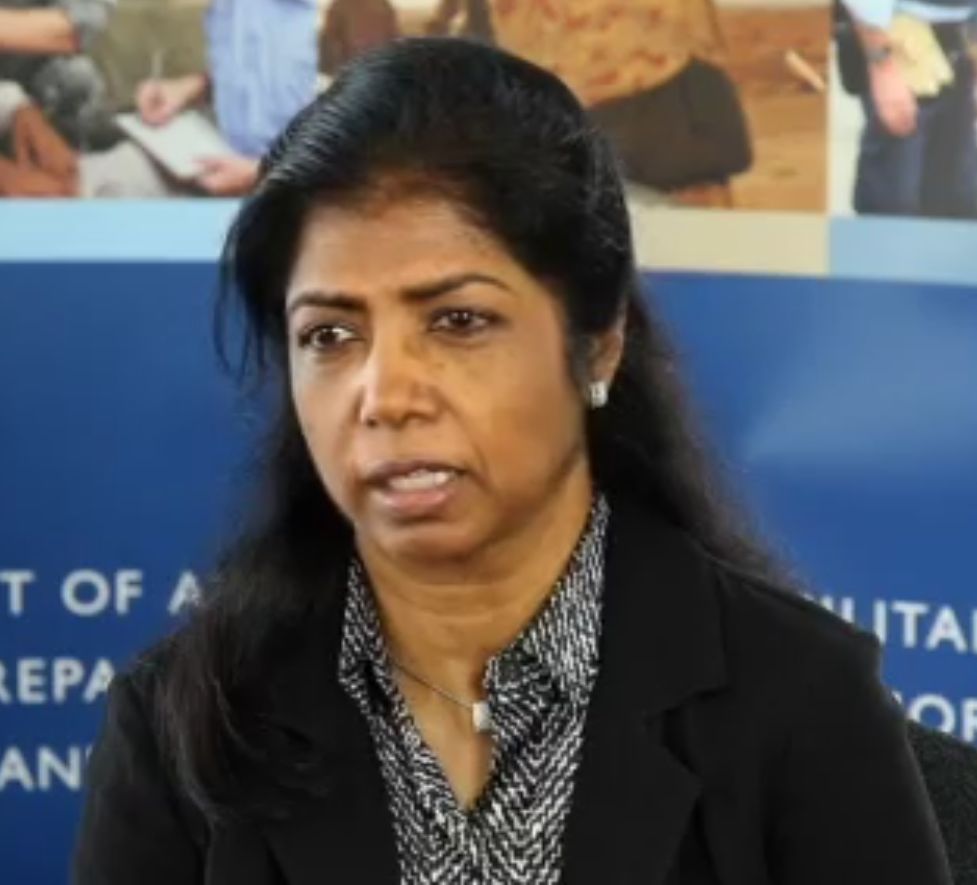
- Haq in 2011
- Born: Sylhet, Bangladesh
- Education: Western College for Women; Columbia University; New York University

Ameerah Haq is a Bangladeshi technocrat who served as United Nations Under-Secretary-General for the Department of Field Support, the highest-ranking Bangladeshi official at the United Nations, from April 2012 until her resignation in July 2014. Subsequently, UN Secretary General Ban Ki-moon appointed her as one of the co-chairs of the High-Level Independent Panel on Peace Operations. Haq also served as the Secretary-General's Special Representative for Timor-Leste and Head of the United Nations Integrated Mission in East Timor (UNMIT). Haq joined the UN in 1976.

In 2015, Haq was appointed as a member of the board of the Centre for Humanitarian Dialogue (HD), a private diplomacy organization whose mission is to help mitigate armed violence through dialogue and mediation.

== Previously held positions at UN ==
1. Special Representative of the Secretary-General for East Timor and Head of the United Nations Integrated Mission in Timor-Leste (UNMIT).
2. Deputy Special Representative of the Secretary-General as well as United Nations Resident Coordinator and Humanitarian Coordinator for Sudan
3. Deputy Special Representative of the Secretary-General and United Nations Resident Coordinator and Humanitarian Coordinator for Afghanistan.
4. Deputy Assistant Administrator and deputy director, Bureau of Crisis Prevention & Recovery, at United Nations Development Programme (UNDP) Headquarters in New York.

Haq has 37 years of United Nations career service (19 in the field and 18 at headquarters) and is considered by US as a seasoned and skilled negotiator as well as consensus-builder.

== Education ==
Haq completed Bachelor of Arts from Western College in Oxford, Ohio and later has performed Community organization and planning and in business administration from Western College for Women, Columbia University and New York University.

== Personal life ==
Haq has two children, Her daughter Nadina worked for the 2006 Nobel Peace Prize Laureate Dr. Yunus on social business initiatives..
