= KD Mahawangsa =

Royal Malaysian Navy multi-role support ship

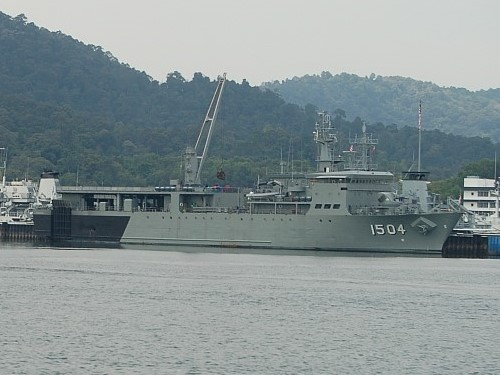
- KD Mahawangsa

History

Malaysia
- Name: KD Mahawangsa
- Builder: Bremer Vulkan
- Commissioned: 1983
- Identification: Hull number: 1504; MMSI number: 533001504; Callsign: 9MOY
- Status: In active service
- Badge

General characteristics
- Class & type: Sri Indera Sakti-class support ship
- Displacement: 4,300 long tons (4,369 t) full load
- Length: 100 m (328 ft 1 in)
- Beam: 15 m (49 ft 3 in)
- Draught: 4.75 m (15 ft 7 in)
- Propulsion: 2 x Deutz KHD SBV6M540 diesel, 5,986 bhp (4,464 kW), (4.31 MW), 2 shafts, cp props, bow thruster
- Speed: 16.8 knots (31.1 km/h; 19.3 mph)
- Range: 4,000 nmi (7,400 km; 4,600 mi) at 14 knots (26 km/h; 16 mph)
- Capacity: 600 troops; 1,000 m³ cargo space; 10 × 20-foot containers; 680 m² vehicle space
- Complement: 136 + 75 passengers
- Sensors & processing systems: Fire control: CSEE Naja optronic directors; Navigation: Kelvin Hughes 1007, I-band.
- Electronic warfare & decoys: ESM: Thales DR 3000, intercept
- Armament: 2 × Bofors 57 mm guns; 2 × Oerlikon 20 mm guns
- Aviation facilities: Helicopter landing platform

KD Mahawangsa is a Royal Malaysian Navy 4,300-ton multi-role support ship based at Lumut Naval Base in Perak, Malaysia. It was named in honor of Merong Mahawangsa, the founder of the Old Kedah. KD stands for Kapal DiRaja which means His Majesty's Ship in the Malay language.

== Major operation ==
The ship has been dispatched to aid victims of the 2004 Indian Ocean earthquake, rushed humanitarian aid to Afghan refugees in 2001, and delivered armoured infantry vehicles from 4th Infantry Brigade (Mech) as part of peacekeeper forces for Operation Astute during the 2006 East Timor crisis.

In her roles as a command ship, KD Mahawangsa has been involved in several joint exercises with foreign navies, such as the joint Malaysia-Thailand Naval exercises called THALAY LAUT, the Starfish exercises under the Five Power Defence Arrangement and the Cooperation Afloat Readiness and Training (CARAT) series of exercises held with the U.S. Navy. The closing ceremony for CARAT Malaysia 2004 was held aboard KD Mahawangsa, anchored off the island of Tioman.

In September 2008 KD Mahawangsa was sent to the Gulf of Aden after the hijacking of two MISC oil tankers by Somali pirates.
