= United Nations Mission of Support to East Timor =

Officially mandated mission in East Timor

- Abbreviation: UNMISET
- Formation: 20 May 2002
- Type: Government Support
- Legal status: Completed
- Parent organization: United Nations Security Council
- Website: www.un.org/etimor

The United Nations Mission of Support to East Timor (UNMISET) lasted from 20 May 2002 to 20 May 2005, when it was replaced by United Nations Office in Timor Leste (UNOTIL). It was established when East Timor became an internationally recognised independent state and the United Nations Transitional Administration in East Timor (UNTAET) came to an end.

Military and police forces from contributing nations were put under control of the Special Representative of the Secretary-General. Following a progress report submitted by the Secretary-General in 2003, the initial 12 month mandate was extended into two years, subsequently extended to 20 May 2005, after which it was replaced by United Nations Office in Timor Leste (UNOTIL).

A final report was then presented to the Security Council and a statement was made about the continuing help with a Border Patrol Unit.

The mandates of the Security Council Resolutions also provided for a Serious Crimes Unit to investigate the events of 1999.
