= Special Representative of the Secretary-General for East Timor =

The special representative of the secretary-general for East Timor was appointed by the secretary-general to lead the United Nations Transitional Administration in East Timor. During the transition from Indonesian rule to independence the United Nations appointed administrator fulfilled a role, which could be said to correspond in some ways to that of a head of state.

== List ==
Name	Country
Ian Martin (acting)	United Kingdom
Sérgio Vieira de Mello	Brazil
Kamalesh Sharma	India
Sukehiro Hasegawa	Japan
Atul Khare	India
Ameerah Haq	Bangladesh
Finn Reske-Nielsen	Denmark

== See also ==
- Special Representative of the Secretary-General
