= 2006 crisis in Timor-Leste =

Conflict over discrimination within the military

2006 Timor-Leste crisis
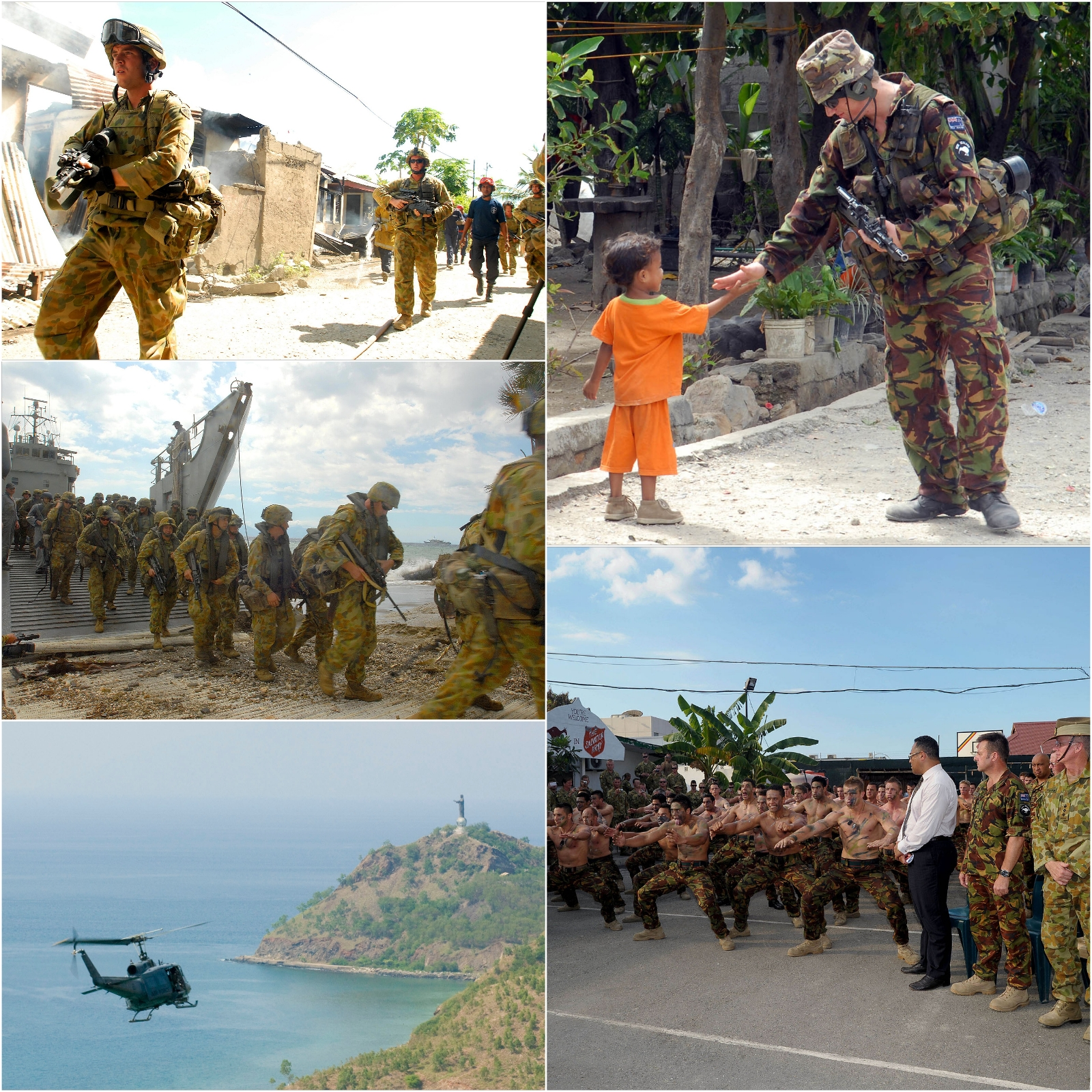
- Photos of ISF during the crisis
Date	24 April – 20 June 2006 (1 month, 3 weeks and 6 days)
Location	Timor-Leste
Result	Mari Alkatiri resigns as Prime Minister: 2007 East Timorese presidential election

Belligerents
F-DTL (Loyalist faction); FRETILIN; Australia; New Zealand; Malaysia; Portugal	F-FDTL (Rebel faction); CNRT

Commanders and leaders
Mari Alkatiri; José Ramos-Horta; Francisco Guterres; Taur Matan Ruak (Australia) Michael Slater	Gastão Salsinha; Alfredo Reinado; Xanana Gusmão

The 2006 Timor-Leste crisis began as a conflict between elements of the Timor-Leste Defence Force (F-FDTL) over discrimination within the military and expanded to a coup attempt and general violence throughout the country, centred in the capital Dili. The crisis prompted a military intervention by several other countries and led to the resignation of Prime Minister Mari Alkatiri.

== Background ==
A pretext for the crisis came from the management of a dispute within the F-FDTL, when soldiers from the western part of the country claimed that they were being discriminated against, in favour of soldiers from the eastern part of the country. The Loro Sae (Tetum for easterners) formed the largest part of Falintil, the guerrilla resistance movement which had resisted Indonesian authority, and which in turn, after final independence in 2002, formed the largest part of F-FDTL. In contrast the Loro Munu (Tetum for westerners) were less prominent in the resistance, and less favoured in the military structure. There had also been tension between the military and the police force, the latter of which was composed of more westerners and also some former members of the Indonesian military.

Location of East Timor

404 soldiers, out of the regular strength of about 1500, deserted their barracks on 8 February 2006, joined by 177 more on 25 February. The soldiers were ordered to return in March, but refused, and were relieved of duty. The soldiers were later joined by some members of the police force, and were initially led by Lt. Gastão Salsinha.

The foreign minister, José Ramos-Horta, announced early in April that a panel would be established to hear the complaints of the former soldiers, but added that "They are not going to be brought back into the army, except on a case-by-case basis when we establish the responsibilities of each individual in this whole incident".

There were political motivations behind the attacks on soldiers and the government. Those initiating the violence and killings declared loyalty to the then president Xanana Gusmao, who wanted to replace prime minister and Fretilin leader Mari Alkatiri.

== Violence ==
Map of Dili and immediate surroundings

On 24 April, the former soldiers and their civilian supporters, mostly unemployed youths, marched through the streets of the capital Dili in protest. The initially peaceful march turned violent when the soldiers attacked a market run by people from the east of the country. The protests continued over the next several days, until on 28 April the former soldiers clashed with FDTL forces, who fired on the crowd. In the resultant violence, five people were killed, more than 100 buildings were destroyed and an estimated 21,000 Dili residents fled the city.

On 4 May, Major Alfredo Reinado, along with 20 military police from a platoon under his command and four other riot police defected and joined the rebel soldiers, taking with them two trucks full of weapons and ammunition. After joining the soldiers, Reinado made his base in the town of Aileu in the hills south-west of Dili. There he and the military police guarded the road leading into the mountains.

On the evening of 5 May, the former soldiers under Salsinha's leadership drafted a declaration calling for President Xanana Gusmão to sack the Prime Minister Mari Alkatiri and abolish the FDTL within 48 hours. When Gusmão contacted Salsinha earlier that day in an attempt to prevent the issuing of the declaration, Salsinha told him that it was "too late".

The rebel soldiers remained in the hills above the capital, where they engaged in sporadic combat with FDTL forces over the next several weeks. Violent gangs also roamed the streets of Dili, burning down houses and torching cars. The civilians who fled Dili camped in tent cities nearby or in churches on the outskirts of the capital. One Catholic convent alone was providing Red Cross assistance to up to 7,000 people.

On 8 May a police officer was killed as a crowd of 1000 surrounded a government complex, the office of a regional state secretary, in a town outside Dili. On 9 May, Prime Minister Mari Alkatiri described the violence since 28 April as a coup, with "the aim of blocking the democratic institutions, preventing them to function in a way that the only solution would be for national parliament to be dissolved by the President... which would provoke the fall of the Government." However on 10 May Alkatiri announced that government officials had held negotiations with the rebel soldiers, in which it was agreed that the rebel soldiers would be paid a subsidy equal to their former military wage to assist their families.

The United Nations peacekeeping forces left Timor-Leste on 20 May 2005, and the remaining administrative staff and police at the United Nations Office in Timor Leste (UNOTIL) were scheduled to leave on 20 May 2006, but on 11 May their deadline was extended at least until June. The decision came alongside Foreign Minister Ramos-Horta's request to the UN's High Commissioner for Human Rights to investigate allegations of human rights violations by the Timor-Leste police forces, as alleged by Human Rights Watch and the United States Department of State. On 12 May, Prime Minister of Australia John Howard announced that although there had not been any formal requests for assistance from the Government of Timor-Leste, Australian forces were standing by in readiness to provide assistance, with the amphibious transport ships HMAS Kanimbla and HMAS Manoora moving to northern waters in preparation.

=== Caicoli massacre ===
The violence escalated late in May, as one FDTL soldier was killed and five wounded in a skirmish on 23 May. Foreign Minister Ramos-Horta sent out an official request for military assistance on 24 May, to the governments of Australia, New Zealand, Malaysia and Portugal. On 25 May, as the first international forces were arriving, some renegade soldiers were moving into Dili and engaging in combat with FDTL and police forces, with up to twenty people believed to have been killed. That day, FDTL soldiers acting in disobedience of a ceasefire and safe passage assurance by the Chief of the Armed Forces, General Taur Matan Ruak, massacred 8 to 10 unarmed police officers and wounded 27 others. Among the injured included a Filipino named Edgar Layon and a Pakistani.

== Intervention ==
Operation Astute is the name of the international military response to the crisis. Led by the Australian Defence Force, and commanded by Brigadier Michael Slater of the Australian 3rd Brigade, the operation involves forces from four countries.

=== Australia ===
The Prime Minister of Australia John Howard announced on 24 May that Australian forces would be deployed to Timor-Leste, with the composition of the force and the terms of engagement to be negotiated over the next few days. Australia initially offered between 1,000 and 1,300 infantry, three Royal Australian Navy ships (HMAS Manoora and HMAS Kanimbla already stationed nearby, and HMAS Tobruk) along with other support capabilities. The first unit sent in was the 4th Battalion, The Royal Australian Regiment 'Commando'.

On the afternoon of 25 May, four Black Hawk helicopters and a C-130 Hercules transport plane landed at Dili airport with the first wave of Australian forces. By 26 May it was expected that all Australian forces would have arrived in Timor-Leste by 27 May, a full day earlier than expected.

The deployment to Timor-Leste coincided with the withdrawal of about 260 of the 400 Australian soldiers deployed to the Solomon Islands. The 140 remaining would be supported by New Zealand and Fijian forces. However, Defence Minister Brendan Nelson said that the deployment to Timor-Leste would not overextend the Defence Force, saying that "we have much more in our back pocket".

=== Malaysia ===
Malaysia responded by deploying Malaysian troops, initially consisted of 219 army paratroopers and commandos. The soldiers were drawn from the 10th Brigade Paratroopers based in Camp Terendak, Malacca (Malaysia), and a unit of the army special force from Mersing Camp, Johor (Malaysia), headed by Col Ismeth Nayan Ismail. These formed part of the group of 275 military and 200 police personnel who have been put on alert for possible deployment. Malaysia had planned to send in a total of 500 personnel earlier. By 23 June, there were already 333 Malaysian personnel from both the police and military forces stationed in Dili.

Two Royal Malaysian Navy vessels—KD Mahawangsa and KD Sri Indera Sakti—ferried the equipment of the Malaysian troops, including armoured carriers, to Dili, arriving on 3 June. The troops had been taught the basics of the Tetum language, the spoken language of the locals, to introduce themselves as peacekeepers.

Upon arrival, Malaysian forces secured embassies, port, power stations, oil depot and hospitals in Timor-Leste. The diplomatic enclaves' security was given priority. Earlier, Timor-Leste President Xanana Gusmão had requested Malaysia guard the Timor-Leste-Indonesia border to prevent civilians from fleeing the country. Malaysia, however, refused to do so.

By mid-June, Malaysia announced a plan to send 250 police officers to Timor-Leste. The Malaysian police had trained the local police force four years previously. According to Radio Televisyen Malaysia, the 250-strong police force would leave for Timor-Leste at the end of June.

=== New Zealand ===
On 25 May 2006, Prime Minister of New Zealand Helen Clark requested more information as to exactly what support Timor-Leste would require from New Zealand, before committing any forces. She said that "It's very important not to walk into what is a factional dispute in some respects and be seen to be taking sides," and "It's also important to be mindful that the Security Council is having consultations as we speak."

On 26 May, New Zealand deployed 42 troops, with a second contingent of 120 troops leaving Christchurch on 27 May, en route to Townsville, Queensland before being sent to Timor-Leste. Prime Minister Clark said that the forces would be deployed where needed by the Australian command.

=== Portugal ===
The Portuguese Foreign Minister Freitas do Amaral announced an initial deployment of 120 Republican Guards on 24 May. They joined a group of eight high level officers from the Special Operations Group of the Portuguese Polícia de Segurança Pública. The Portuguese Air Force evacuated more than 600 Portuguese citizens residing in Timor.

The President of the Republic, Aníbal Cavaco Silva, as well as Prime Minister José Sócrates, called for an end to the violence. In a meeting with the Foreign Ministers of the European Union, the Foreign Minister also called for members of the EU to denounce the violent acts of the rebels.

=== United Nations and other bodies ===
On 25 May, UNOTIL opened a refugee camp outside Dili expected to house up to 1000 people. However, on 27 May as the violence escalated, the UN announced that they planned to withdraw the majority of their staff from the country.

The chief executive of World Vision Australia, Reverend Tim Costello, announced on 27 May that he would travel to Dili to assess the situation, to help displaced civilians. He also expressed concern over reports that one World Vision worker had been killed.

== Continuing violence ==
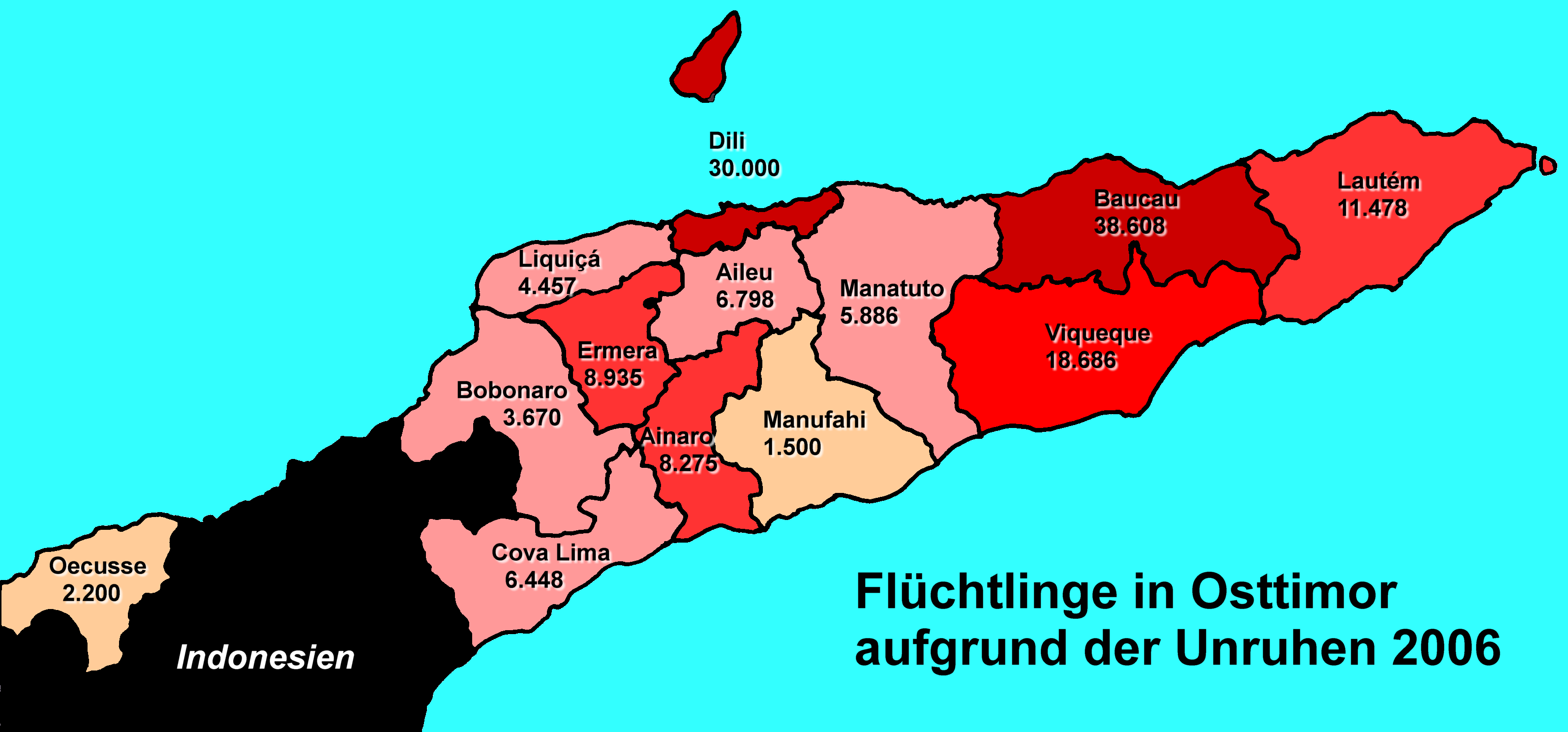
Number of internal displaced people by district

Despite hopes that the presence of international troops would quell the unrest, violence continued throughout Dili and other parts of Timor-Leste.

On 27 May, gangs from different parts of the country fought in the streets of Dili, destroying cars and houses and fighting with knives, machetes and slingshots leaving at least three East Timorese hacked to death. Dili residents continued to flee the city, with some seeking refuge at the Australian embassy and some going to the airport. A UN official expressed concerns that the regionally based conflict in the military was igniting wider regional conflict in the civilian population, saying "It's basically payback time between the different groups." A Catholic priest similarly described the street violence as "...east against west, soldiers against soldiers, police against soldiers, everyone against everyone... It's total madness."

The media were targeted for the first time when an AFP car, with two reporters and one photographer inside, also containing an AP photographer was attacked after one easterner forced his way into the vehicle and another jumped on the roof while attempting to escape a pursuing mob of westerners.

Australian troops were attacked as they endeavoured to keep the gangs apart, while they helped civilians escape to safety through back alleys. The Australians did not return fire, instead discouraging the gangs by advancing towards them and "shouting orders and threats". The rescued civilians were then rushed to the UN compound nearby. The Major commanding the troops said that the gangs were using mobile phones to co-ordinate their attacks, but that the attacks would likely cease as more international troops arrived and completely secured the city.

On 29 May, Brigadier Slater met with military and civilian leaders in Timor-Leste, and had secured the return of FDTL soldiers to their barracks. Australian Defence Minister Brendan Nelson also said that the Timor-Leste authorities should expand the rules of engagement of the international forces, to give them police powers to combat the gangs, saying that "It's clear there needs to be political leadership as far as the policing is concerned ... what we need is a policing strategy across Dili." Also on 29 May, Australian Prime Minister John Howard rejected criticisms that Australian troops had not secured Dili quickly enough, saying that the crisis was possibly more dangerous than the violence following independence from Indonesia in 1999, and that "We cannot have a situation around the world and particularly in our region where Australia is told to respect the independence of a country and that it's a bully boy if it seeks to express a view or to intervene, but when something goes wrong Australia is then criticised for not having, quote, intervened earlier."

=== Council of State meeting ===
Throughout 29 and 30 May, President Xanana Gusmão held crisis talks with the Council of State, an advisory body composed of community leaders. The Council, which has the ability to authorise the President to dismiss the National Parliament, was the first meeting between Gusmão and Prime Minister Alkatiri since the escalation of violence in the previous week. The meeting was also attended by Foreign Minister Ramos-Horta (leading to speculation that Ramos-Horta might be appointed as a temporary Prime Minister if Alkatiri were to be sacked), the Bishop of Dili, the UNOTIL representative Sukehiro Hasegawa and United Nations Secretary-General Kofi Annan's personal representative Ian Martin, who was previously the UN representative to East Timor in the leadup to the independence referendum in 1999. Gusmão emerged from the meeting in the afternoon of 29 May to urge crowds gathered outside, composed of supporters of Gusmão and Ramos-Horta and opponents of Alkatiri, to put down their weapons and return home, saying "If you trust me, west and east, embrace each other in your home, be calm and help each other to stay calm".

Late on 30 May, after the Council meeting and following an emergency meeting with his cabinet, Gusmão announced that he was declaring a state of emergency to last for 30 days, during which time Gusmão, as Commander-in-Chief, would have sole command of both the military and the police forces, and would personally co-ordinate with the international forces, and to combat the gang violence both internal and international forces would have increased policing powers. There had been some speculation that the Council would advise Gusmão to dissolve the Parliament and sack Prime Minister Alkatiri, however under the emergency arrangements Alkatiri would remain in office, albeit with reduced authority. Gusmão said that he was taking personal responsibility of both the military and police to "prevent violence and avoid further fatalities". Gusmão said that the decision to assume control was taken in "close collaboration" with Alkatiri, despite some members of the government, including Foreign Minister Ramos-Horta, attributing some of the blame for the crisis directly to Alkatiri.

On 1 June, Gusmão visited a refugee camp near the United Nations headquarters, telling people "The best thing you can do is go back to your homes", and urging them not to take security matters into their own hands. On the same day, Interior Minister Rogerio Lobato and Defence Minister Roque Rodrigues resigned, Lobato blaming the crisis on opponents to the government resorting to violence rather than political means. Foreign Minister Ramos-Horta subsequently took over the Defence ministry, while Malaysian Foreign Minister Syed Hamid Albar urged Ramos-Horta to act strongly in his new capacity, in the interests of achieving political stability, while emphasising that the United Nations should be prepared to resume greater role.

=== Civil unrest in Dili ===
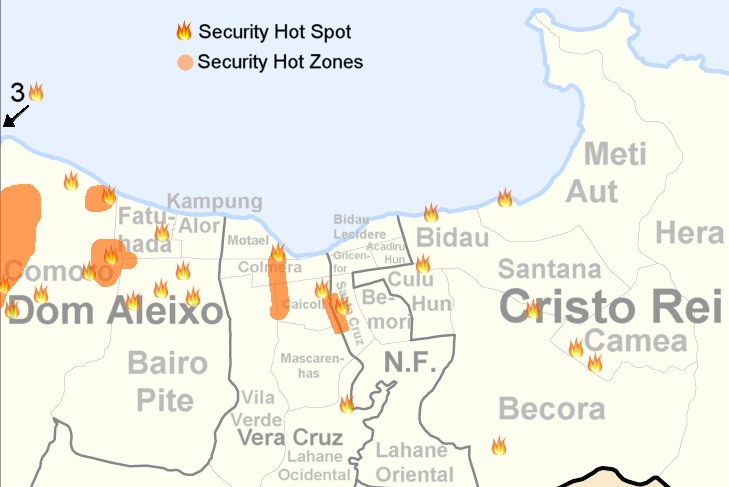
Security Hot Zones and Hot Spots in Dili, 24 October 2006

On the night of 31 May, gangs in the capital Dili burned down a market and several houses in arson attacks.

On 2 June, a large crowd of about 1000 people who had waited in vain for several hours for food handouts raided a government warehouse in Dili, taking computer equipment, furniture and other supplies to trade them for food. Australian soldiers present at the warehouse were unable to prevent the looting due to a lack of police powers, and although they summoned Portuguese police, the warehouse was practically empty. On the same day a crowd of 500 to 600 people protested outside Government House again calling for the resignation of Prime Minister Alkatiri. A group of Timor-Leste police who arrived to confront the demonstration were stopped and searched by Australian troops, who confiscated their only weapons, several cans of pepper spray, as part of a policy of removing all weapons from the streets.

Meanwhile, also on 2 June, the commander of the Australian forces Brigadier Slater met with rebel leader Major Reinado, at his base in Aileu above Dili. Reinado reiterated his calls for Prime Minister Alkatiri to resign, but Alkatiri rejected the calls, instead saying that all "irregular forces" ought to hand in their weapons. In interviews, Slater said that he did not ask Reinado to surrender or participate in negotiations because the situation was not ready for discussions, as not all groups were ready to participate. Slater said that some of the violence seemed coordinated, and that he had been co-operating with the military, the police, the government, and Reinado in an attempt to find those planning the violence.

On the night of 2 and 3 June, looting and gang violence destroyed another dozen houses in Dili, and forced the temporary closure of the main road between Dili and the airport to the west of the city, where the international forces were based, although Australian and Malaysian forces quickly secured the road.

Over the next few days, violence continued to occur in the suburb of Comoro, the area to the west of the city centre on the road to the airport (also known as Comoro Airfield) where many groups from both the east and the west of the country lived nearby. On 5 June, rival gangs, with over a hundred members each, clashed in the streets armed with spears, machetes and slingshots, before being separated by Australian troops. However at the same time in the centre of Dili, the unrest had all but ended, with commercial areas re-opening and some of the damaged buildings and shops being repaired.

=== Protests, allegations and investigations ===
On 6 June, a convoy of anti-Alkatiri protestors from the west of the country drove to Dili, through the western suburb of Comoro and to the National Parliament and government buildings in the heart of the city. The convoy consisted of at least thirty trucks, along with buses and motorbikes, and were accompanied by Malaysian and Australian forces in armoured personnel carriers and an Australian Army Black Hawk helicopter. However, there was little or no violence accompanying the convoy, aside from some stones thrown as the convoy passed through Comoro, indicative of the level of support for the protest, which one reporter described as "a very impressive show of people power". In a deal brokered by Foreign Minister Ramos-Horta to ensure a peaceful protest, the convoy consisting of up to 2,500 people gathered in Tibar outside the Malaysian checkpoint to the west of the airport, where they surrendered any weapons before proceeding through Dili.

The crowd chanted for the resignation of Prime Minister Alkatiri, while also expressing support for President Gusmão. Gusmão later addressed the crowd from atop a car outside his office, saying "Let me bring peace to East Timor and then we will resolve others matters." He was said to be in tears at times, and said "The priority now is to stop people burning, and guns shooting." The convoy completed a loop around the inner city, before peacefully dispersing again.

On 7 June, Alkatiri agreed to a United Nations investigation into allegations that he was responsible for several incidents in April and May which sparked the crisis. UNOTIL representative Sukehiro Hasegawa, having met separately with Alkatiri and rebel leaders including Tarak Palasinyar and Reinado, said that Alkatiri was "agreeable to the investigations to be carried out... He's very transparent. He insists that truth should be known, what happened." Meanwhile, Australian Defence Minister Brendan Nelson said that the Timor-Leste judicial system was beginning to deal successfully with the problem of violent street gangs, saying that "We are detaining people, we are bringing them before a magistrate, and if they are found guilty, then, they are further being detained."

On 8 June, claims emerged that former Interior Minister and Alkatiri ally Rogerio Lobato (who had resigned a week earlier), acting on Alkatiri's instructions, recruited and armed a civilian militia to "eliminate" opponents of Alkatiri. The group consisted of about thirty civilians, and were allegedly armed with "18 assault rifles, 6,000 round sic of ammunition, two vehicles and uniforms." The leader of the group, referred to as Commander Railos, said that they had instructions to kill all of the rebel soldiers, but after losing five of the group in armed combat in Dili came to "appreciate that the cost of arming civilians was bloodshed and deaths on all sides" and was prepared to surrender to President Gusmão. Alkatiri strenuously denied the claims, saying that his government had not armed any civilians. Foreign Minister Ramos-Horta also said that he found it "very hard to believe that our own Prime Minister would... arm civilians".

On 9 June, Lieutenant Gastão Salsinha, the original leader of the rebel soldiers, reiterated the claims of Commander Railos, saying that Lobato had distributed 200 rifles stolen from the police armoury to civilians. He also claimed that on 28 April, the same day as the clash between the military and rebel soldiers that sparked the crisis, soldiers loyal to Alkatiri had shot and killed 60 civilians, before burying them in a mass grave outside Dili. The United Nations announced on 12 June that they would hold an inquiry into the crisis, but that they would not investigate the allegations made against Lobato and Alkatiri.

Rebel soldier Major Tara (left) hands over his weapon to Lieutenant Colonel Mick Mumford at a ceremony in the city of Gleno on 5 July.

Meanwhile the violence in Dili appeared to be subsiding, despite sporadic outbreaks, as international peacekeepers continued to secure the city. By 16 June, rebel soldiers were ready to hand in their weapons, in exchange for protection from the international military forces, following more than a week of negotiations. At camps in Gleno and Maubisse, rebels including Alfredo Reinado surrendered weapons, including several M16 rifles, which were then sealed in a shipping container. Brigadier Slater expressed doubts that all weapons would be handed in, but said that the presence of international forces around the rebel bases "will enable them to confidently enter into negotiations with the president and other members of the government."

On 20 June, the Timor-Leste Prosecutor-General issued an arrest warrant for Rogerio Lobato for arming Commander Railos and other civilians. Although there was initially some speculation as to whether Lobato had fled the country, by 21 June he was under house arrest in Dili.

On 20 June, the United Nations Security Council issued Resolution 1690, extending UNOTIL's mandate until 20 August and expressing support for the existing international peacekeeping effort. A controversy ensued as to whether the military component of the next UN mission would be under UN or Australian command, and the Security Council, unable to reach agreement, extended the mission for an additional five days on 20 August. Five days later, the Council adopted Resolution 1704 creating the new United Nations Integrated Mission in Timor-Leste (UNMIT). Australia was allowed to retain command over the joint military task force, although the UN Secretary-General and Security Council will revisit this question by 25 October.

== Resolution ==
=== Change of leadership ===
On 22 June, President Gusmão delivered an ultimatum on a national television broadcast, saying that he would resign as President the following day if Prime Minister Alkatiri did not resign. He had earlier told Alkatiri that he had lost confidence in him, and in his broadcast said that "Fretilin has to choose, ask Mari Alkatiri to take responsibility for the major crisis, about the sacrifices of the state, the law and democracy." The announcement followed reports the preceding day originating from Alkatiri's office that Alkatiri had intended to step back from an active role as prime minister on the morning of 22 June. The reports indicated that a plan had been developed which would see Alkatiri remain officially as prime minister for another month, but that two deputies would be appointed, who would have in fact governed in his place.

After Gusmão's broadcast, several thousand of his supporters began protesting in Dili, imploring that he not resign, with two or three thousand assembled by the afternoon of 23 June. Gusmão did not in fact resign that day, and indeed announced to the protestors that he would fulfil his constitutional duties, apparently indicating that he would not resign. Alkatiri said that he would only resign if his party Fretilin wanted him to, and on 25 June, a meeting of Fretilin leaders confirmed Alkatiri's status as prime minister. In response, Foreign and Defence Minister José Ramos-Horta resigned from office "because the government is not functioning properly", according to his spokesperson.

The next day, 26 June up to eight more ministers threatened to resign, and Ramos-Horta was beginning a press conference discussing his resignation when he received a phone call; after answering it, he said to the media "Please, we cancel our press conference because it is irrelevant anyway now. You are invited to go to the residence of the Prime Minister. He wants to make an announcement." There, Alkatiri announced his resignation, saying:

Having deeply reflected on the present situation prevailing in the country, considering that above all interests are the interests of our nation, assuming my own share of responsibility for the crisis affecting our country, determined not to contribute to any deepening of the crisis, recognising that the people of Timor deserve to live in peace and tranquillity, believing that all militants and sympathisers of Fretilin will understand and support this position, I declare I am ready to resign from my position of Prime Minister of the government of RDTL, so as to avoid the resignation of His Excellency, the President of the Republic.

— Mari Alkatiri,

After the announcement, mobs in the streets of Dili began to celebrate rather than protest. Australian Prime Minister John Howard said he was pleased with the resignation, insofar as it was "part of the process of working out the difficulty, resolving the impasse".

On 27 June, Alkatiri was issue with a summons to appear in court to give evidence relating to the accusations that Rogerio Lobato armed a group of civilians, prosecutors suggesting that Alkatiri may also be charged over allegations about his role in the matter.

Following Alkatiri's resignation, Ramos-Horta withdrew his resignation to contest the prime ministership, and was appointed prime minister on 8 July 2006 by President Gusmão.

== Consequences ==
The crisis has affected the political landscape of Timor-Leste. On 11 May 2006, Foreign Minister José Ramos-Horta suggested that Fernando Lasama, the leader of the Democratic Party, had encouraged the unrest. He also warned other parties not to exploit the violence and unrest for electoral gain, calling "on all parties to know that those who want to spread disunity, scare or threaten the people will not be chosen by the people in the 2007 elections."

By August 2006, troops had withdrawn from some points of the country and the rebels' leader, Alfredo Reinado, was able to escape from Becora Prison, in Dili.

On 2 October 2006, the United Nations Independent Special Commission of Inquiry made a number of recommendations including that several individuals be prosecuted. Notably, it found that Interior Minister Rogerio Lobato, and Defence Minister Roque Rodrigues and Defence Force Chief Taur Matan Ruak acted illegally in transferring weapons to civilians during the crisis.

== Documentary films ==
- Breaking the News (2011) 53 mins, is about local and foreign journalists covering the crisis. The filming completed in 2010 and the documentary post-production was completed in 2011.

== See also ==
- 1999 East Timorese crisis
