= MV Zhenhua 4 =

Chinese fishing ship attacked by Somali pirates

Zhenhua 4 (Chinese: 振华4号) is a Chinese fishing ship owned by China Communications Construction, which was attacked by Somali pirates on December 17, 2008.

== Attack by Pirates ==
The ship was on its way back to Shanghai when it was attacked by Somali Pirates in the Horn of Africa. The pirates, armed with rocket launchers and heavy machine guns, boarded the ship and attempted to seize control when the crew of 30 fought back using water cannons, Molotov cocktails and beer bottles. After responding to the crew's radio for help, a Malaysian warship, Sri Indera Sakti and Malaysian military helicopter arrived and fired on the pirates, who fled the scene. No crew members were injured.
