= United Nations Security Council Resolution 1677 =

UN Security Council Resolution 1677
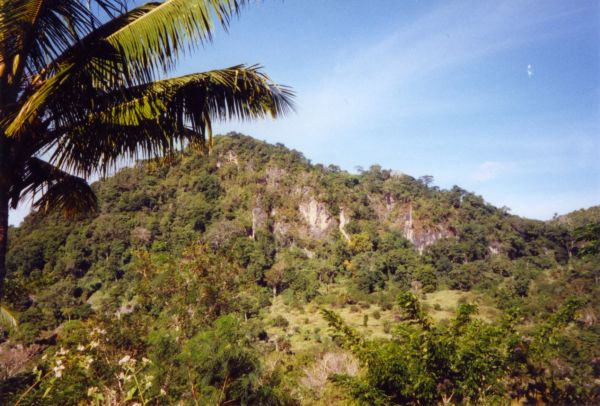
- Mountain in East Timor
- Date: 12 May 2006
- Meeting no.: 5,436
- Code: S/RES/1677 (Document)
- Subject: The situation in East Timor
- Voting summary: 15 voted for; None voted against; None abstained
- Result: Adopted

Security Council composition
- Permanent members: China; France; Russia; United Kingdom; United States
- Non-permanent members: Argentina; Rep. of the Congo; Denmark; Ghana; Greece; Japan; Peru; Qatar; Slovakia; Tanzania

United Nations Security Council Resolution 1677, adopted unanimously on May 12, 2006, after reaffirming previous resolutions on East Timor (Timor-Leste), particularly Resolution 1599 (2005), the Council renewed the mandate of the United Nations Office in Timor-Leste (UNOTIL) until June 20, 2006.

The resolution was adopted after unrest in which five people were killed in mob violence after a large portion of the national army was dismissed.

== Details ==
The Security Council expressed concern over incidents that occurred on April 28 and 29, 2006 and the ensuing situation, while acknowledging the role of the Timorese government to investigate the incidents. Extending UNOTIL's mandate, the Council requested the Secretary-General Kofi Annan to provide an update on the situation and the role of the peacekeeping operation with a view to taking further action.

Finally, the resolution encouraged the Timorese government and institutions to address the causes of the recent violence with assistance from UNOTIL.

== See also ==
- 2006 East Timorese crisis
- East Timor Special Autonomy Referendum
- List of United Nations Security Council Resolutions 1601 to 1700 (2005–2006)
- Operation Astute
