= United Nations Security Council Resolution 1599 =

UN Security Council Resolution 1599
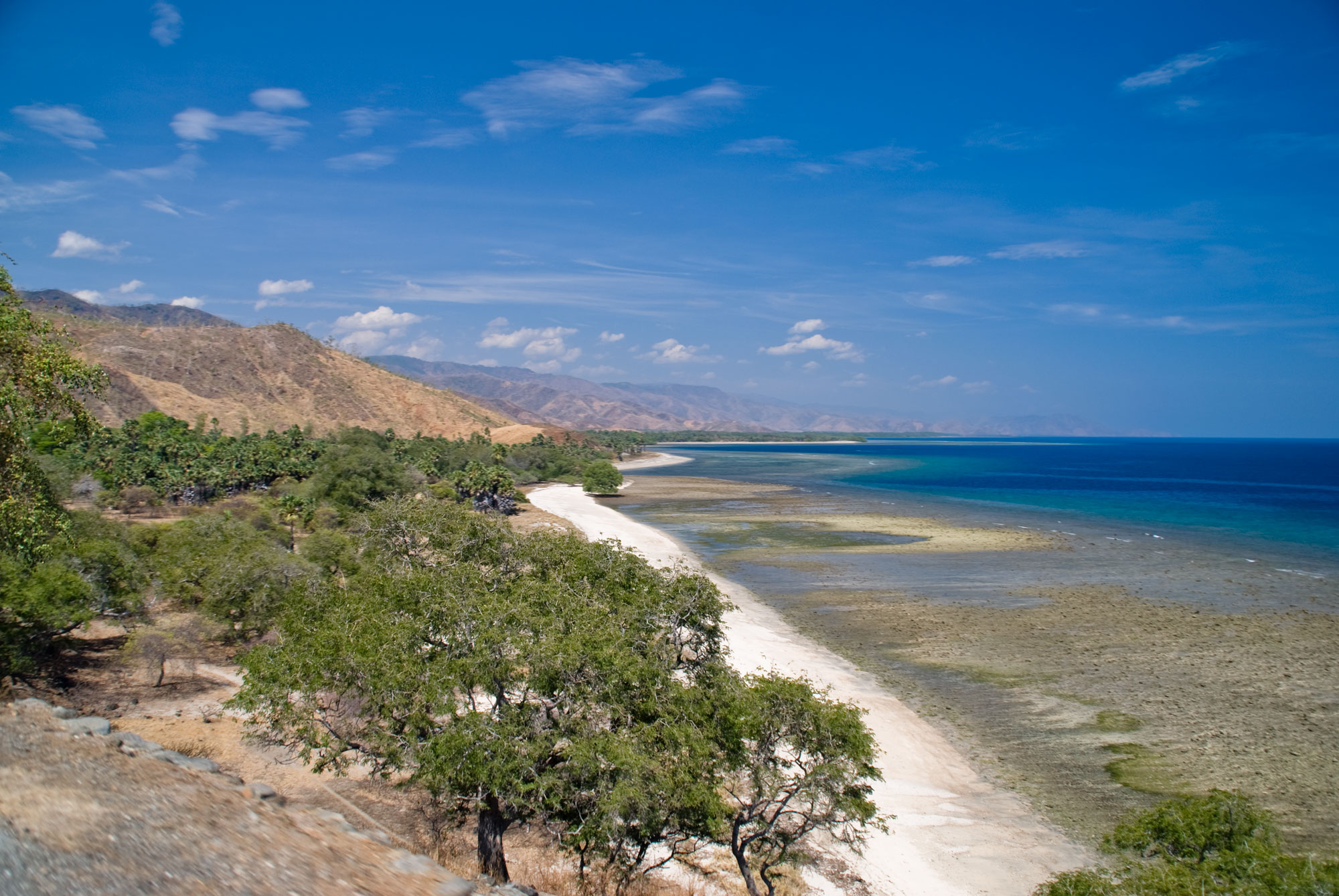
- Coastline of East Timor
- Date: 28 April 2005
- Meeting no.: 5,171
- Code: S/RES/1599 (Document)
- Subject: The situation in East Timor
- Voting summary: 15 voted for; None voted against; None abstained
- Result: Adopted

Security Council composition
- Permanent members: China; France; Russia; United Kingdom; United States
- Non-permanent members: Algeria; Argentina; Benin; Brazil; Denmark; Greece; Japan; Philippines; Romania; Tanzania

United Nations Security Council resolution 1599, adopted unanimously on 28 April 2005, after reaffirming previous resolutions on East Timor (Timor-Leste), particularly resolutions 1543 (2004) and 1573 (2004), the council established the United Nations Office in Timor-Leste (UNOTIL) to follow on from the United Nations Mission of Support to East Timor (UNMISET) as a special political mission for one year until 20 May 2006.

The resolution authorised a peacebuilding, rather than peacekeeping mandate for UNOTIL.

== Resolution ==
=== Observations ===
In the preamble of the resolution, the council commended the people and government for the peace and stability achieved in East Timor. UNMISET was also praised for its work in the country. The council noted the Secretary-General Kofi Annan's recommendation that the United Nations should remain in East Timor at a reduced level, and that institutions were in the process of consolidation.

=== Acts ===
The resolution established UNOTIL for one year to support the development of state institutions and police, and training regarding democratic governance and human rights through the provision of relevant officers. UNOTIL was to be headed by a Special Representative of the Secretary-General and place emphasis on the transfer of skills and knowledge to deliver better services and build the capacity of institutions.

Meanwhile, the council urged United Nations agencies, donors and financial institutions to continue to contribute towards the development of East Timor and emphasised the need for accountability for serious human rights violations committed in 1999.

== See also ==
- 1999 East Timorese crisis
- East Timor Special Autonomy Referendum
- Indonesian occupation of East Timor
- List of United Nations Security Council Resolutions 1501 to 1600 (2003–2005)
- United Nations Transitional Administration in East Timor
