= United Nations Integrated Mission in East Timor =

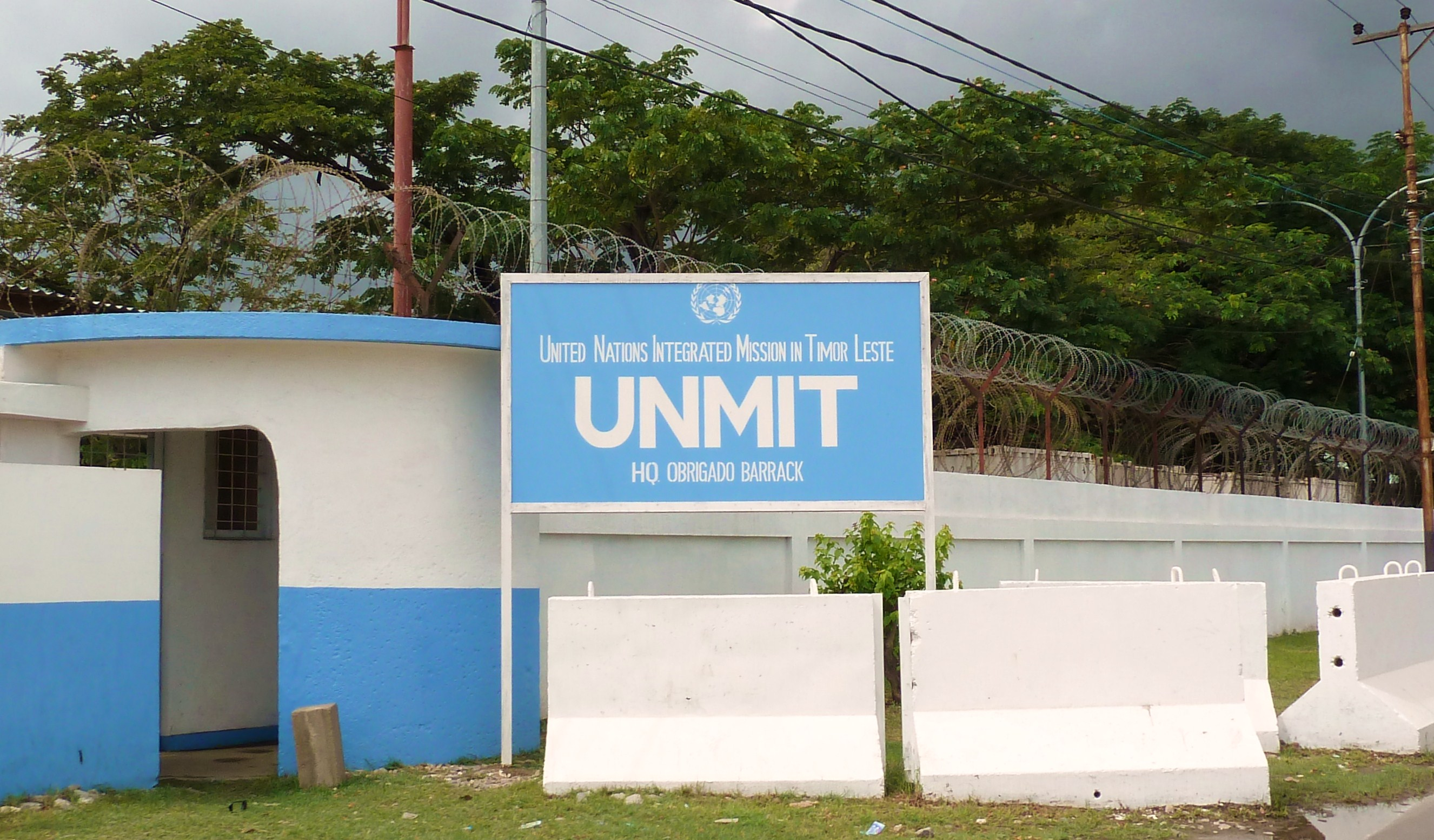
- UNMIT-HQ in Dili
- Abbreviation: UNMIT
- Formation: 25 August 2006
- Type: Peacekeeping Mission
- Legal status: Completed, 31 December 2012
- Head: Ameerah Haq
- Parent organization: United Nations Security Council
- Website: www.un.org/Depts/unmit

The United Nations Integrated Mission in East Timor (UNMIT) was established on 25 August 2006 by UN Security Council Resolution 1704. Its objectives are "to support the Government in consolidating stability, enhancing a culture of democratic governance, and facilitating political dialogue among Timorese stakeholders, in their efforts to bring about a process of national reconciliation and to foster social cohesion". In its most recent resolution on UNMIT, the Council extended its mandate until 26 February 2012. UNMIT and ISF troops left the country at the end of 2012.

== Past missions ==
The United Nations Mission in East Timor (UNAMET) (June—October 1999) was mandated to organise and conduct a popular consultation to ascertain whether the East Timorese people accepted a special autonomy within Indonesia or rejected the proposed special autonomy, leading to East Timor's separation from Indonesia . UNAMET was a political mission.

The United Nations Transitional Administration in East Timor (UNTAET) (October 1999 – May 2002) was a peacekeeping operation. The Security Council established UNTAET following rejection by the East Timorese of special autonomy. UNTAET exercised administrative authority over East Timor during the transition to independence.

The United Nations Mission of Support in East Timor (UNMISET) (May 2002 – May 2005), also a peacekeeping mission, was mandated to provide assistance to the newly independent East Timor until all operational responsibilities were fully devolved to the East Timor authorities, and to permit the new nation, now called Timor-Leste, to attain self-sufficiency.

Once the peacekeeping mission withdrew, a new political mission, the United Nations Office in East Timor (UNOTIL) (May 2005 – August 2006), supported the development of critical State institutions and the police and provided training in observance of democratic governance and human rights.

== Background ==
UNOTIL was scheduled to end its mandate in May 2006, and the Security Council had already received the UN Secretary-General's recommendations for the post-UNOTIL period. However, a series of events culminating in a political, humanitarian and security crisis of major dimensions led the Council to prolong UNOTIL's mandate, ultimately to 20 August 2006, and to request new recommendations taking into account the need for a strengthened United Nations presence. Against this background, East Timor urgently requested police and military assistance from Australia, New Zealand, Malaysia, and Portugal. On 26 May, incoming international forces began securing key installations in the country.

== Request for a new mission ==
On 11 June 2006, the President of East Timor, the President of the National Parliament and the Prime Minister wrote to the Secretary-General requesting that he propose to the Security Council to establish a United Nations police force in East Timor to maintain law and order until the national police could undergo reorganisation and restructuring. The Secretary-General requested his Special Envoy, appointed on 25 May 2006, to lead a multidisciplinary assessment mission to East Timor to identify the scope of tasks to be undertaken by a post-UNOTIL mission and to develop recommendations for a future UN presence. The mission conducted its assessment from 26 June to 9 July.

== Secretary-General's recommendations ==
The Secretary-General recommended the establishment of a United Nations multidimensional, integrated mission, with the mandate to support the Government of East Timor and to assist it in its efforts to bring about a process of national reconciliation; to support the country in all aspects of the 2007 presidential and parliamentary electoral process; to ensure, through the presence of United Nations police with an executive policing mandate, the restoration and maintenance of public security; to assist in liaising with the Indonesian military through the impartial presence of United Nations Military Liaison Officers; and to assist in further strengthening the national capacity for the monitoring, promotion and protection of human rights.

The mandate would also include provisions to assist the Prosecutor-General in resuming the investigative functions of the former Serious Crimes Unit; mainstream gender perspectives and those of children and youth; and ensure the security and freedom of movement of United Nations and associated personnel. The Secretary-General recommends that the mission be established for an initial period of 12 months, until after the implementation of the 2007 election results.

To fulfil the mandate of the mission, a strong civilian component would be required. The component would include a United Nations civilian police element of substantially greater strength than that in UNOTIL, with the support of a small United Nations military component. The mission would operate under the leadership of the Secretary-General's Special Representative. The Special Representative would have overall authority over other United Nations activities in East Timor in support of the mission's mandate, and would provide leadership, political guidance and support to the United Nations system in this regard. The Special Representative would be assisted by a senior management team, comprising among others, a police commissioner and a force commander.

The Special Representative would be supported by a political affairs unit, a planning and best practices unit, a legal affairs unit, a conduct and discipline unit, a public information and outreach unit, a joint operations centre, a joint mission analysis centre, a resident auditor's unit and a senior gender adviser.

== Establishment of UNMIT ==
Welcoming the report of the Secretary-General and, among other things expressing its appreciation and support for the deployment of the international security forces, the Security Council, by its resolution 1704 (2006) of 25 August 2006, decided to establish the United Nations Integrated Mission in East Timor (UNMIT) for an initial period of six months, with the intention to renew for further periods. The Council also decided that UNMIT would consist of an appropriate civilian component, including up to 1,608 police personnel, and an initial component of up to 34 military liaison and staff officers. The Council requested the Secretary-General to review the arrangements to be established between UNMIT and the international security forces and affirmed that it would consider possible adjustments in the mission structure taking into account the views of the Secretary-General.

The Security Council mandated UNMIT to, among other things, support the Government and relevant institutions with a view to consolidating stability, enhancing a culture of democratic governance and facilitating political dialogue; and to support East Timor in all aspects of the 2007 presidential and parliamentary electoral process. UNMIT would also provide support to the national police, assist in conducting a comprehensive review of the role and needs of the security sector and co-operate and co-ordinate with United Nations agencies, funds and programmes and all relevant partners in view of making maximum use of assistance in post conflict peace-building and capacity building. For complete details of the mandate, see Mandate section.

== UNPOL deployment ==
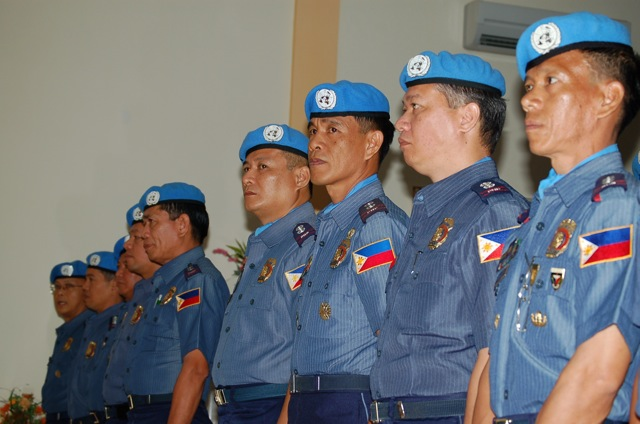
Filipino police officers serving with UNMIT in 2007

Algeria, Australia, Bangladesh, Brazil, Canada, Croatia, Egypt, El Salvador, Gabon, Gambia, India, Japan, Jordan, Kyrgyzstan, Malaysia, Namibia, Nepal, New Zealand, Nigeria, Oman, Pakistan, Philippines, Portugal, Republic of Korea, Romania, Russian Federation, Samoa, Senegal, Singapore, Spain, Sri Lanka, Sweden, Thailand, Turkey, Uganda, Ukraine, United States, Uruguay, Vanuatu, Yemen, Zambia, and Zimbabwe.

== Other staff and military ==
Australia, Bangladesh, Brazil, China, Fiji, Japan, India, Malaysia, Nepal, New Zealand, Pakistan, Philippines, Portugal, Sierra Leone, and Singapore.

== Peacekeepers and prostitution ==
Men in the peacekeeping force of the United Nations Integrated Mission in East Timor, which assisted police and took part in prostitution raids, were accused of taking part in prostitution. It was alleged they frequented brothels, including those using trafficked women. UN vehicles were used to pick up street prostitutes. There were also allegations that a ship chartered by the UN was being used to traffic children for prostitution in the country.

== See also ==
- Foreign Aid to Timor Leste
