= United Nations Office in Timor-Leste =

- Abbreviation: UNOTIL
- Formation: 20 May 2005
- Type: Political Mission
- Legal status: Completed
- Head: Sukehiro Hasegawa
- Parent organization: United Nations Security Council

The United Nations Office in Timor-Leste (UNOTIL) supported the capacity development of critical state institutions, including the Timor-Leste National Police (PNTL) in order to strengthen democratic governance and to help further build to peace in Timor-Leste. A UN Police Force of Technical Advisers continues to provide the country's police, Policia Nacional de Timor-Leste (PNTL), with specialized training for rapid response and intervention units. The Technical Advisers are also responsible for providing training in specialized areas such as counter-terrorism, forensics, and transferring management skills to the national police in all districts of Timor-Leste.

Following up on UNMISET, the Security Council passed Resolution 1599 authorising peace-building activities by establishing the United Nations Office in Timor Leste (UNOTIL). UNOTIL commenced on 20 May 2005 and was mandated for one year until 19 May 2006. United Nations Security Council Resolution 1677 extended UNOTIL's mandate one month past expiration while forces from former INTERFET countries came to provide peacekeeping, the main force coming from Australia under Operation Astute. The mandate of UNOTIL was then again extended until 25 August 2006.
