= Australia and the United Nations =

Commonwealth of Australia

United Nations membership
- Represented by: Commonwealth of Australia (1945-present)
- Membership: Full member
- Since: 1 November 1945
- UNSC seat: Non-permanent
- Permanent Representative: James Larsen

Australia was one of the founding members of the United Nations (UN) in 1945 and has been actively engaged in the organisation since its formation. The UN is seen by the Australian Government as a means to influence events which directly affect Australia's interests but over which they have little unilateral control.

== Diplomatic representation ==
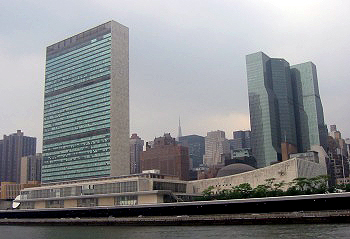
UN headquarters in New York City

Australia has a permanent diplomatic mission to the UN in New York City along with missions in Geneva, Vienna and Nairobi. The Australian Mission is headed by an Ambassador and Permanent Representative and staffed by officers from the Department of Foreign Affairs, AusAid, the Australian Defence Force, the Australian Federal Police, as well as local employees. The Mission provides the core of Australia's delegation to UN conferences and meetings in New York, including regular and special sessions of the United Nations General Assembly. It also participates in the ongoing work of the UN's other organisations, such as the Security Council and the Economic and Social Council, and follows the activities of the UN's specialised agencies and programs.

Australia is the twelfth largest financial contributor to the UN. Australia contributed more than US$87 million in the years 2004 to 2006, with a regular budget of US$22.9 million, peacekeeping costs of approximately US$60 million, and over US$4 million contribution to International Tribunals.

Australia has been an elected member of the United Nations Security Council on five occasions in the past. H. V. Evatt, a former Opposition Leader of Australia and prominent figure in the Australian Labor Party, was President of the United Nations General Assembly in 1948.

=== UN service ===
UN Organisation	Terms served
UNSC	1946–1947, 1956–1957, 1973–1974, 1985–1986, 2013–2014
ECOSOC	1992–1997, 2002–2012, 2016–date
UNHRC	1991–1997, 2003–2006, 2018–2020

== Australian involvement in UN peacekeeping operations ==
Australians were the first peacekeepers to serve under United Nations auspices when they sent military observers to Indonesia in 1947 during the independence struggle. About 65,000 Australian personnel have partaken in more than fifty peacekeeping operations, in about 25 different conflicts. Operations include military observation, monitoring cease-fires, clearing landmines, humanitarian aid and the repatriation of refugees.

Since 1947 Australians have joined peacekeeping operations in Cambodia, Korea, Namibia, Rwanda, and Somalia among others. All three services of the Australian Defence Force, as well as police officers and civilians, have been involved in peacekeeping activities.

The most significant recent involvement from Australian peacekeeping troops is in the newly formed country of East Timor. Australia initially offered between 1,000 and 1,300 infantry, three Royal Australian Navy ships (HMAS Manoora and HMAS Kanimbla already stationed nearby, and HMAS Tobruk) along with other support capabilities. Australia's involvement in East Timor is through UNMISET, the United Nations Mission of Support to East Timor, and UNOTIL, the United Nations Office in Timor Leste and UNMIT, the United Nations Integrated Mission in Timor-Leste.

Australia also has peacekeepers from the Australian Defence Force participating in the United Nations Mission in Sudan, to support the African Union's Mission in Darfur.

Seven Australians have commanded or led multinational peacekeeping operations. Nine Australian peacekeepers have died on UN missions.

UN Operation name	UN Operation title	Location	Dates of Australian involvement	Number of Australians involved	Australian role
None	UN Consular Commission	Indonesia	1947	4	Military observers
UNGOC	UN Good Offices Commission	Indonesia	1947–1949	About 45 ADF personnel	Monitor ceasefires and ensure the peace between Dutch and Indonesian nationalists
UNCI	UN Commission for Indonesia	Indonesia	1949–1951	About 45 ADF personnel	Monitor ceasefires and ensure the peace between Dutch and Indonesian nationalists
UNCOK	UN Commission on Korea	Korea	1950	2	Military observers
UNMOGIP	UN Military Observer Group in India and Pakistan	Kashmir	1950–1985	Up to 18	Military observers and air transport
UNCURK	UN Commission for the Unification and Rehabilitation of Korea	Korea	1951	1	Military observer
UNCMAC	UN Command Military Armistice Commission	Korea	1953–present	Originally 6, with 2 continually serving. Estimated 68 total	Armistice monitoring
UNTSO	UN Truce Supervision Organization	Israel and neighbouring Middle East countries	1956–present	Up to 13. Estimated 700 total	Military observers
ONUC	Operation des Nations Unies au Congo (UN Operation in the Congo)	Congo	1960–1961	Army medical team of 3 seconded to the International Red Cross	Medical team
UNTEA	UN Temporary Executive Authority	Western New Guinea	1962–1963	4 Army pilots, 7 RAAF ground crew and 2 Sioux helicopters	Cholera eradication program
UNYOM	UN Yemen Observation Mission	Yemen	1963	2	Military observers
UNFICYP	UN Peacekeeping Force in Cyprus	Cyprus	1964–present	15 Australian Federal Police officers. Estimated 1000 in total	Law and order
UNIPOM	UN India-Pakistan Observation Mission	India and Pakistan	1965–1966	3; 1 seconded from UNTSO, 2 seconded from UNMOGIP	Military observers
UNDOF	UN Disengagement Observer Force	Israel and Syria	1974	Several redeployed from UNTSO. None currently	Military observers
UNEF II	UN Emergency Force II	Sinai	1976–1979	46 RAAF detachment operating 4 UH-1 helicopters	Ceasefire monitoring between Israel and Egypt
UNIFIL	UN Interim Force in Lebanon	Lebanon	1978	A few through detachment from UNTSO	Military observers
UNIIMOG	UN Iran-Iraq Military Observer Group	Iran and Iraq	1988–1990	Up to 16 in Iran only	Military observers
UNBRO	UN Border Relief Operation	Thailand/Cambodia border	1989–1993	2 Federal Police	Law and order, and police training
UNTAG	UN Transition Assistance Group	Namibia	1989–1990	613 in two rotations; 28 electoral supervisors	Engineering support and election supervision
UNMCTT	UN Mine Clearance Training Team	Afghanistan and Pakistan	1989–1993	10 teams of 6–9 Army field engineers. Estimated 95 total	Demining
UNSCOM	UN Special Commission	Iraq	1991–1999	Between 2–6 ADF personnel on 3–6-month tours, 1 RAAF Image Analyst on rotation for up to 3 years. Estimated total 96	Inspection of Iraqi chemical, biological and nuclear weapons capabilities
MINURSO	Mission des Nations Unies pour un Referendum au Sahara Occidental (UN Mission for the Referendum in Western Sahara)	Western Sahara	1991–1994	5 45 person contingents. Total 225	Communications
UNAMIC	UN Advance Mission in Cambodia	Cambodia	1991–1992	65	Military observers, signals and support
UNTAC	UN Transitional Authority in Cambodia	Cambodia	1992–1993	Up to 1,215 ADF personnel	Movement Control Group (May - Sep 1992); Force Communications Unit
UNOSOM I	UN Operation in Somalia	Somalia	1992–1993	30	Movement control unit
UNITAF	Unified Task Force	Somalia	1992–1993	About 1,200. 1 Royal Australian Regiment Battalion Group, HQ group, and HMAS Tobruk	Protecting delivery of humanitarian aid, law and order, and establishing functional legal, social and economic systems
UNPROFOR	UN Protection Force in Croatia, Bosnia-Herzegovina and Macedonia	Former Yugoslavia	1992	Several	Military observers and liaison
UNOSOM II	UN Operation in Somalia II	Somalia	1993–1995	36 Movements and Air Traffic Control Staff, 12-man Ready Reaction Security Team (mainly SAS) and HQ staff. 50 personnel per tour, about 250 in total	Movement control unit, HQ staff, security
UNAMIR II	UN Assistance Mission for Rwanda	Rwanda	1994–1995	More than 600 in 2 contingents	Medical, infantry protection, support troops
ONUMOZ	UN Operation in Mozambique	Mozambique	1994	15 police, 4 ADF	Police and demining
MINUGUA	UN Verification Mission in Guatemala	Guatemala	1997	1	Military observer
UNAMET	UN Mission in East Timor	East Timor	1999	50 police, 6 military liaison officers	Facilitating referendum
INTERFET	International Force East Timor under UN mandate	East Timor	1999–2000	5,500	Establishing security, facilitating humanitarian aid and reconstruction
UNTAET	UN Transitional Administration in East Timor	East Timor	2000–2002	Up to 2,000	maintaining security, facilitating reconstruction
UNMEE	United Nations Mission in Ethiopia and Eritrea	Ethiopia and Eritrea	2000–present	2 ADF officers, 16 in total	Training mission personnel and mapping
UNMISET	UN Mission of Support in East Timor	East Timor	2002–2005	Up to 1,600	Maintaining security, facilitating reconstruction
UNMOVIC	UN Monitoring, Verification and Inspection Commission for Iraq	Iraq	2002–2003	A few trained, two Royal Australian Air Force Armourers deployed to Iraq with one FSGT Michael Avenell taking up a role with UNMOVIC in the UNHQ New York until its disbandment	Weapons inspectors
UNAMA	UN Assistance Mission in Afghanistan	Afghanistan	2003–2004	1	Military advisor
UNMIS (Operation Azure)	United Nations Mission in the Sudan	Sudan	2005–present	15	Military observers, logistics, air movement controllers
UNOTIL (Operation Tower)	United Nations Office in Timor-Leste	East Timor	2005–present	About 17	Military and police support

== Australia-UN relations in 2008 ==
In March 2008, senior United Nations officials travelled to Canberra to meet Prime Minister Kevin Rudd, elected three months earlier. According to The Age, the aim was to "repair relations". Hilde Johnson, deputy director of UNICEF, stated that Rudd was showing "stronger support" for the United Nations and multilateralism than his predecessor John Howard had. During Howard's Prime Ministership, UN high commissioner for human rights Mary Robinson had criticised Australia's human rights record. Johnson stated that the new Australian government had "explicitly said there's going to be a change, that the government will engage strongly and pro-actively with the UN". For the Australian government, Bob McMullan said that his country's "relationship with the major multi-lateral organisations has deteriorated in a manner that is quite contrary to Australia's long-term interests and needs to be repaired".

== Australian Contributions to UN Regular Budget as at 2016 ==
Scale of assessments adopted in UN resolution 67/238	Contributions (USD)	Scale of assessments for 2016	Gross contributions (USD)	Credit from staff assessment	Net contributions (USD)	Total contributions (USD)
2.074	$933,300	2.337	$63,103,396	$5,890,149	$57,213,247	$58,146,547

== See also ==
- 2006 East Timor crisis
- International Force for East Timor (INTERFET)
