= List of military operations involving Australia =

This is an incomplete list of Australian military operations.

Operation	Non- combat	From	To	Area of Operation	Purpose	Notes
Operation Southern Indian Ocean	N	2014			Search for MH370	
Operation Okra		2014		Iraq and later Syria		
Operation Pacific Assist 2015	N	2015		Vanuatu		
Operation Hawick		2014		The Hague and Ukraine		
Operation Accordion		1 July 2014		Middle East		
Operation Manitou		1 July 2014		Middle East – Maritime		
Operation Philippines Assist	N	2013		Philippines		
Operation Dirk		1 September 1997	31 October 1997		"Border Protection"	
Operation Gemsbok		29 August 2003	3 October 2003		"Border Protection"	
Operation Mistral (Border protection)		1 August 1998	30 June 2006		"Border Protection"	
Operation Stanhope		3 February 1998	6 March 1998		"Border Protection"	
Operation Teebone		1 March 2001	31 March 2001		"Border Protection"	
Operation Sutton (Border protection)		25 January 2002	19 February 2002		"Border Protection"	
Operation Faber		19 June 1999	15 September 1999	East Timor	UNAMET	
Operation Concord		16 June 1999	24 September 1999	East Timor	UNAMET / INTERFET	
Operation Warden		16 September 1999	10 April 2000	East Timor	INTERFET	
Operation Gateway		1 February 1981	current operation	Indian Ocean and South East Asia	Maritime Surveillance	
Operation Stabilise		16 September 1999	23 February 2000	East Timor	INTERFET	
Operation Tanager		20 February 2000	19 May 2002	East Timor	UNTAET	
Operation Citadel (East Timor)		20 May 2002	17 August 2003	East Timor	UNMISET	
Operation Slipper		11 October 2001	5 December 2002	Afghanistan	ICAT	
Operation Slipper		1 January 2009	31 December 2014	Afghanistan	ICAT	
Operation Palate		18 April 2003	4 July 2004	Afghanistan	UNAMA	
Operation Palate II		27 June 2005	current operation	Afghanistan	UNAMA	
Operation Jural		30 June 1991	12 January 2003	Iraq		
Operation Provide Comfort	N	11 August 1991	15 December 1996	Iraq		
Operation Bolton		31 August 1992	12 January 2003	Iraq		
Operation Southern Watch		31 August 1992	12 January 2003	Iraq		
Operation Northern Watch		1 January 1997	12 January 2003	Iraq		
Operation Falconer		18 March 2003	22 July 2003	Iraq		
Operation Catalyst		16 July 2003	31 July 2009	Iraq		
Operation Riverbank		21 July 2008	25 November 2013	Iraq	UNAMI	
Operation Kruger		1 January 2009	31 July 2011	Iraq		
Operation Damask	N	13 January 1993	19 January 1993	Kuwait		
Operation Tamar		25 July 1994	8 March 1996	Rwanda		
Operation Husky (Sierra Leone)		15 January 2001	28 February 2003	Sierra Leone		
Operation Solace	N	10 January 1993	21 May 1993	Somalia	UNOSOM I	
Operation Solace	N	1 May 1993	28 March 1995	Somalia	UNOSOM II	
Operation Crown		25 June 1965	31 August 1968	Thailand		
Operation Gold (Australia)	N			Sydney	2000 Olympics	
Operation Helpem Fren	N	2003		Solomon Islands	RAMSI	
Operation Anode	N	2003		Solomon Islands	RAMSI	
Operation Morris Dance	N	May 1987	May 1987	Fiji		
Operation Sumatra Assist	N	2004		Indonesia	Disaster relief	
Operation Astute	N	25 May 2006		East Timor		
Operation Vic Fire Assist	N	February 2009	14 March 2009	Victoria	The relief effort following the Black Saturday bushfires	
Operation Mazurka	N	1981		Sinai Peninsula	MFO	
Operation Paladin	N	1956		Jerusalem	UNTSO	
Operation Resolute	N	17 July 2006	ongoing		"Border Protection"	
Operation Relex	N	3 September 2001	13 March 2006		"Border Protection"	
Operation Tower	N	25 August 2006	31 December 2012	East Timor	UNMIT	
Operation Aslan		23 September 2011		South Sudan	UNMISS	
Operation Azure	N	24 March 2005	2011	Sudan	UNMIS	
Operation Hedgerow	N		2011	Sudan		
Operation Yasi Assist	N	2 February 2011	14 February 2011	FNQ	Cyclone relief	
Operation Queensland Flood Assist	N		2011	Queensland		
Operation Christchurch Assist	N		2011	Christchurch		
Operation Pacific Assist	N		2011			
Operation Haiti Assist	N		2010	Haiti		
Operation Pakistan Assist II	N		2010	Pakistan		
Operation Samoa Assist	N		2009			
Operation Outreach	N		2009			
Operation Padang Assist	N		2009	Indonesia		
Operation Testament	N		2008	Sydney	World Youth Day 08 (WYD08)	
Operation Kiribati Assist	N		2008			
Operation PNG Assist	N		2008			
Operation Deluge			2007	Sydney	APEC 2007	
Operation Acolyte	N		2006	Melbourne	2006 Commonwealth Games	
Operation Ramp	N		2006	Lebanon	Lebanon evacuation	
Operation Pakistan Assist	N		2006			
Operation Relex II	N	14 March 2002	16 July 2006	North-West Australia	Coastwatch	
Operation Celesta		1 August 2001	31 July 2006		Coastwatch	
Operation Cranberry		1 August 1997	16 July 2006	Northern Australia	Northern Coastwatch	
Operation Sumatra Assist	N		2005	Indonesia		
Operation Bel Isi	N	20 November 1997	26 August 2003	Bougainville		
Operation Osier		25 January 1997		Balkans		
Operation Spitfire		6 September 1999	19 September 1999	East Timor	Evacuation	
Operation Spire		20 May 2004	11 May 2006	East Timor		
Operation Chiron		20 May 2005	11 May 2006	East Timor	UNOTIL	
Operation Pomelo		15 January 2001		Ethiopia and Eritrea	UNMEE	
Operation Habitat	N	1 May 1991	30 June 1991	Iraq		
Operation Blazer		1 May 1991	30 June 1998	Iraq	UNSCOM	
Operation Pollard		15 February 1998	30 June 1998	Iraq		
Operation Cendarawasih		1976	1981	Irian Jaya	Survey Operations	
Operation Coracle		12 July 1994	31 March 2002	Mozambique		
Operation Trek		4 November 2000	15 March 2002	Solomon Islands		
Operation Gading		6 May 1975	22 August 1975	Indonesia		
Operation Quickstep	N	31 October 2006	22 December 2006	Fiji		
Operation Claret		July 1964	July 1966	Borneo		
Operation Anaconda		2 March 2002	16 March 2002	Afghanistan		
Operation Perth		July 2006		Afghanistan		
Operation Eagle's Summit		27 August 2008	5 September 2008	Afghanistan		
Operation Jacana		April 2002	July 2002	Afghanistan		
Operation Mountain Thrust		15 May 2006	31 July 2006	Afghanistan		
Operation Blowdown	N	18 July 1963		Queensland, Australia	Blast effect test on rainforest	
Operation Navy Help Darwin	N	31 December 1974	31 January 1975	Darwin	Assistance in the wake of Cyclone Tracy	

== See also ==
- Current Australian Defence Force deployments
