= Australian military involvement in peacekeeping =

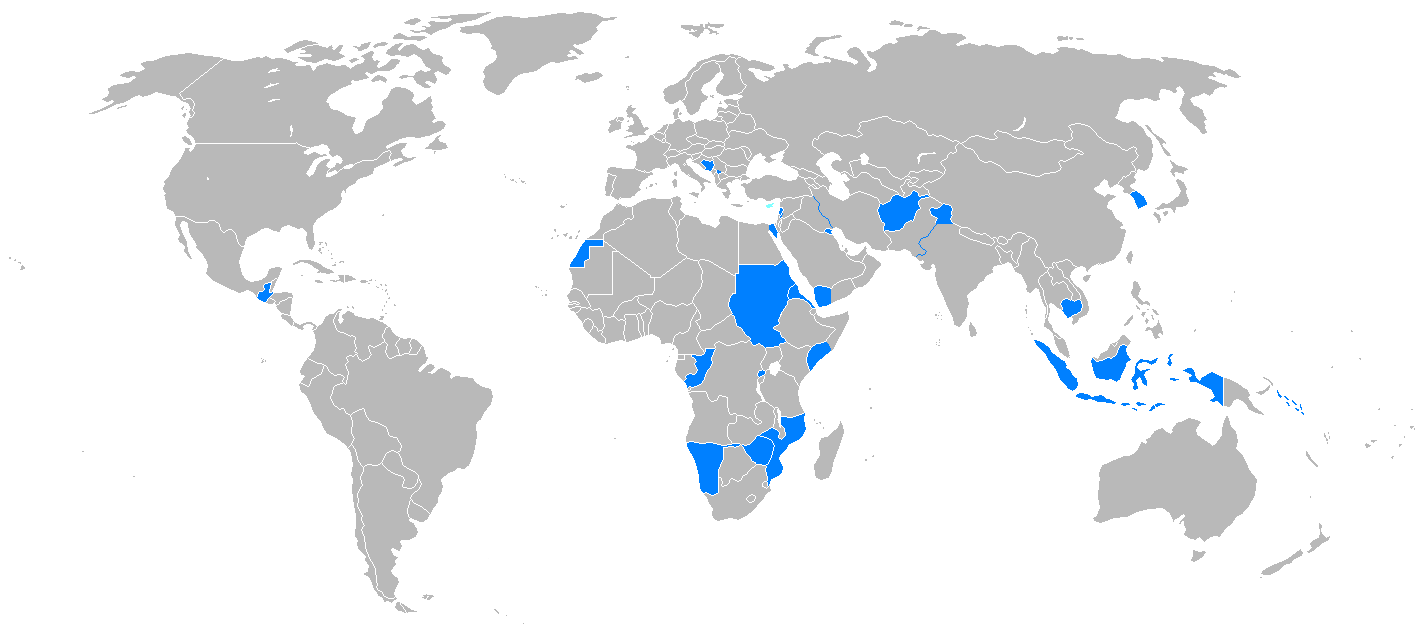
Australian peacekeeping deployments since 1945

Australian military involvement in peacekeeping operations has been diverse, and included participation in both United Nations sponsored missions, as well as those as part of ad hoc coalitions. Indeed, Australians have been involved in more conflicts as peacekeepers than as belligerents; however, according to Peter Londey "in comparative international terms, Australia has only been a moderately energetic peacekeeper." Although Australia has had peacekeepers in the field continuously for 60 years – the first occasion being in Indonesia in 1947, when Australians were among the first group of UN military observers – its commitments have generally been limited, consisting of small numbers of high-level and technical support troops (e.g. signals, engineers or medical units) or observers and police. David Horner has noted that the pattern changed with the deployment of 600 engineers to Namibia in 1989–90 as the Australian contribution to UNTAG. From the mid-1990s, Australia has been involved in a series of high-profile operations, deploying significantly large units of combat troops in support of a number of missions including those in Cambodia, Rwanda, Somalia and later in East Timor. Australia has been involved in close to 100 separate missions, involving more than 30,000 personnel and 11 Australians have died during these operations.

== Overview ==
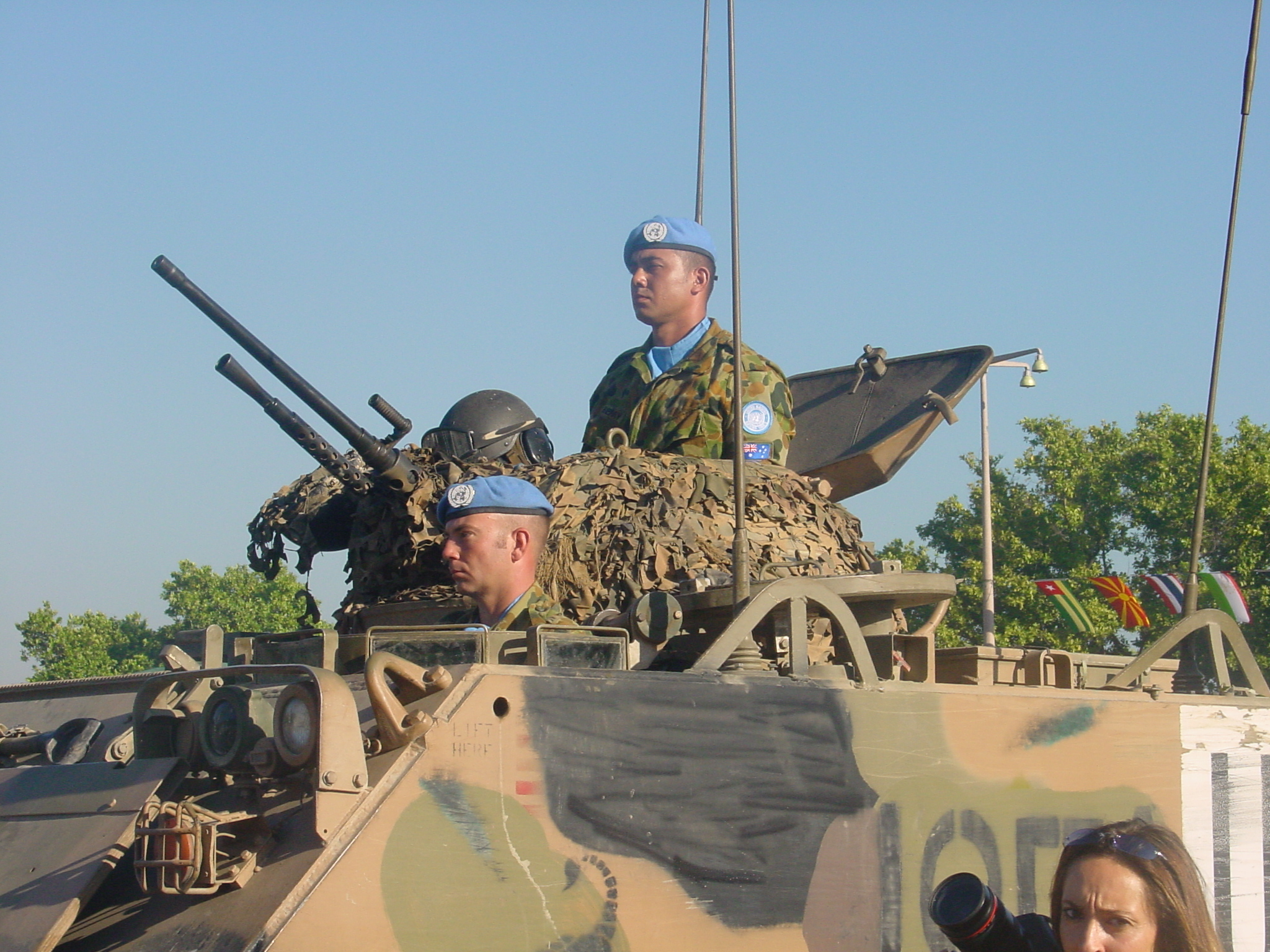
Australian soldiers in a M-113 armoured personnel carrier during a peacekeeping deployment to East Timor in 2002

Australian involvement in international peacekeeping began in 1947 when a small contingent, consisting of just four officers—two Army, one Navy and one Air Force—were deployed to the Dutch East Indies (present-day Indonesia) in September of that year, being deployed as military observers under the auspices of the United Nations Good Offices Commission, during the Indonesian National Revolution. A total of 45 Australians were eventually deployed as part of this commitment, which ended in 1951. After that first operation, Australia's involvement in peacekeeping expanded slowly. Between 1950 and 1989, these commitments, while numerous remained small-scale, consisting of the deployment of small numbers of troops in support roles. In 1989, however, this changed when Australia committed a sizeable engineer force to Namibia; after this, throughout the 1990s Australia made further contributions to peacekeeping operations in various places around the world including the Middle East, Cambodia, Somalia and Rwanda, and in many cases—for example in Somalia where an infantry battalion group was deployed—these deployments have consisted of sizeable numbers of combat troops. Between 1994 and 2003, military observers were sent to Bougainville as part of a peace monitoring mission, firstly as the South Pacific Peacekeeping Force and then the Truce and Peace Monitoring Groups. In 1999, Australia's involvement in peacekeeping reached a new level when it took the lead in deploying a force that peaked at around 6,000 personnel, to East Timor during that country's emergence as an independent nation, before handing over to a UN-led mission in 2000; further commitments to East Timor were also made throughout the following decade as episodes of unrest occurred. Between 2003 and 2013, a total of 7,270 Australian personnel rotated through the Solomon Islands as part of Regional Assistance Mission to Solomon Islands. The early years of the 21st century also saw the deployment of thousands of personnel to operations in Iraq and Afghanistan in warfighting roles. In addition, smaller scale commitments were made to missions in Africa, including to places like Sierra Leone, Ethiopia, Eritrea, Sudan and Darfur.

== List of peacekeeping operations ==
Australians have been involved in the following peacekeeping operations:

- Indonesia (1947–51)
- Kashmir (1950–85)
- Korea (1953–1957)
- Israel – under Operation Paladin (1956–present)
- Congo (1960–61)
- West New Guinea (1962–63)
- Yemen (1963)
- Cyprus (1964–present)
- India/Pakistan Border (1965–66)
- Sinai – under Operation Mazurka (1976–79; 1982–86; 1993–present)
- Israel/Syria Border (1974)
- Lebanon (1978)
- Zimbabwe (1979–80)
- Uganda (1982–84)
- Iran (1988–90)
- Thailand/Cambodia Border (1989–93)
- Namibia – under UNTAG (1989–90)
- Afghanistan (1989–93) – under the United Nations Mine Clearance Training Team (UNMCTT)
- Iraqi Kurdistan – under Operation Habitat (1991)
- Iraq (1991–99)
- Western Sahara (1991–94)
- Cambodia – under UNTAC (1991–93)
- Somalia – under Operation Solace (1992–95)
- Yugoslavia (1992)
- Rwanda (1994–95)
- Mozambique (1994–2002)
- Bougainville (1994; 1997–2003)
- Haiti (1994–95)
- Guatemala (1997)
- Yugoslavia (1997–present)
- Kosovo (1999–present)
- East Timor – under INTERFET, UNTAET, UNMISET, Operation Tower and Operation Astute (1999–2013)
- Solomon Islands – under RAMSI (2000–13)
- Ethiopia/Eritrea (2000–present)
- Sierra Leone (2000–03)
- Sudan – under UNMIS and Operation Azure (2005–11)
- Darfur – under Operation Hedgerow (2007–present)
- South Sudan – under UNMISS and Operation Aslan(2011–present)

Seven multinational operations have been commanded by Australians:

- Lieutenant General Robert Nimmo was Chief Military Observer of the UN Military Observer Group in India and Pakistan from 1950 to 1966
- Colonel Keith Howard was acting Chief of Staff of the UN Truce Supervision Organisation from September to December 1975
- Lieutenant General John Sanderson was Force Commander of the UN Transitional Authority in Cambodia from 1992 to 1993
- Major General David Ferguson was Force Commander of the Multinational Force and Observers in the Sinai from 1994 to 1997
- Richard Butler led the UN Special Commission in Iraq from 1997 to 1999
- Major General Timothy Ford was Chief of Staff of the UN Truce Supervision Organisation from 1998 to 2000
- Major General Peter Cosgrove commanded the International Force East Timor (INTERFET) from 1999 to 2000
- Major General Ian Gordon was Chief of Staff of the UN Truce Supervision Organisation from 2006 to 2008
- Major General Simon Stuart was Force Commander of the Multinational Force and Observers in the Sinai from 2017 to 2019.
- Major General Cheryl Pearce was Force Commander of the United Nations Peacekeeping Force in Cyprus from 2019 to 2021.

== See also ==
- Military of Australia
- Official History of Australian Peacekeeping, Humanitarian and Post-Cold War Operations
