= United Nations Commission for the Unification and Rehabilitation of Korea =

Commission established in 1951

The 1951 UN Commission for the Unification and Rehabilitation of Korea (UNCURK) occurred as part of the Korean War. Many of the participating nations include those who participated in the United Nations Command.

It was disbanded in 1973.

== See also ==
- UNCMAC - the UN Command Military Armistice Commission
- UNCOK - the UN Commission on Korea
- Neutral Nations Supervisory Commission - the international Korean Armistice Agreement monitoring entity
