= Operation Blazer =

Military Operation in Iraq in 1990s

Operation Blazer was the Australian services contribution to the United Nations Special Commission (UNSCOM) between May 1991 and June 1998. Established in 1991 under the auspices of UN Resolutions 687 and 715, UNSCOM was tasked to oversee the destruction, monitoring and verification of Iraq's weapons of mass destruction program.

== Development of the Australian contribution ==
On 29 May 1991, the Australian Chief of the Defence Force, General Peter Gration issued a warning order for Operation Blazer, tasking the Land Commander, Major General Murray Blake, to mount and conduct the operation. Over the following seven years, approximately 135 Australian Defence Force (ADF) officers, non-commissioned officers and other Australian Government officials took part in the weapons inspections, mostly with UNSCOM but some with IAEA.

=== First deployments ===
The first members of Operation Blazer deployed to Iraq on 6 July 1991, as part of a nuclear inspection (UNSCOM 6) from 6–20 July. This was followed by involvement in the first biological weapons inspection between 1–8 August (UNSCOM 7/BW 1), under Dr David Kelly, and a chemical weapons inspection between 15 and 22 August. For the remainder of 1991, the members of Operation Blazer, assisted by Rod Barton, undertook further nuclear, biological and chemical inspections, before returning to Australia in December 1991.

=== Chemical weapons destruction ===
On 7 April 1992, UNSCOM requested that Australia assist with the identification and destruction of chemical weapons, which Australia agreed to on 7 May. The first ADF members deployed to Iraq in late June 1992, to assist in establishing the Chemical Destruction Group at Al Muthanna State Establishment. This work extended into 1993, with ADF members on 6 month deployments. An ADF medical officer and medical assistant was added to the team in January 1993. Other chemical, biological and ballistic missile inspections also continued in 1993. By June 1993, the ADF members had completed their work with the Chemical Destruction Group and returned to Australia, with ADF support being ad hoc through the remainder of 1993 and reaching its lowest level in the first half of 1994. Further Australian Government representatives deployed in the second half of 1994, as part of several biological weapons inspections, which included interviews with Dr Rihab Taha (UNSCOM 84/BW 6).

=== Biological weapons program ===
During 1995, Australia continued to deploy specialist scientific and engineering personnel for specific inspections, with an aerial observer based in Baghdad on a rotational basis. With Iraq's admission on 01 July 1995 to UNSCOM that they had been pursuing a biological weapons program, and the subsequent 'discovery' of documents relating to the program, Australia increased its involvement from September 1995 and through 1996, with the deployment of ADF and government personnel to the Biological Groups, and biological, chemical and other short term inspections, such as UNSCOM 143 and UNSCOM 150, which investigated the concealment of Iraq's programs. During 1997, Australia continued to provide the medical officer, chief aerial inspector and inspectors for the biological group, with an increase in ADF personnel on short-term inspection missions, including as part of the Capable Sites Concealment Inspection (CSCI) team. On 01 June 1997, Richard Butler took over from Rolf Ekéus as the Chief Executive of UNSCOM. Iraq's ban on United States inspectors on 30 October led to the withdrawal of all UNSCOM inspectors, which was resolved after Russian mediation, with inspectors returning on 21 November 1997.

=== Final deployments ===
While coalition forces were being built up in Kuwait in early 1998, including ADF units as part of Operation Pollard, Australia continued to provide personnel to the Baghdad Monitoring and Verification Centre (BMVC) in the Canal Hotel, to Technical Expert Meetings, and as part of short term biological weapons and CSCI inspections. Australian personnel were also involved in inspections of presidential sites between 20 March and 09 April 1998. In the second half of 1998, while UNSCOM was finding it increasingly difficult to carry out inspections, Australia continued to support UNSCOM with staff in the BMVC, including medical staff, and planned to deploy further personnel on inspections. Warned of possible air strikes, Richard Butler evacuated all staff from Baghdad on 11 November 1998, returning on 17 November 1998. On 15 December 1998, all staff were again evacuated just prior to Operation Desert Fox. While several Australian were deployed to UNSCOM in late 1998, they were based in New York and had no involvement in further inspections.

== See also ==
- List of military operations involving Australia
- Operation Mass Appeal
- Scott Ritter
