= United Nations Commission on Korea =

Commission to end Korean trusteeship (1948–1950)

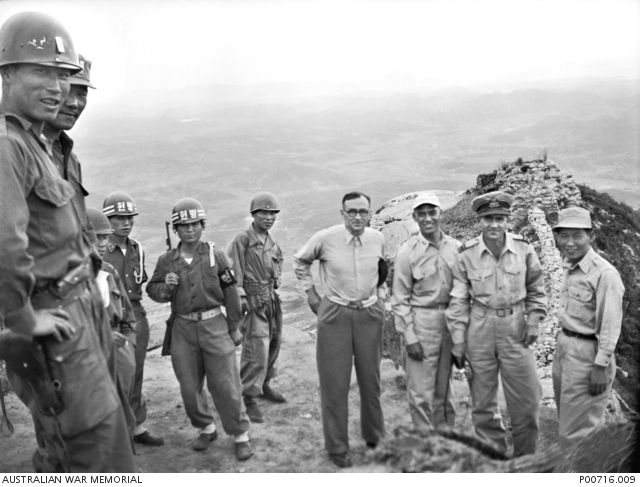
UNCOK observers with ROK troops on a hill on the 38th Parallel near Kaesong, June 1950

The United Nations Commission on Korea (UNCOK; Korean: 유엔 한국 위원회) was established on 12 December 1948 by the United Nations (UN) to deal with various issues relating to the trusteeship of Korea. It was eventually dissolved on 7 October 1950.

== Background ==
After Korea was liberated from its status as a colony of the Empire of Japan at the end of World War II, the peninsula had been divided between the Soviet Civil Administration in the North and the United States Army Military Government in Korea in the South. As part of the original agreement to establish both governments, they both intended to eventually withdraw from the Korean peninsula.

On 14 November 1947, the UN General Assembly passed a resolution that created the UN Temporary Commission on Korea (UNTCOK). This was intended to oversee elections throughout the peninsula, but it was unacknowledged in the North and only partially successful.

== Description ==
The commission was established on 12 December 1948 as a result of UN General Assembly Resolution 195 (III). The goal of UNCOK was to arrange for a withdrawal of foreign troops and a peaceful reunification of peninsula.

On 21 October 1949, the General Assembly passed Resolution 293 (IV), which changed the UNCOK's mandate. It added a requirement to observe and report changes that "might lead to or otherwise involve military conflict in Korea". According to a report from the Canadian Government, this eventually became UNCOK's primary role. Two Australian observers were the first to report North Korea invasion of South Korea on 25 June 1950 at the beginning of the Korean War.

UNCOK was terminated on 7 October 1950, when the General Assembly created the United Nations Commission for the Unification and Rehabilitation of Korea (UNCURK).

== See also ==
- United Nations Temporary Commission on Korea – Predecessor to the UNCOK
- UN Command Military Armistice Commission
- UN Commission for the Unification and Rehabilitation of Korea
- Neutral Nations Supervisory Commission - the international Korean Armistice Agreement monitoring entity
