= United Nations Command Military Armistice Commission =

Multinational forces commission to defend the ceasefire in the Korean Conflict

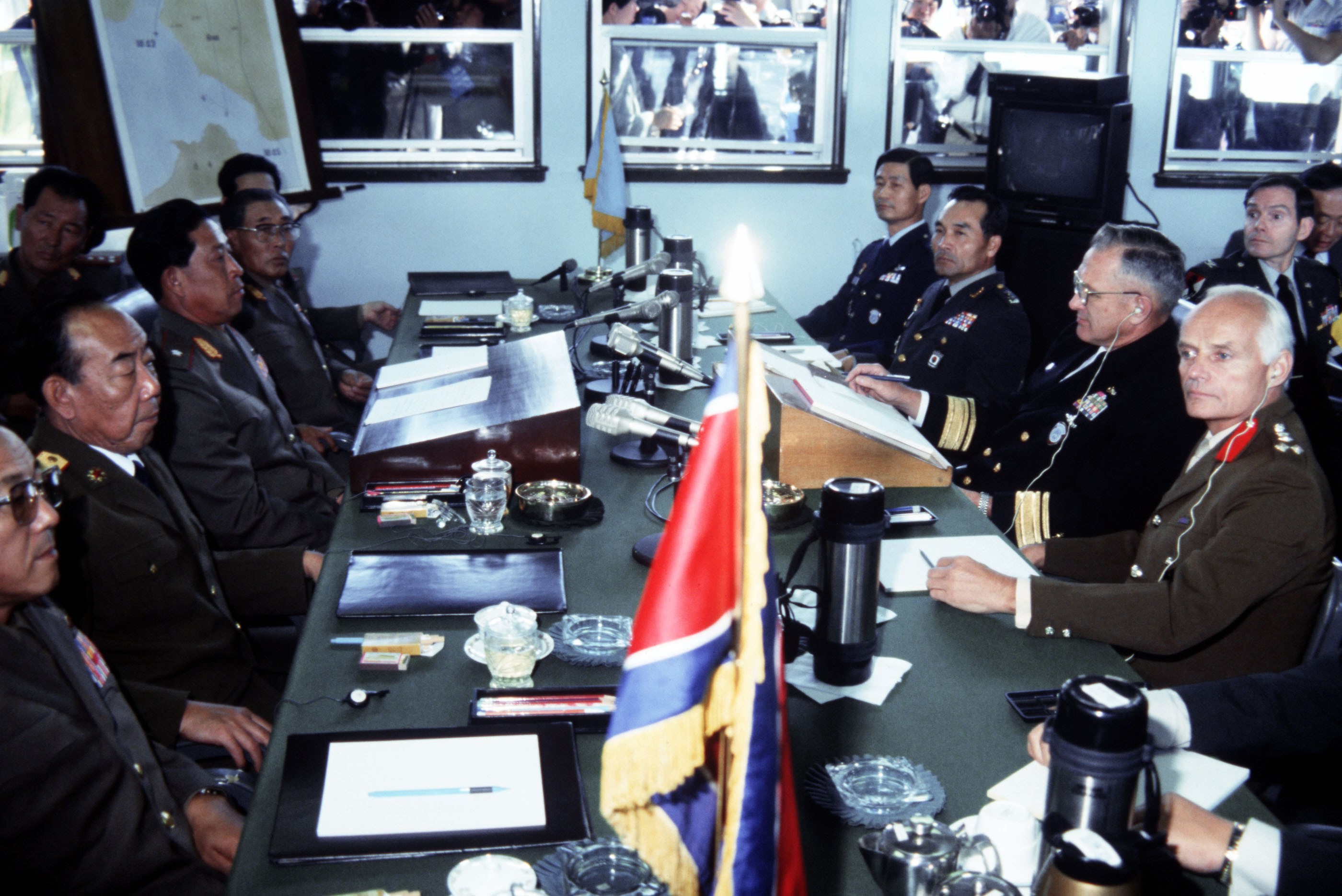
The 458th Military Armistice Commission meeting in 1990

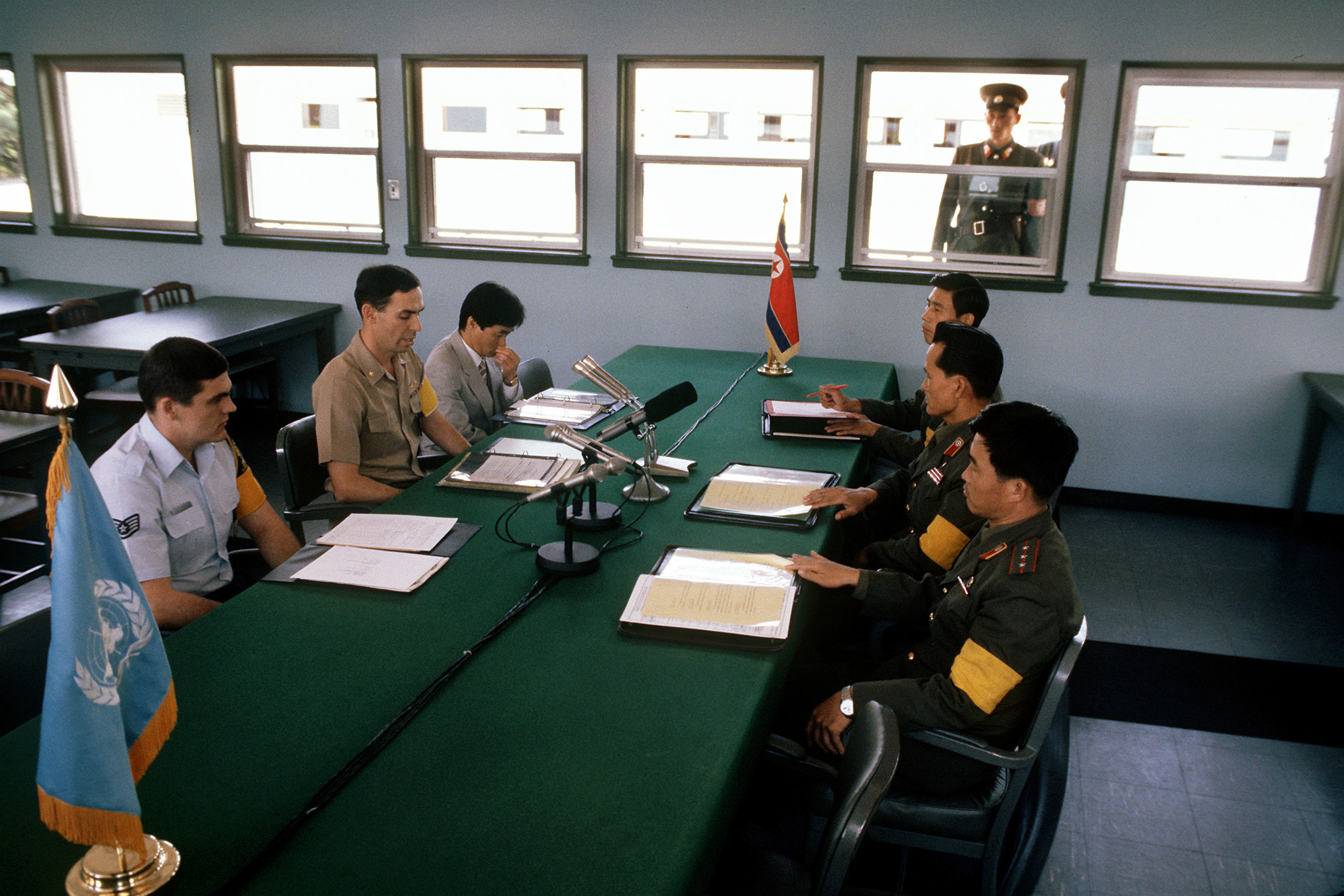
A joint duty officers meeting in the Military Armistice Building in 1989

The United Nations Command Military Armistice Commission (UNCMAC) was established in July 1953 at the end of the Korean War. The mission of UNCMAC is to supervise the Military Armistice Agreement between the two Koreas along the 151 mile Demilitarized Zone (DMZ). UNCMAC is headquartered in Seoul and Panmunjom.

== History ==
Between 1950 and 1953 a coalition of forces from 21 nations fought to preserve the sovereignty of the Republic of Korea (ROK), following the invasion by the Democratic People's Republic of Korea (DPRK) under the United Nations flag in the Korean War. The Korean War did not result in a decisive victory for either side; instead an Armistice Agreement was signed in 1953, bringing the active conflict to a close. The United Nations Command, established under the mandate of UN Security Council Resolution 83 and Resolution 84, represented the world's first attempt at collective security.

The parties to conflict established the Military Armistice Commission (MAC) to manage the implementation of the terms of the armistice, to investigate alleged violations, to serve as an intermediary between the commanders of the opposing sides, and to settle through negotiation any violations of the Armistice Agreement. The MAC is a combined organisation consisting of ten senior military officers: five through UNC Commander appointment and five appointed by the commanders of the DPRK's Korean People's Army and Chinese People's Liberation Army.

The Armistice Agreement also established Secretariats on both sides to assist the MAC, as directed. The Secretariats continue to operate today and maintain an open line of communication to support maintenance of the terms of Armistice.

The first chief of staff was Major General John P. Daley, who later served as a commission member. The first meeting of the MAC convened on 28 July 1953, with representatives from the UNC, the DPRK's Korean People's Army, and China's People's Volunteers Army. By 1991, the UNC Commander decided that timing was appropriate to designate a ROK military officer as the UNC's Senior Member to the MAC and as the Commander's lead delegate for maintenance and enforcement of the Korean Armistice Agreement. The decision came in part to facilitate inter-Korean engagement at a time when the two governments were seeking rapprochement. By then, the MAC had met over 450 times, but the KPA refused to hold any further MAC meetings with a ROK officer as the Senior Member. By 1994, the PVA formally removed its delegates from the MAC, though the KPA maintains a delegation within the Joint Security Area in Panmunjom. All the while, UNC has maintained its position that its lead delegate for the commission should be an ROK officer.

The UNC Commander continues to appoint five individuals to the MAC. The current composition is one ROK Major General as Senior Member, one U.S. Major General, one British Brigadier, one ROK Brigadier General, and one rotating (on a six-month basis) Senior Officer from other countries (Australia, Belgium, Canada, Colombia, France, New Zealand, Philippines, Thailand, Turkey) that maintain liaison with the UNC. The Senior Member continues to play an important role in Armistice maintenance and enforcement, including the issuance of directives for special investigations in response to alleged Armistice violations.

== See also ==
- United Nations Command
- UNCOK – the UN Commission on Korea
- UNCURK – the UN Commission for the Unification and Rehabilitation of Korea
- Neutral Nations Supervisory Commission – the international Korean Armistice Agreement monitoring entity
