= Operation Vic Fire Assist =

Operation Vic Fire Assist was the Australian Defence Force contribution to the relief effort following the Black Saturday bushfires. The Defence contribution peaked at around 850 personnel in mid February; with the majority of Defence assets concluding operations on Saturday 14 March 2009.

The ADF assistance provided a temporary logistic framework until more appropriate, long-term options became available. Defence provided emergency sleeping arrangements and substantial meals for fire affected families and emergency workers in Yea, Warragul, Marysville and Kinglake.

Troops searched approximately 120 square kilometres of fire damaged areas, which included around 1300 houses. This included the townships of Kinglake, Flowerdale, Hazeldene, Marysville, St Andrews, Yarra Glen and Traralgon.

As part of the reasonable search phase, teams conducted thorough and methodical searches of 817 premises in Marysville, Strathewen, Castella, Toolangi, Chum Creek, Dixon's Creek and Steeles Creek.
