= Neutral Nations Supervisory Commission =

Body overseeing the Korean armistice

- Flag of the NNSC
- Founded: July 27, 1953
- Countries: Czechoslovakia → Czech Republic; Poland; Sweden; Switzerland
- Allegiance: Korean Armistice Agreement

The Neutral Nations Supervisory Commission (NNSC) was established by the Korean Armistice Agreement signed 27 July 1953, declaring an armistice in the Korean War. It is, with the Military Armistice Commission, part of the mechanism regulating the relations between the Democratic People's Republic of Korea (DPRK, North Korea) and the Republic of Korea (ROK, South Korea).

The mission of the NNSC is to carry out inspections and investigations to ensure implementation of sub-paragraphs 13(c) and 13(d) of the Armistice, which prevent reinforcements being brought into Korea, either additional military personnel or new weapons, other than the piece-for-piece replacement of damaged or worn out equipment. Reports are to be made to the Military Armistice Commission.

According to the Armistice, the NNSC shall be composed of four senior officers, two of whom shall be appointed by neutral nations nominated by the United Nations Command (UNC) and two of whom shall be appointed by neutral nations nominated jointly by the Korean People's Army (KPA) and the Chinese People's Volunteers (CPV). The term "neutral nations" was defined as those nations whose combat forces did not participate in the hostilities in Korea. The United Nations Command chose Switzerland and Sweden, while the Korean People's Army and Chinese People's Volunteers chose Czechoslovakia and Poland.

The NNSC was supported by twenty Neutral Nations Inspection Teams, ten permanently located at ports in North and South Korea, and ten mobile teams. The Armistice did not specify the manner of operation of the teams. The Swiss and Swedish teams were of a small size, relying on their hosts to provide personnel support, vehicles, and communication equipment to report back to the Supervisory Commission. The Czechoslovak and Polish teams were much larger and fully self-sufficient, including heavy radio trucks, police, interpreters, bands, cooks and mess equipment.

== History ==
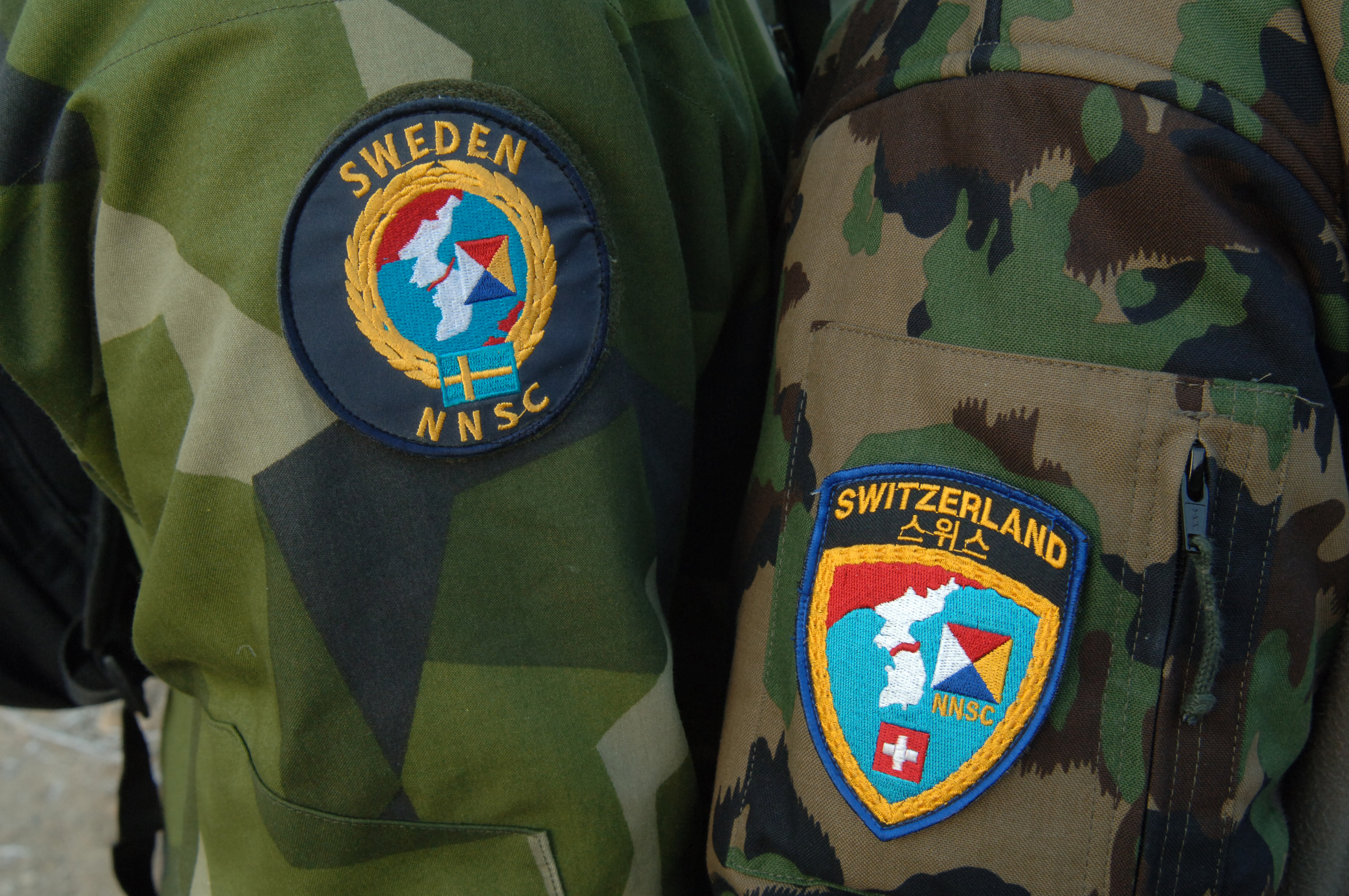
Uniform patches worn by NNSC delegates from Sweden and Switzerland

=== 1953–1957 ===
The first meeting of the NNSC took place on 1 August 1953.

In 1954, there had been hostility to the NNSC inspections by the South Koreans, and doubts by the UNC, Switzerland and Sweden about the balanced application of inspections. On 31 July, after warnings from the South Korean military that action would take place if the NNSC did not withdraw from South Korea, demonstrators attempted to enter the Incheon NNSC camp, but were stopped by United States guards. After discussion within the NNSC, and with the agreement of the Military Armistice Commission, the inspection teams' strengths were reduced by about half.

In March 1955, the South Korean national assembly unanimously passed a resolution that NNSC inspection teams should be expelled from South Korea. In May 1955, the U.S. decided that the NNSC should be told that its operations were seriously disadvantaging the UNC forces, and that the "UNC proposed in future to regard Article 13(d) of Armistice agreement as inoperative". In August 1955, South Korean President Syngman Rhee demanded NNSC members leave South Korea, and 1,200 railway workers and 300 South Korean war veterans tried to storm the Wolmi-do Island NNSC compound, but were held back by several hundred U.S. troops using tear gas. Demonstrations against NNSC inspection teams continued through September and October.

On 31 May 1956, the UNC required that the NNSC fixed inspection teams be withdrawn from South Korean ports, as the U.S. believed North Korea was being rearmed avoiding NNSC inspection. This was opposed by North Korea in the Military Armistice Commission, but was effected on 9 June 1956. Following this, NNSC inspection teams in North Korea were withdrawn in the following days. From this time onward, NNSC activities were limited to recording information offered by both sides, and staffing levels were reduced.

At a meeting of the Military Armistice Commission on 21 June 1957, the U.S. informed the North Korean representatives that the UNC no longer considered itself bound by paragraph 13(d) of the armistice which prevented the introduction of new weapons into Korea, and enforcement of which was the primary mission of the NNSC. In January 1958, U.S. nuclear armed Honest John missiles and 280mm atomic cannons were deployed to South Korea, a year later adding nuclear armed Matador cruise missiles with the range to reach China and the Soviet Union.

=== 1958–1995 ===
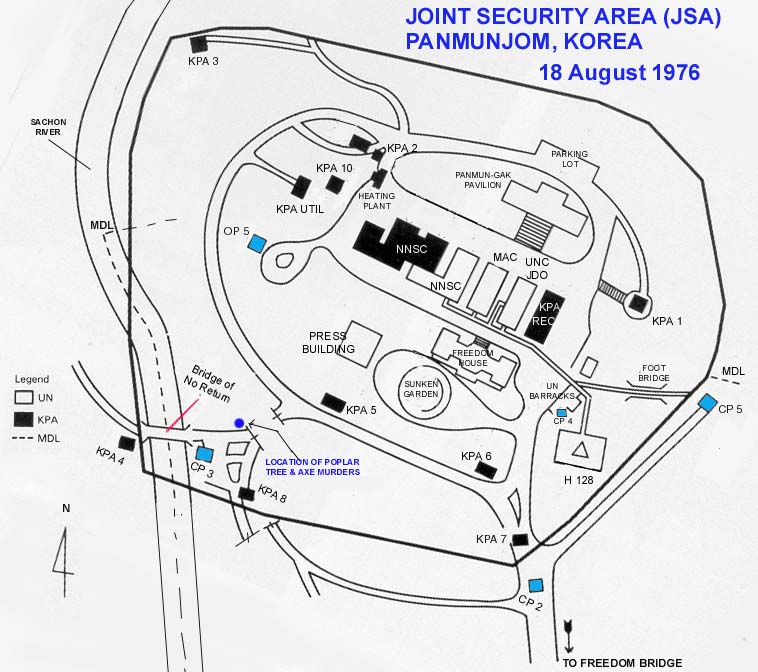
Map of the JSA showing NNSC buildings and location of CP# 5, the entrance to the Swedish and Swiss NNSC Camp

North Korea viewed the NNSC as existing in name only after the inspection teams were withdrawn. A 1970 report on the NNSC by the U.S. Arms Control and Disarmament Agency concluded "Since the NNSC was established only to observe the enforcement of 13(c) and 13(d), it ceased, therefore, to have any function."

The Chief Historian of the NNSC described this situation as:

The Americans and South Koreans, no longer hampered by the presence of the Czechoslovacs and Poles and free to accelerate the modernization of their armament, now showed less haste to do away with a body which had ceased to inconvenience them and might even serve to restrain the propaganda against them by the North Koreans and Chinese. The Neutral Nations Supervisory Commission thus remains a facade, maintained only because of apprehension about the void which would occur if it were abolished.

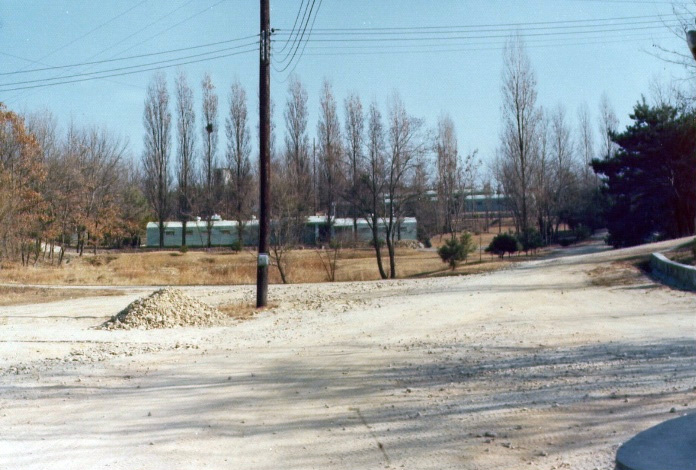
Entrance to the NNSC camp in 1976

From June 1956 to 1993, the NNSC ceased their controls but solely forwarded the war parties' reports on entering and leaving military persons to the UNCMAC. The strengths of the delegations from Poland, Czechoslovakia, Sweden and Switzerland were reduced gradually: On 9 June 1956 to 14 members each, in 1960 to nine members each, and in 1978 to six members each. Residing inside the Joint Security Area (JSA) are the offices and conference room for the NNSC.

Camps for the Swedish and Swiss members and their staffs are located in the southern half of the Korean Demilitarized Zone (DMZ) adjacent to the JSA. The former Polish and Czech camps which were located nearby on the north Korean side of the Military Demarcation Line, have been taken over by the KPA and are now used for other purposes.

Following the collapse of communism leading to Czechoslovakia and Poland joining NATO, and the dissolution of Czechoslovakia into the Czech Republic and Slovakia in 1993, North Korea believed the NNSC had lost its neutrality, and took the view that the NNSC had collapsed. North Korea expelled the Czech component in 1993 and the Polish component in 1995.

Since 1995, North Korea has not recognized the existence of the NNSC. The Swedish and Swiss delegations continue to submit reports on South Korean troop movements to North Korea, which are ignored. Poland continues to attend NNSC meetings, although it is no longer able to observe troop movements in North Korea.

=== Post-2008 status ===
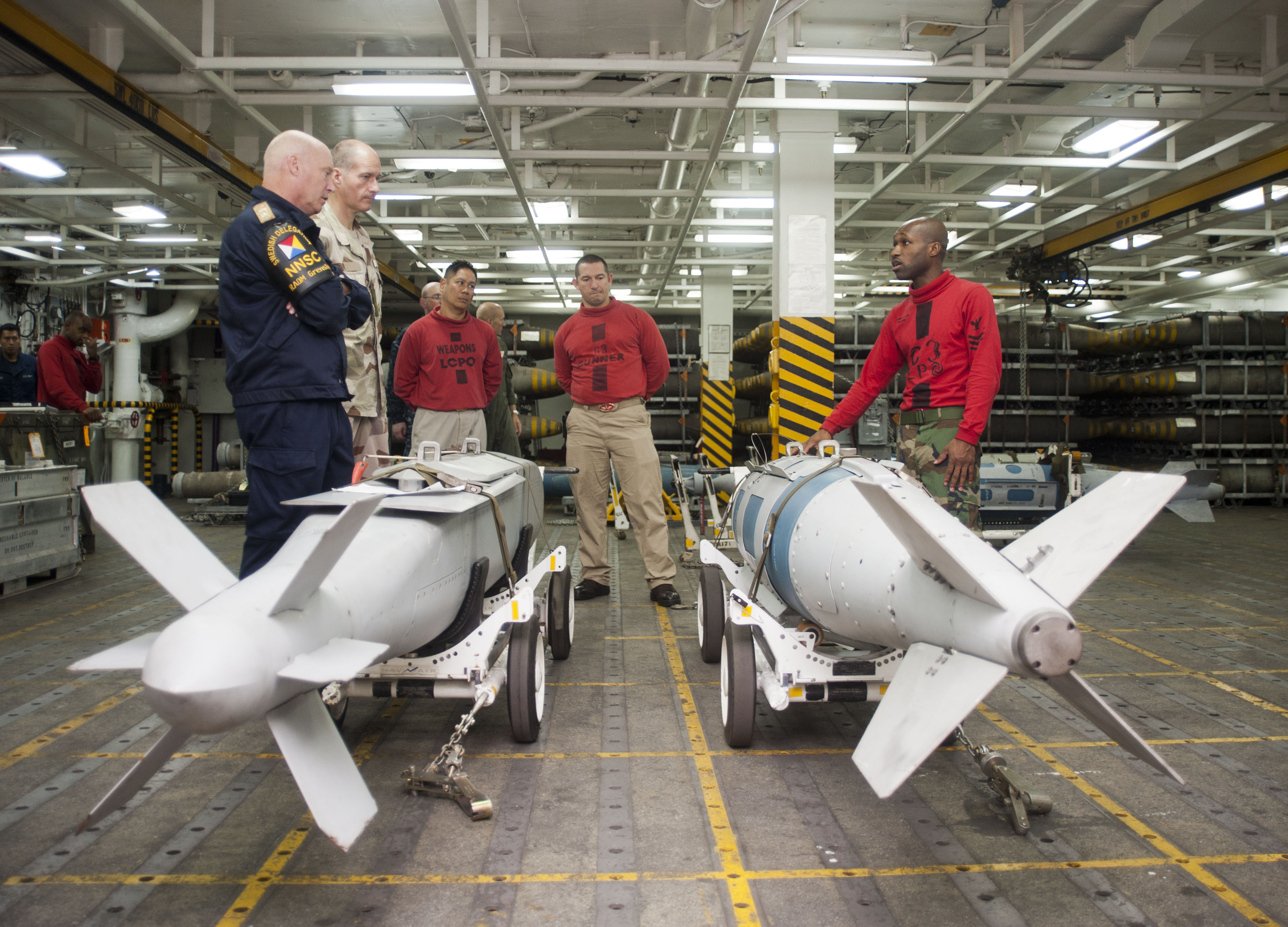
A Swedish NNSC delegate views guided bombs on an overnight visit to USS George Washington (CVN 73) in 2012

Since 2008, the main role of the NNSC is to maintain and build relations with both sides, and maintain a channel of communications between them. Five Swiss and five Swedish representatives are stationed near Panmunjom, South Korea, on duty for the NNSC. Presently, their main task is to show presence at the inner Korean border and thus demonstrate that the ceasefire is still in force. As of November 2023, representatives of the Swiss and Swedish delegations meet once a week to "[ensure] the exchange of information" between them.

Occasionally, Polish delegates attend the meetings at Panmunjom, but through South Korea, as Poland has changed sides politically. The promotion of détente and security in the Joint Security Area (JSA) also falls within the framework of these activities and are the prerequisites for the accomplishment of these tasks.

The Swedish delegation describes its current task as maintaining the validity of the truce mechanism. It describes the NNSC as currently having ongoing contact with the UNC, but no contact with North Korea.

The NNSC continues to monitor troop levels in South Korea, and monitor the large U.S. and South Korean annual military exercises. Whenever North Koreans enter South Korea, NNSC members may interview them to determine whether they want to be repatriated or defect to the South. On occasion, the NNSC participates in UNC Military Armistice Commission investigations, such as into South Korea's actions during naval skirmishes.

Poland continues to send representatives to commission meetings twice a year, which the NNSC regards as legitimizing its position with 75% of the original delegations intact.

In 2014, the practice of opening the NNSC conference hut door onto North Korean territory to indicate a new report was available stopped, as North Korea indicated it was an "offensive gesture".

The annual cost of the NNSC is about $4 million. Maintenance and repair of the facilities at the NNSC Camp are the responsibility of the US Army Directorate of Public Works (DPW) for Area I, located at Camp Red Cloud.

In 2023, NNSC buildings in the Joint Security Area were upgraded, which involved the demolition of some of its original 1950s wooden huts. The 70th anniversary meeting of the NNSC took place on 20 June 2023, with representatives of Sweden, Switzerland, and Poland, in Warsaw.

== Neutral nation delegations history ==
Swiss NNSC delegation size
Year	Staff numbers
1953	96
1956	14
1960	9
1978	6
1994	5

=== Switzerland ===
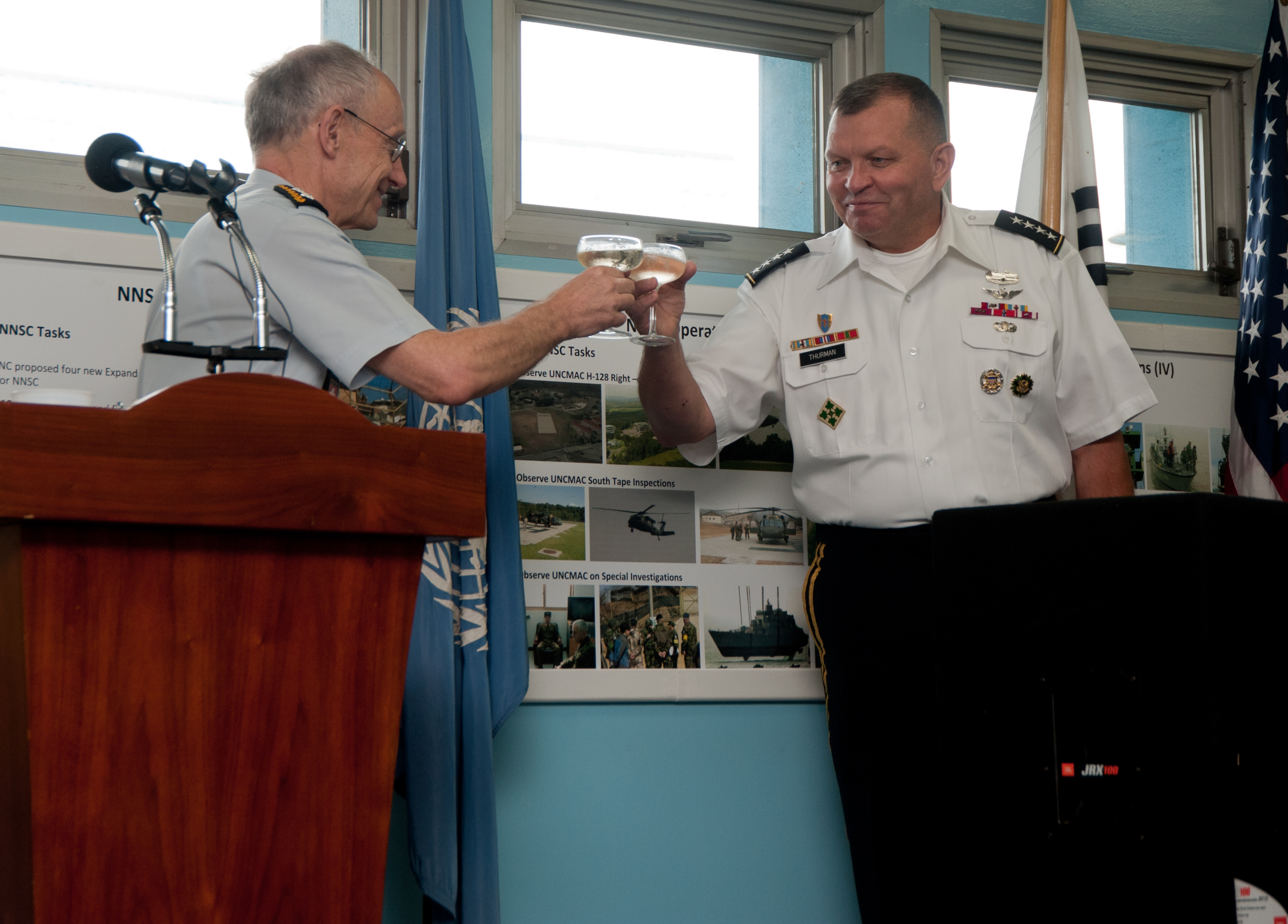
Swiss NNSC delegate, Maj. Gen. Jean-Jacques Joss, with USFK Commander, Gen. James D. Thurman, at a 58th armistice anniversary event

On 1 August 1953, the first Swiss NNSC delegation, consisting of 96 members, arrived, expanding to about 150 within a few months to assist with monitoring, according to a Stars and Stripes report. After the Inspection Team had been disbanded, the delegation was reduced to 14 members. In subsequent years, the delegation was successively reduced to the current size of five. Currently the head of delegation, chosen from the Ministry of Defence or Ministry of Foreign Affairs, is on assignment for three to five years. Four reserve military officers assist on one to two year assignments.

=== Czechoslovakia ===
A more than 300-strong Czechoslovak group arrived in Panmunjom partly by train and partly by air on the turn of July and August 1953. In the first four years of existence of the NNSC, some 500–600 Czechoslovaks participated. The story of the first Czechoslovak contingent is covered in the book The Korean Peninsula after the Armistice as Seen by Czechoslovak Delegates to the Neutral Nations Supervisory Commission, which contains over 250 photographs made by members of the Czechoslovak contingent between 1953 and 1956 and four texts about the early history of the NNSC written by Seungju Hong, Jaroslav Olša Jr., Gabriel Jonsson and Alex Švamberk. Samples of photographs were published elsewhere in Korean and Czech press, e.g. in The Korea Times. Introductory text from the book covering history of Czechoslovak-North Korean relations and the beginning of NNSC is available online.

Later, the size of Czechoslovak contingent became significantly smaller. After the peaceful split of Czechoslovakia, both new republics agreed that the Czech Republic would take over its membership in the NNSC. In April 1993, Czech members were forced to leave their camp in Panmunjeom under the threat from North Korea. Since then, the Czech Republic has not taken part in NNSC meetings.

In 2013, on the occasion of the 60th anniversary of signing of the armistice, the Embassy of the Czech Republic in South Korea organized a series of events to commemorate Czechoslovak participation in the NNSC.

=== Poland ===
The first shift of the Polish contingent consisted of 301 individuals and began its operations on 1 August 1953, with General Mieczysław Wągrowski as its commander. Political changes in Europe in the late 80s and early 90s prompted the North Korean authorities to seek a change in the nature of the Neutral Nations Supervisory Commission. Pyongyang believed that Poland, due to the political changes after 1989, had lost its neutral status. Pressures began to withdraw the Polish Mission from the NNSC. In November 1994, the North Korean Ministry of Foreign Affairs, in an official note to Poland, announced that "the legal effect of appointing Poland as a member of the Neutral Nations Supervisory Commission under Article 37 of the Armistice Agreement has expired." Ultimately, Poland was forced to leave the NNSC camp on the North Korean side in 1995. However, Poland chose not to follow the path of the Czech Republic and remained in the Neutral Nations Supervisory Commission. This decision was influenced by the provisions of the Armistice Agreement and international commitments undertaken by Warsaw – without Poland's participation, the NNSC would lose its purpose. Since 1995, the Polish Mission to NNSC operates in the demilitarized zone, with access from the South Korean side.

== In popular culture ==
- A Swiss Army NNSC delegate is the central character in the 2000 South Korean mystery thriller film Joint Security Area.
