= Operation Hedgerow =

Operation Hedgerow is the Australian Defence Force's (ADF) contribution to the United Nations African Union Mission in Darfur (UNAMID).

The UNAMID is a joint African Union and United Nations peacekeeping mission formally approved by United Nations Security Council Resolution 1769 on 31 July 2007 to bring stability to the war-torn Darfur region of Sudan while peace talks on a final settlement continue.

== Role ==
The ADF was to contribute nine personnel, specialists in operations, logistics and movements planning, who would be primarily based in the UNAMID headquarters at El Fasher. The first four ADF personnel were deployed on 14 August 2008 for six months.
