= Operation Azure =

Operation Azure is the name given to the Australian Defence Force's contribution to the United Nations Mission in Sudan (UNMIS). UNMIS was established by the United Nations under UN Security Council Resolution 1590 of the UN Security Council on 24 March 2005, in response to the signing of the Comprehensive Peace Agreement between the government of Sudan and the Sudan People's Liberation Movement on 9 January 2005 in Nairobi, Kenya.

The Australian contingent included 17 military personnel (six military observers and 11 specialists in air movements, aviation safety and logistics) based in Khartoum.
