= Operation Tower =

Australian Defence Force peacekeeping mission to East Timor

Operation Tower is the Australian Defence Force's (ADF) contribution to the United Nations Integrated Mission in East Timor (UNMIT).

UNMIT was established on 25 August 2006 by UN Security Council Resolution 1704. Its objectives are "to support the Government in consolidating stability, enhancing a culture of democratic governance, and facilitating political dialogue among Timorese stakeholders, in their efforts to bring about a process of national reconciliation and to foster social cohesion". Its current mandate will expire on 26 February 2008.

The ADF contributed four personnel to UNMIT: three ADF personnel who are deployed as military liaison officers in districts outside Dili and one officer with the Headquarters of UNMIT in Dili.
