= International sanctions against Afghanistan =

Embargo imposed by the United Nations against Taliban-controlled Afghanistan

International sanctions have largely targeted the Taliban (flag pictured) during and between their periods of rule.

International sanctions against Afghanistan were implemented by the United Nations in November 1999. The sanctions were initially aimed at terrorists, Osama bin Laden and members of Al-Qaeda. The United States, the United Kingdom and the European Union also impose sanctions on Afghanistan.

United States sanctions were tightened against the Taliban under Executive Order 13224 after the September 11 attacks in 2001. After the fall of Kabul in the 2021 Taliban offensive the US froze the Afghan government reserves mostly held in US bank accounts. The authority to freeze these assets came from the existing sanctions against the Taliban. The country's economic future, highly depending on US aid, was called into question under the existing sanctions against the Taliban, complicating the distribution of international humanitarian aid to the beleaguered population.

== Context ==
On August 7, 1998, the US embassies in Nairobi and Dar es Salaam were bombed and Al-Qaeda had thus triggered the international public's awareness of the organisation. The Security Council condemned the bombings in general terms but did not address Al-Qaeda specifically. The same year, Resolution 1214 was adopted in which the Council demanded: "the Taliban stop providing sanctuary and training for international terrorists and their organizations".

On November 5, 1998 Osama bin Laden and his military chief Muhamad Atef were accused in the US District Court of New York for a planned attack on US defense establishments. Following this event, the US delegation to the Security Council legally required to demand the Taliban to hand over Osama bin Laden. Taliban leader Mullah Omar refused to hand over Osama bin Laden. Consequently, the Security Council implemented its first measures under the 1267 sanctions regime. In Resolution 1267, the Security Council justified the sanctions regime by referring to violation of humanitarian law in Afghanistan, discrimination against women and the presence of an illicit opiate production.

Throughout the years, the sanctions remain fundamentally focused on the Taliban. Yet, the imposing countries and institutions have repeatedly adjusted the demands of the sanctions since 2008. The objectives of the sanctions have evolved from ending armed conflict and creating a more representative government to emphasising the prevention of terrorism and women's rights, to advocating complete regime change. The positions of sanction imposer countries and institutions have shifted from neutral arbiters to robust coercers. Countries such as the US and Russia sought to contain the risk coming from the extremist ideology of the Taliban, whereas the US predominantly aimed to bring the Taliban to justice after Osama bin Laden claimed ownership over the 9/11 attacks. Accordingly, several parties pressured the UNSC to adopt more forceful measures.

== UN sanctions ==
=== UN Resolutions ===
Resolutions adopted by the United Nations' Security Council, 1267 (1999), 1333 (2000), 1363 (2001), 1373 (2001), 1390 (2002), 1452 (2002), 1455 (2003), 1526 (2004), 1566 (2004), 1617 (2005), 1624 (2005), 1699 (2006), 1730 (2006), 1735 (2006), 1822 (2008), 1904 (2009), 1988 (2011), 1989 (2011), 2082 (2012), 2083 (2012), 2133 (2014), 2160 (2014) and 2210 (2015), together expressed the goal to fully disrupt the activities of the Taliban.

=== Goals ===
The UN sanctions were designed to prevent the Taliban from supporting and conducting acts of international terrorism. United Nations Security Council Resolution 1267 imposed a series of travel and financial sanctions on members of the Tablian-controlled government of Afghanistan following the bombing of two US embassies by Al-Qaeda in East Africa and for Taliban refusing to surrender Osama bin Laden to stand trail in the US for the embassy bombings. In addition to this, the Security Council "strongly condemned [...] training and planning" of terrorists and terrorists acts and "reiterat[ed]... deep concern" of terrorist activities, as well as violations of international humanitarian law and of human rights, in particular discrimination against women and girls.

Following the US invasion of Afghanistan and the removal of the Taliban from government, the sanctions were amended to target specific individuals. These individuals were placed on a list at the request of member states.

=== Administration ===
Resolution 1267 established a Sanctions Monitoring Committee known as the al-Qaeda and Taliban Sanctions Committee. The committee is composed of the 5 permanent members of the United Nations Security Council. Namely China, France, the Russian Federation, the UK, the US and the ten other Security Council rotating members.

The al-Qaeda and Taliban Sanctions Committee is one of three counterterrorism bodies set up by the Security Council. The committee is further supported by Monitoring Groups established by subsequent resolutions. The Analytical Support and Sanctions Monitoring Team established after Resolution 1526 in 2014 and the Al-Qaeda and the Taliban and associated individuals and entities monitoring team established in Resolution 2253 in 2015.

As the nature of the Taliban changed, the original mandate of Resolution 1267 changed as well. The measures became targeted rather than blanket sanctions. United Nations member states would request the committee to add names to the list. The committee had the mandate to use its "discretionary powers to list [...] targeted individuals and entities". Guidelines to de-list individuals were established in 2006 and The Office of the Ombudsperson, established in 2009, designed to provide an independent and impartial review on requests from individuals, groups, undertaking or entities wishing to be removed from the Sanctions List.

The committee is mandated to:

- oversee the implementation of the sanctions measures
- designate individual and entities who meet the listing criteria set out in the relevant resolutions
- consider requests for exemptions from the sanctions measures
- consider requests to remove a name from the sanctions list
- conduct reviews of the entries on the sanctions list
- examine the reports presented by the Monitoring Team
- report annually to the Security Council
- conduct outreach activities

=== Types of sanctions ===
==== Asset freeze ====
The purpose of the United Nations' asset freeze was to deny listed individuals, groups or entities the "means to support or finance terrorism". The asset freeze was to ensure that no funds, financial assets or economic resources were available to al-Qaeda or any individual connected to the organisation.

The onus fell on member states to ensure that they had relevant domestic law criminalising the financing of terrorist organisations, as well as to monitor the activity of national financial institutions to ensure that they were aware of listed individuals and if necessary punish institutions that fail to freeze the assets of individuals. The UN Security Council al-Qaeda and Taliban Sanctions Committee was supported by a Monitoring Team that reported on non-compliance.

Since Resolution 1267, The United Nations Security Council has relied on cooperation with other global organisations such as Interpol and Financial Action Task Force to aid in identifying, monitoring of individuals who are financially linked to terrorist organisations.

==== Travel ban ====
The Travel Ban was a preventative measure with the purpose to stop individuals, who were on the Consolidated List, from entering or transitting through the territories of United Nations member states. With the overall aim to limit the mobility of listed individuals and decrease likelihood of an attack by the listed individuals taking place.

The onus fell on member states to implement the travel ban against all individuals on the Al-Qaeda Sanctions List, in their national guidelines in accordance with their domestic legislation. The ban applied "in all circumstances [and to] any passage".

In addition to barring individual travel, all states were obliged to deny permission to any aircraft owned or operated by, or on behalf of the Taliban. Member states were also requested to submit "photographs and other biometric data" on listed individuals so they could be included in Interpol-United Nations Security Council special notices.

==== Arms embargo ====
Introduced in 2000 by United Nations Security Council Resolution 1333, the UN imposed a mandatory arms embargo on Taliban-controlled Afghanistan. The embargo was designed to pressure the Taliban to close terrorist training camps and to further pressure the group into handing over Osama bin Laden to US authorities. The embargo was originally a blanket ban on the sale and supply of weapons to any person in the territory of Afghanistan.

The arms embargo was designed as a presentation measure and aimed to limit the ability of the Taliban to fight a civil war. The UN placed an additional embargo on the provision of "technical advice, assistance, or training related to military activities" as well as barring the establishment of military or terrorist training facilities. The UN Resolution 1333 also required member states to bar "intermediaries [...] brokers or other third parties" from supplying arms to the Taliban.

The Arms Embargo was supervised by a Committee established in accordance with resolution 1333 and was further supported by a Monitoring Group and Sanctions Enforcement Support Team. These support mechanisms had the power to review the enforcement of sanctions by member states and report to the Security Council on the implementation of the resolution at regular intervals.

The UN modified the embargo in 2002 after the fall of the Taliban regime. Resolution 1390 amended the embargo to target al-Qaeda linked individuals and entities. The resolution established a monitoring committee, which consisted of all six permanent members of the United Nations Security Council, as well as two of the ten rotating members.

=== Enforcement of sanctions ===
==== Resolution 1267 ====
Resolution 1267 was enforced by the Security Council Sanctions Committee or the al-Qaeda and Taliban Sanctions Committee.

The onus on implementing the sanctions fell upon the United Nations member states. Member states were encouraged to introduced domestic legalisation "criminalising the financing of terrorism and associated money laundering", as well as drafting new rules for aviation authorities and adding individuals on the Consolidated List to their national "no fly" list.

Once the aviation and financial sanctions went into effect in November 1999, the sanctions directly led to the "closer of Afghan bank branches" in the neighbouring country of Pakistan, as well as the cancelation of Ariana Afghan Airline's flights.

US financial institutions were bound by Executive Order 133224 to report and freeze assets. As of November 18, 2002, the US had frozen more than $200 million.

==== Resolution 1333 ====
The enforcement of Resolution 1333 was primarily the responsibility of the Al-Qaeda and Taliban Sanctions Committee. In addition to this, the Resolution established a Committee of Experts which was authorised to consult with all relevant members states and to report on the implementation of Resolution 1267.

The Committee of Experts was tasked with reviewing the implementation of the embargo as well as building the capacity of neighbouring states to enforce the sanctions. This group was known as the Sanctions Enforcement Team. Resolution 1363 (2001) outlined the assistance given to states bordering Afghanistan. The team would assist in monitoring and verifying information regarding violations, as well as assisting in reporting violations.

After the fall of the Taliban-Controlled government in Afghanistan, the Committee operated with a "two-track" approach. Firstly, the Committee dealt with the Taliban in the area around the Afghan-Pakistan border and their quest for conventional arms and ammunition. Secondly, the Committee dealt with the al-Qaeda cells located around the world and their attempt to acquire weapons of mass destruction.

The onus on implementing the Taliban element of the arms embargo imposed by Resolution 1390 lies primarily with Afghanistan and its six bordering states, i.e. China, Iran, Pakistan, Tajikistan, Turkmenistan and Uzbekistan. Focus was primarily on building capacity to monitor and stem the flow of weapons on the Afghan-Pakistan border.

==== Resolution 1988 ====
In 2011 the sanction regime 1267 (enforced in 2001, after the events of 9/11) aimed at the Taliban regime in Afghanistan, was divided into two separate sanction regimes. Sanction regime 1989 targets al-Qaeda specifically, whilst sanction regime 1988 targets the Taliban in Afghanistan. The new resolution included a separate list of Taliban individuals under sanctions. The reason for this modification was that Security Council took into consideration that some of the Taliban had ended their contacts with al-Qaeda, hence the need for separate sanction regimes. The type of sanctions applied for the new regime-1989 remained the same.

=== Effectiveness ===
The two goals of Resolution 1267 was to coerce the Taliban to hand over Osama bin Laden to US authorities to answer to criminal charges over the bombing of two US embassies in East Africa and to prevent the Taliban and al-Qaeda from conducting international acts of terror. The United Nations failed to coerce the Taliban-controlled Afghan government to hand over Osama bin Laden, who was killed in Pakistan in 2011 as a part of the US war effort in Afghanistan. The sanctions also failed to prevent al-Qaeda from conducting terrorist acts. In the years following the implementation of the sanctions, al-Qaeda claimed responsibility for the bombing of USS Cole in 2000 claiming the lives of seventeen American sailors and injured another 39. In addition to USS Cole, al-Qaeda claimed "direct responsibility" for the September 11 attacks, claiming the lives of 2,977 victims in New York City, Washington, DC and outside of Shanksville, Pennsylvania. The success of Resolution 1267 was limited due to the reliance on information provided by member states.

The goal of Resolution 1333 was to restrict the Taliban's access to conventional weapons and ammunition and other weapons of mass destruction. The success of Resolution 1333 was limited because of the reliance on information provided by member states to enable Committees to successfully monitor and enforce sanctions. Resolution 1333 relied on the ability of developing nations without the capability to enforce and report violations. The Committee sent the Sanctions Support Team in 2002. The sanctions support team, which was tasked with implementing the Arms Embargo along the Pakistan-Afghanistan border, was described as a small and "inadequate force" which was placed in the region following the September 11 terrorist attacks. The deployment of monitors was delayed and the arms embargo could not be fully implemented.

Resolution 1267 and subsequent United Nations Security Council Resolution, including 1333, have been credited with the promotion of international cooperation in combatting terrorism and strengthening anti-terrorism measures in intergovernmental organisation such as the Financial Action Task Force (FATF) and the International Monetary Fund (IMF). The mechanisms that were created to minimise the effectiveness of al-Qaeda are still in place and have been utilised by the United Nations to combat the Islamic State.

=== Lifting of UN sanctions ===
On January 15, 2002, the Security Council lifted its sanctions against Ariana Afghan Airlines. This was due to the new reality that the Afghan Airlines was no longer owned by or operated by the Taliban. Sanctions against the Da Afghanistan Bank were also lifted.

In the Security Council's Resolution 2255 (2015) the Council recognized that

"the security situation in Afghanistan has evolved and that some members of the Taliban have reconciled with the Government of Afghanistan, have rejected the terrorist ideology of Al-Qaeda and its followers, and support a peaceful resolution to the continuing conflict in Afghanistan"

And further, it was stated that the Security Council,

"Taking note of the Government of Afghanistan's request that the Security Council support reconciliation, including by removing names from the United Nations sanctions lists for those who reconcile and have ceased to engage in or support activities that threaten the peace, stability and security of Afghanistan,

Expressing its intention to give due regard to lifting sanctions on those who reconcile".

== Bilateral sanctions ==
=== EU sanctions ===
In accordance with the United Nations' sanction regime 1337, which was adopted after 9/11 2001, the European Union (EU) has as well implemented the sanction regime through various legal acts. A number of individuals and factions have been listed for freezing of assets. However, a full implementation of the 1337-regime by all the EU-member states collectively has not been possible. There is no EU regulation allowing the listing of asset freezing for individuals linked to terrorism originating from, and active within, the EU territory. A majority of the member states have however adopted national regulations which target these individuals.

In 2011, the European Union adopted the following restrictive measures against the Taliban (Council Decision 2011/486/CFSP):

- Embargo on arms and related material
- Ban on provision of certain services
- Freezing of funds and economic resources
- Restrictions on admission

==== Critique ====
Financial Action Task Force (FATF) is an intergovernmental organisation which has established 40 recommendations and functions as a "standard setter" to promote effective measures against money laundering and financing of terrorism, among other things. FATF evaluates its member states to guarantee the established recommendations are being followed. Regarding the implementation of resolution 1267 and the 1988/1989 sanction regimes, FATF has criticized the EU for too slow action regarding enforcement of the UN-listings of asset freezing. According to FATF's recommendations the member countries should implement economic sanctions settled by the UN, without impediment. Sweden is one of the countries that have been criticized, among other countries that lack national systems for these regulations.

One reason for the impediment from the decision on sanctions by the UN until it is implemented by the EU, is the need for translation. From the moment the list on sanctions is published in New York until the EU-decision is published in Brussels it take some days as the text in the resolution must be translated into the official EU-languages. This delay causes some issues as during the process of translation the listed individuals can freely withdraw money from banks within the EU.

=== US sanctions ===
President Clinton froze the Islamic Emirate of Taliban's assets under Executive Order No. 13129 on July 4, 1999. This was based on US findings that the Taliban had allowed Usama bin Laden and Al Qaeda to use Afghanistan as a base of operations from which acts of violence were planned and committed against the United States. The executive order was issued under the authority of the International Emergency Economic Powers Act (IEEPA), the National Emergencies Act and other relevant US laws.

In response to the 9/11 attacks in the United States, the US government launched an American-led military campaign declaring the Global War on Terror on September 11, 2001. As part of this campaign, President Bush issued Executive Order No. 13224 on September 23, 2001 "Blocking Property and Prohibiting Transactions With Persons Who Commit, Threaten To Commit, or Support Terrorism". The Executive Order was issued under the authority of the International Emergency Economic Powers Act, the National Emergencies Act, and other relevant US laws. In Executive Order No. 13224 the US government imposed financial sanctions on individuals and entities to combat the financing of terrorism.

President Bush lifted the state of national emergency in Executive Order No. 13268 on September 23, 2002, consequential to the US military invasion of Afghanistan in October 2001. The Executive Order underlines that the invasion was followed by a significant alteration of the situation concerning the Taliban and therefore the national emergency in the United States had diminished. In Executive Order No. 13268 the list of Executive Order No. 13224 was amended and Mullah Omar and the Taliban were added to the financial sanctions list.

==== After the Fall of Kabul (2021) ====
President Joe Biden froze the assets of the Da Afghanistan Bank held in the United States by United States financial institutions under Executive Order No. 14064 on February 11, 2022. The executive order was issued under the authority of the International Emergency Economic Powers Act (IEEPA), the National Emergencies Act, and the United States Code. The blockage of DAB properties is imposed due to the assertion of legal claims against the property of DAB, indicating that property could be related to terrorism.

===== Critique =====
The US sanctions on Afghan individuals, entities, and institutions for decades have complicated the reconstruction of the economic system in Afghanistan. The US presence in Afghanistan from 2001 to 2021 established a financial dependency of 75% on US assistance and foreign aid. As a consequence, when the US withdrew from Afghanistan on August 30, 2021, the Afghan economy collapsed. From December 2021, NGOs and news agencies reported the alarming signs of the early stages of widespread famine and the emergence of a humanitarian crisis. 97% of the country was exposed to the risk of falling below the poverty line of $1.90 a day in the middle of 2022. This was also partially due to the blockade of financial and humanitarian capital flow, which can be attributed considerably to the US sanctions and deterrence from the OFAC and its fines.

In response to the alarming predictions of a humanitarian disaster in Afghanistan, President Joe Biden issued a Fact Sheet on the Provision of Humanitarian Assistance to Afghanistan on April 13, 2022. In the Fact Sheet, the US government expressed its commitment to its support of the Afghan people and declared to invest 3.5 billion dollars of the frozen assets of Da Afghanistan Bank into foreign humanitarian aid directed to Afghanistan. This decision has been scrutinised, as several human rights agencies have insisted that personal financial assets belong and should be returned to the people of Afghanistan.

In addition to problems surrounding US sanctions and humanitarian aid, the sanctions imposed by the US seem to constrain most economic and financial projects in Afghanistan. The authors from "The Human Consequences of Economic Sanctions" exemplify that in August 2021, an Indian company tasked with constructing electric utility transmission lines suspended progress on its five projects within the country, asserting that the US had effectively halted all funding channels to Afghanistan. Moreover, trading companies active in Afghanistan and the Afghan people themselves have difficulties understanding the full nature of permissible contact with sanctioned persons. It is unclear whether commercial activities are perceived as relating to the Haqqani network. The regulations imposed by OFAC are considered ambiguous, which further cripples the reconstruction of the economy.

On January 1, 2023, The Washington Post on Middle Eastern Affairs states that US-led sanctions are the driving force behind mass starvation in Afghanistan.

== Effects on the Afghan people ==
=== Initial response ===
Widespread protests broke out in Afghanistan in November 1999, as the UN sanctions went into effect. Protesters attacked UN offices and vehicles. The Afghan national airline Ariana that transported medicine, food and health care providers to Afghanistan was grounded. Several NGOs withdrew their programmes as the level of insecurity in Afghanistan rose and due to the withdrawal of donors' support. At the time, NGOs represented approximately 70% of the provided health care services in Afghanistan. The sanctions aggravated the humanitarian crisis in the country, which had suffered from a war for more than twenty years.

In August 2000 the UN Office for the Coordination of Humanitarian Affairs (OCHA) reported that the existing sanctions had a "tangible negative effect" on Afghanistan's populace. Aid groups like MSF and Human Rights Watch together with the UN Secretary-General Kofi Annan and UN Afghanistan, criticized the decision for stricter sanctions against Afghanistan's ruling party in 2000, with regard to the humanitarian situation in the country.

The medical journal The Lancet reported in 2001 that the implementation of tougher UN sanctions on Afghanistan coincided with a period of drought in the country. According to a spokesperson for Médecins Sans Frontières (MSF) food had become so scarce many people resorted to eating plant roots. A spokesperson for the United Nations High Commissioner for Refugees (UNHCR) called the situation "a famine-like crisis".

=== After 2021 ===
After the Doha agreement was signed in February 2020, the U.S. troops withdrew from Afghanistan in August 2021. As a result of 20 years of foreign involvement in Afghanistan, it had become largely dependent on foreign aid and investments.

In the period following the withdrawal, problems associated with limited cash liquidity, caused by sanctions, boosted food and fuel costs. Meanwhile, unemployment surged due to the departure of humanitarian organizations. 22 million Afghans were measured to become food insecure and one million children were at risk for death in August 2022. In the Lancet, Representatives of Afghans for a Better Tomorrow showcased the subtlety of sanction consequences in their statement that "people are dying in their homes and nobody is counting those deaths".

Humanitarian aid is still primarily provided by Western actors. However, the flow of essential goods is consistently impeded due to the restrictions on capital flow as part of the international sanctions against Afghanistan. "In the setting of sanctions, when humanitarian aid is the only lifeline for this population, any deficits in the delivery of aid are deadly," says Meena Said, founder of Wellness Worldwide.

Afghanistan exemplifies the pattern where sanctions disproportionately harm civilians compared to their targeted leaders. Those in authority can manipulate the distribution of resources, often prioritizing their own interests over the well-being of civilians. The Taliban's misallocation of resources in a resource-scarce environment disproportionately impacts the most vulnerable and marginalized Afghans, specifically women and ethnic minorities.

Media conglomerate Al Jazeera conducted interviews with Afghan citizens after a destructive earthquake hit in June 2022. The earthquake survivors called for Western sanctions to be lifted in order to reduce their suffering and provide access to funds to rebuild houses, hospitals and school.

As of October 2025, Afghanistan is facing one of its most severe hunger crises. About 9.5 million people (about 21% of the population) are in "Crisis" or worse food-insecure phases between May and October. Meanwhile, the World Food Programme can now reach only around 1 million people monthly because of major funding shortfalls, leaving millions without emergency aid. The crisis is driven by collapsed economy, climate shocks, large returns of displaced people, and the drop in humanitarian assistance.

== 2024 Morality law on women and girls ==
The morality law on women and girls requires women and girls to cover their entire bodies and faces everywhere outside their homes and forbids their speaking in public, using public transportation alone, or even looking at men to whom they are not related by blood or marriage. It was made public on 21 August 2024 by the de facto Ministry for the Propagation of Virtue and Prevention of Vice. This law further excluded Afghanistan from the international community with many of Taliban de facto ministers under sanctions and travel bans.

Following this law, authorities of many countries, like the UK, Slovenia, Ecuador, and more voiced their condemnation of the so-called "vice and virtue" law issued by the Taliban. With Ecuador's delegate saying that it is "impossible to talk about national unity and reconciliation when women and girls, half of the Afghan population, are marginalized and rendered invisible".

The European Parliament with its resolution of 19 September 2024 condemns the Taliban's enforcement of Sharia law, the erasure of women and girls from public life, their being forced into unwanted and early marriages and exposed to sexual violence, and the reintroduction of the public flogging and stoning to death of women. It also urges Afghanistan's de facto authorities to abolish their practices and laws discriminating against women; calls for the immediate restoration of women's and girls' full, equal, meaningful participation in public life.

The Afghan economy will lose 5 per cent of gross domestic product (GDP) annually by excluding women from the workforce, and the equivalent of two thirds of today's GDP by 2066 if the suspension of women's access to higher education remains in place.

== Hawala and sanctions ==
The near-famine crisis mid 2022 was averted due to remittances transferred through the historic Hawala system, the informal currency exchange that originates from the Asian continent. Nowadays, its network stretches out globally. The Hawala system facilitated the majority of economic activity in Afghanistan since the imposition of the sanctions blocked most formal financial transactions. The exact magnitude of the remittances remains unknown, but is speculated to have contributed considerably to warding off a full-scale famine.

== Controversies ==
=== Disregard for human rights ===
As the sanctions were modified to target individuals, concerns about the "interference with the fundamental rights" of the listed individuals were raised. The freezing of assets denied access to private individual funds that provide for basic expenses. The nature of the sanctions lacked a definite end-date. Without an end-date the sanctions could be regarded as "punitive" rather than "preventative" without the legal protections that are provided under international criminal laws.

Individuals were placed on the consolidated list at the suggestion of United Nations member states. These suggestions were accepted on the basis of "political trust," rather than "credible information" regarding personal connections to the Taliban, bin Laden or al-Qaeda. Another controversy was that an individual could be placed on the list on the suggestion of a single state, whilst a consensus of all committee members was needed for the individual to be removed.

=== Right to due process ===
One of the major controversies following Resolution 1267 and subsequent resolutions was the United Nations Security Council disregard for international recognised standards of due process. The committee lacked guidelines and procedures for placing individuals on the consolidated list, which blacklisted them for access to personal monetary funds. There was also no mechanisms for individuals to be informed of their listing, to know the allegations against them, or challenge their listing.

After much criticism against the UN sanctions procedures, member states made efforts to improve procedures and increase transparency. For instance, improvements of the listing and delisting process followed. With resolution 1730 (2006) the Focal Point for Delisting was added, where listed individuals are able to contact the governments that had listed them, and request to be "delisted". Previously there was no such mechanism available.

=== Comprehensive sanctioning ===
Since the Taliban took control over Kabul in August 2021, it can be considered the de facto government of Afghanistan. As a consequence, the "smart sanctions" regime targeted at Taliban affiliated individuals transformed into a comprehensive sanctioning regime.

Various scholars have argued that the era of comprehensive sanctioning was finished after the catastrophic sanctions imposed on Iraq during the 1990s, to mitigate the harms inflicted on the general population while isolating individuals or groups. Governments turned away from destructive comprehensive sanctioning and embraced this new strategy, as the consequences of the sanctions would supposedly not impact the entire population, but only the targeted individuals.

On the other hand, the UN, EU and US remain to deny the Taliban acknowledgement as the de facto government since the Taliban seized Kabul. Accordingly, the OFAC explicitly states on its website that it does not impose comprehensive sanctions on Afghanistan, because it does not recognize the Taliban as the official government. This contradiction displays controversy surrounding the subjective definitions that are accounted to sanctions in the context of Afghanistan, and its differentiating intentions and objectives underlying the policy.

== Future of sanctions ==
The Quincy Institute for Responsible Statecraft has discussed the probability of Afghanistan becoming self-sufficient from the global economic system, consequently to the sanctions. According to Graeme Smith, ICS, the Taliban are only interested in economic recovery based on their terms.

Others discuss the prospect of 'Lebanization' of the conflict: the tacit acknowledgement by key players in the conflict that the nation is temporarily partitioned into cantons, with a somewhat balanced distribution of power.

The International Crisis Group has published a set of recommendations in regards to the international sanctions of the West against Afghanistan, which is primarily focused on benefitting Afghan women and rebuilding and maintaining cautious engagement with the Taliban. It concludes:

If the international system can find a liminal space between pariah and legitimate status that allows Afghanistan to keep functioning, it would undermine the Taliban's overheated rhetoric about a titanic clash between Islam and the West.
