= United Nations Security Council Resolution 1989 =

UN Security Council Resolution 1989
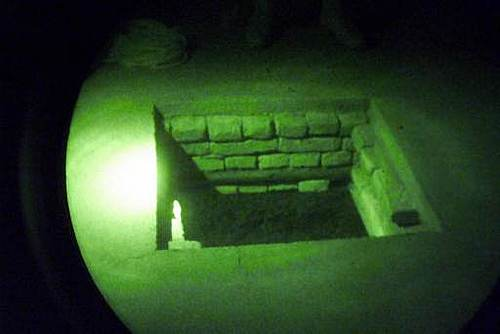
- Alleged Al-Qaeda tunnel in Afghanistan
- Date: 17 June 2011
- Meeting no.: 6,557
- Code: S/RES/1989 (Document)
- Subject: Threats to international peace and security caused by terrorist acts
- Voting summary: 15 voted for; None voted against; None abstained
- Result: Adopted

Security Council composition
- Permanent members: China; France; Russia; United Kingdom; United States
- Non-permanent members: Bosnia–Herzegovina; Brazil; Colombia; Germany; Gabon; India; Lebanon; Nigeria; Portugal; South Africa

United Nations Security Council Resolution 1989, adopted unanimously on June 17, 2011, after recalling resolutions 1267 (1999), 1333 (2000), 1363 (2001), 1373 (2001), 1390 (2002), 1452 (2002), 1455 (2003), 1526 (2004), 1566 (2004), 1617 (2005), 1624 (2005), 1699 (2006), 1730 (2006), 1735 (2006), 1822 (2008), 1904 (2009) and 1988 (2011) on terrorism and the threat to Afghanistan, the Council imposed separate sanctions regimes on Al-Qaeda and the Taliban.

Resolution 1989 dealt with sanctions relating to Al-Qaeda, while Resolution 1988 (2011) addressed sanctions against the Taliban. Until the passing of both the resolutions, sanctions on the Taliban and Al-Qaeda had been handled by the same committee.

== Details ==
The Security Council reaffirmed that terrorism continued to constitute a "serious" threat to international peace and security. The provisions of the resolution, adopted under Chapter VII of the United Nations Charter, included;

- Modified the Committee established in Resolution 1267 to include only Al-Qaeda and associates;
- Expanded the mandate of the Ombudsperson created in Resolution 1904 to include the consideration of requests for delisting and the acceptance or rejection of requests;
- Urged states and organisations to provide all necessary information concerning delisting requests for Al-Qaeda or other individuals;
- Ensured that the sanctions were more fairly and transparently applied.

The annex of the resolution provided instructions for the Ombudsperson and Monitoring Committee.

== See also ==
- Al-Qaida and Taliban Sanctions Committee
- List of United Nations Security Council Resolutions 1901 to 2000 (2009 – 2011)
- Terrorism
