= United Nations Security Council Resolution 1988 =

2011 resolution imposing sanctions on the Taliban

UN Security Council Resolution 1988
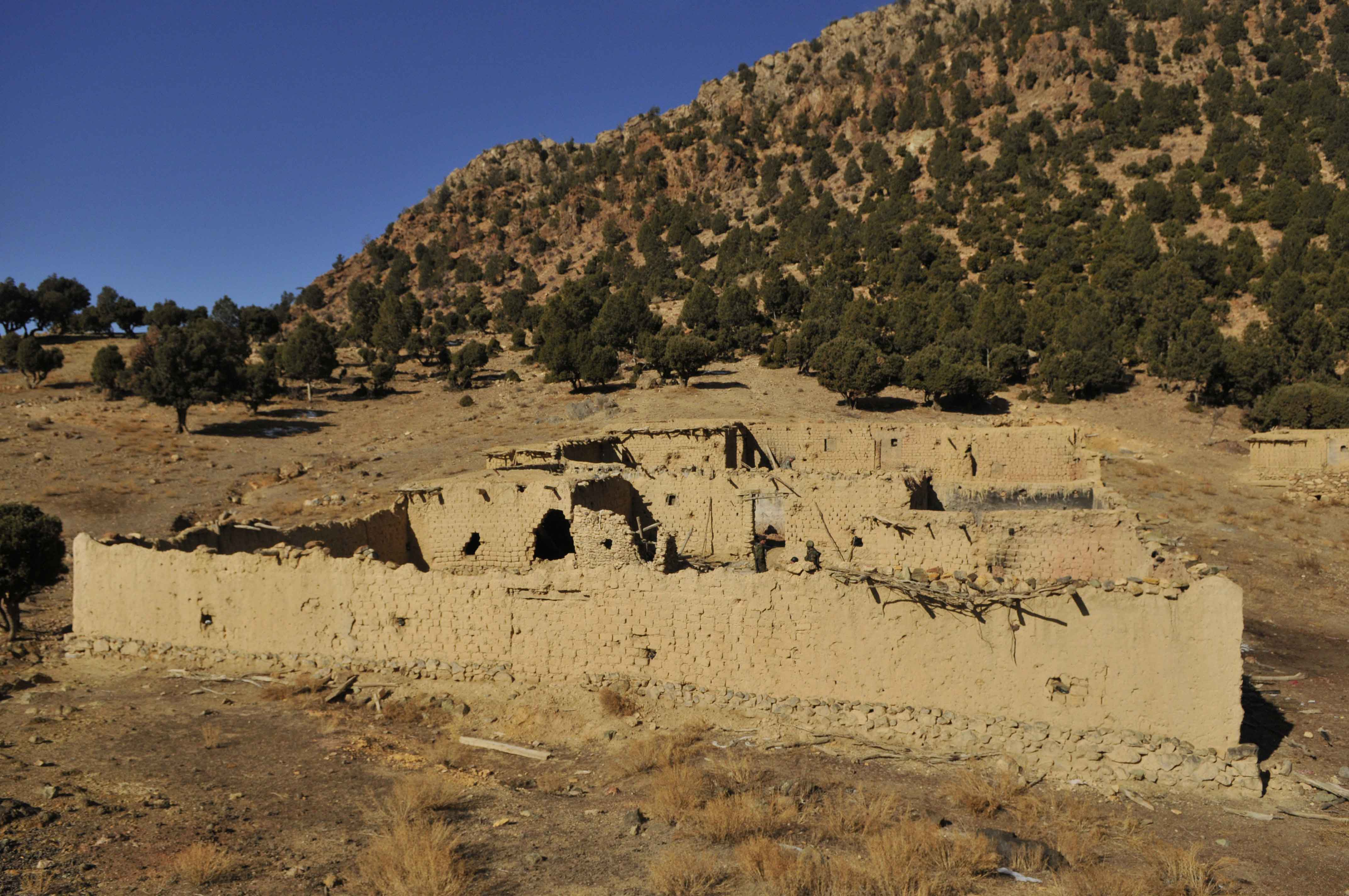
- A former Taliban safe house in Afghanistan
- Date: 17 June 2011
- Meeting no.: 6,557
- Code: S/RES/1988 (Document)
- Subject: Threats to international peace and security caused by terrorist acts
- Voting summary: 15 voted for; None voted against; None abstained
- Result: Adopted

Security Council composition
- Permanent members: China; France; Russia; United Kingdom; United States
- Non-permanent members: Bosnia–Herzegovina; Brazil; Colombia; Germany; Gabon; India; Lebanon; Nigeria; Portugal; South Africa

United Nations Security Council Resolution 1988, adopted unanimously on June 17, 2011, after recalling resolutions 1267 (1999), 1333 (2000), 1363 (2001), 1373 (2001), 1390 (2002), 1452 (2002), 1455 (2003), 1526 (2004), 1566 (2004), 1617 (2005), 1624 (2005), 1699 (2006), 1730 (2006), 1735 (2006), 1822 (2008) and 1904 (2009) on terrorism and the threat to Afghanistan, the Council imposed separate sanctions regimes on Al-Qaeda and the Taliban.

Resolution 1988 dealt with sanctions relating to the Taliban, while Resolution 1989 (2011) addressed sanctions on Al-Qaeda. Until the passing of both the resolutions, sanctions on the Taliban and Al-Qaeda had been handled by the same committee.

== Details ==
The Security Council reaffirmed that the situation in Afghanistan continued to constitute a threat to international peace and security. The provisions of the resolution, adopted under Chapter VII of the United Nations Charter, included;

- A new sanctions regime targeting the Taliban and associates;
- Afghan-Taliban individuals listed under the list of sanctioned individuals created after Resolution 1267 were moved to the new sanctions list created by the current resolution;
- A new "Afghanistan Sanctions Committee" was established to oversee the implementation of the sanctions;
- The new Committee was to lift sanctions against former Taliban members who had renounced violence and joined the reconciliation process;
- The Afghan government was to send a list to the Committee of individuals it felt could be delisted;
- The new sanctions regime was to be transparent and sanctions had to be enforced fairly.

The annex of the resolution provided instructions for the new Committee.

== See also ==
- Al-Qaida and Taliban Sanctions Committee
- List of United Nations Security Council Resolutions 1901 to 2000 (2009 – 2011)
- Terrorism
