= United Nations Security Council Resolution 1735 =

UN Security Council Resolution 1735
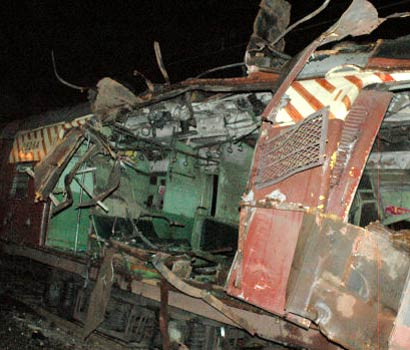
- Aftermath of 11 July 2006 Mumbai train bombings
- Date: 22 December 2006
- Meeting no.: 5,609
- Code: S/RES/1735 (Document)
- Subject: Threats to international peace and security caused by terrorist acts
- Voting summary: 15 voted for; None voted against; None abstained
- Result: Adopted

Security Council composition
- Permanent members: China; France; Russia; United Kingdom; United States
- Non-permanent members: Argentina; Rep. of the Congo; Denmark; Ghana; Greece; Japan; Peru; Qatar; Slovakia; Tanzania

United Nations Security Council Resolution 1735, adopted unanimously on December 22, 2006, after recalling resolutions 1267 (1999), 1333 (2000), 1363 (2001), 1373 (2001), 1390 (2001), 1452 (2002), 1455 (2003), 1526 (2004), 1566 (2004), 1617 (2005), 1624 (2005) and 1699 (2005) on terrorism, the Council approved measures to improve the identification and control of terrorists.

== Resolution ==
=== Observations ===
The Security Council viewed terrorism as one of the greatest threats to international peace and security. It condemned and expressed concern at the increasing number of attacks by Al-Qaeda, Osama bin Laden, the Taliban and other individuals and groups. Council members reaffirmed that terrorism could be defeated only through a comprehensive approach with the active participation and co-operation of all countries and international organisations; in this context, dialogue between the 1267 Committee and states was important, and co-operation with Interpol was welcomed.

Meanwhile, the preamble of the resolution also expressed concern at misuse of the Internet by terrorist groups and individuals, further noting the changing nature of the threat, particularly in the way terrorists would promote their ideologies.

=== Acts ===
The following measures were enacted under Chapter VII of the United Nations Charter, thus making the measures legal under international law.

All countries were required to impose an arms embargo, travel ban and financial sanctions against all terrorist groups and individuals. Furthermore, countries could propose names for listing on a sanctions list and had to use the form provided in the annex of the resolution. The 1267 Committee was asked to develop, adopt and implement guidelines regarding individuals to be removed from the list.

The resolution went on to detail procedures for implementing the measures, taking note of exemptions, co-operation and the exchange of information, sanctions on the Taliban and outreach. The mandate of the monitoring team based in New York City was extended for a further period of 18 months; its responsibilities were outlined in the annex of the resolution, including dealing with instances of non-compliance.

== See also ==
- Counter-Terrorism Committee
- Interpol notice
- List of United Nations Security Council Resolutions 1701 to 1800 (2006–2008)
