= ISIL (Da'esh) and Al-Qaida Sanctions Committee =

United Nations Security Council committee

The ISIL (Da'esh) and Al-Qaida Sanctions Committee (Note: Officially known as the Security Council Committee pursuant to resolutions 1267 (1999), 1989 (2011) and 2253 (2015) concerning Islamic State in Iraq and the Levant (Da'esh), Al-Qaida and associated individuals, groups, undertakings and entities) is a committee of the United Nations Security Council tasked with implementing international sanctions against the Islamic State and al-Qaeda. It was established as the Al-Qaida and Taliban Sanctions Committee on 15 October 1999, pursuant to Security Council Resolution 1267, which designated al-Qaeda and the Taliban as terrorist organizations. Following the creation of a separate Taliban Sanctions Committee on 17 June 2011, it was renamed the Al-Qaida Sanctions Committee. The scope of the sanctions regime was expanded to include the Islamic State on 17 December 2015 pursuant to Resolution 2253.

The committee is one of three Security Council committees dealing with counter-terrorism. The other two committees are the Counter-Terrorism Committee established pursuant to Security Council Resolution 1373 (2001), and the Security Council Committee established pursuant to Resolution 1540 (2004).

Resolution 1267 (1999) and subsequent resolutions have all been adopted under Chapter VII of the United Nations Charter and require all UN member states to inter alia "freeze the assets of, prevent the entry into or transit through their territories by, and prevent the direct or indirect supply, sale and transfer of arms and military equipment to any individual or entity associated with Al-Qaida, Osama bin Laden and/or the Taliban as designated by the Committee".

On 17 June 2011, Resolution 1989 was adopted, so that the sanctions measures now apply to designated individuals and entities associated solely with al-Qaeda. On this same date, Resolution 1988 was adopted, creating a new committee dealing exclusively with sanctions relating to the Taliban.

The Al-Qaida Sanctions Committee, like other Security Council committees, is composed of representatives of the 15 members of the United Nations Security Council. These are the five permanent members, China, France, the Russian Federation, the United Kingdom and the United States, and ten other rotating members. Vanessa Frazier, the Permanent Representative of Malta to the United Nations, was appointed Chair of the committee. The two Vice-Chairs are from the United Arab Emirates and the Russian Federation. Chair positions do not carry extraordinary decision-making power, as the Committee takes all its decisions by consensus.

Upon the adoption of Resolution 1267 (1999), the Committee lacked a chairperson, and its first and only meeting held in 1999 was chaired by the then President of the United Nations Security Council, Jeremy Greenstock of the United Kingdom. The first Chairman of the committee was ambassador Arnoldo Listre of Argentina, who held the post until the end of 2000. The post was subsequently held by the Ambassadors of Colombia (2001–2002), Chile (2003–2004), Argentina (2005–2006), Belgium (2007–2008), Austria (2009–2010), and Germany (2011-2012).

== Resolutions ==
The Al-Qaida sanctions regime has been modified and strengthened by a number of subsequent resolutions.

The following paragraphs summarize the relevant Security Council resolutions which have served in the strengthening of the 1267 (now Al-Qaida) sanctions regime:

- Resolution 1267 (1999) adopted on 15 October 1999 established the 1267 Committee and imposed amongst other things, financial sanctions on the Taliban.
- Resolution 1333 (2000) adopted on 19 December 2000 added a 12-month arms embargo over the territory of Afghanistan under Taliban control and expanded the financial sanctions to cover Osama bin Laden and Al-Qaida.
- Resolution 1390 (2002) adopted on 16 January 2002 added the travel ban, removed the time limit on the arms and financial sanctions over Osama bin Laden and Al-Qaida, expanded all three sanctions measures beyond the territory of Afghanistan and established the Consolidated List.
- Resolution 1452 (2002) adopted on 20 December 2002 provided humanitarian exemptions to the assets freeze.
- Resolution 1455 (2003) adopted on 17 January 2003 called for implementation reports from all States.
- Resolution 1526 (2004) adopted on 30 January 2004 strengthened the committee's mandate, established the Monitoring Team, provided for wider dissemination of the Consolidated List to International Regional Organizations (IROs) for inclusion of listed names in their respective electronic databases and relevant border enforcement and entry/exit tracking systems, encouraged relevant IROs to become more directly involved in capacity-building efforts, and offered technical assistance in areas identified by the committee, in consultation with the Counter Terrorism Committee.
- Resolution 1617 (2005) adopted on 29 July 2005 provided the "associated with" criteria, statements of case for listing, checklist reporting and welcomed the efforts of the International Civil Aviation Organization (ICAO) to prevent travel documents from being made available to terrorists and their associates, and encouraged Member States to work in the framework of INTERPOL, in particular through the use of the INTERPOL database of stolen and lost travel documents.
- Resolution 1699 (2006) adopted on 8 August 2006 requested the Secretary-General to take the necessary steps to increase cooperation between the United Nations and INTERPOL in order to provide all the other Security Council Sanctions Committees with better tools to implement the measures adopted by the Security Council.
- Resolution 1730 (2006) adopted on 19 December 2006 established what was known as a Focal Point for de-listing requests for all sanctions committees. This resolution was superseded, insofar as it pertained to the Al-Qaeda/Taliban Sanctions Committee, by the establishment of the Office of the Ombudsperson pursuant to Resolution 1904 (2009).
- Resolution 1735 (2006) adopted on 22 December 2006 extended the decision-making time for asset freeze exemptions, provided a cover sheet for listing submissions, highlighted the arms embargo explanation of terms, suggested publicly releasable statements of case, established a notification process to listed parties, highlighted listing and de-listing issues, requested the Secretary-General to take necessary steps to increase cooperation between the UN and relevant organizations such as INTERPOL, ICAO, IATA and WCO to provide the Committee and Member States with better tools.
- Resolution 1822 (2008) adopted on 30 June 2008 reaffirmed the acts and activities regarding the "associated with" criteria eligibility for listing, requested States to identify publicly releasable statements of case, directed the committee to make narrative summaries of reasons for listing for all names accessible on the committee's website and other initiatives on listing and de-listing, and also directed the committee to conduct a comprehensive review of all names on the List as at 30 June 2008 (488 names) by 30 June 2010. It encouraged the committee to continue to ensure that fair and clear procedures exist for listing and de-listing, encouraged cooperation with INTERPOL and UNODC.
- Resolution 1904 (2009) adopted on 17 December 2009 added to the review process pursuant to resolution 1822 (2008), directed the committee to conduct reviews of deceased persons who may be on the list and listings lacking identifiers for effective implementation, and enhanced information sharing and transparency including by introducing new procedures for dealing with pending issues. It further shortened the notification period for listing or de-listing to three days and established the Office of the Ombudsperson to assist the Committee in the consideration of de-listing requests.
- Resolutions 1988 and 1989 (2011) adopted on 17 June 2011 split the functions of the original 1267 Committee so that the Al-Qaida Sanctions Committee would deal with sanctions relating to Al-Qaida, and the new 1988 Committee would deal with sanctions relating to the Taliban.
- By the terms of United Nations Security Council Resolution 2083, adopted unanimously on 17 December 2012, the Council further detailed the criteria for designation as an individual or entity associated with Al-Qaida and subject to an asset freeze, travel ban and arms embargo. It also extended for 30 months the mandate of the Office of the Ombudsperson established by resolution 1904 (2009) to handle delisting requests and improve the regime's transparency and fairness.

== Al-Qaida Sanctions List (previously known as the Consolidated List) ==
Pursuant to resolution 1390 (2002) the committee established and maintains a list which serves as the foundation for the implementation and enforcement of the sanctions measures imposed against those individuals and entities associated with Al-Qaeda as designated by the committee. The list is split into two sections covering: A. individuals associated with Al-Qaeda and B. entities and other groups and undertakings associated with Al-Qaeda.

The List, whose count changes frequently due to listings and de-listings, contains 345 individuals and entities (as of 2 May 2019) against whom three sanctions measures: (1) assets freeze, (2) travel ban, and (3) arms embargo, must be applied by all Member States. The Committee oversees the implementation of these three sanctions measures, considers names submitted for listing and de-listing, as well as any additional information on the listed individuals and entities.

According to the committee's website, the list as of 2 May 2019 currently consists of:

- 262 Individuals associated with Al-Qaida
- 83 Entities and other groups and undertakings associated with Al-Qaida

In accordance with paragraph 14 of resolution 1904 (2009), the committee has made accessible Narrative Summaries of the reasons for listing for most of the names on the List.

== Monitoring Team ==
The Al-Qaida Sanctions Committee is assisted by a Monitoring Team of eight experts based in New York supported by a team of professional UN staff. The Team have expertise on Al-Qaida and associates, the Taliban, counter-terrorism legislation, terrorist financing, border security and arms embargoes. The Monitoring Team was established by Security Council resolution 1526 (2004) and extended by subsequent resolutions.

In the summer of 2014 it was also given two new specific mandates. The first was to prepare a report analyzing the threat from the Islamic State in Iraq and the Levant (ISIL) and al-Nusra Front (ANF), coming up with recommendations for actions by the Security Council. This was mandated in Security Council resolution 2170. The second was to report on foreign terrorist fighters, recommending potential responses, mandated in Security Council resolution 2178.

The Monitoring Team assists the Committee in evaluating the implementation of the sanctions regime by Member States, conducting on-the-ground analysis, reporting on developments that may affect the effectiveness of the sanctions regime as well as the changing nature of the threat posed by Al-Qaida. The Team also assists the Committee in working with Member States to update, and maintain the accuracy of, the Al-Qaida Sanctions List and assists the Committee in its conduct of all the reviews mandated by the Security Council. The team publishes periodic public reports on the nature of the threat along with recommendations for the committee.

The Monitoring Team is also part of the United Nations Counter-Terrorism Implementation Task Force which assists Member States in the implementation of the United Nations Global Counter-Terrorism Strategy.

== List of persons ==
- Abu Bakr al-Baghdadi was the leader of the international terrorist organization Islamic State
- Abu Mohammad al-Adnani was the official spokesperson and chief media representative of the international terrorist organization "Islamic State"
- Osama bin Laden was the founder and first leader (emir) of the international terrorist organization Al-Qaeda
- Hamza bin Laden was the leader of the international terrorist organization Al-Qaeda
- Ayman al-Zawahiri was a leader of Al-Qaeda
- Saja Hamid al-Dulaimi was the wife of ISIS leader Abu Bakr al-Baghdadi
- Asма Fawzi Mohammed al-Kubaissi was the wife of ISIS leader Abu Bakr al-Baghdadi
- Umm Hudhayfa was the wife of ISIS leader Abu Bakr al-Baghdadi
- Saif al-Adel leader of Al-Qaeda following the death of Ayman al-Zawahiri in 2022
- Abu Omar al-Shishani was one of the top military leaders and the "war minister" of the terrorist group Islamic State
- Akhmed Chatayev was one of the leaders and senior commanders of the terrorist group "Islamic State"
- Ahmed al-Sharaa excluded from the sanctions and terrorism lists.
- Shahab al-Muhajir was one of the leaders Islamic State – Khorasan Province
- Abu Nuradin Rustamov was one of the leaders Islamic State
- Abu Musab al-Zarqawi was the leader of the Al-Qaeda in Iraq group.

== Office of the Ombudsperson ==
The Office of the Ombudsperson of the 1267 Committee was established to serve as an independent and impartial intermediary, who reviews requests from individuals, groups, undertakings or entities seeking to be removed from the Al-Qaida Sanctions List of the committee.

Upon establishing the Office through Security Council resolution 1904 (2009), the United Nations issued a press release stating that the individual serving as the Ombudsperson should be "an eminent individual of high moral character, impartiality and integrity with high qualifications and experience in relevant fields, such as legal, human rights, counter-terrorism and sanctions". The full responsibilities of the Ombudsperson's Office are set out in Annex II of the resolution.

The first and current Ombudsperson for the Al-Qaida Committee is Judge Kimberly Prost, who was appointed by the Secretary-General on 3 June 2010. Before her appointment, Judge Prost served in a number of positions both at the United Nations and the Canadian Department of Justice, and served as an ad litem judge of the International Criminal Tribunal for the former Yugoslavia from July 2006 to June 2010. The Office of the Ombudsperson is based at the United Nations Headquarters in New York.
