= United Nations Security Council Resolution 1617 =

UN Security Council Resolution 1617
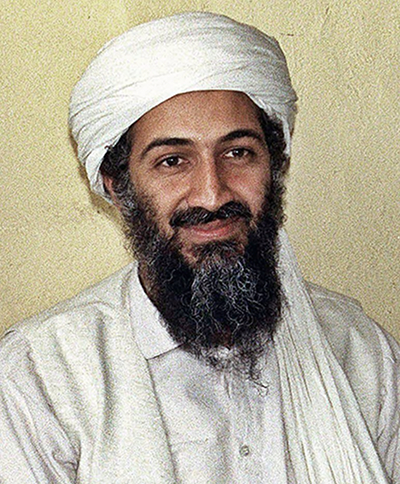
- Osama bin Laden
- Date: 29 July 2005
- Meeting no.: 5,244
- Code: S/RES/1617 (Document)
- Subject: Threats to international peace and security caused by terrorist acts
- Voting summary: 15 voted for; None voted against; None abstained
- Result: Adopted

Security Council composition
- Permanent members: China; France; Russia; United Kingdom; United States
- Non-permanent members: Algeria; Argentina; Benin; Brazil; Denmark; Greece; Japan; Philippines; Romania; Tanzania

United Nations Security Council resolution 1617, adopted unanimously on 29 July 2005, after recalling resolutions 1267 (1999), 1333 (2000), 1363 (2001), 1373 (2001), 1390 (2001), 1452 (2002), 1455 (2003), 1526 (2004) and 1566 (2004) concerning terrorism, the Council renewed sanctions against Al-Qaeda, the Taliban, Osama bin Laden and associated individuals and groups for a further seventeen months.

The resolution, drafted by the United States, defined the terms of being "associated with" Al-Qaeda, the Taliban and Osama bin Laden.

== Resolution ==
=== Observations ===
In the preamble of the resolution, the Council determined that terrorism posed a serious threat to international peace and security. It condemned Al-Qaeda and other associated groups for ongoing terrorist attacks and reiterated its overall condemnation of all terrorist acts. There was concern at the use of media – including the Internet – by the groups to incite terrorist violence and disseminate propaganda.

The Council urged all states to implement Resolution 1373 and reaffirmed the need to combat terrorism. It stressed the importance of individuals and entities being listed subject to the nature of Al-Qaeda. The International Civil Aviation Organization (ICAO) was preventing travel documents from being made available to terrorists, and the Council encouraged states to work with Interpol. Furthermore, there was concern at the use of man-portable air-defense systems by Al-Qaeda, the Taliban, Osama bin Laden and associate groups.

=== Acts ===
Acting under Chapter VII of the United Nations Charter, the Council urged states to continue sanctions against Al-Qaeda, the Taliban, Osama bin Laden and associate groups. The sanctions included a freezing of assets, a travel ban and the prevention of the sale of weapons. It also defined the nature of entities to be "associated with" Al-Qaeda, the Taliban, Osama bin Laden.

The resolution then addressed the role of the Al-Qaida and Taliban Sanctions Committee and its subsidiary, the monitoring team, in dealing with terrorist suspects and groups. Measures included a checklist in order for states to fulfill their obligations to the committee, and for states forwarding names to the list to use a "statement of case" describing the reasoning behind the request.

The tasks of the monitoring team, whose mandate was extended by 17 months, were listed in the annex of the resolution.

== See also ==
- Anti-terrorism legislation
- Counter-terrorism
- List of terrorist incidents
- List of United Nations Security Council Resolutions 1601 to 1700 (2005–2006)
- Terrorist financing
- United Nations Security Council Counter-Terrorism Committee
