= United Nations Security Council Resolution 1456 =

UN Security Council Resolution 1456
- Date: 20 January 2003
- Meeting no.: 4,688
- Code: S/RES/1456 (Document)
- Subject: High-level meeting of the Security Council: combating terrorism
- Voting summary: 15 voted for; None voted against; None abstained
- Result: Adopted

Security Council composition
- Permanent members: China; France; Russia; United Kingdom; United States
- Non-permanent members: Angola; Bulgaria; Chile; Cameroon; Germany; Guinea; Mexico; Pakistan; Spain; Syria

United Nations Security Council resolution 1456, adopted unanimously on 20 January 2003 in a meeting at the foreign minister level, the council adopted a declaration calling on all states to prevent and suppress all support for terrorism. The resolution did not define terrorism, but unlike other previous resolutions, mentioned human rights for the first time.

The Security Council reaffirmed that terrorism constituted one of the greatest threats to international peace and security, and was unjustifiable irrespective of the motivation. There was growing concern that nuclear, chemical or biological weapons would be used and sophisticated technology exploited. In this regard, measures to prevent the financing of terrorism had to be strengthened and terrorists had to be prevented from making use of drug trafficking, money laundering, arms trafficking and other crimes. Furthermore, it highlighted the council's determination to combat such acts through a comprehensive approach involving all nations and organisations in accordance with the United Nations Charter and international law.

All states had to comply with resolutions 1373 (2001), 1390 (2002) and 1455 (2003), become party to international conventions on terrorism, assist in terrorist investigations and implement sanctions against Al-Qaeda, the Taliban and their associates reflected in resolutions 1267 (1999), 1390 and 1455. The council also required that all states bring those who perpetrate, support, finance or plan terrorist actions to justice and to co-operate with the Counter-Terrorism Committee.

The adopted declaration also stated that measures taken to combat terrorism had to comply with international law, particularly international humanitarian, human rights and refugee law. Meanwhile, international organisations were to evaluate ways of improving the effectiveness of their actions against terrorism. The Council emphasised efforts to broaden understanding among civilizations and enhance dialogue to prevent the targeting of religions and cultures, concluding by stating its determination to intensify the fight against terrorism.

== See also ==
- Anti-terrorism legislation
- Counter-terrorism
- List of United Nations Security Council Resolutions 1401 to 1500 (2002–2003)
- Terrorist financing
