= United Nations Security Council Resolution 1214 =

UN Security Council Resolution 1214
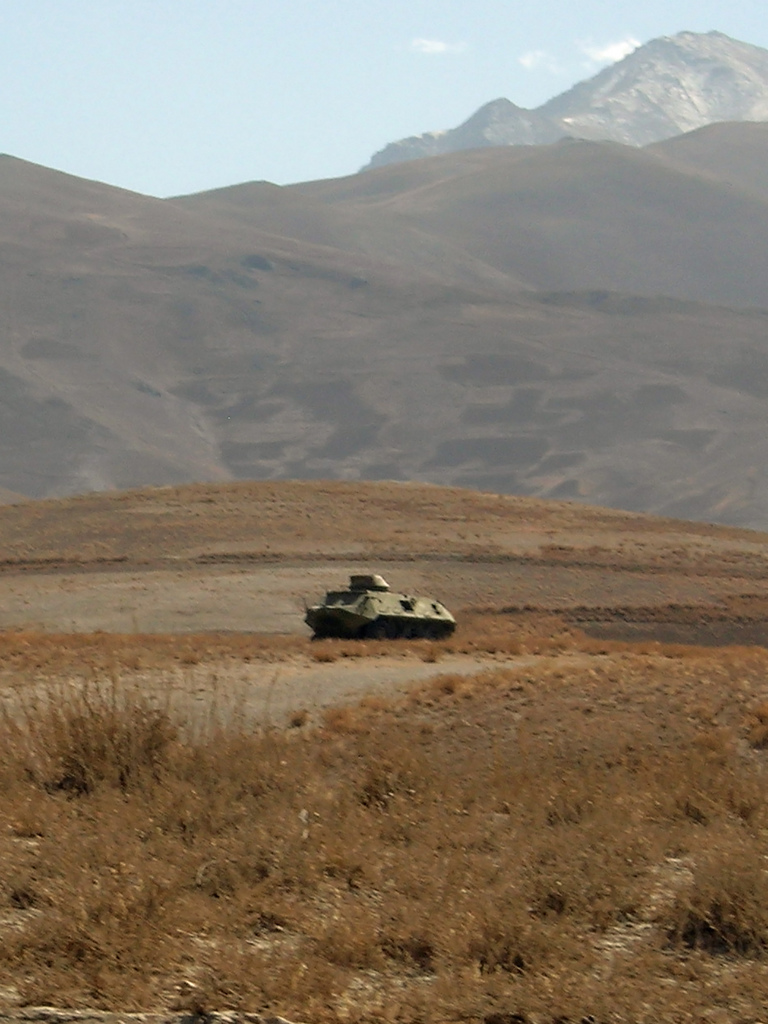
- Taliban tank
- Date: 8 December 1998
- Meeting no.: 3,952
- Code: S/RES/1214 (Document)
- Subject: The situation in Afghanistan
- Voting summary: 15 voted for; None voted against; None abstained
- Result: Adopted

Security Council composition
- Permanent members: China; France; Russia; United Kingdom; United States
- Non-permanent members: Bahrain; Brazil; Costa Rica; Gabon; Gambia; Japan; Kenya; Portugal; Slovenia; Sweden

United Nations Security Council resolution 1214, adopted unanimously on 8 December 1998, after recalling resolutions 1189 (1998) and 1193 (1998) concerning Afghanistan, the Council discussed the deteriorating political, military and humanitarian situation in Afghanistan and established a civil affairs unit as part of the United Nations Special Mission to Afghanistan (UNSMA).

The Security Council expressed concern at the escalation of the Afghan conflict due to an offensive by the Taliban, causing a threat to international peace and security, destruction to property and the displacement of large numbers of people and refugees. It was also concerned at the increasingly ethnic and religious nature of the conflict, particularly against the Shiites. The United Front of Afghanistan wished to conclude a ceasefire with the Taliban, however there was continuing violence on both sides. Any outside interference in the country had to cease immediately.

The Council remained concerned at the deteriorating humanitarian situation in the country and reminded all Afghan factions of their obligations under the Geneva Conventions. There was concern at the presence of terrorists in areas controlled by the Taliban, drug trafficking and discrimination against women and girls.

The resolution demanded that the Taliban stopped fighting, conclude a ceasefire and resume negotiations without preconditions. The Taliban were called upon to inform the United Nations about results into an investigation into the deaths of two United Nations personnel World Food Programme and of the United Nations High Commissioner for Refugees in Jalalabad and the military adviser to UNSMA in Kabul. It also condemned the kidnapping of the Iranian consulate-general, the killing of Iranian diplomats and of a journalist in Mazar-i-Sharif.

The Secretary-General Kofi Annan was asked to send a mission to investigate allegations of serious human rights violations such as massacres of prisoners of war and civilians in addition to the destruction of religious sites. It encouraged further diplomatic efforts as part of the peace process, including the "six plus two" group and the international community. Finally, the Afghan factions, particularly the Taliban, were urged to end the discrimination against girls and women, to respect human rights, to cease supporting terrorists and halt illegal drug activities. The council would consider the imposition of further measures if the Taliban continued to defy previous security council resolutions.

== See also ==
- War in Afghanistan (1978–present)
- Civil war in Afghanistan (1992–1996)
- Civil war in Afghanistan (1996–2001)
- Human rights in Afghanistan
- List of United Nations Security Council Resolutions 1201 to 1300 (1998–2000)
