= United Nations Security Council Resolution 1450 =

UN Security Council Resolution 1450
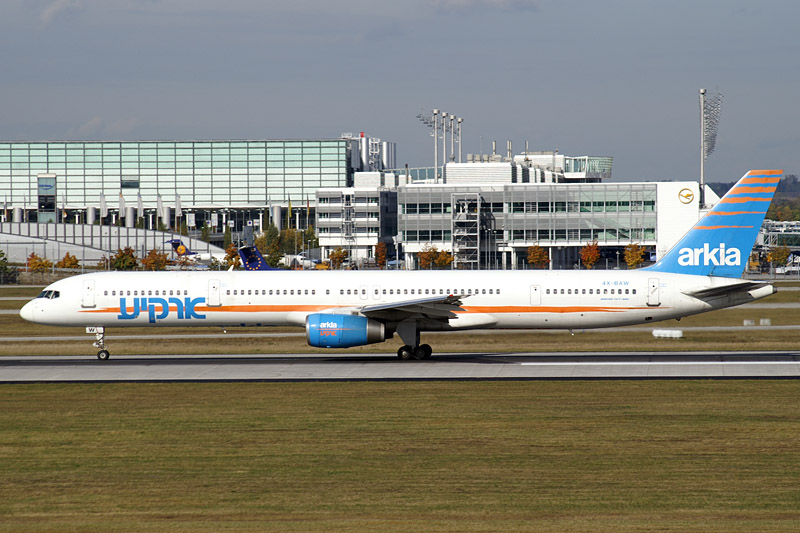
- Arkia Israel Airlines plane
- Date: 13 December 2002
- Meeting no.: 4,667
- Code: S/RES/1450 (Document)
- Subject: Threats to international peace and security caused by terrorist acts
- Voting summary: 14 voted for; 1 voted against; None abstained
- Result: Adopted

Security Council composition
- Permanent members: China; France; Russia; United Kingdom; United States
- Non-permanent members: Bulgaria; Cameroon; Colombia; Guinea; Ireland; Mauritius; Mexico; Norway; Singapore; Syria

United Nations Security Council resolution 1450, adopted on 13 December 2002, after reaffirming the principles of the United Nations Charter and resolutions 1189 (1998), 1269 (1999), 1368 (2001) and 1373 (2001), the Council condemned the attacks on Israeli targets in Kikambala and Mombasa, Kenya on 28 November 2002.

The Security Council reaffirmed the need to combat threats to international peace and security caused by terrorist acts and the obligation of states to adhere to the International Convention for the Suppression of Terrorist Bombings and the Convention for the Suppression of Unlawful Acts against the Safety of Civil Aviation. It deplored claims of responsibility by Al-Qaeda for the attacks in Kenya, affirmed the obligations of states under Resolution 1390 (2002), and expressed sympathy and condolences to the families of the victims and the people and governments of Kenya and Israel.

The resolution called upon all states to bring the perpetrators to justice in accordance with their obligations under Resolution 1373. Finally, the Council concluded by expressing its determination to combat all forms of terrorism.

Resolution 1450 was adopted by 14 out of the 15 Council members, while Syria was opposed to it. Explaining their vote, the Syrian representative said the country condemned the terrorist attacks but opposed the repeated use of Israel in the text and language that deviated from the main purpose of the resolution. Furthermore, Syria stated that Israel had committed "terrorist atrocities" itself daily against the Palestinian people. The adoption of the resolution also marked the first time that Israeli losses were mentioned or condemned in a resolution; the Security Council did not mention Israeli losses in the aftermath of the 1994 AMIA bombing in Argentina.

== See also ==
- 2002 Mombasa attacks
- List of United Nations Security Council Resolutions 1401 to 1500 (2002–2003)
