= Ezatullah Haqqani =

Maulavi Ezatullah Haqqani is a citizen of Afghanistan identified as a member of the Taliban's leadership. He was described as being the Taliban's Deputy Minister of Planning in United Nations Resolution 1390. On United Nations Resolution 1267 the Taliban's Deputy Minister of Planning was listed simply as Maulavi Ezatullah.

As late as 3 August 2007 UN officials were still listing his name as Maulavi Ezatullah. Officials have estimated at least three years of birth for Ezatullah, 1968, 1973 and 1957. He is reported to be from Laghman Province.
