= United Nations Security Council Resolution 1526 =

UN Security Council Resolution 1526
- Date: 30 January 2004
- Meeting no.: 4,908
- Code: S/RES/1526 (Document)
- Subject: Threats to international peace and security caused by terrorist acts
- Voting summary: 15 voted for; None voted against; None abstained
- Result: Adopted

Security Council composition
- Permanent members: China; France; Russia; United Kingdom; United States
- Non-permanent members: Algeria; Angola; Benin; Brazil; Chile; Germany; Pakistan; Philippines; Romania; Spain

United Nations Security Council resolution 1526, adopted unanimously on 30 January 2004, after recalling resolutions 1267 (1999), 1333 (2000), 1363 (2001), 1373 (2001), 1390 (2001), 1452 (2002) and 1455 (2003) concerning terrorism, the council tightened sanctions against Al-Qaeda, the Taliban, Osama bin Laden and associated individuals and groups.

== Resolution ==
=== Observations ===
The Security Council urged all states to implement Resolution 1373 and reaffirmed the need to combat threats to international peace and security caused by terrorist acts. It condemned Al-Qaeda and other associated groups for ongoing terrorist attacks and reiterated its overall condemnation of all terrorist acts.

=== Acts ===
Acting under Chapter VII of the United Nations Charter, the council decided to improve the implementation of sanctions including the freezing of financial assets and funds controlled by the Taliban, Al-Qaeda, Osama bin Laden and other groups. The previous sanctions also included an arms embargo and travel ban against the groups and individuals. The Committee established in Resolution 1267 had its mandate strengthened to include a central role for assessing information regarding the effective implementation of the restrictions and making recommendations. The sanctions would be reviewed within 18 months.

All states were called upon to cut the supply of financial assets and funds to the sanctioned individuals and organisations and to establish internal procedures for the monitoring of currency across borders. An Analytical Support and Sanctions Monitoring Team was established to assist the 1267 Committee in the fulfilment of its mandate for an initial period of 18 months, and would be based in New York City. The Secretary-General Kofi Annan was required to appoint eight people to the monitoring team with relevant expertise. It was required to submit three reports on the implementation of the sanctions by countries and suggest improvements, and if necessary, the committee would consider visits to selected countries to improve the implementation of the sanctions and report to the council. An analytical assessment was also requested of the Committee within 17 months.

The resolution urged all countries to co-operate with the monitoring team and Committee, stressing the need for information exchange and providing the names of individuals and entities to be sanctioned. It set a deadline of 31 March 2004, for countries to provide names of Al-Qaeda, Taliban and members of associated groups on their territory. At the same time, states had to informed sanctioned individuals of the measures imposed against them and report on the measures they had taken to implement the sanctions.

== See also ==
- Anti-terrorism legislation
- Counter-terrorism
- List of terrorist incidents
- List of United Nations Security Council Resolutions 1501 to 1600 (2003–2005)
- Terrorist financing
- United Nations Security Council Counter-Terrorism Committee
