= Ali Sayyid Muhamed Mustafa al-Bakri =

Egyptian al-Qaeda member

Ali Sayyid Muhamed Mustafa al-Bakri علي سيد محمد مصطفى البكري
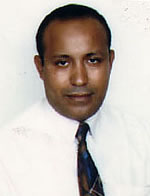
- Al-Qaeda suspect photo from US State Department
- Born: 18 April 1966 (age 59); Bani Suwayf, United Arab Republic
- Other names: Abd al-Aziz al-Masri

Ali Sayyid Muhamed Mustafa al-Bakri (Arabic: علي سيد محمد مصطفى البكري) alias Abd al-Aziz al-Masri (Arabic: عبد العزيز المصري, born 18 April 1966 in Bani Suwayf, Egypt) is an Egyptian member of the Shura Council of the terrorist organization al-Qaeda and a former member of Egyptian Islamic Jihad, from which he migrated to al-Qaeda, along with Ayman al-Zawahiri. Al-Bakri is at large, and the United States Department of State is offering up to US$5 million for information about his location. The State Department wanted poster reads:

Ali Sayyid Muhamed Mustafa al-Bakri is an al-Qaida member and an explosives and chemical weapons expert. He is a member of the al-Qaida Shura council and is a close associate of al-Qaida leaders Saif al-Adel and Ayman al-Zawahiri. Prior to joining al-Qaida, al-Bakri was a member of the Egyptian Islamic Jihad terrorist group, under the direction of Ayman al-Zawahiri. He served as an instructor in al-Qaida's camps in Afghanistan, providing terrorist recruits with training in the use of explosives and chemical weapons. Al-Bakri also unsuccessfully attempted to hijack a Pakistani Air passenger flight in December 2000. It is likely that he continues to train al-Qaida terrorists and other extremists.

For his membership in al-Qaeda, al-Bakri (under the surname Bakri) is under a worldwide embargo by the United Nations Security Council Committee 1267. The UN entry about him, from 2005, says that al-Bakri may be in Iran.

== See also ==
- Abdullah Ahmed Abdullah
- List of fugitives from justice who disappeared
- Osama bin Laden
