= United Nations Security Council Resolution 1388 =

UN Security Council Resolution 1388
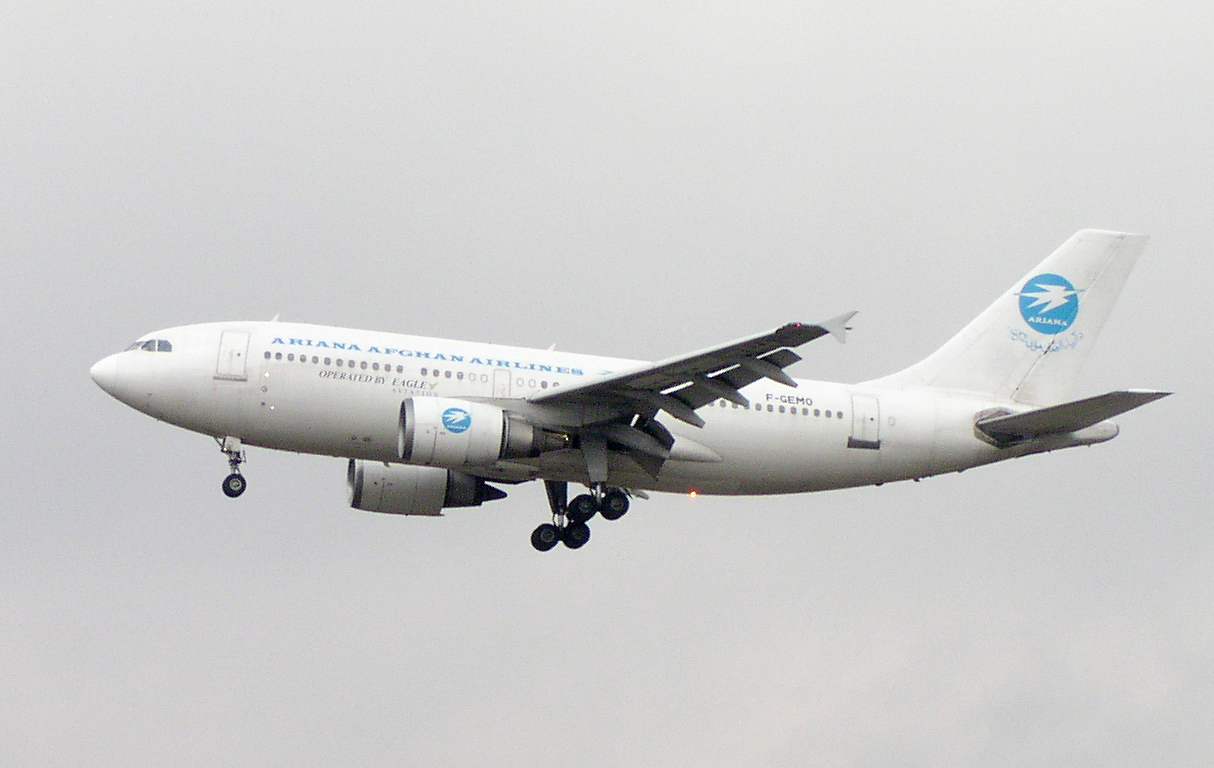
- Ariana Afghan Airlines aircraft
- Date: 15 January 2002
- Meeting no.: 4,449
- Code: S/RES/1388 (Document)
- Subject: The situation in Afghanistan
- Voting summary: 15 voted for; None voted against; None abstained
- Result: Adopted

Security Council composition
- Permanent members: China; France; Russia; United Kingdom; United States
- Non-permanent members: Bulgaria; Cameroon; Colombia; Guinea; Ireland; Mauritius; Mexico; Norway; Singapore; Syria

United Nations Security Council resolution 1388, adopted unanimously on 15 January 2002, after recalling resolutions 1267 (1999) and 1333 (2000) on the situation in Afghanistan, the council, acting under Chapter VII of the United Nations Charter, lifted sanctions against Ariana Afghan Airlines as the airline was no longer controlled by or on behalf of the Taliban.

The provisions of the resolution also terminated restrictions with regard to the airline, such as the denial of all states to refuse permission to allow Ariana Afghan Airlines aircraft to land, take off or overfly their territory; the freezing of funds and financial assets; and the closure of the airline's offices in their territory.

The sanctions were originally put in place to force the Taliban regime to hand over Osama bin Laden who was indicted by the United States over the 1998 bombings in Kenya and Tanzania.

== See also ==
- War in Afghanistan (1978–present)
- International Security Assistance Force
- List of United Nations Security Council Resolutions 1301 to 1400 (2000–2002)
- United Nations Assistance Mission in Afghanistan
- War in Afghanistan (2001–present)
