= Financial Sanctions Unit =

The Financial Sanctions Unit of the Bank of England formerly administered financial sanctions in the United Kingdom on behalf of HM Treasury. It was in operation since before 1993, when it applied sanctions against the Government of Libya. More recently, since Libya became an ally of the United Kingdom, sanctions have been applied against those who allegedly fought against the Government of Libya at the time it was not an ally (see Incidents which have involved the Financial Sanctions Unit). Responsibility for the administration of Financial Sanctions in the UK transferred from the Bank of England to HM Treasury on 24 October 2007. In April 2016 HM Treasury set up the Office of Financial Sanctions Implementation, a new body whose mission is to "provide a high-quality service to the private sector, working closely with law enforcement to help ensure that financial sanctions are properly understood, implemented and enforced."

== Regimes ==
Financial sanctions have established under a multitude of regimes, from UN Security Council Committee Established Pursuant to Resolution 1267 (1999) Concerning Al-Qaida and the Taliban and Associated Individuals and Entities, to EC Commission Regulations, to UK Government orders enforcing trade restrictions against activities in particular countries. Often these authorities overlap so that the same candidates for sanctions are listed from different sources.

Aside from the Al-Qaida and the Taliban regimes, there are sanctions regimes against persons associated with Belarus, Burma, Democratic Republic of the Congo, the former Yugoslavia, Iraq, Ivory Coast, Lebanon, Syria, Liberia, Sudan and Zimbabwe. Previous regimes, which have been lifted, involved Angola, Haiti and Libya.

Many of these measures targeting terrorist organizations have been subsumed into the general provisions of an order which came into force on 12 October 2006, the day after it was laid before Parliament. The new order allows for HM Treasury to target anyone they suspect may be attempting to participate in the commissions of acts of terrorism, and anyone who works on their behalf. This includes by default all those identified by the Security Council committee.

The main instrument for administering the financial sanctions is the publication of a Consolidated list of financial sanctions targets which can be used by banks and other financial institutions to scan their customer databases and discover financial assets controlled by those who are the targets of the sanctions.

== Similar measures ==
The Charity Commission also has powers to freeze the bank accounts of organizations that are registered charities that it suspects are connected with terrorism.

== Politics ==
Financial sanctions regimes are usually passed as secondary legislation on the basis of an earlier Act of Parliament. There are statements made about the process in Parliament, but no sign of an official debate. The power to impose sanctions against suspects designated by the United Nations Security Council is derived from the United Nations Act 1946, and so is not thought to require further approval.

The Chancellor of the Exchequer, Gordon Brown, takes an interest in financial sanctions policy against terrorism, and has made it the subject of major speeches. On 12 October 2006, he announced the broadening of the law to allow for financial sanctions to apply without the need of a UN or EU mandate, and solely on the basis of secret intelligence.

He called his department's handling of the 19 suspects involved in the 2006 transatlantic aircraft plot "the most expeditious and most comprehensive asset freeze the Treasury has undertaken", and claims that "since September 11th almost 200 accounts have been frozen linked to over 100 organisations with suspected connections to Al Qaeda." These were handled as part of the previous regime, by designating those individuals as being connected with Al-Qaeda, without any evidence presented to the public beyond a press release.

== Legal challenges ==
Several of the targeted people have brought their case before the Court of First Instance on the basis that the measures infringe fundamental principles of Community law (such as European Convention on Human Rights which ensures the right of fair trial, and no punishment without law). On 12 July 2006, Faraj Hassan and Chafik Ayadi, both UK residents who had been listed under the regime since 2002, had their cases dismissed with the statement that:

...the Court... recognise[s] that freezing of funds constitutes a particularly drastic measure, but adds that that measure does not prevent the individuals concerned from leading a satisfactory personal, family and social life, given the circumstances. In particular, they are not forbidden to carry on a trade or business activity, it being however understood that the receipt of income from that activity is regulated.

Since the order gives HM Treasury the right to grant licenses which create exemptions to any imposed regime.

== Incidents which have involved the Financial Sanctions Unit ==
- Libyan Islamic Fighting Group - Sanctions applied on 7 February 2006 against five Libyans residing in the UK on the basis of incidents that occurred in the 1990s.
- 2006 transatlantic aircraft plot - All 19 suspects became targets of financial sanctions at the time of their arrest, thus revealing their identities. The Chancellor of the Exchequer called it "the most expeditious and most comprehensive asset freeze the Treasury has undertaken."
