= United Nations Security Council Resolution 1438 =

UN Security Council Resolution 1438
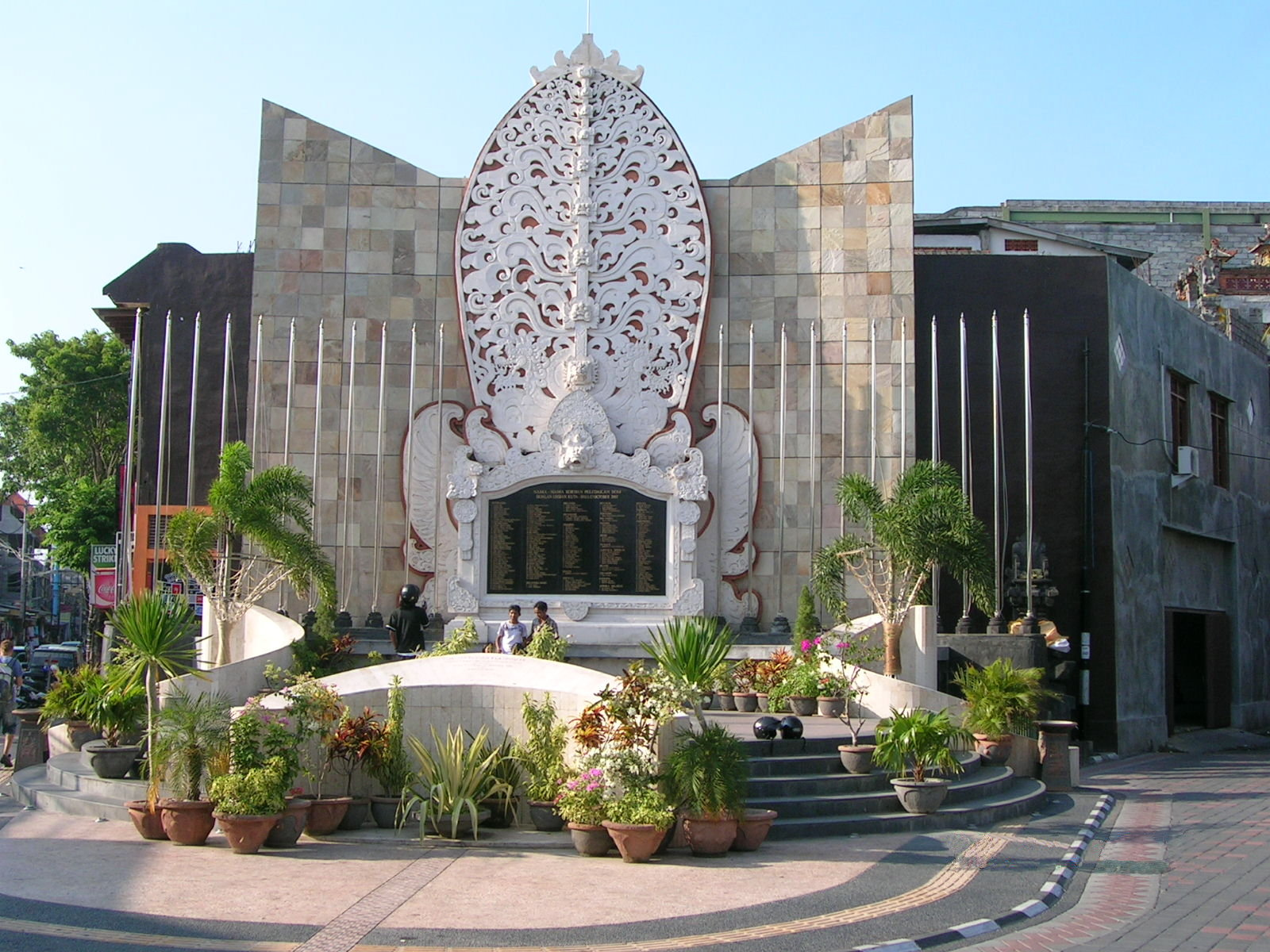
- Memorial to the Bali bombings
- Date: 14 October 2002
- Meeting no.: 4,624
- Code: S/RES/1438 (Document)
- Subject: Threats to international peace and security caused by terrorist acts
- Voting summary: 15 voted for; None voted against; None abstained
- Result: Adopted

Security Council composition
- Permanent members: China; France; Russia; United Kingdom; United States
- Non-permanent members: Bulgaria; Cameroon; Colombia; Guinea; Ireland; Mauritius; Mexico; Norway; Singapore; Syria

United Nations Security Council Resolution 1438, adopted unanimously on 14 October 2002, after reaffirming the principles of the United Nations Charter and Resolution 1373 (2001), the Council condemned the bombings in Bali, Indonesia.

The Security Council reaffirmed the need to combat threats to international peace and security caused by terrorist acts. It condemned terrorist acts carried out in other countries. It expressed sympathy and condolences to the victims, surviving relatives, the Indonesian government and the Indonesian people.

The resolution vows cooperation with and assistance to the Indonesian police to bring the perpetrators to justice in accordance with their obligations under Resolution 1373. Finally, it expresses its determination to combat all forms of terrorism.

== See also ==
- 2002 Bali bombings
- List of United Nations Security Council Resolutions 1401 to 1500 (2002–2003)
