= United Nations Security Council Resolution 1193 =

UN Security Council Resolution 1193
- Date: 28 August 1998
- Meeting no.: 3,921
- Code: S/RES/1193 (Document)
- Subject: The situation in Afghanistan
- Voting summary: 15 voted for; None voted against; None abstained
- Result: Adopted

Security Council composition
- Permanent members: China; France; Russia; United Kingdom; United States
- Non-permanent members: Bahrain; Brazil; Costa Rica; Gabon; Gambia; Japan; Kenya; Portugal; Slovenia; Sweden

United Nations Security Council resolution 1193, adopted unanimously on 28 August 1998, after recalling Resolution 1076 (1996) concerning Afghanistan, the Council discussed the deteriorating political, military and humanitarian situation in Afghanistan during the ongoing civil war in the country.

In the preamble of the resolution, the Council expressed concern at the escalation of the Afghan conflict due to an offensive by the Taliban in the north of the country, causing a threat to international peace and security, destruction and the displacement of large numbers of people and refugees. It was also concerned at the increasingly ethnic and religious nature of the conflict, particularly against the Shiites. Despite calls from the United Nations to cease foreign interventions in Afghanistan, there was continued interference including the involvement of foreign military personnel in addition to arms and ammunition supplies to all parties in the country.

The humanitarian crisis in Afghanistan also concerned the Security Council, which deplored measures by the Taliban which forced the evacuation of United Nations humanitarian personnel from the country. There was concern for Iranian Consulate-General who was kidnapped and the fate of several other Iranian nationals that were missing. It remained disturbed at the deteriorating security situation, the presence of terrorists, drug trafficking, discrimination against girls and women and other violations of human rights and international humanitarian law in Afghanistan.

The Security Council reiterated that the conflict could only be settled through peaceful means, and demanded that all Afghan factions stop fighting and work together towards the aim of establishing a fully representative government that would protect the rights of Afghans. Attacks on United Nations personnel which resulted in casualties from the World Food Programme and United Nations High Commissioner for Refugees in Taliban territory and the kidnap of Iran's Consulate-General in Mazar-i-Sharif were both condemned. All groups had to ensure that humanitarian relief supplies could be delivered and they were reminded of their obligations under the Geneva Conventions.

The Secretary-General Kofi Annan was requested to continue investigations into alleged mass killings of prisoners of war and civilians, ethnically motivated forced displacement and other instances of persecution. He was also required to keep the Council informed on the situation in Afghanistan. Finally, the Afghan factions were urged to end the discrimination against girls and women, to respect human rights, to cease supporting terrorists and halt illegal drug activities.

== See also ==
- War in Afghanistan (1978–present)
- Civil war in Afghanistan (1992–1996)
- Civil war in Afghanistan (1996–2001)
- Human rights in Afghanistan
- List of United Nations Security Council Resolutions 1101 to 1200 (1997–1998)
- United Nations Special Mission to Afghanistan
