= United Nations Security Council Resolution 1267 =

1999 UNSC resolution establishing a sanctions regime against al-Qaeda and the Taliban

UN Security Council Resolution 1267
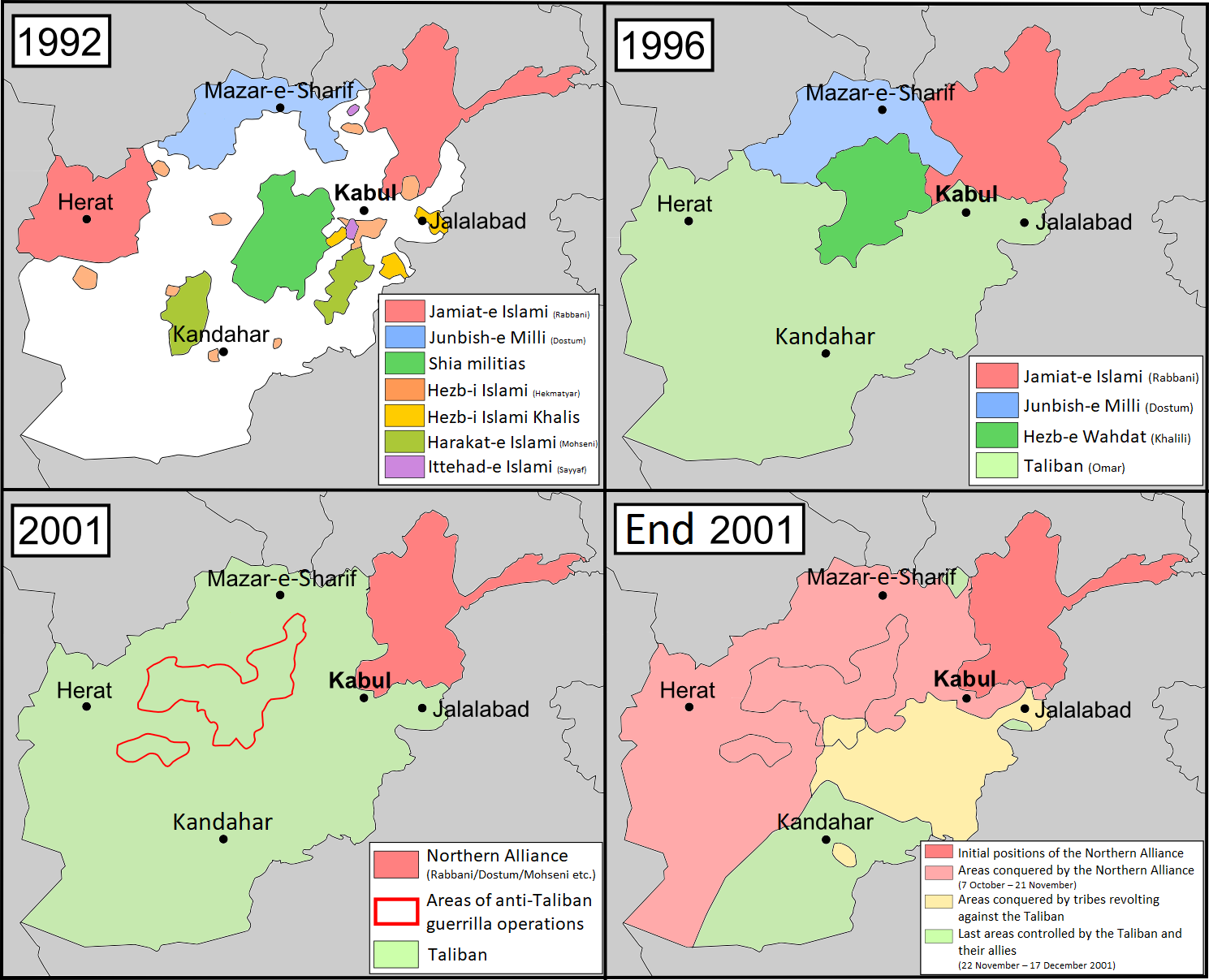
- Areas of control in Afghanistan
- Date: 15 October 1999
- Meeting no.: 4,051
- Code: S/RES/1267 (Document)
- Subject: The situation in Afghanistan
- Voting summary: 15 voted for; None voted against; None abstained
- Result: Adopted

Security Council composition
- Permanent members: China; France; Russia; United Kingdom; United States
- Non-permanent members: Argentina; Bahrain; Brazil; Canada; Gabon; Gambia; Malaysia; Namibia; Netherlands; Slovenia

United Nations Security Council resolution 1267 was adopted unanimously on 15 October 1999. After recalling resolutions 1189 (1998), 1193 (1998) and 1214 (1998) on the situation in Afghanistan, the Council designated Osama bin Laden and associates as terrorists and established a sanctions regime to cover individuals and entities associated with Al-Qaida, Osama bin Laden and/or the Taliban wherever located.

The regime has since been reaffirmed and modified by a dozen further UN Security Council Resolutions. It has been claimed the sanctions regime caused dire hardship to the people of Afghanistan under the Taliban regime at a time when they were heavily reliant on international food aid, while failing to satisfy any of its demands. Since the US invasion of Afghanistan in 2001, the sanctions have been applied to individuals and organizations in all parts of the world.

The regime is composed of a UN Security Council Committee, a "consolidated list" of people and entities it has determined as being associated with Al-Qaeda or the Taliban, and laws which must be passed within each member nation in order to implement the sanctions. The Committee receives reports from each nation as to how the work is proceeding, and is able to vary the conditions imposed on any individual as it sees fit.

There was no right of appeal against listing until December 2006.

== Imposition of the sanctions ==
The first two Security Council Resolutions, 1267 and 1333 (2000), were adopted on 15 October 1999 and 19 December 2000 respectively. They were warmly welcomed by the ambassador for Afghanistan who was not a representative of the Taliban regime that had conquered 80% of his country. Only Malaysia expressed reservations about their effectiveness and concern about the humanitarian consequences to the extent of abstaining on the second resolution. Although voting for the second resolution, United Kingdom privately opposed it on account of the already dire humanitarian situation and the expectation that there would be a backlash against UN aid organizations providing relief in the country.

The first resolution followed the sanctions regime imposed by the United States on 5 July 1999 by an executive order after intelligence officials had found bin Laden-controlled money flowing through banks.

The resolutions imposed a series of demands on member states as well as on Afghanistan under Chapter VII of the United Nations Charter. The first included:

- The Taliban must not allow territory under its control to be used for terrorist training.
- The Taliban must turn over Osama bin Laden to the appropriate authorities.
- All countries must deny flight permission to all Taliban operated aircraft.
- All countries must freeze all financial resources that could benefit the Taliban.
- All countries must report back within 30 days on what measures they had taken.

There were angry demonstrations at the UN offices in Kabul the day after the sanctions were imposed. The international postal service was shut down. A flight over Iran carrying supplies to Baghdad was blocked in October 2000, and another was allowed to Germany carrying sick children.

The December 2000 resolution strengthened the regime and imposed additional conditions:

- The Taliban must eliminate all illicit cultivation of the opium poppy.
- All countries must prevent the sale of all military equipment to the Taliban controlled territories.
- All countries must prevent the sale of acetic anhydride (a chemical used in the production of heroin) to territory of Afghanistan under Taliban control.
- All countries must restrict the entry and transit of all high ranking Taliban officials through their territories.
- All offices of Ariana Afghan Airlines must be closed down.

The following month the BBC reported that the list produced by the UN of officials against whom the sanctions were to be applied was inaccurate and failed to contain any military commanders. Senior UN officials said that the sanctions were completely inappropriate due to the chaos they were causing to the relief missions at a time of a famine.

Shortly thereafter the Taliban showed signs of willingness to strike a deal concerning bin Laden in spite of the political damage it would cause them. They had also substantially reduced the cultivation of opium poppies.

On 30 July 2001, UN Security Council Resolution 1363 established a Monitoring Team to monitor and assist implementation of the measures.

== Criticism ==
Council of Europe Commissioner for Human Rights Thomas Hammarberg stated in 2008 that he believes the "arbitrary procedures for terrorist black-listing must now be changed". He said that he believes the measures have affected a number of rights of the targeted individuals, including the right to privacy, the right to property, the right of association, the right to travel or freedom of movement, and there has been no possibility to appeal or even know all the reasons for the blacklisting, eliminating the right to an effective remedy and due process.

UN Special Rapporteur on the promotion and protection of human rights Martin Scheinin stated in 2008 that "terrorist listing procedures did not meet due process requirements of fair trial". He suggested "introducing an independent review body composed of independent experts, which would be part of the Security Council's decision-making procedure" or even to abolish the 1267 Committee and move the question of listing to the Counter-Terrorism Committee's jurisdiction, on the basis of resolution 1373 (2001).

Canadian Federal Court Judge Russel Zinn wrote in a judgement about the case of Abousfian Abdelrazik (who was listed in 2006), "I add my name to those who view the 1267 Committee regime as a denial of basic legal remedies and as untenable under the principles of international human rights. There is nothing in the listing or de-listing procedure that recognizes the principles of natural justice or that provides for basic procedural fairness. ... It can hardly be said that the 1267 Committee process meets the requirement of independence and impartiality when, as appears may be the case involving Mr. Abdelrazik, the nation requesting the listing is one of the members of the body that decides whether to list or, equally as important, to de-list a person. The accuser is also the judge."

== Post-Taliban resolutions ==
The U.S. invasion of Afghanistan began in October 2001 following a series of ultimatums to the Taliban to hand over Osama bin Laden whom the United States asserted was responsible for the 11 September 2001 attacks. The Taliban regime appeared to overrule a decision by an emergency meeting of Afghan clerics to ask bin Laden to leave voluntarily, and declared that it would be an insult to Islam to hand him over without any actual evidence of guilt. Anti-Taliban forces retook the country, and a new government was set up under Hamid Karzai in December 2001.

On 15 January 2002, the Security Council lifted sanctions from Ariana Afghan Airlines as it was no longer operated by the Taliban in Resolution 1388. The following day, in Resolution 1390, they cancelled all further flight restrictions, but reiterated the financial and military sanctions against Taliban associated individuals and gave all countries 90 days to report on the measures they were taking.

On 20 December 2002, the Security Council, under Resolution 1452, changed the enforcement regime so that individual countries could administer their own exemptions to the financial sanctions. Until then, all financial transactions involving someone who had been designated by the committee as an associate of the Taliban had to be authorized on a case-by-case basis on the grounds of humanitarian need. This resolution allowed countries to free up funds for such individuals for the purposes of paying for food, rent, medicine, tax, legal fees, and so forth. In the United Kingdom the sanctions regime is severe enough that it has been found to apply to the wife of a listed individual who was prevented from withdrawing enough money to take her children to the swimming pool.

The following month in Resolution 1455 the Security Council reinstated the Monitoring Group and reminded all countries that they should be implementing the sanctions and writing reports.

On 20 January 2003 the Security Council convened a high-level meeting of ministers to discuss the subject of combatting terrorism. Resolution 1456 itself was simply the adoption of a declaration made by the ministers, urging intensified efforts from the Counter-Terrorism Committee.

On 30 January 2004 the Security Council passed Resolution 1526 (2004) to strengthen the regime and demanded that:

- All countries must immediately freeze all economic resources that could directly or indirectly benefit anyone on the list
- All countries must prevent entry and transit through their territories of people on the list
- All countries who had not yet done so had to submit their reports by 31 March

On 29 July 2005 the Security Council passed Resolution 1617 (2005) to formalize the procedure for putting individuals onto the Consolidated List.

On 8 August 2006 the Security Council passed Resolution 1699 (2006) welcoming the role of Interpol in applying the sanctions and requesting the Secretary-General to increase cooperation.

== Listing and de-listing procedures ==
Aware of the problem of a lack of minimum standards of evidence or transparency in listing process, and given the relatively high number of individuals on the list, the United Nations Office of Legal Affairs commissioned a study on the question: "Is the UN Security Council ... obliged to ensure that rights of due process, or 'fair and clear procedures', are made available to individuals and entities directly targeted with sanctions under Chapter VII of the UN Charter?"

The report, published in March 2006, was purely theoretical and made no reference to any of the cases. While acknowledging the fact that the UN was a supra-national body to which none of the human rights treaties were targeted, it did find that there were "legitimate expectations that the UN itself, when its action has a direct impact on the rights and freedoms of an individual, observes standards of due process ... on which the person concerned can rely." The fact that "Member States have no authority to review the names of individuals and entities specified by the responsible committee of the Security Council, with the aim of ascertaining [their need to be sanctioned]" meant that people who are targeted need to express their rights before the council. These were that they be informed of the measures taken against them as soon as possible, and that they be able to bring their case before an impartial judge.

On 19 December 2006, the Security Council adopted Resolution 1730 (2006) to establish a de-listing procedure whereby those who found themselves on the list could petition the committee for it to consider their case. During the meeting, the French ambassador said that the inadequacy of the procedures had affected the efficacy of sanctions, and the ambassador for Qatar said that it did not go far enough in respect of legal norms and standards.

The listing procedure also remained opaque until 22 December 2006 when the Security Council adopted Resolution 1735 (2006) which contained a series of forms that countries should fill out in order to put names of people and entities who have connection to the Taliban onto the list.

Throughout its period of operation, the Security Council Committee has issued press releases whenever it makes a change to the list. Sometimes these are of people who are being held in prison in places such as Germany.

When the sanctions measures (based on the Consolidated List) was reaffirmed by resolution 1822(2008), the ambassador from Costa Rica expressed concern that the listing and delisting procedure still did not comply with international standards of due process.

In the summary report submitted to the Council, recommendations were made to improve the user-friendliness of the sanctions website, "for example, by introducing RSS feeds, a map of the website and an internal search function." Also a request for a hit counter – "to explore the technical modalities involved in introducing a tool to track the use of [the] website and ensure that it is fulfilling its intended purpose."

== Individuals subject to sanctions ==
See articles for references

- Ezatullah Haqqani – the Taliban's Deputy Minister for Planning
- Ahmed Yusuf – A Somali-born Swedish citizen put on the list because of his affiliation with the wire transfer network al-Barakat. Removed from the list on 24 August 2006 when all accusations were dropped.
- Mohamed Moumou – Swedish citizen of Moroccan descent added to the list on 7 December 2006, added at the request of the United States.
- Sa'ad Al-Faqih – Saudi dissident, possibly living in London, added to the list December 2004
- al-Haramain Foundation – A charity front based in Saudi Arabia for al-Qaeda, many of whose associates are in the Guantanamo Bay detention camp. Listed September 2004.
- Abdul Majeed al-Zindani – Yemeni academic scholar, added to list in February 2004.
- Khalid al-Fawwaz – Saudi national held captive in London, later extradited to the US and convicted of conspiring in the 1998 United States embassy bombings.
- Ali Sayyid Muhamed Mustafa al-Bakri – Former member of Egyptian Islamic Jihad, possibly remains in Afghanistan
- Hani al-Sibai – Egyptian living in London, added September 2005 at the request of the Egyptian government.
- Abousfian Abdelrazik – Sudanese-Canadian citizen, added to list at U.S. request without explanation, repeatedly cleared of terrorist ties, remains listed
- Anwar al-Awlaki – Yemeni-American citizen, linked to various terrorist plots and al-Qaeda
- Maulvi Ahmad Jan Akhund - Minister and provincial governor in Taliban-ruled Afghanistan, since then a key financier and logistics expert for the Haqqani Network, and Quetta Shura leader.
- Masood Azhar

=== 2010 lift ===
On 27 January 2010, a United Nations sanctions committee removed five former senior Taliban officials from its list of al-Qaeda and Taliban members in a move favoured by Afghan President Karzai. The decision means the five will no longer be subject to an international travel ban, assets freeze and arms embargo. The five men were all high-ranking members of the former Islamic Emirate of Afghanistan:

- Wakil Ahmad Muttawakil, former foreign minister.
- Fazal Mohammad, former deputy minister of commerce.
- Shams-us-Safa Aminzai, former Taliban foreign affairs press officer.
- Mohammad Musa Hottak, former deputy minister of planning.
- Abdul Hakim, former deputy minister of frontier affairs.

All had been added to the list in January or February 2001.

== National offices responsible for implementation ==
In the United Kingdom the regime was implemented through the Financial Sanctions Unit of the Bank of England using the powers granted by the United Nations Act 1946. A number of individuals and their families have been swept up by the measures.

In the United States, the responsible agency is the Office of Foreign Assets Control of the United States Department of the Treasury.

== See also ==
- List of United Nations Security Council Resolutions 1201 to 1300 (1998–2000)
- United Nations Security Council Resolution 1904 (2009)
