= United Nations Security Council Resolution 1455 =

UN Security Council Resolution 1455
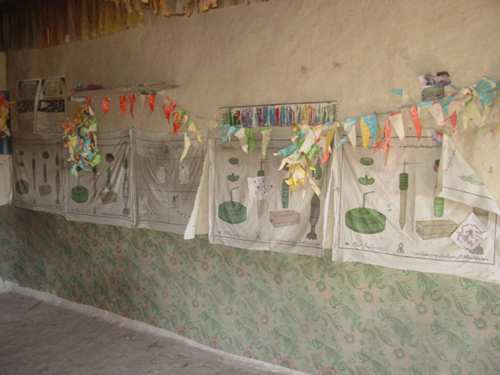
- Al-Qaeda documents
- Date: 17 January 2003
- Meeting no.: 4,686
- Code: S/RES/1455 (Document)
- Subject: Threats to international peace and security caused by terrorist acts
- Voting summary: 15 voted for; None voted against; None abstained
- Result: Adopted

Security Council composition
- Permanent members: China; France; Russia; United Kingdom; United States
- Non-permanent members: Angola; Bulgaria; Chile; Cameroon; Germany; Guinea; Mexico; Pakistan; Spain; Syria

United Nations Security Council resolution 1455, adopted unanimously on 17 January 2003, after recalling resolutions 1267 (1999), 1333 (2000), 1363 (2001), 1373 (2001), 1390 (2001) and 1452 (2002) concerning Al-Qaeda, the Taliban and terrorism, the council improved the implementation of measures against the groups. It was the first Security Council resolution adopted in 2003.

The Security Council urged all states to implement Resolution 1373 and reaffirmed the need to combat threats to international peace and security caused by terrorist acts. It condemned Al-Qaeda and other associated groups for ongoing terrorist attacks, and attacks referred to in resolutions 1368 (2001), 1438 (2002), 1440 (2002) and 1450 (2002).

Acting under Chapter VII of the United Nations Charter, the council decided to improve the implementation of the measures, with a view to further improving them in 12 months if required. The measures included a freezing of funds and financial resources, an arms embargo and travel ban. The need for an improved exchange of information between Committees established in resolutions 1268 and 1373 was stressed. All states were called upon to report within 90 days on steps they had taken to implement the sanctions against the Taliban, Al-Qaeda and Osama bin Laden, including related investigations and enforcement, unless such investigations would be compromised.

The Secretary-General Kofi Annan was requested to reappoint five experts to monitor the implementation of the sanctions over a period of 12 months and to pursue leads relating to incomplete implementation of measures. The Secretary-General also had to ensure that the Committee and Monitoring Group of experts had sufficient access to resources and expertise, and to provide reports and oral assessments to the council on their findings, with a focus on better co-ordination.

== See also ==
- Anti-terrorism legislation
- Counter-terrorism
- List of United Nations Security Council Resolutions 1401 to 1500 (2002–2003)
- Terrorist financing
