= United Nations Security Council Resolution 1904 =

UN Security Council Resolution 1904
- Date: 17 December 2009
- Meeting no.: 6,247
- Code: S/RES/1904 (Document)
- Subject: Threats to international peace and security caused by terrorist acts
- Voting summary: 15 voted for; None voted against; None abstained
- Result: Adopted

Security Council composition
- Permanent members: China; France; Russia; United Kingdom; United States
- Non-permanent members: Austria; Burkina Faso; Costa Rica; Croatia; Japan; Libya; Mexico; Turkey; Uganda; Vietnam

United Nations Security Council Resolution 1904, adopted unanimously on 17 December 2009, after reiterating its "unequivocal condemnation" of Osama bin Laden, the Taliban and Al-Qaeda for "ongoing and multiple criminal terrorist acts", the Council adopted new measures to its decade-old regime of sanctions on the groups and others associated with them. The decision to adopt new measures originated from questions arising since Resolution 1267 (1999) and subsequent resolutions which imposed travel restrictions, asset freezes and an arms embargo on Osama bin Laden, the Taliban, Al-Qaeda and other associated groups which were placed on a "Consolidated List" compiled by the Security Council Committee established by Resolution 1267.

== Details ==
Acting under Chapter VII of the United Nations Charter, the Council expressed concern at the increase in kidnappings and hostage-takings by individuals or groups for political gain or with the aim of raising funds. It added further measures in addition to those in Resolution 1267 (1999), including Member States to permit the addition to frozen accounts "of any payment in favour of listed individuals, groups, undertakings or entities", provided that such payments were already subject to earlier measures. The council made the Sanctions Committee aware of the need for exemptions on humanitarian grounds to be carried out transparently.

Resolution 1904 would also increase the efficiency of the "Consolidated List", by streamlining the listing process of names of individuals and entities onto List, for example, by requesting Member States to provide as much information as possible to the Sanctions Committee.

The council, in Resolution 1904, established an Office of the Ombudsperson for an initial period of 18 months to deal with delisting issues. The official would be appointed by the Secretary-General, the responsibilities of which are described in Annex II of the resolution.

The resolution goes on to direct the Sanctions Committee to complete its review of all names on the "Consolidated List" by 30 June 2010, and to conduct an annual review of all names that had not been reviewed in three or more years. It further required the committee to conduct a comprehensive review of all pending issues before it and urged the panel to resolve such issues, to the extent possible, by 31 December 2010.

Finally, the council also decided to extend the mandate of the New York-based Monitoring Team it established in 2004 under Resolution 1526, for a further period of 18 months, as well as requiring it to continue carrying out measures in a report described in Resolution 1822 (2008).

== See also ==
- List of United Nations Security Council Resolutions 1901 to 2000 (2009–2011)
- Terrorism
