= United Nations Security Council Resolution 1699 =

UN Security Council Resolution 1699
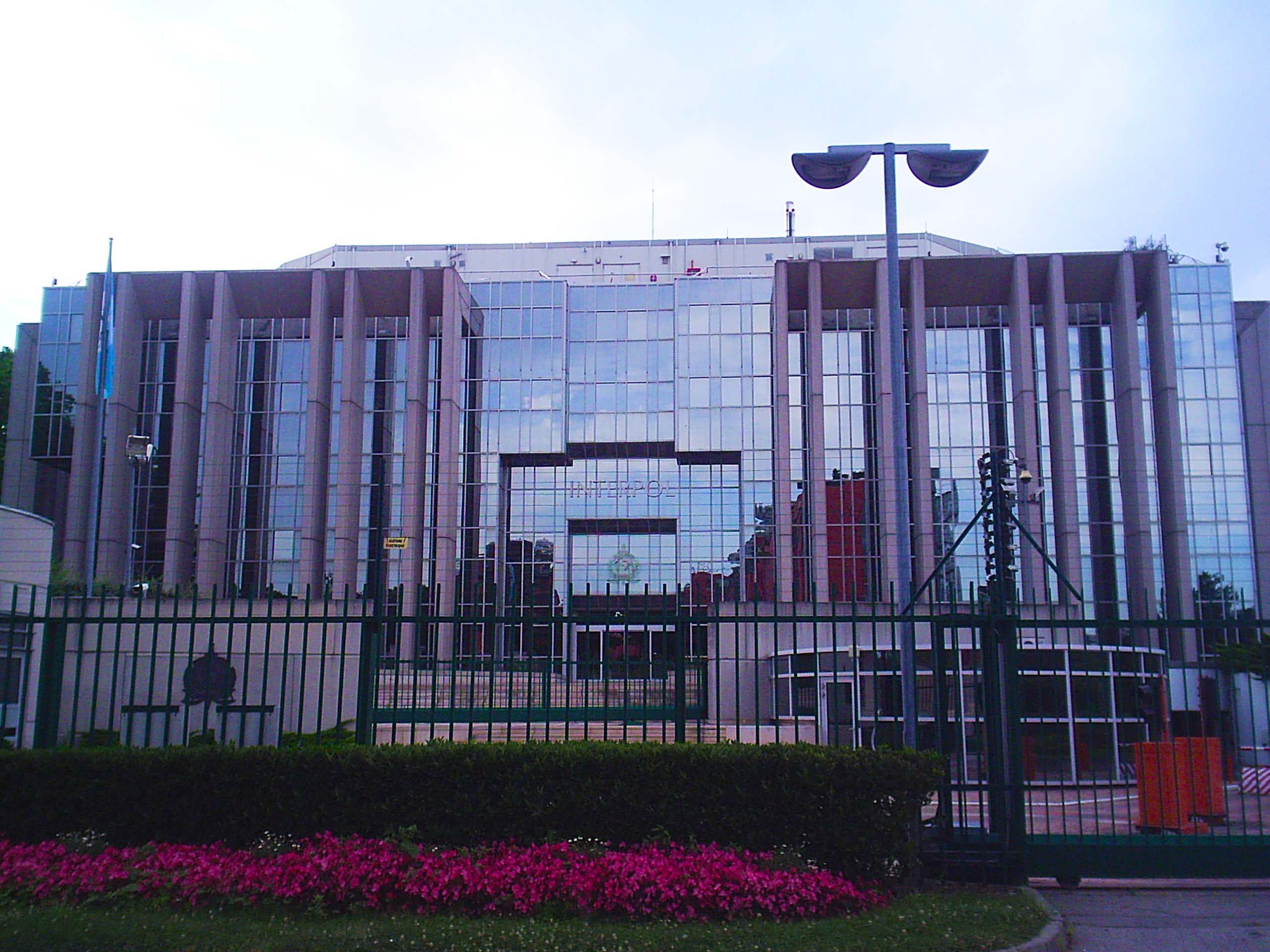
- Interpol headquarters in Lyon
- Date: 8 August 2006
- Meeting no.: 5,501
- Code: S/RES/1699 (Document)
- Subject: General issues relating to sanctions
- Voting summary: 15 voted for; None voted against; None abstained
- Result: Adopted

Security Council composition
- Permanent members: China; France; Russia; United Kingdom; United States
- Non-permanent members: Argentina; Rep. of the Congo; Denmark; Ghana; Greece; Japan; Peru; Qatar; Slovakia; Tanzania

United Nations Security Council Resolution 1699, adopted unanimously on August 8, 2006, after recalling Resolution 1617 (2005) on co-operation between Interpol and the Committee established in Resolution 1267 (1999), the Council requested the Secretary-General to take steps to increase co-operation between the United Nations and Interpol.

== Observations ==
The Council recalled the 1997 agreement between Interpol and the United Nations. It welcomed the role Interpol had played to assist the 1267 Committee in the fulfilment of its mandate, and recognised that this co-operation could benefit other sanctions committees established by the Security Council, including in the role of law enforcement.

== Acts ==
The Secretary-General Kofi Annan was required to take "necessary steps" to increase co-operation between the United Nations and Interpol, in order for Security Council committees to fulfil their roles more effectively and to allow countries to better implement measures adopted by the Security Council.

Furthermore, states were encouraged to use tools offered by Interpol, including the I-24/7 worldwide police communications system, to reinforce measures approved the Security Council.

== See also ==
- Interpol notice
- List of United Nations Security Council Resolutions 1601 to 1700 (2005–2006)
