= United Nations Special Mission to Afghanistan =

The United Nations Special Mission to Afghanistan was established by United Nations Secretary-General following a request by the General Assembly in December 1993.

Its offices were forced to close in May 2001.

== See also ==
- United Nations Assistance Mission in Afghanistan
