= United Nations Security Council Resolution 1730 =

UN Security Council Resolution 1730
- United Nations emblem
- Date: 19 December 2006
- Meeting no.: 5,599
- Code: S/RES/1730 (Document)
- Subject: General issues relating to sanctions
- Voting summary: 15 voted for; None voted against; None abstained
- Result: Adopted

Security Council composition
- Permanent members: China; France; Russia; United Kingdom; United States
- Non-permanent members: Argentina; Rep. of the Congo; Denmark; Ghana; Greece; Japan; Peru; Qatar; Slovakia; Tanzania

United Nations Security Council Resolution 1730, adopted unanimously on December 19, 2006, after emphasising the role of sanctions, the Council requested the Secretary-General to establish a focal point within the Secretariat to ensure "fair and clear" procedures for placing individuals and entities on sanctions lists and for removing them.

== Resolution ==
=== Observations ===
Reaffirming the importance of sanctions in maintaining international peace and security, the Council urged all Member States to implement obligations placed upon them. It wanted to ensure that sanctions were targeted in support of clear objectives and implemented fairly, as well as having humanitarian exceptions.

=== Acts ===
The Security Council adopted a de-listing procedure provided in the annex of the resolution. Sanctions committees established in resolutions 751 (1992), 918 (1994), 1132 (1997), 1267 (1999), 1518 (2003), 1533 (2004), 1572 (2004), 1591 (2005), 1636 (2005) and 1718 (2006) were asked to revise their guidelines accordingly.

== De-listing procedure ==
The Secretary-General was asked to establish a focal point within the Secretariat to receive requests for de-listing. The focal point was to receive petitions for de-listing which would then be forwarded on to the governments of the individual's residence. It de-listing is approved, rejected or no action is taken by the relevant governments, the Committee would be informed in all instances and if necessary, approve or reject the application. The petitioner would then be informed of the decision.

== See also ==
- List of United Nations Security Council Resolutions 1701 to 1800 (2006–2008)
