= United Nations Security Council Resolution 1189 =

UN Security Council Resolution 1189
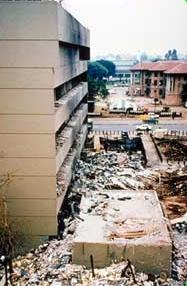
- Aftermath of bombing in Kenya
- Date: 13 August 1998
- Meeting no.: 3,915
- Code: S/RES/1189 (Document)
- Subject: Acts of international terrorism
- Voting summary: 15 voted for; None voted against; None abstained
- Result: Adopted

Security Council composition
- Permanent members: China; France; Russia; United Kingdom; United States
- Non-permanent members: Bahrain; Brazil; Costa Rica; Gabon; Gambia; Japan; Kenya; Portugal; Slovenia; Sweden

United Nations Security Council resolution 1189 was adopted unanimously on 13 August 1998. In the resolution, after expressing its deep disturbance at the bombings in Nairobi, Kenya, and Dar es Salaam, Tanzania, on 7 August 1998, the Council strongly condemned the terrorist attacks and called on countries to adopt measures to prevent further incidents.

== Background ==
On 7 August 1998, hundreds of people were killed in simultaneous truck bomb explosions at the United States embassies in the major East African cities of Dar es Salaam, Tanzania, and Nairobi, Kenya. The attacks, linked to local members of the Egyptian Islamic Jihad, brought Osama bin Laden and Ayman al-Zawahiri to American attention for the first time, and resulted in the United States Federal Bureau of Investigation placing bin Laden on its Ten Most Wanted list.

== Resolution ==
The Security Council was shocked at the attacks which had a damaging effect on international relations and was convinced that the suppression of acts of terrorism was essential for international peace and security. It stressed that every Member State should refrain from organising, encouraging or participating in terrorist acts in other countries. Furthermore, there was a need to strengthen international co-operation between states to take measures to prevent and combat terrorism.

The bombings in Nairobi and Dar es Salaam were strongly condemned, and condolences were expressed to the families of the victims. All countries and international institutions were urged to provide assistance to the investigations in Kenya, Tanzania and the United States to apprehend those responsible and to facilitate reconstruction of infrastructure in both countries. Finally, all countries were urged to adopt, in accordance with international law, measures for security and co-operation to prevent further acts and for the prosecution and punishment of the perpetrators of terrorism.

== See also ==
- List of United Nations Security Council Resolutions 1101 to 1200 (1997–1998)
- Timeline of al-Qaeda attacks
