= United Nations Security Council Resolution 1566 =

UN Security Council Resolution 1566
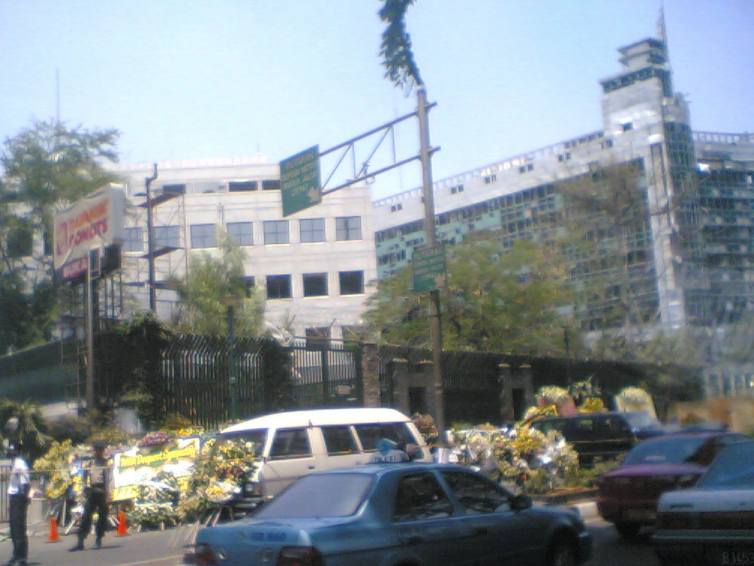
- Aftermath of the 2004 Australian embassy bombing in Jakarta (2004)
- Date: 8 October 2004
- Meeting no.: 5,053
- Code: S/RES/1566 (Document)
- Subject: Threats to international peace and security caused by terrorist acts
- Voting summary: 15 voted for; None voted against; None abstained
- Result: Adopted

Security Council composition
- Permanent members: China; France; Russia; United Kingdom; United States
- Non-permanent members: Algeria; Angola; Benin; Brazil; Chile; Germany; Pakistan; Philippines; Romania; Spain

United Nations Security Council resolution 1566, adopted unanimously on 8 October 2004, after reaffirming resolutions 1267 (1999), 1373 (2001) and 1540 (2004), the Council condemned terrorism as a serious threat to peace and strengthened anti-terrorism legislation.

== Resolution ==
Condemning terrorism as one of the most serious threats to peace and security, the council called on countries to prosecute or extradite anyone supporting terrorist acts or participating in the planning of such schemes. Acting under Chapter VII of the United Nations Charter, it set up a working group to consider recommendations on measures to be imposed against "individuals, groups or entities involved in or associated with terrorist activities" not already identified by its Al-Qaeda and Taliban sanctions committee. There was concern at the increasing number of victims of terrorist attacks, including children.

Some approaches to be studied included "more effective procedures considered to be appropriate for bringing them to justice through prosecution or extradition," freezing financial assets, travel restrictions and arms embargoes.

The text called on countries to prevent and punish "criminal acts, including against civilians, committed with the intent to cause death or serious bodily injury, or taking of hostages, with the purpose to provoke a state of terror in the general public or in a group of persons or particular persons, intimidate a population or compel a government or an international organization to do or to abstain from doing any act." Such acts were "under no circumstances justifiable by considerations of a political, philosophical, ideological, racial, ethnic, religious or other similar nature," according to the council.

The resolution also asked the working group to consider the possibility of establishing an international compensation fund for victims of terrorist acts and their families, which might be financed through voluntary contributions generated in part from assets seized from terrorist organizations, their members and sponsors. Furthermore, the Secretary-General Kofi Annan was requested to make the Counter-Terrorism Committee Executive Directorate operation as soon as possible.

== Adoption ==
Ambassador Andrey I. Denisov of Russia – which sponsored the resolution along with the People's Republic of China, France, Germany, Romania, Spain, the United Kingdom and the United States – stressed there was a need to improve the legal and other operational instruments to combat terrorism and terrorist organizations that are expert at changing their tactics depending on the situation. "We are convinced that the resolution further strengthens the essential coordinating role of the United Nations in the international campaign against the terrorist threat," he said.

Ambassador Emyr Jones Parry of the United Kingdom, which held the council's rotating presidency in October 2004, said that the 15-member body "reaffirmed their view that terrorism in all its forms and manifestations constitutes one of the most serious threats to international peace and security, and that any acts of terrorism are criminal and unjustifiable, regardless of their motivation, whenever and by whomsoever committed." Ambassador Jones Parry also said that text reaffirmed the UN's central role in the fight against terrorism as well as the council's determination "to stand together in confronting the scourge of terrorism."

U.S. Ambassador John Danforth said root causes in no way justified terrorism. "The resolution which we have adopted states very simply that the deliberate massacre of innocents is never justifiable in any cause – never." He added that "Some claim that exploding bombs in the midst of children is in the service of God," but that such an act "is the ultimate blasphemy."

The resolution came days after terrorist attacks in Pakistan, Egypt, and the beheading of a British hostage Kenneth Bigley in Iraq, all of which were considered the work of Al-Qaeda. It was also the culmination of anti-terrorism diplomatic efforts by Russia following the Beslan school massacre.

== See also ==
- Anti-terrorism legislation
- Counter-terrorism
- List of terrorist incidents
- List of United Nations Security Council Resolutions 1501 to 1600 (2003–2005)
- Terrorist financing
- Timber Sycamore
