= United Nations Security Council Resolution 1452 =

UN Security Council Resolution 1452
- Flag of the Taliban
- Date: 20 December 2002
- Meeting no.: 4,678
- Code: S/RES/1452 (Document)
- Subject: The situation in Afghanistan
- Voting summary: 15 voted for; None voted against; None abstained
- Result: Adopted

Security Council composition
- Permanent members: China; France; Russia; United Kingdom; United States
- Non-permanent members: Bulgaria; Cameroon; Colombia; Guinea; Ireland; Mauritius; Mexico; Norway; Singapore; Syria

United Nations Security Council resolution 1452, adopted unanimously on 20 December 2002, after recalling resolutions 1267 (1999), 1333 (2000), 1363 (2001), 1368 (2001) and 1390 (2001) concerning Al-Qaeda, the Taliban and terrorism, the Council decided that financial sanctions against the organisations would not apply to expenses for food, rent, medicine and medical care, health insurance and professional fees.

The Security Council reaffirmed Resolution 1373 (2001) and its determination to facilitate the implementation of counterterrorism obligations. Acting under Chapter VII of the United Nations Charter, the Security Council exempted funds necessary for basic expenses such as food, rent, medical care and professional fees and extraordinary expenses from financial sanctions against Osama bin Laden, the Taliban and Al-Qaeda. At the same time, it decided that the provision not to freeze accounts on humanitarian grounds no longer applied. States could also allow the addition of interest or other earnings to the accounts.

== See also ==
- List of United Nations Security Council Resolutions 1401 to 1500 (2002–2003)
- Terrorist financing
