= United Nations Security Council Resolution 1822 =

UN Security Council Resolution 1822
- Date: 30 June 2008
- Meeting no.: 5,928
- Code: S/RES/1822 (Document)
- Subject: Threats to international peace and security caused by terrorist acts
- Voting summary: 15 voted for; None voted against; None abstained
- Result: Adopted

Security Council composition
- Permanent members: China; France; Russia; United Kingdom; United States
- Non-permanent members: Burkina Faso; Belgium; Costa Rica; Croatia; Indonesia; Italy; Libya; Panama; South Africa; Vietnam

United Nations Security Council Resolution 1822 was unanimously adopted on 30 June 2008.

== Resolution ==
Extending by 18 months the mandate of the current New York-based Monitoring Team concerned with overseeing Council-imposed sanctions against members and/or associates of Al-Qaida, Usama bin Laden and the Taliban, the Security Council this morning provided “clear and fair procedures” for the maintenance of the Consolidated List of persons to whom those sanctions apply.

Unanimously adopting resolution 1822 (2008) under Chapter VII of the United Nations Charter, the Council decided that all States should apply a combination of sanctions described in resolutions 1267 (1999), 1333 (2000) and 1390 (2002), including the assets freeze, travel restrictions and the arms embargo.

The Council directed the Committee established pursuant to resolution 1267 (1999), with the assistance of the Monitoring Team, to make accessible on its website publicly releasable reasons for listing the individuals or entities concerned. The country where the listed individual or entity was believed to be located and the country of which a listed person was a national should notify or inform the individual or entity of the designation together with the publicly releasable reasons.

By other terms of the resolution, the Council directed the 1267 Committee to conduct a review of all names on the Consolidated List by 30 June 2010 in order to ensure that the List was as accurate as possible, and to confirm that listing remained appropriate. It further directed the Committee, after completion of the review, to conduct an annual review of all names that had not been reviewed in three or more years.

The Council encouraged the Committee to continue to ensure that fair and clear procedures existed for placing individuals and entities on the Consolidated List, for removing them and for granting humanitarian exemptions.

Speaking after the adoption of the text, the representative of Costa Rica stressed the need to take strong action against terrorism but said it must be undertaken within international law and in compliance with the Charter, with all the organs of the United Nations playing their proper role. For that reason, legal mechanisms to combat terrorism must be developed in conjunction with the General Assembly.

While praising provisions in the resolution requiring the presentation of reasons for the listing of individuals subject to sanctions, he said mechanisms described in paragraph 28 were not strong enough to improve current methods of listing and delisting. For that reason, the Council should seriously consider other proposals to protect the rights of listed individuals.

== See also ==
- List of United Nations Security Council Resolutions 1801 to 1900 (2008–2009)
