= United Nations Security Council Resolution 1363 =

UN Security Council Resolution 1363
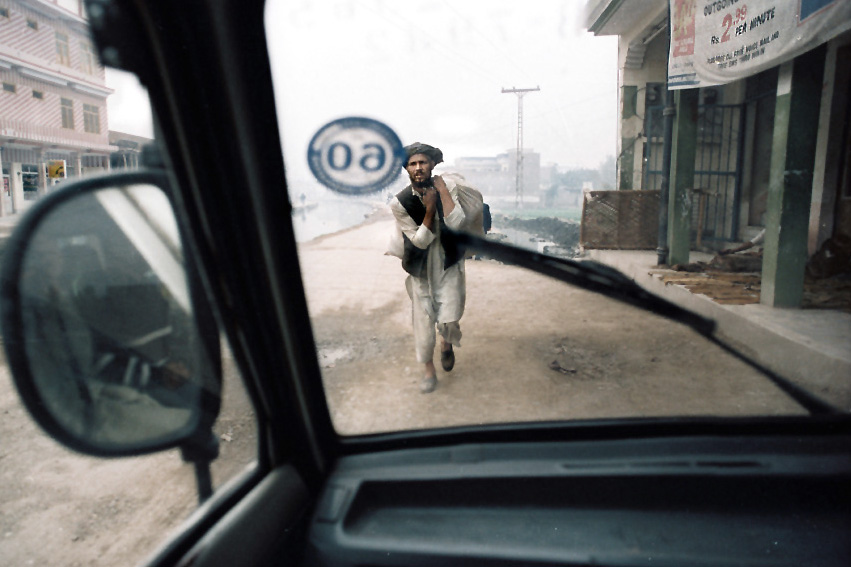
- Taliban confederate
- Date: 30 July 2001
- Meeting no.: 4,352
- Code: S/RES/1363 (Document)
- Subject: The situation in Afghanistan
- Voting summary: 15 voted for; None voted against; None abstained
- Result: Adopted

Security Council composition
- Permanent members: China; France; Russia; United Kingdom; United States
- Non-permanent members: Bangladesh; Colombia; Ireland; Jamaica; Mali; Mauritius; Norway; Singapore; Tunisia; Ukraine

United Nations Security Council resolution 1363, adopted unanimously on 30 July 2001, after reaffirming all resolutions on the situation in Afghanistan, including resolutions 1267 (1999) and 1333 (2000), the Council requested the Secretary-General to establish a mechanism to monitor the implementation of sanctions against the Taliban.

The Security Council determined that the situation in Afghanistan constituted a threat to international peace and security, and, acting under Chapter VII of the United Nations Charter, requested all countries to comply with previous sanctions against the Taliban, Al-Qaeda and Osama bin Laden. It requested the Secretary-General Kofi Annan to establish a mechanism within 30 days to:

(a) monitor the implementation of measures included in resolution 1267 and 1333;
(b) provide assistance to states neighbouring Afghan territory under Taliban control with regard to the implementation of the sanctions;
(c) investigate violations of the measures.

The mechanism would consist of a Monitoring Group of up to five experts based in New York City to monitor the implementation of the measures with respect to arms embargoes counter-terrorism and money laundering, and a support team under its co-ordination consisting of 15 members based in states neighbouring Afghanistan. The Monitoring Group was required to report to the Committee of the Security Council established in Resolution 1267, of which the latter would report to the Security Council.

All countries were asked to strengthen and enforce the sanctions under their domestic laws against individuals and entities operating on their territory to deal with violations of the measures. All states were subsequently invited to report the results of their findings to the Committee unless it would compromise their investigations. Finally, the Secretary-General was called upon to make arrangements to support the monitoring mechanism and the Council declared its intention to review the measures based on information provided through the monitoring mechanism.

The resolution, proposed by Colombia, allowed for monitors to be stationed mainly in Pakistan; measures were not adopted against the Northern Alliance. In response to the adoption of Resolution 1363, the Taliban and affiliated groups said they would kill United Nations monitors stationed at the border between Afghanistan and Pakistan.

== See also ==
- War in Afghanistan (1978–present)
- Civil war in Afghanistan (1996–2001)
- List of United Nations Security Council Resolutions 1301 to 1400 (2000–2002)
- United Nations Special Mission to Afghanistan
