= United Nations Security Council Resolution 1390 =

UN Security Council Resolution 1390
- Date: 16 January 2002
- Meeting no.: 4,452
- Code: S/RES/1390 (Document)
- Subject: The situation in Afghanistan
- Voting summary: 15 voted for; None voted against; None abstained
- Result: Adopted

Security Council composition
- Permanent members: China; France; Russia; United Kingdom; United States
- Non-permanent members: Bulgaria; Cameroon; Colombia; Guinea; Ireland; Mauritius; Mexico; Norway; Singapore; Syria

United Nations Security Council resolution 1390, adopted unanimously on 16 January 2002, after recalling resolutions 1267 (1999), 1333 (2000), 1363 (2001), 1368 (2001), 1373 (2001) 1378 (2001) and 1383 (2001) concerning the situation in Afghanistan and terrorism, the Council imposed further sanctions on Osama bin Laden, Al-Qaeda, the Taliban and others associated with them.

Although the Security Council had adopted sanctions resolutions against non-state entities in the past, Resolution 1390 marked the first time had adopted a resolution without a territorial connection.

== Resolution ==
=== Observations ===
The Security Council noted the continuing activities of Osama bin Laden and the Al-Qaeda network in supporting international terrorism. It reaffirmed its condemnation of the September 11 attacks in the United States and the indictments issued against Osama bin Laden and affiliates following the 1998 bombings in Kenya and Tanzania.

Furthermore, the preamble of the resolution determined that the Taliban had not responded to Security Council demands. It condemned the Taliban for allowing Afghanistan to be used as a base for terrorist activities and training by the Al-Qaeda network. It denounced Al-Qaeda and associated terrorist groups for multiple terrorist attacks resulting in the death of innocent civilians and destruction to property.

=== Acts ===
Acting under Chapter VII of the United Nations Charter, the Council decided to continue measures that would freeze the funds of Al-Qaeda and the Taliban and lifted measures in relation to aircraft formerly controlled by the Taliban in accordance with Resolution 1388 (2002). It then decided to impose further measures with respect to Osama bin Laden, the Taliban and Al-Qaeda, calling on all states to:

(a) freeze economic resources and other financial assets without delay;
(b) prevent entry into or the transit through their territories of the individuals and organisations;
(c) impose an arms embargo.

The measures would be reviewed within 12 months and all states were urged to fully implement Resolution 1373. The security council committee established in Resolution 1267 was requested to submit regular reports to the council on the implementation of the current resolution based on information submitted to it by countries on the action they had taken. All states were urged to report within 90 days and thereafter according to a timetable established by the committee.

All countries were asked to strengthen and enforce the sanctions under their domestic laws against individuals and entities operating on their territory to deal with violations of the measures. Furthermore, they were subsequently invited to report the results of their findings to the committee unless it would compromise their investigations. The Secretary-General Kofi Annan was requested to assign the monitoring group whose mandate was to expire on 19 January 2002 to monitor the implementation of sanctions contained in the current resolution. It was required to report by 31 March 2002 and every four months thereafter.

== See also ==
- Civil war in Afghanistan
- International Security Assistance Force
- List of terrorist incidents
- List of United Nations Security Council Resolutions 1301 to 1400 (2000–2002)
- United Nations Assistance Mission in Afghanistan
- War in Afghanistan (2001–present)
