= United Nations Security Council Resolution 1373 =

UN Security Council Resolution 1373
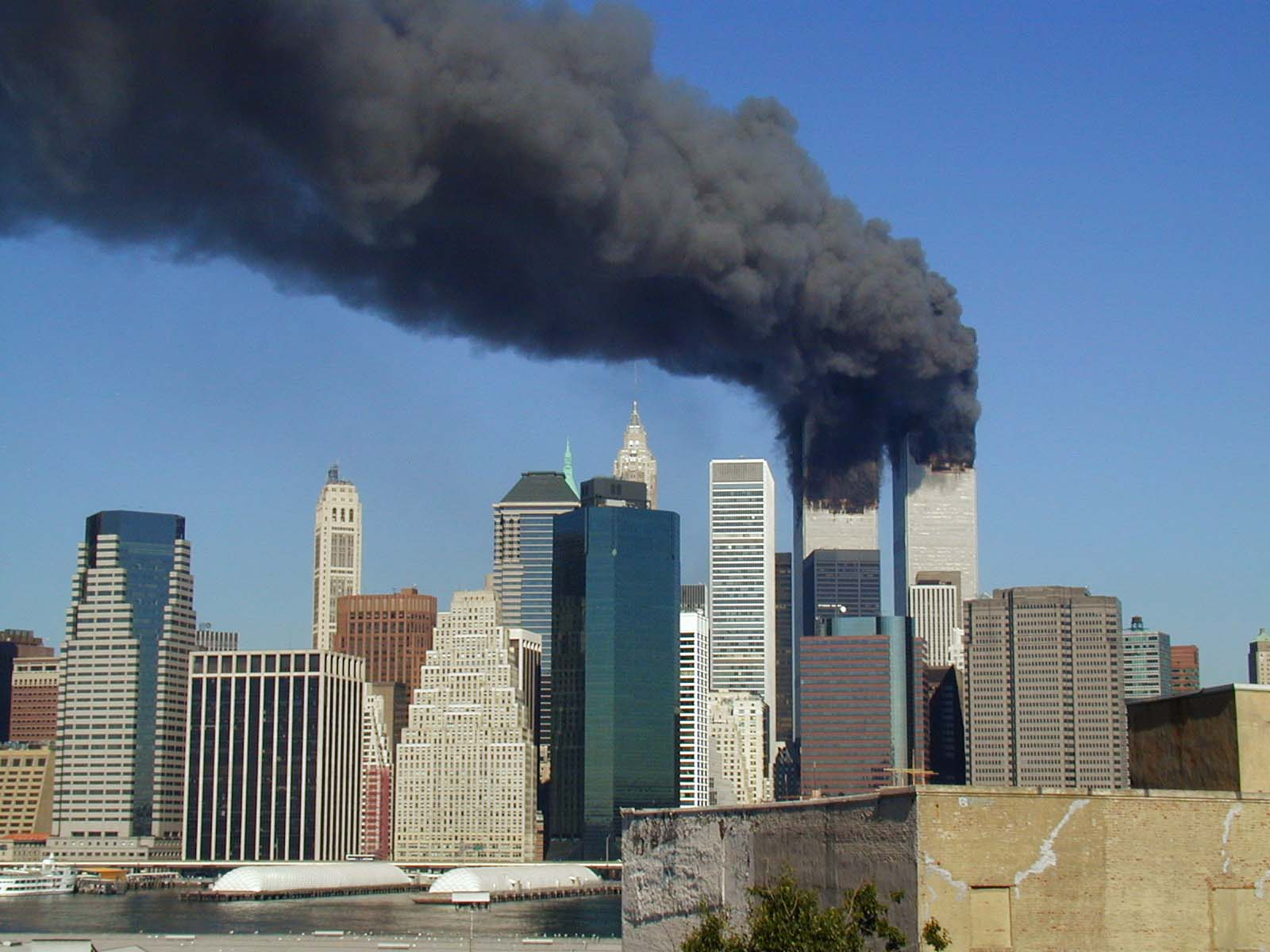
- Terrorist attack on World Trade Center, 11 September 2001
- Date: 28 September 2001
- Meeting no.: 4,385
- Code: S/RES/1373 (Document)
- Subject: Threats to international peace and security caused by terrorist acts
- Voting summary: 15 voted for; None voted against; None abstained
- Result: Adopted

Security Council composition
- Permanent members: China; France; Russia; United Kingdom; United States
- Non-permanent members: Bangladesh; Colombia; Ireland; Jamaica; Mali; Mauritius; Norway; Singapore; Tunisia; Ukraine

United Nations Security Council Resolution 1373, adopted unanimously on 28 September 2001, is a counterterrorism measure passed following the 11 September terrorist attacks on the United States. The resolution was adopted under Chapter VII of the United Nations Charter, and is therefore binding on all UN member states.

According to the official record of the meeting, the meeting convoked at 9:55 pm and adjourned at 10:00 pm. The five-minute meeting exemplified the Security Council's working method, in which the meeting serves only as a public announcement of a decision that has already been reached in secret in "informal consultations". Although the United States is widely credited with initiating Resolution 1373, once adopted unanimously, the resolution became a common act of the Security Council, and therefore all its members at the time had ownership over it.

== Aims of the resolution ==
The resolution aimed to hinder terrorist groups in various ways. It recalled provisions from resolutions 1189 (1998), 1269 (1999) and 1368 (2001) concerning terrorism. UN member states were encouraged to share their intelligence on terrorist groups in order to assist in combating international terrorism. The resolution also calls on all states to adjust their national laws so that they can ratify all of the existing international conventions on terrorism. It stated that all States "should also ensure that terrorist acts are established as serious criminal offences in domestic laws and regulations and that the seriousness of such acts is duly reflected in sentences served."

The resolution established the Security Council's Counter Terrorism Committee [CTC] to monitor state compliance with its provisions.

It also aimed at restricting immigration law, stating that "before granting refugee status, all States should take appropriate measures to ensure that the asylum seekers had not planned, facilitated or participated in terrorist acts. Further, States should ensure that refugee status was not abused by the perpetrators, organizers or facilitators of terrorist acts, and that claims of political motivation were not recognized as grounds for refusing requests for the extradition of alleged terrorists."

However, the resolution failed to define 'terrorism', and the working group initially only added Al-Qaeda and the Taliban regime of Afghanistan on the sanctions list. This also entailed the possibility that authoritarian regimes could label even non-violent activities as terrorist acts, thus infringing upon basic human rights.

== Resolution 1456 (2003) ==
The absence of any specific reference to human rights considerations was remedied in part by Resolution 1456 (2003) which declared that "States must ensure that any measure taken to combat terrorism comply with all their obligations under international law, and should adopt such measures in accordance with international law, in particular, international human rights, refugee, and humanitarian law."

== Resolution 1566 ==
UN Security Council Resolution 1566 picked up loose ends from resolution 1373 by actually spelling out what the Security Council sees as terrorism:

criminal acts, including against civilians, committed with the intent to cause death or serious bodily injury, or taking of hostages, with the purpose to provoke a state of terror in the general public or in a group of persons or particular persons, intimidate a population or compel a government or an international organization to do or to abstain from doing any act.

Although this definition has operative effect for the purposes of Security Council action, it does not represent a definition of "terrorism" which binds all states in international law. That is a task which could only be achieved by way of agreeing to an international treaty under the auspices of the UN General Assembly. Negotiations towards agreeing to such are ongoing, and a Comprehensive Convention exists in draft form, however agreement to its exact terms, most particularly the definition of "terrorism", remains elusive.

Resolution 1566 also called for the creation of a working group that will expand the list of terrorist entities under sanction beyond the Taliban and Al-Qaeda.

== National implementation ==
Most states complied with the resolution, with varying willingness (Mexico and Venezuela being quite reluctant, especially concerning the freezing of assets of persons or groups whom they had no evidence of involvement in terrorism), but only a few of them did so by explicitly referring to the UN resolution.

Russia implemented the resolution with great willingness – President of Russia Vladimir Putin translated the resolution into Russian and enacted it as domestic law by 10 January 2002 in the decree of the president of the Russian Federation No 6 on Measures Towards the Implementation of UN Security Resolution 1373.

On 1 April 2014, the Government of Sri Lanka signed an order designating 16 organisations functioning as terrorist fronts on foreign soil freezing all assets and economic resources of those, using this resolution.

== CTC 2008 report ==
Recommendations of the Counter Terrorism Committee 2008 report included increased measures concerning illegal immigration (considered, without evidence, as a serious risk to security) as well as:

- to "Promote inter-agency coordination and the exchange of counter-terrorism information at the national, regional and international levels";
- to "Encourage States to establish dedicated and permanent counter-terrorism units, with the assistance of experts seconded from various specialized institutions, in areas such as criminal law, counter-financing of terrorism and border control";
- to "Encourage greater cooperation with INTERPOL and increased utilization of its resources and databases, such as red notices and watch lists" (Interpol created in 2002 the Interpol Terrorism Watch List).

== Criticism ==
Oxford University public law professor Stefan Talmon argued that this resolution is an example of the United Nations Security Council veering into legislating law in the aftermath of the September 11 terrorist attacks when its role is to apply and interpret international law.

== See also ==
- United Nations Security Council Resolution 1267 (1999) establishing the Al-Qaida and Taliban Sanctions Committee
- Anti-terrorism legislation
- Counterterrorism
- List of terrorist incidents
- List of United Nations Security Council Resolutions 1301 to 1400 (2000–2002)
