= United Nations Security Council Resolution 1333 =

UN Security Council Resolution 1333
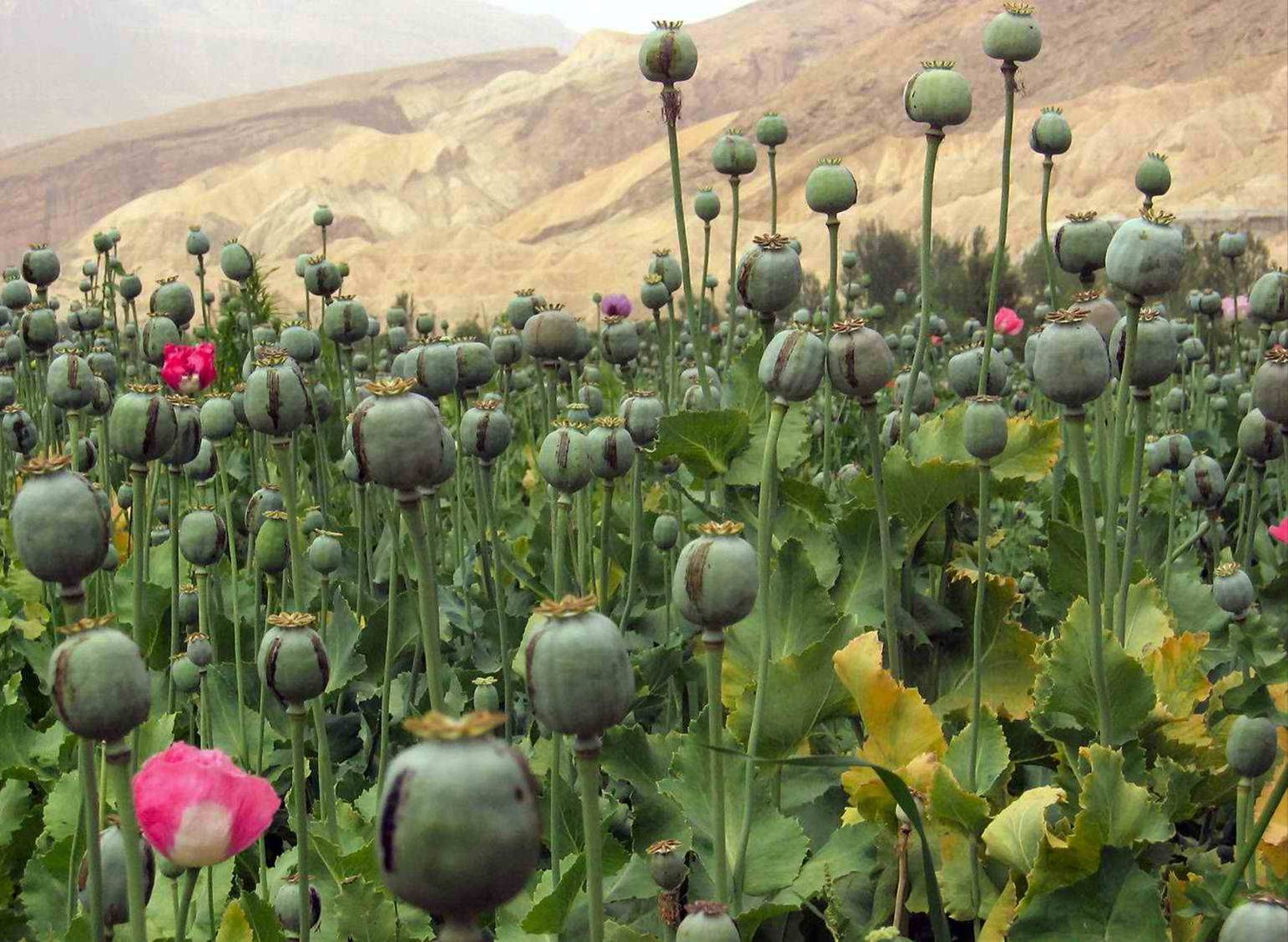
- Poppy field in Afghanistan
- Date: 19 December 2000
- Meeting no.: 4,251
- Code: S/RES/1333 (Document)
- Subject: The situation in Afghanistan
- Voting summary: 13 voted for; None voted against; 2 abstained
- Result: Adopted

Security Council composition
- Permanent members: China; France; Russia; United Kingdom; United States
- Non-permanent members: Argentina; Bangladesh; Canada; Jamaica; Malaysia; Mali; Namibia; Netherlands; Tunisia; Ukraine

United Nations Security Council resolution 1333, adopted on 19 December 2000, after recalling all resolutions on the situation in Afghanistan, including Resolution 1267 (1999), called for a ban of military assistance to the Taliban, closure of its camps and an end to the provision of sanctuary of the movement.

The key drivers behind the resolution were reportedly Russia and the US. During its deliberation and upon its adoption the resolution was criticized for unnecessarily endangering the lives of poverty- and drought-stricken ordinary Afghans and for undermining peace negotiations with the Taliban (see the Reactions section).

== Resolution ==
=== Observations ===
The security council recognised the critical humanitarian needs of the Afghan people. It supported the efforts of the secretary-general's Personal Representative to forward the peace process to establish a comprehensive, multi-ethnic and representative government. The training and sheltering of terrorists in areas controlled by the Taliban was condemned. At the same time, the sanctuary provided to Osama bin Laden was further condemned and an indictment against him by the United States was noted by the council. It was stressed that the kidnapping and murder of Iranian diplomats and journalists constituted a violation of international humanitarian law.

The resolution noted that the Taliban were involved in illegal opium cultivation and trafficking. There was also concern about human rights violations, particularly against women and girls.

=== Acts ===
Acting under Chapter VII of the United Nations Charter, the council demanded that the Taliban comply with Resolution 1267, cease support for terrorists, close training camps and end illegal drug activities. All countries were ordered to cease providing assistance, weapons and training to the Taliban; those that maintained diplomatic relations with the Taliban were asked to reconsider their relations and reduce the number of staff at Taliban missions. It was decided that all states were to close the offices of the Taliban and Ariana Afghan Airlines; freeze the assets of Osama bin Laden and those associated with him; prevent the supply of acetic anhydride; and prohibit aircraft to land, take off or overfly their territory if it had taken off and was to land in Taliban territory. The aircraft restrictions would not apply to humanitarian flights and the Committee of the Security Council was requested to maintain a list of approved humanitarian organisations providing humanitarian aid to Afghanistan. A travel ban was also imposed on senior Taliban officials which would not apply in religious or humanitarian circumstances.

The Secretary-General Kofi Annan was requested to report on all aspects of the situation in Afghanistan, including the implementation of sanctions against the Taliban. The committee was asked to establish and maintain lists related to different aspects of the sanctions regime against the Taliban, grant exceptions and report periodically on violations of the measures. In this regard, all countries were urged to co-operate with the committee and in the implementation of the sanctions. The measures would come into effect at 00:01 EST one month following the adoption of the current resolution for a period of 12 months. If the Council determined that the Taliban were complying with previous resolutions, some of the sanctions would be terminated; in the event of non-compliance, further measures would be considered.

== Reactions ==
The Russian- and American-backed resolution was criticised by the Secretary-General Kofi Annan as undermining peace negotiations with the Taliban. China and Malaysia abstained from the voting on Resolution 1333 after expressing concern that the sanctions would affect the Afghan population.

Afghanistan expert Barnett Rubin said that the resolution focused on American and Russian interests and had little relevance to Afghanistan's real problems. Human Rights Watch petitioned the UN Security Council not to impose a one-sided arms embargo in a situation where all participating sides were guilty of human rights violations.

== See also ==
- War in Afghanistan (1978–present)
- Civil war in Afghanistan (1992–1996)
- Civil war in Afghanistan (1996–2001)
- Human rights in Afghanistan
- List of United Nations Security Council Resolutions 1301 to 1400 (2000–2002)
- United Nations Special Mission to Afghanistan
