= List of international trips made by Hu Jintao =

This is a list of international trips made by Hu Jintao, the general secretary of the Chinese Communist Party and the president of China. Hu Jintao made international trips to 69 countries during his leadership from 2003 to 2012.

== Summary ==
The number of visits per country where he has travelled are:

- One visit to: Algeria, Argentina, Austria, Brunei, Cambodia, Cameroon, Chile, Costa Rica, Croatia, Denmark, Egypt, Gabon, Greece, Indonesia, Italy, Kenya, Kyrgyzstan, Laos, Liberia, Hungary, Malaysia, Mali, Mauritius, Mongolia, Morocco, Mozambique, Namibia, New Zealand, Nigeria, North Korea, Pakistan, Peru, the Philippines, Poland, Portugal, Romania, Senegal, Seychelles, Singapore, Slovakia, Spain, South Africa, Sudan, Sweden, Tajikistan, Tanzania, Thailand, Ukraine, Zambia.
- Two visits to: Australia, Brazil, Canada, Cuba, Germany, India, Mexico, Saudi Arabia, Turkmenistan, Uzbekistan, and Vietnam.
- Three visits to: Japan and the United Kingdom.
- Four visits to: France and South Korea.
- Seven visits to: Kazakhstan and the United States.
- Nine visits to: Russia.

World map highlighting countries visited by Hu Jintao during his leadership. One visit Two visits Three visits Four visits Five or more visits China

== 2003 ==
Country	Locations	Dates	Details	Image
Russia	Moscow; Saint Petersburg	26–31 May	State visit.	
Switzerland	Lausanne	1–2 June	Briefly stopped for transfit. Met with Swiss President Pascal Couchepin.	
France	Évian-les-Bains	1–2 June	Attended North-South Leaders’ Informal Dialogue Meeting. Met with US President George W. Bush, French President Jacques Chirac, Malaysian Prime Minister Mahathir Mohamad and International Olympic Committee President Jacques Rogge.	
Kazakhstan	Astana	2–4 June	State visit. Met with Kazakh President Nursultan Nazarbayev and Prime Minister Imangali Tasmagambetov.	
Mongolia	Ulaanbaatar	4–5 June	State visit. Met with Mongolian President Natsagiin Bagabandi and Prime Minister Nambaryn Enkhbayar.	
Thailand	Bangkok	17–22 October	Attended the 11th APEC meeting.	
Australia	Sydney; Canberra	22–25 October	State visit. Met with Australian Governor-General Michael Jeffery, Prime Minister John Howard, New South Wales Governor Marie Bashir, New South Wales Premier Bob Carr, and Labor Party leader Simon Crean. Gave a speech at the Parliament of Australia.	
New Zealand	Wellington; Auckland	25–27 October	State visit. Met with New Zealand Governor-General Silvia Cartwright, Prime Minister Helen Clark, and National Party leader Bill English.	

== 2004 ==
Country	Locations	Dates	Details	Image
France	Paris	26–29 January	State visit. Met with President Jacques Chirac and laid a wreath at the Tomb of the Unknown Soldier. Also met with United Nations Secretary-General Kofi Annan, French Prime Minister Jean-Pierre Raffarin and Senate President Christian Poncelet. Delivered a speech at the National Assembly.	
Egypt	Cairo	29 January–1 February	State visit. Met with President Hosni Mubarak and the Arab League Secretary-General Amr Moussa, as well as representatives from 22 members of the Arab League. Announced the formation of the China–Arab States Cooperation Forum.	
Gabon	Libreville	1–3 February	State visit. Met with President Omar Bongo and delivered a speech at the Parliament of Gabon.	
Algeria	Algiers	3–4 February	State visit. Met with President Abdelaziz Bouteflika and Prime Minister Ali Benflis.	
Poland	Warsaw	8–9 June	State visit. Met with President Aleksander Kwaśniewski, Prime Minister Marek Belka, Sejm Marshal Józef Oleksy, and Senate Marshal Longin Pastusiak.	
Hungary	Budapest	10–11 June	State visit. Met with President Ferenc Mádl.	
Romania	Constanța; Bucharest	12–13 June	State visit. Met with President Ion Iliescu.	
Uzbekistan	Tashkent	14–17 June	State visit. Met with President Islam Karimov. Also attended a summit of the Shanghai Cooperation Organization.	
Portugal	Porto	10–11 November	Arrived as a stopover before his trip to Latin America. Met with Prime Minister Pedro Santana Lopes.	
Brazil	Brasília	11–15 November	State visit. Met with President Luiz Inácio Lula da Silva, Federal Senate President José Sarney, and Chamber of Deputies President João Paulo Cunha. Also gave a speech at the National Congress.	
Argentina	Buenos Aires	16–17 November	State visit. Met with President Néstor Kirchner and Buenos Aires Mayor Aníbal Ibarra.	
Chile	Santiago	18–21 November	Attended the 12th APEC meeting.	
Cuba	Havana	22–23 November	State visit. Met with Council of State President Fidel Castro and Council of State First Vice President Raúl Castro.	
Spain	Gran Canaria	24 November	Stopped at Spain at the end of the trip to Latin America. Met with Crown Prince Felipe.	

== 2005 ==
Country	Locations	Dates	Details	Image
Brunei	Bandar Seri Begawan	20–21 April	State visit.	
Indonesia	Jakarta	22–26 April	State visit.	
Philippines	Manila	26–28 April	State visit.	
Russia	Moscow	8–9 May	Attended the 2005 Moscow Victory Day Parade.	
Kazakhstan	Astana	30 June–1 July	State visit.	
United Kingdom	Prestwick	7–8 July	Attended the first summit of G8+5.	
Canada	Ottawa	8–10 September	State visit. Met with Governor-General Adrienne Clarkson and Prime Minister Paul Martin.	
Mexico	Mexico City	11–12 September	State visit. Met with President Vicente Fox.	
United States	New York City	13 September	Visited the United Nations General Assembly. Met with President George W. Bush.	
North Korea	Pyongyang	28–30 October	Official goodwill visit. Met with General Secretary of the Workers' Party of Korea Kim Jong Il.	
Vietnam	Hanoi	31 October–2 November	Official goodwill visit. Met with Communist Party of Vietnam General Secretary Nông Đức Mạnh and President Trần Đức Lương.	
United Kingdom	London	8–9 November	State visit. Met with Queen Elizabeth II and Prime Minister Tony Blair.	
Germany	Berlin	10–12 November	State visit. Met with President Horst Köhler, outgoing Chancellor Gerhard Schröder, and incoming Chancellor Angela Merkel.	
Spain	Madrid	13–15 November	State visit. Met with King Juan Carlos I and Prime Minister José Luis Rodríguez Zapatero.	
South Korea	Seoul; Busan	16–19 November	Attended the 13th APEC meeting. Met with South Korean President Roh Moo-hyun and gave a speech at the National Assembly.	

== 2006 ==
Country	Locations	Dates	Details	Image
United States	Seattle; New Haven	20–21 April		
Saudi Arabia	Dammam; Riyadh	23–24 April	State visit. Met with King Abdullah and gave a speech to the Consultative Assembly.	
Morocco	Casablanca; Rabat	24–26 April	State visit. Met with King Mohammed VI.	
Nigeria	Abuja	26–27 April	State visit. Met with President Olusegun Obasanjo, Senate President Ken Nnamani, and House of Representatives Speaker Aminu Bello Masari. Also gave a speech at the National Assembly.	
Kazakhstan	Almaty	16–17 June		
Russia	Saint Petersburg	16–17 July		
Vietnam	Hanoi	15–19 November	Attended the 14th APEC meeting.	
Laos	Vientiane	19–20 November	State visit.	
India	New Delhi	20–23 November	State visit. Met with President A. P. J. Abdul Kalam and Prime Minister Manmohan Singh.	
Pakistan	Islamabad; Lahore	23–26 November	State visit. Met with President Pervez Musharraf and Prime Minister Shaukat Aziz.	

== 2007 ==
Country	Locations	Dates	Details	Image
United Arab Emirates	Dubai	30 January	Met with UAE Vice President and Prime Minister and Dubai Ruler Mohammed bin Rashid Al Maktoum.	
Cameroon	Yaoundé	31 January–1 February	State visit. Met with President Paul Biya, Prime Minister Ephraïm Inoni, and National Assembly President Cavayé Yéguié Djibril.	
Liberia	Monrovia	1–2 February	State visit. Met with President Ellen Johnson-Sirleaf.	
Sudan	Khartoum	2–3 February	State visit. Met with President Omar al-Bashir.	
Zambia	Lusaka	3–4 February	State visit. Met with President Levy Mwanawasa.	
Namibia	Windhoek	5–6 February	State visit. Met with President Hifikepunye Pohamba.	
South Africa	Pretoria	6–8 February	State visit. Met with President Thabo Mbeki.	
Mozambique	Maputo	8 February	State visit. Met with President Armando Guebuza.	
Seychelles	Victoria	9–10 February	State visit. Met with President James Michel.	
Russia	Moscow; Kazan	26–28 March	State visit. Met with President Vladimir Putin.	
Germany	Berlin; Heiligendamm; Rostock	6–8 June	State visit. Attended the summit of G8+5.	
Sweden	Stockholm	8–10 June	State visit.	
Kyrgyzstan	Bishkek	14–15 August	State visit. Met with President Kurmanbek Bakiyev. Also attended a summit of the Shanghai Cooperation Organization.	
Russia	Chelyabinsk	16–17 August	Visited to observe a SCO counterterrorism drill.	
Kazakhstan	Astana	18–19 August	State visit. Met with President Nursultan Nazarbayev.	
Australia	Sydney; Canberra	3–9 September	Attended the 15th APEC meeting.	

== 2008 ==
Country	Locations	Dates	Details	Image
Japan	Tokyo; Osaka	6–10 May	State visit.	
Japan	Tōyako; Sapporo	7–9 July	Attended the summit of G8+5.	
South Korea	Seoul	25–26 August	State visit.	
Tajikistan	Dushanbe	26–27 August	State visit. Met with President Emomali Rahmon. Also attended a summit of the Shanghai Cooperation Organization.	
Turkmenistan	Ashgabat	28–29 August	State visit. Met with President Gurbanguly Berdimuhamedow and laid a wreath at the Niyazov Memorial Hall.	
United States	Washington, D.C.	14–15 November	Attended the G20 summit.	
Costa Rica	San José	16–17 November	State visit. Met with President Óscar Arias.	
Cuba	Havana	17–18 November	State visit. Met with Communist Party of Cuba First Secretary Fidel Castro and Council of State President Raúl Castro.	
Peru	Lima	19–23 November	State visit. Met with President Alan Garcia. Also attended the 16th APEC meeting.	
Greece	Athens; Crete	24–26 November	State visit. Met with President Karolos Papoulias, Prime Minister Kostas Karamanlis, and Parliament Speaker Dimitris Sioufas. Also visited an agricultural cooperative in Crete.	

== 2009 ==
Country	Locations	Dates	Details	Image
Saudi Arabia	Riyadh	10–11 February	State visit. Met with King Abdullah and Gulf Cooperation Council Secretary-General Abdul Rahman Al-Attiya.	
Mali	Bamako	12–13 February	State visit. Met with President Amadou Toumani Touré.	
Senegal	Dakar	13–14 February	State visit. Met with President Abdoulaye Wade.	
Tanzania	Dar es Salaam	15–16 February	State visit. Met with President Jakaya Kikwete and Zanzibar President Amani Abeid Karume.	
Mauritius	Port Louis	16–17 February	State visit. Met with Prime Minister Navin Ramgoolam and President Anerood Jugnauth.	
United Kingdom	London	1–3 April	Attended the G20 summit.	
Russia	Yekaterinburg; Moscow	14–18 June	Attended a summit of the Shanghai Cooperation Organization. Also attended the 1st BRIC summit.	
Slovakia	Bratislava	18–19 June	State visit. Met with President Ivan Gašparovič and Prime Minister Robert Fico.	
Croatia	Zagreb	19–20 June	State visit. Met with President Stjepan Mesić, Prime Minister Ivo Sanader, and Parliament Speaker Luka Bebić.	
Italy	Milan	5–8 July	State visit. Originally scheduled to attend the summit of G8+5 but returned early due to the Ürümqi riots.	
United States	Pittsburgh; New York City	21–25 September	Visited the United Nations General Assembly. Met with US President Barack Obama. Attended the G20 summit.	
Malaysia	Kuala Lumpur	10–14 November	State visit.	
Singapore	Singapore	14–15 November	Attended the 17th APEC meeting.	
Kazakhstan	Astana	12–13 December	Working visit.	
Turkmenistan	Ashgabat	13–14 December	Working visit.	

== 2010 ==
Country	Locations	Dates	Details	Image
United States	Washington, D.C.	10–14 April	Attended the 1st Nuclear Security Summit.	
Brazil	Brasília	14–16 April	Attended the 2nd BRIC summit. Originally planned to visit Venezuela and Chile but the trips were cancelled due to the Yushu earthquake.	
Russia	Moscow	8–9 May	Attended the 2010 Moscow Victory Day Parade.	
Uzbekistan	Tashkent	9–11 June	State visit. Also attended a summit of the Shanghai Cooperation Organisation.	
Kazakhstan	Astana	11–12 June	State visit.	
Canada	London	23–27 June	Attended the G20 summit.	
France	Paris; Nice	4–6 November	State visit.	
Portugal	Lisbon	6–7 November	State visit.	
South Korea	Seoul	11–12 November	Attended the G20 summit.	
Japan	Tokyo	12–14 November	Attended the 18th APEC meeting.	

== 2011 ==
Country	Locations	Dates	Details	Image
United States	Washington, D.C. Chicago; Illinois	18–21 January	State visit.	
Kazakhstan	Astana	12–15 June	State visit. Also attended a summit of the Shanghai Cooperation Organization.	
Russia	Moscow; Saint Petersburg	15–18 June	Attended the 15th St. Petersburg International Economic Forum.	
Ukraine	Simferopol; Yalta; Kyiv	18–20 June	State visit.	
Austria	Vienna; Salzburg	30 October–2 November	State visit.	
France	Nice; Cannes	2–4 November	Attended the G20 summit.	
United States	Honolulu	10–14 November	Attended the 19th APEC meeting.	

== 2012 ==
Country	Locations	Dates	Details	Image
South Korea	Seoul	26–27 March	Attended the 2nd Nuclear Security Summit.	
India	New Delhi	28–29 March	Attended the 4th BRICS summit	
Cambodia	Phnom Penh	30 March–2 April	State visit. Met with Cambodian King Norodom Sihamoni, Senate President Chea Sim, National Assembly President Heng Samrin, and Prime Minister Hun Sen.	
Denmark	Copenhagen	14–16 June	State visit.	
Mexico	Los Cabos Municipality	16–19 June	Attended the G20 summit.	
Spain	Tenerife	20 June	Stopover before returning from the G20 summit. Met with Deputy Prime Minister Soraya Sáenz de Santamaría.	
Russia	Vladivostok	6–9 September	Attended the 20th APEC meeting.	

== See also ==
- List of international trips made by Jiang Zemin, his predecessor
- List of international trips made by Xi Jinping, his successor
