= Mutiny (disambiguation) =

Mutiny is a conspiracy to openly oppose, change or overthrow an authority to which the mutineers are subject.

Mutiny may also refer to:

== Film and television ==
- Mutiny (1925 film), a silent British film directed by Floyd Martin Thornton
- Mutiny (1928 film), a Soviet film directed by Semyon Tymoshenko
- Mutiny (1952 film), an American film directed by Edward Dmytryk on the War of 1812
- Mutiny (1999 film), a television drama film
- Mutiny (2001 film), a television film part of the Hornblower series
- Mutiny (2026 film), an action thriller film starring Jason Statham
- "Mutiny" (Falling Skies), an episode of the American science fiction TV series
- "Mutiny" (The Good Life)
- "Mutiny" (Space: Above and Beyond episode)
- "Mutiny", the 22nd episode of Code Lyoko: Evolution
- "The Mutiny" (Star Wars Resistance)

== Music ==
- Mutiny (band), Australian folk punk band
- Mutiny, U.S.-American funk band, see Jerome Brailey
- Mutiny! (musical), by David Essex, first recorded as a concept album in 1983, then performed with a cast recording released in 1985

=== Albums ===
- Mutiny (Too Much Joy album), 1992
- Mutiny! (Set Your Goals album), 2006

=== Songs ===
- "Mutiny", 1985 song by The Family from The Family
- "Mutiny", 2005 song by Parkway Drive from Killing with a Smile
- "Mutiny", 2008 song by Pendulum from In Silico
- "Mutiny", 1988 song by Running Wild from Port Royal
- "Mutiny!", 2006 song by Set Your Goals from Mutiny!

== Other uses ==
- Mutiny, a play by Christopher Bond
- Mutiny Collective, an Australian anarchist group based in Sydney
- Tampa Bay Mutiny, a professional soccer club

== See also ==
- Mutineer (disambiguation)
