= List of international presidential trips made by Susilo Bambang Yudhoyono =

This is a list of international presidential trips made by Susilo Bambang Yudhoyono, the 6th president of Indonesia. He conducted 86 foreign trips to 52 countries during his presidency, which began on 20 October 2004 and ended on 20 October 2014.

== Summary ==
The number of visits per country where he had travelled are:

- One visit to Cambodia, Canada, Chile, Cuba, Denmark, Ecuador, Fiji, Finland, Hong Kong, Hungary, Iran, Kazakhstan, Kuwait, Liberia, Mongolia, Myanmar, Netherlands, New Zealand, Nigeria, Papua New Guinea, Peru, Poland, Portugal, Qatar, Senegal, South Africa, Sweden, and Turkey
- Two visits to Egypt, France, Germany, India, Laos, Mexico, Norway, Pakistan, Timor-Leste, and United Kingdom
- Three visits to Brazil, China, Japan, Philippines, Russia, Saudi Arabia, and South Korea
- Four visits to Australia, United States, and Vietnam
- Five visits to Singapore, Thailand and United Arab Emirates
- Six visits to Malaysia

Map of international trips made by Susilo Bambang Yudhoyono as president (as of 2014): Visited 6 times Visited 5 times Visited 4 times Visited 3 times Visited 2 times Visited 1 time Indonesia

== 2004 ==
#	Dates	Country	Locations	Details
1	12–13 November	Laos	Vientiane	SBY attended his first ASEAN Summit.
1	18–23 November	Chile	Santiago	SBY attended APEC Chile 2004 as his first international conference.

== 2005 ==
#	Dates	Country	Locations	Details
2	3–5 April	Australia	Canberra	SBY attended bilateral talks with Australian PM John Howard to discuss Social Protection,foreign ministry program and transportation.
2	5–7 April	New Zealand	Wellington	SBY attended bilateral talks with New Zealand PM Helen Clark, discussing cooperation in trade, labor and defense.
2	7–9 April	Timor-Leste	Dili	SBY attended bilateral talks with President Xanana Gusmao, discussing land boundaries, cooperation in security, education and economics,.
3	25–27 May	United States	Washington, D.C.	SBY visited Japan to engage in talks with President George W. Bush Discussion about ending embargo.
3	27–28 May	Japan	Tokyo	SBY conducted bilateral talks with Japan Prime Minister Junichiro Koizumi in Tokyo, discussing economic cooperation and infrastructure development.
3	28–30 May	Vietnam	Hanoi	SBY attended bilateral talks with Vietnam PM Phan Văn Khải.
4	20-22 June	Philippines	Manila	SBY made a state visit to the Philippines. Welcomed by Vice President Noli de Castro at Ninoy Aquino International Airport. The next day, he met with President Gloria Macapagal Arroyo at Malacanang Palace.
5	10-17 September	United States	New York City	SBY made a state visit to the US to attend the UN General Assembly in New York and met with Malaysian Prime Minister Abdullah Ahmad Badawi, Thai Prime Minister Thaksin Shinawatra, British Prime Minister Tony Blair, South African President Thabo Mbeki, Argentine President Néstor Kirchner, Australian Prime Minister John Howard, and Dutch Prime Minister Jan Peter Balkenende. Besides, he welcomed visits from US Secretary of State Condoleezza Rice, UN Secretary General Kofi Annan and World Bank President Paul Wolfowitz. SBY also witnessed the signing of a cooperation agreement between the Indonesia Stock Exchange and the New York Stock Exchange. In Saint Louis, SBY was awarded an honorary doctorate in law from Webster University.
6	17-20 November	South Korea	Busan	SBY departed for South Korea to attend the APEC summit in Busan and was planned to hold a number of meetings, including meetings with South Korean President Roh Moo-Hyun, US President George W Bush, Russian President Vladimir Putin, and Singaporean PM Lee Hsien Loong.
6	21-24 November	India	New Delhi	Next, SBY departed for India and met Indian President APJ Abdul Kalam and Prime Minister Manmohan Singh at Rashtrapati Bhavan, The visit aimed to increase cooperation in the economic and defense sectors of the two nations.
6	24 -26 November	Pakistan	Islamabad	SBY departed for Pakistan and met with Pakistani President Pervez Musharraf, signing an agreement on closer economic cooperation.
7	11-14 December	Malaysia	Kuala Lumpur	SBY attended the ASEAN Summit and the East Asia Summit.
7	15-17 December	Thailand	Bangkok	SBY visited Thailand and met with Thai Prime Minister Thaksin Shinawatra, had an audience with Thai King Bhumibol Adulyadej, met with CEOs of major Thai companies, and reviewed agribusiness projects. In between this visit, the President also received an Honorary Doctorate in Political Science from Thammasat University.

== Multilateral meetings ==
The following multilateral meetings were scheduled to take place during SBY 2004–2014 term in office.

Group	Year										
Group	2004	2005	2006	2007	2008	2009	2010	2011	2012	2013	2014
APEC											
EAS (ASEAN)											
Others	None										
██ = Did / will not attend ██ = Event cancelled
