= List of international trips made by Jiang Zemin =

This is a list of international trips made by Jiang Zemin, the general secretary of the Chinese Communist Party and the president of China. Jiang Zemin made international trips to 72 countries during his leadership from 1990 to 2002.

== Summary ==
The number of visits per country where he has travelled are:

- One visit to: Algeria, Argentina, Australia, Austria, Belarus, Brunei, Cambodia, Canada, Chile, Estonia, Ethiopia, Finland, Greece, Hungary, Iceland, India, Indonesia, Iran, Israel, Italy, Kenya, Kyrgyzstan, Laos, Latvia, Libya, Lithuania, Mali, Malta, Moldova, Mongolia, Morocco, Myanmar, Namibia, Nepal, Nigeria, Norway, Pakistan, the Philippines, Romania, Saudi Arabia, Singapore, South Africa, South Korea, the Soviet Union, Spain, the State of Palestine, Switzerland, Tajikistan, Thailand, Tunisia, Turkey, Turkmenistan, the United Kingdom, Uruguay, Uzbekistan, Venezuela, and Zimbabwe.
- Two visits to: Brazil, Cuba, France, Egypt, Germany, Mexico, North Korea, Portugal, Ukraine, and Vietnam
- Three visits to: Japan, Kazakhstan, and Malaysia.
- Five visits to: the United States.
- Six visits to: Russia.

World map highlighting countries visited by Jiang Zemin during his leadership. One visit Two visits Three visits Four visits Five visits Six or more visits China

== 1990–1992 ==
On 24 June 1989, Jiang Zemin was appointed as General Secretary of the Chinese Communist Party, the top position in China.

Country	Locations	Dates	Details
North Korea	Pyongyang	14–16 March 1990	Goodwill visit. Met with General Secretary of the Workers' Party of Korea Kim Il Sung, Premier Yon Hyong-muk. and Vice presidents Ri Jong-ok and Pak Song-chol.
Soviet Union	Moscow; Leningrad	15–19 May 1991	Official visit. Met with General Secretary of the Communist Party of the Soviet Union Mikhail Gorbachev
Japan	Tokyo; Osaka; Fukuoka	6–10 April 1992	Goodwill visit.

== 1993 ==
On 27 March 1993, Jiang Zemin was appointed as President of the People's Republic of China.

Country	Locations	Dates	Details
United States	San Francisco; Seattle	17–21 November	Attended the 5th APEC meeting.
Cuba	Havana	21–22 November	Stopover in way to Brazil. Met with Council of State President Fidel Castro.
Brazil	Brasília; Foz do Iguaçu; São José; São Paulo; Rio de Janeiro; Manaus	22–28 November	State visit. Met with President Itamar Franco.
Portugal	Lisbon	28–29 November	Originally planned to be a stopover visit, the Portuguese government took the initiative to upgrade it into a drop-over visit.

== 1994 ==
Country	Locations	Dates	Details
Russia	Moscow; Yekaterinburg	2–6 September	State Visit
Ukraine	Kyiv	6–8 September	State Visit
France	Paris	8–12 September	State Visit
Singapore		8–10 November	Met with President Ong Teng Cheong and Prime Minister Lee Kuan Yew.
Malaysia	Kuala Lumpur	10–14 November	
Indonesia	Jakarta	November	Attended the 6th APEC meeting.
Vietnam	Hanoi	20–23 November	Official goodwill visit.

== 1995 ==
Country	Locations	Dates	Details
Russia	Moscow	8–9 May	Attended the 1995 Moscow Victory Day Parade.
Finland	Helsinki	5–8 July	
Hungary	Budapest	8–11 July	
Germany	Stuttgart; Bonn; Essen; Munich	11–15 July	
United States	New York City	21–25 October	
South Korea	Seoul; Busan; Gyeongju; Jeju City	13–17 November	
Japan	Osaka	17–20 November	Attended the 7th APEC meeting.

== 1996 ==
Country	Locations	Dates	Details
Kenya	Nairobi	8–11 May	
Ethiopia	Addis Ababa	11–13 May	
Egypt	Cairo	13–16 May	Met with President Hosni Mubarak and Arab League Secretary-General Ahmed Asmat Abdel-Meguid.
Mali	Bamako	17–18 May	Met with President Alpha Oumar Konaré, Prime Minister Ibrahim Boubacar Keïta and National Assembly President Aly Nouhoum Diallo.
Namibia	Windhoek	18–20 May	
Zimbabwe	Harare	21–22 May	Met with President Robert Mugabe.
Spain	La Palma; Madrid	23–27 June	
Norway	Oslo	27–29 June	
Romania	Bucharest	29 June–2 July	
Uzbekistan	Tashkent	2–3 July	
Kyrgyzstan	Bishkek	3–4 July	
Kazakhstan	Almaty	4–6 July	
Philippines	Manila	23–28 November	State visit. Met with President Fidel V. Ramos. Also attended the 8th APEC meeting.
India	New Delhi	28 November–1 December	State visit. Met with President Shankar Dayal Sharma, Vice President K. R. Narayanan, Prime Minister H. D. Deve Gowda, Lok Sabha Speaker P. A. Sangma, and Indian National Congress President Sitaram Kesri.
Pakistan	Islamabad; Lahore	1–4 December	State visit. Met with President Farooq Leghari, Caretaker Prime Minister Malik Meraj Khalid, Senate chairman Wasim Sajjad, Punjab Governor Khawaja Tariq Rahim and Caretaker Punjab Chief Minister Mian Muhammad Afzal Hayat.
Nepal	Kathmandu	4–5 December	State visit. Met with King Birendra and Prime MInister Sher Bahadur Deuba.

== 1997 ==
Country	Locations	Dates	Details
Russia	Moscow	22–27 April	State visit. Met with President Boris Yeltsin. Signed the Treaty on Reduction of Military Forces in Border Regions.
United States	Washington, D.C. Honolulu; Williamsburg; Philadelphia; New York City; Boston; Los Angeles	26 October–3 November	State visit.
Canada	Ottawa; Toronto; Calgary	23–29 November	Attended the 9th APEC meeting.
Mexico	Cancún; Mexico City	29 November–3 December	
Canada	Vancouver	3 December	Transit.
Malaysia	Kuala Lumpur	14–17 December	

== 1998 ==
Country	Locations	Dates	Details
Kazakhstan	Almaty	3–4 July	Working visit. Attended a five-nation meeting between China, Kazakhstan, Kyrgyzstan Russia and Tajikistan
Malaysia	Kuala Lumpur	15–19 November	State visit. Met with Prime Minister Mahathir Mohamad. Also attended the 10th APEC meeting.
Russia	Moscow; Novosibirsk	22–25 November	Held and informal talk with President Boris Yeltsin. Also visited the Novosibirsk Science City.
Japan	Tokyo; Sendai; Sapporo	25–30 November	State visit. Met with Emperor Akihito and Empress Michiko.

== 1999 ==
Country	Locations	Dates	Details
Italy	Venice; Rome; Milan	20–25 March	State visit. Met with President Oscar Luigi Scalfaro.
Switzerland	Geneva; Zürich	25–27 March	State visit. Met with President Ruth Dreifuss.
Austria	Vienna; Salzburg	27–30 March	State visit. Met with President Thomas Klestil.
Mongolia	Ulaanbaatar	15–17 July	State visit. Met with President Natsagiin Bagabandi.
Thailand	Bangkok; Phuket	2–6 September	State visit. Met with King Bhumibol Adulyadej.
Australia	Melbourne; Canberra; Sydney; Cairns	6–11 September	
New Zealand	Auckland; Wellington; Christchurch	11–16 September	Attended the 11th APEC meeting
United Kingdom	London Cambridge	18–22 October	State visit. Met with Queen Elizabeth II. Also gave a speech at the University of Cambridge.
France	Lyon; Corrèze; Paris	22–26 October	State visit.
Portugal	Lisbon; Porto	26–27 October	State visit.
Morocco	Rabat; Casablanca	27–30 October	State visit.
Algeria	Algiers	30–31 October	State visit.
Saudi Arabia	Dammam; Riyadh	31 October–3 November	State visit. Met with King Fahd bin Abdulaziz.

== 2000 ==
Country	Locations	Dates	Details
Israel	Tel Aviv; Jerusalem	12–15, 16–17 April	State visit. Met with President Ezer Weizman and Prime Minister Ehud Barak.
Palestine	Bethlehem	15–16 April	State visit.
Egypt	Alexandria	17–18 April	Met with President Hosni Mubarak.
Turkey	Ankara; Istanbul	18–20 April	State visit. Met with President Süleyman Demirel and Prime Minister Bülent Ecevit.
Greece	Athens; Crete	21–23 April	State visit.
South Africa	Johannesburg; Pretoria; Cape Town	24–27 April	State visit.
Tajikistan	Dushanbe	3–5 July	State visit. Met with President Emomali Rahmon. Attended a five-nation meeting between China, Kazakhstan, Kyrgyzstan Russia and Tajikistan
Turkmenistan	Ashgabat	5–7 July	State visit. Met with President Saparmurat Niyazov.
United States	New York City	4–10 September	Attended the United Nations Millennium Summit.
Laos	Vientiane	11–13 November	State visit. Met with President Khamtai Siphandone, Prime Minister Sisavath Keobounphanh, and National Assembly President Samane Vignaket.
Cambodia	Phnom Penh; Siem Reap	13–14 November	State visit. Met with King Norodom Sihanouk, Prime Minister Hun Sen, Senate President Chea Sim, and National Assembly President Norodom Ranariddh.
Brunei	Bandar Seri Begawan	14–18 November	State visit. Met with Sultan Hassanal Bolkiah. Also attended the 12th APEC meeting.

== 2001 ==
Country	Locations	Dates	Details
French Polynesia	Tahiti	4 April	Transit.
Chile	San Diego	5–7 April	State visit. Met with President Ricardo Lagos and Senate President Andrés Zaldívar.
Argentina	Buenos Aires	7–10 April	State visit. Met with President Fernando de la Rúa, Senate Provisional President Mario Losada and Chamber of Deputies President Rafael Pascual.
Uruguay	Montevideo	10–11 April	State visit. Met with President Jorge Batlle.
Brazil	Brasília	11–12 April	Working visit. Met with President Fernando Henrique Cardoso.
Cuba	Havana	12–15 April	State visit. Met with Council of State President Fidel Castro.
Venezuela	Caracas	15–17 April	State visit. Met with President Hugo Chávez.
Spain	Gran Canaria	18 April	Transit.
Russia	Moscow; Volgograd	15–18 July	State visit. Met with President Vladimir Putin, Prime Minister Mikhail Kasyanov, State Duma chairman Gennadiy Seleznyov, Federation Council chairman Yegor Stroyev, and Volgograd Oblast Nikolay Maksyuta. Also met with International Olympics Committee President Juan Antonio Samaranch and former president Boris Yeltsin. Gave a speech at the Moscow State University.
Belarus	Minsk	18–19 July	State visit. Met with President Alexander Lukashenko, Prime Minister Vladimir Yermoshin, Council of the Republic Speaker Alyaksandr Vaytovich, and House of Representatives Speaker Anatoly Malofeyev.
Moldova	Chișinău	19–20 July	State visit. Met with President Vladimir Voronin, Prime Minister Vasile Tarlev, and Parliament President Eugenia Ostapciuc.
Ukraine	Kyiv; Yalta	20–23 July	State visit. Met with President Leonid Kuchma, Prime Minister Anatoliy Kinakh, and Verkhovna Rada chairman Ivan Plyushch.
Malta	Valletta	23–25 July	State visit. Met with President Guido de Marco.
North Korea	Pyongyang	3–5 September	Official goodwill visit. Met with North Korean leader Kim Jong Il, Supreme Assembly Presidium President Kim Yong-nam, and Premier Hong Song-nam. Paid respect to late North Korean leader Kim Il Sung and laid wreaths at the Sino–Korean Friendship Tower.
Myanmar	Yangon; Rakhine State; Bagan; Mandalay	12–15 December	State visit. Met with State Peace and Development Council (SPDC) Chairman Than Shwe and SPDC Secretary Khin Nyunt.

== 2002 ==
Country	Locations	Dates	Details
Vietnam	Hanoi; Huế; Da Nang; Hội An	27 February–1 March	Official goodwill visit. Met with Communist Party of Vietnam General Secretary Nông Đức Mạnh, President Trần Đức Lương, Prime Minister Phan Văn Khải, and National Assembly chairman Nguyễn Văn An. Gave a speech at the Vietnam National University. Also met with former general secretaries Đỗ Mười and Lê Khả Phiêu
Germany	Berlin; Potsdam; Dresden; Wolfsburg; Goslar; Hanover	8–13 April	State visit. Met with President Johannes Rau and Chancellor Gerhard Schröder.
Libya	Tripoli	13–14 April	State visit. Met with Libyan leader Muammar Gaddafi.
Nigeria	Abuja	14–16 April	State visit. Met with President Olusegun Obasanjo.
Tunisia	Tunis	16–18 April	State visit. Met with President Zine El Abidine Ben Ali, Prime Minister Mohamed Ghannouchi, and Chamber of Deputies Speaker Fouad Mebazaa.
Iran	Shiraz; Tehran	18–22 April	State visit. Met with Supreme Leader Ali Khamenei, President Muhammad Khatami, Islamic Consultative Assembly Speaker Mehdi Karroubi, Expediency Discernment Council chairman Akbar Rafsanjanī, and Governor-General of the Fars Province.
Kazakhstan	Almaty	3–5 June	Attended the Conference on Interaction and Confidence-Building Measures in Asia.
Russia	Saint Petersburg; Sochi	5–10 June	Attended the 2nd Shanghai Cooperation Organization Heads of State summit.
Latvia	Riga	10–12 June	State visit. Met with President Vaira Vīķe-Freiberga, Prime Minister Andris Bērziņš, and Saeima Speaker Jānis Straume.
Estonia	Tallinn	12–13 June	State visit. Met with President Arnold Rüütel, Prime Minister Juhan Parts, and Riigikogu chairman Toomas Savi.
Iceland	Reykjavík	13–16 June	State visit. Met with President Ólafur Ragnar Grímsson and Prime Minister Davíð Oddsson.
Lithuania	Vilnius	16–18 June	State visit. Met with President Valdas Adamkus, Prime Minister Algirdas Brazauskas, and Seimas Speaker Artūras Paulauskas.
United States	Chicago; Houston; Crawford; Waco; San Francisco	22–25 October	Working visit. Met with Illinois Governor George Ryan and US President George W. Bush. Gave a speech at the George Bush Presidential Library.
Mexico	Los Cabos Municipality	25–28 October	Attended the 10th APEC meeting.

== See also ==
- List of international trips made by Hu Jintao, his successor
