= Mutineer =

A mutineer is a person guilty of mutiny.

Mutineer or Mutineers may also refer to:

- The Mutineers, original name of the Five Americans, a 1960s American rock band
- Mutineer (album), a 1995 album and song by Warren Zevon
- Mutineers (album), a 2014 album by David Gray
- The Mutineers (film), a 1949 American adventure film
- Florida Mutineers, original name of the Miami Heretics esports team
