= Mutiny Collective =

Anarchist collective in Sydney, Australia

The Mutiny Collective is an anarchist collective in Sydney, Australia made notorious in the media after the 2006 G20 summit meeting in Melbourne in November 2006, when protest organiser Marcus Greville accused Mutiny and the Arterial Bloc of being responsible for the confrontations with police. In the lead up to the APEC Australia 2007 meeting in Sydney in September, New South Wales Police Minister David Campbell accused Mutiny of preparing a training manual in violence and used this as justification for the strong security presence at APEC.

== Background ==
The Mutiny Collective came together as an anarchist collective interested in direct action anti-war protest after the invasion and occupation of Iraq in 2003 and has organised or participated in a number of protests against corporations involved in the war in Iraq, including office occupations. The collective has participated in conferences such as the Sydney Social Forum in 2004, presenting papers or workshops on topics such as Profiting from the reconstruction of Iraq, Re-colonising the Pond: Australia, New Zealand, and the G20's shadow over the Pacific, and How Australian imperialism in the region fits into a neo-liberal context. Since early 2006 Mutiny have published a monthly zine, called Mutiny - A Paper of Anarchistic Ideas and Actions, exploring Australian imperialism, disobedience and resistance in the Pacific.

== Smear Campaign ==
In an open letter by the Mutiny collective in May 2007, the group said that it had been "smeared by the corporate media and much of the left for action at the g20 summit". The comments by Marcus Greville that allegedly implicated Mutiny in the confrontations with the police and blamed the violence on anarchists at the G20 protests were broadcast on ABC radio:

"The names of the groups are Arterial Bloc and a group called Mutiny." he said adding that "Above and beyond that, we don't have any information, because they organised externally to us."

were picked up widely by the media, as well as by conservative Christian NSW MP Reverend Fred Nile, who told the NSW parliament that "Organisers of the G20 protest said that members of Mutiny and Arterial Bloc were responsible for the violence." The Mutiny Collective made it clear in that open letter that they were not "planning so-called 'violent protest' or know of some secret plans. We have no idea. Preparing for APEC protests has not been a priority for us as a group."

The open letter was part of the discussion on protest tactics with regard to civil disobedience and possible confrontation with the police at APEC protests. According to a Green Left report of a Stop Bush Coalition meeting on 30 April "members of the anarchist group Mutiny, the student-based Solidarity group and the International Socialist Organisation argued for, and won, a motion to remove the line 'Join the peaceful protest at APEC' from a poster advertising the rally." The motion was opposed by members of Resistance, the Socialist Alliance and Socialist Alternative.

Anarchist and autonomist activists had organised a conference/workshop in Sydney to coincide with the APEC meeting, F.L.A.R.E. in the Void convergence 4–9 September 2007. Five of the organisers of this conference were placed on the police excluded person list for APEC declared areas. A manual was published in association with the convergence detailing the "why and how of affinity groups, Forming affinity groups, Developing Shared intent, Hands on blockading and defence against police violence, and Practice scenarios", and also containing information on basic safety precautions for protests taken from manuals produced in North America and Europe. The Daily Telegraph reported the manual advised protestors of how "to wear gas masks, goggles, running shoes and full-body clothing to protect from tear gas and capsicum spray. It also advises carrying water and a bandanna soaked in vinegar to combat the effects of pepper spray." The Mutiny collective contributed one article to the manual in which they were quoted by the Daily Telegraph "It is important to defy police attempts to frighten us,"

New South Wales Police Minister David Campbell used the FLARE in the Void convergence manual as justification for strong security presence at APEC "The fact that this group called Mutiny have distributed a violent protests step-by-step guide I think demonstrates what police have known all along - that there were people intent on violent behaviour at APEC," One of the organisers of FLARE in the Void, Lou Thatcher, replied in an interview with The Sydney Morning Herald "[The manual] is clearly being used in a manipulative and false way as part of a fear campaign,"

== Arms fair cancelled ==
In 2008 Mutiny was one of several peace and antiwar groups planning to protest and disrupt the Asia-Pacific Defence and Security Exhibition to be held in Adelaide on 11 November 2008. Acting South Australian Premier Kevin Foley announced the cancellation of the military arms fair saying "The decision was taken that the cost of security, the possible threats of violence, were risks that the organisers of the event and the Government agreed were not worth proceeding with." He also accused all the intending protestors of being "these feral anarchists": "These are feral, low-life people who want society to be in a state of near anarchy for their perverse pleasure," he said.
