= APEC South Korea 2005 =

Asia-Pacific Economic Cooperation meeting

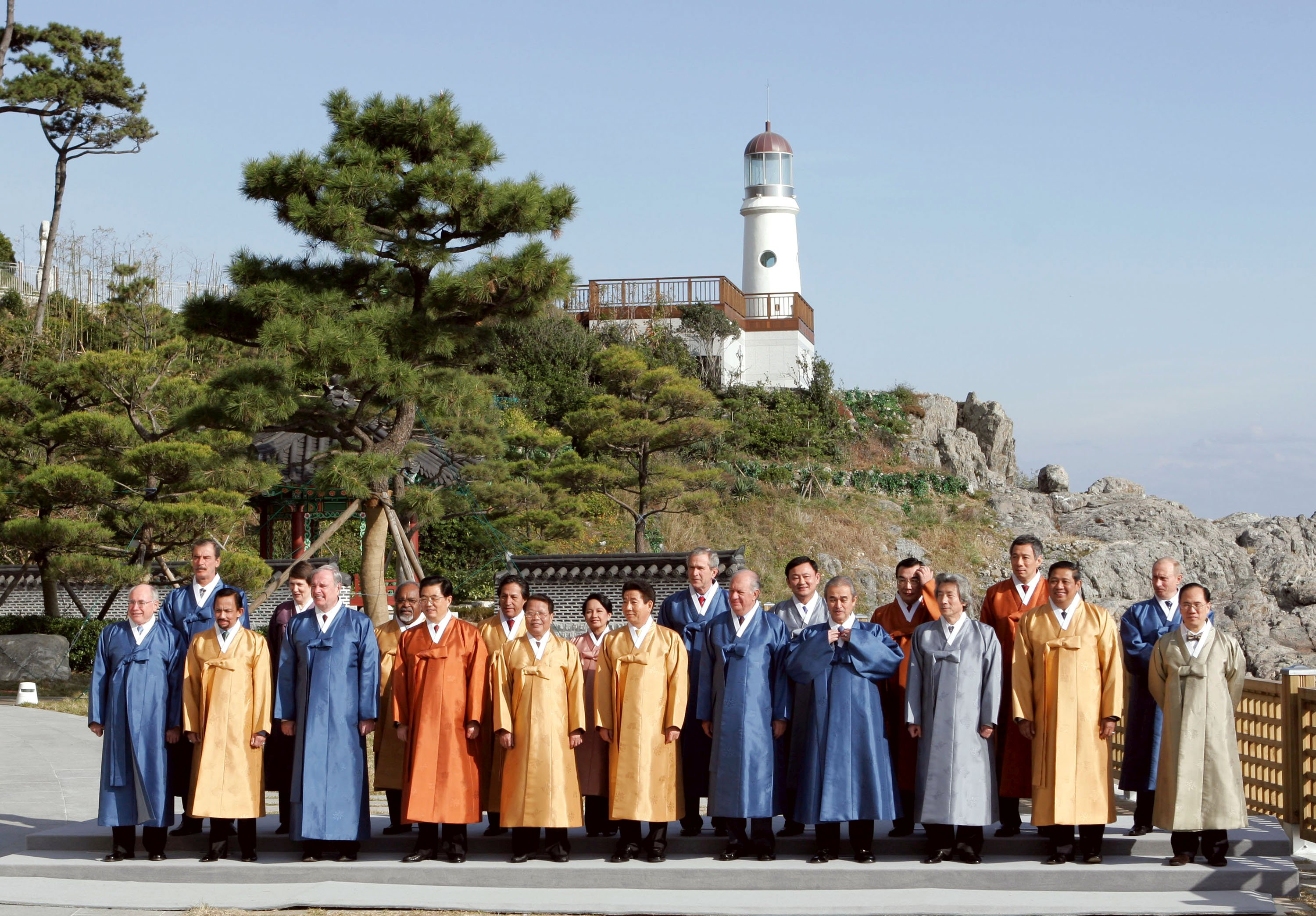
- APEC South Korea 2005 delegates
- Host country: South Korea
- Date: 18–19 November
- Motto: Towards One Community: Meet the Challenge and Make the Change
- Venues: Busan
- Follows: APEC Chile 2004
- Precedes: APEC Vietnam 2006
- Website: apec2005.org (archived)

APEC South Korea 2005 was a series of political and economic meetings held across South Korea in 2005 involving the 21 member economies of the Asia-Pacific Economic Cooperation (APEC). The culminating event was the APEC Economic Leaders' Meeting, held on 18–19 November 2005 in Busan, where leaders discussed regional economic cooperation and trade issues.

== Theme ==
The theme of the summit–Towards One Community: Meet the Challenge and Make the Change represents the strenuous will of APEC Member Economies to achieve the vision to build one "economic community" in the Asia-Pacific region.

== Logo ==
The APEC South Korea 2005 logo resembles South Korea's traditional Tri-Taegeuk mark which represents the unity and harmony of heaven, earth and man, the wave of Busan – the venue for the APEC 2005 Leaders' Meeting and the image of the Pacific Ocean encircled by APEC Member Economies.

Preceded by APEC Chile 2004	APEC meetings 2005	Succeeded by APEC Vietnam 2006
