= APEC Vietnam 2006 =

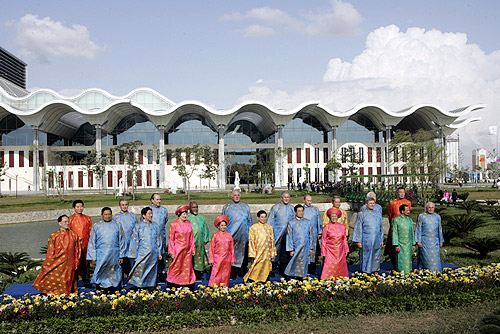
- APEC Vietnam 2006 delegates
- Host country: Vietnam
- Date: 18–19 November
- Motto: Towards a Dynamic Community for Sustainable Development and Prosperity
- Venues: Hanoi
- Follows: APEC South Korea 2005
- Precedes: APEC Australia 2007
- Website: apec2006.vn (archived)

APEC Vietnam 2006 was a series of political meetings held around Vietnam between the 21 member economies of the Asia-Pacific Economic Cooperation during 2006. Leaders from all the member countries met from 18 to 19 November 2006 in Hanoi. Notable objectives that APEC Vietnam 2006 aimed to achieve included advancing free trade and investments, enhancing human security and building stronger societies and a more dynamic and harmonious community. The theme surrounding this APEC meeting was towards a dynamic community for sustainable development and prosperity.

== Participating leaders ==
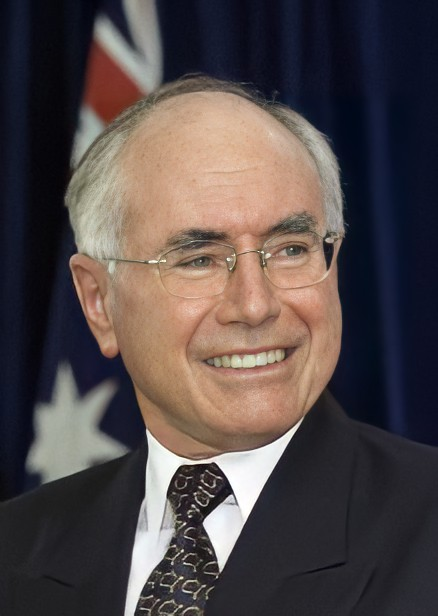
Australia
John Howard,
Prime Minister

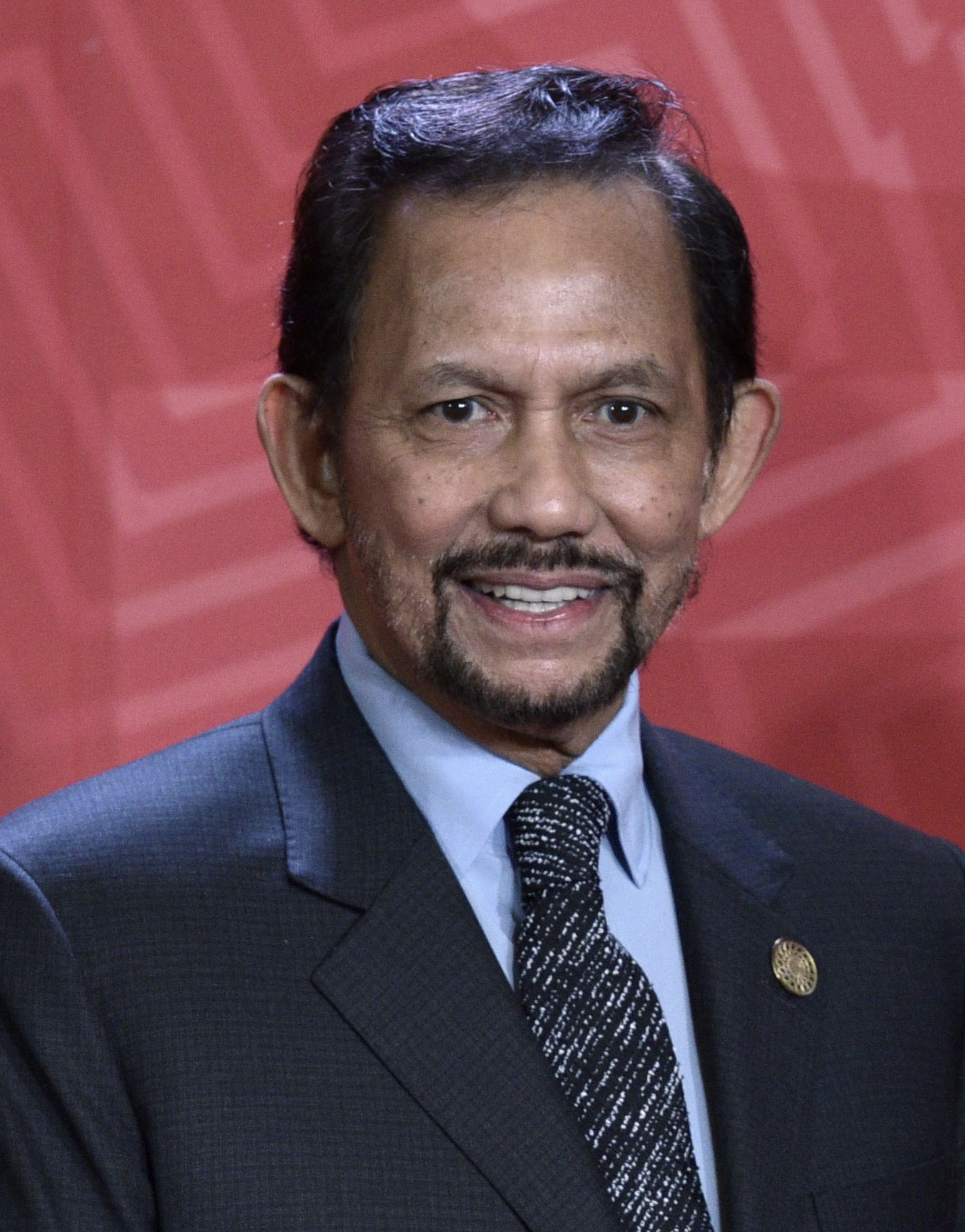
Brunei
Hassanal Bolkiah,
Sultan

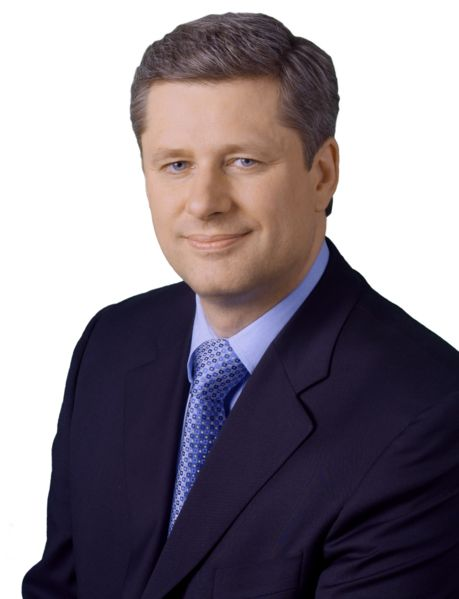
Canada
Stephen Harper,
Prime Minister

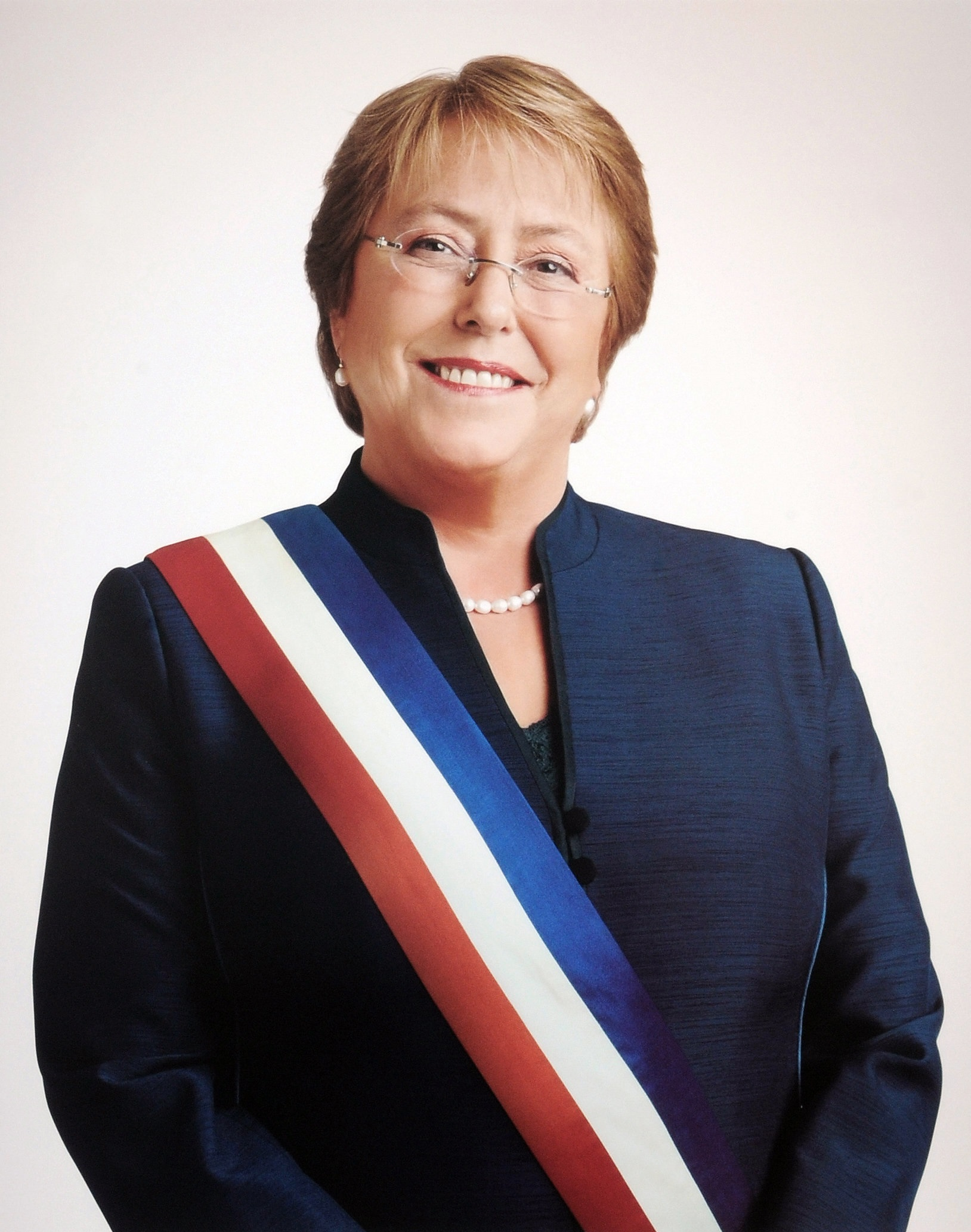
Chile
Michelle Bachelet,
President

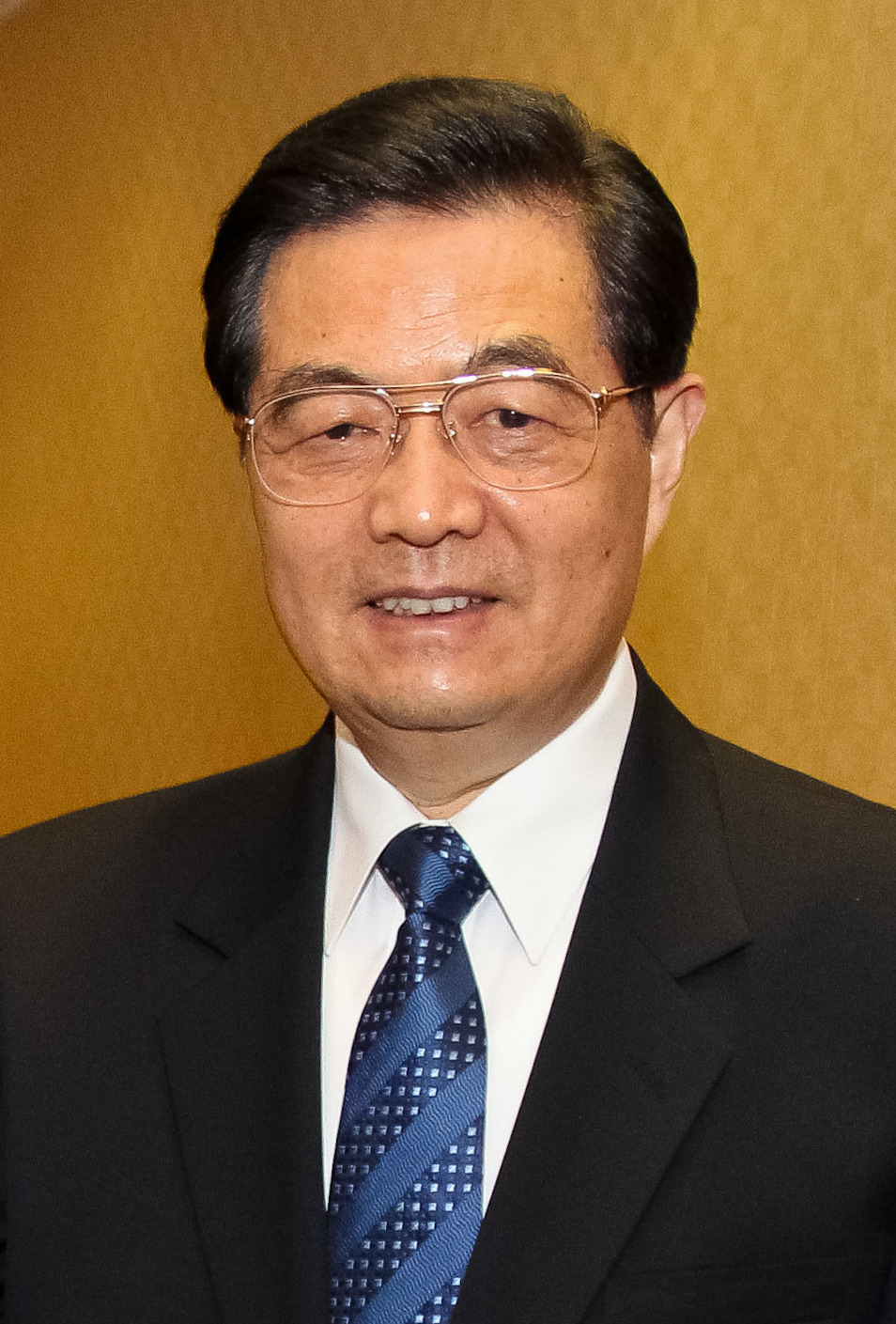
China
Hu Jintao,
CCP General Secretary and President (Note: The president of China is legally a ceremonial office, but the general secretary of the Chinese Communist Party (de facto leader in one-party communist state) has always held this office since 1993 except for the months of transition.)

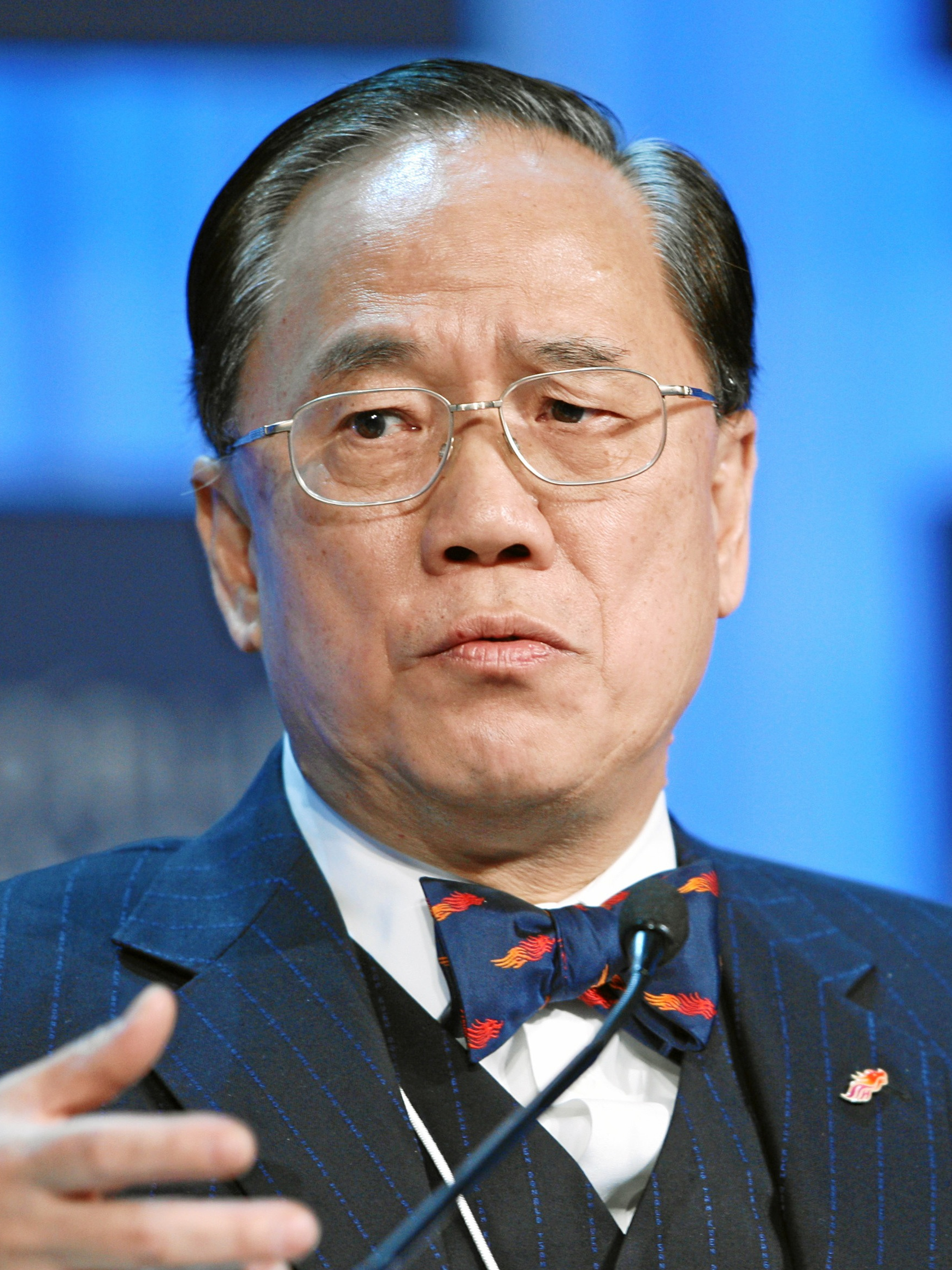
Hong Kong
Donald Tsang,
Chief Executive

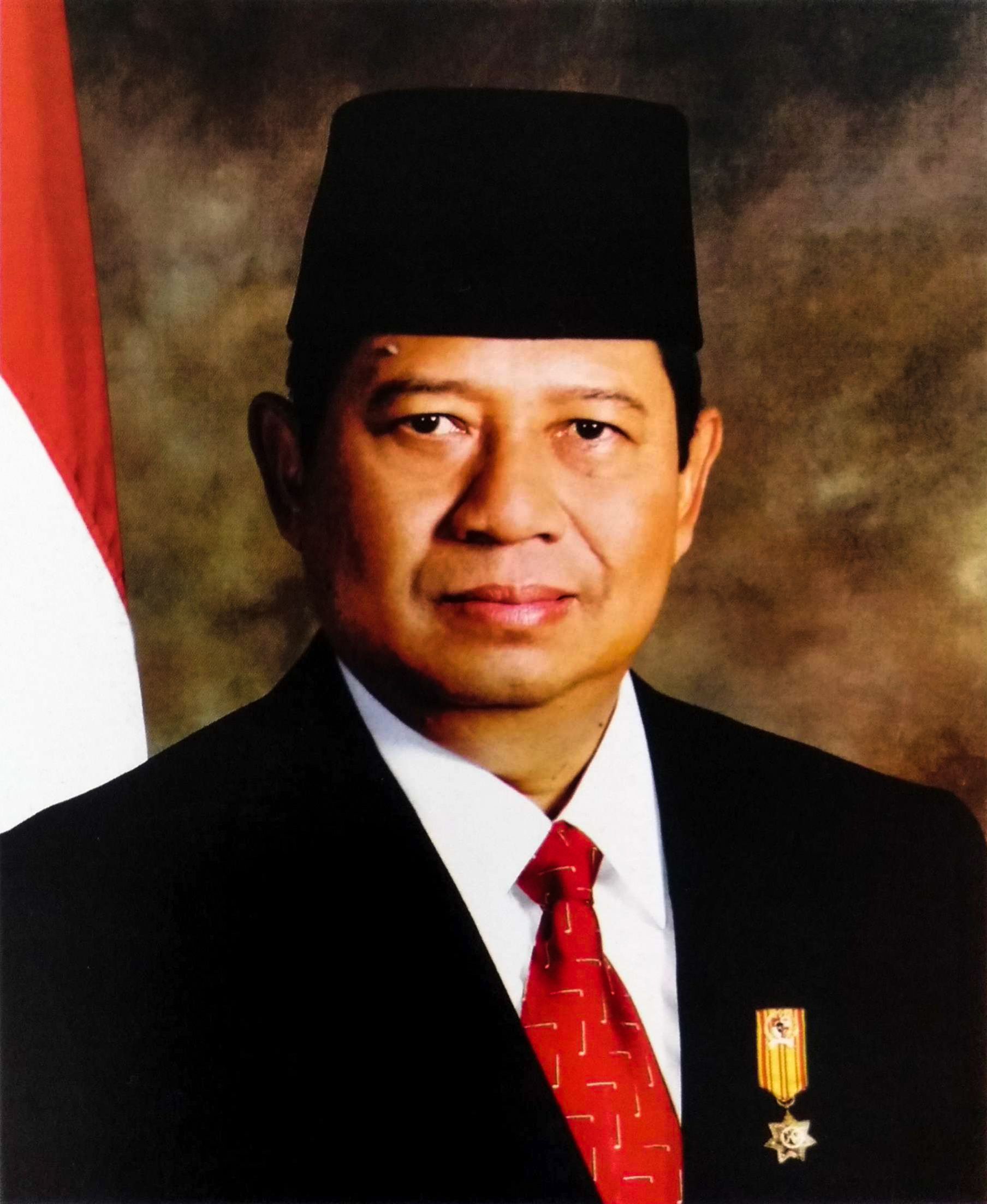
Indonesia
Susilo Bambang Yudhoyono,
President

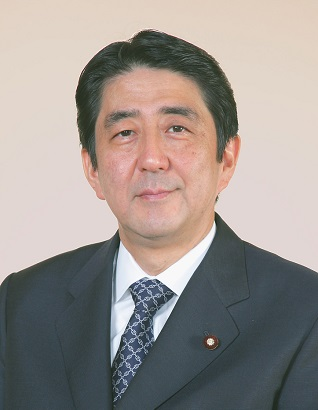
Japan
Shinzo Abe,
Prime Minister

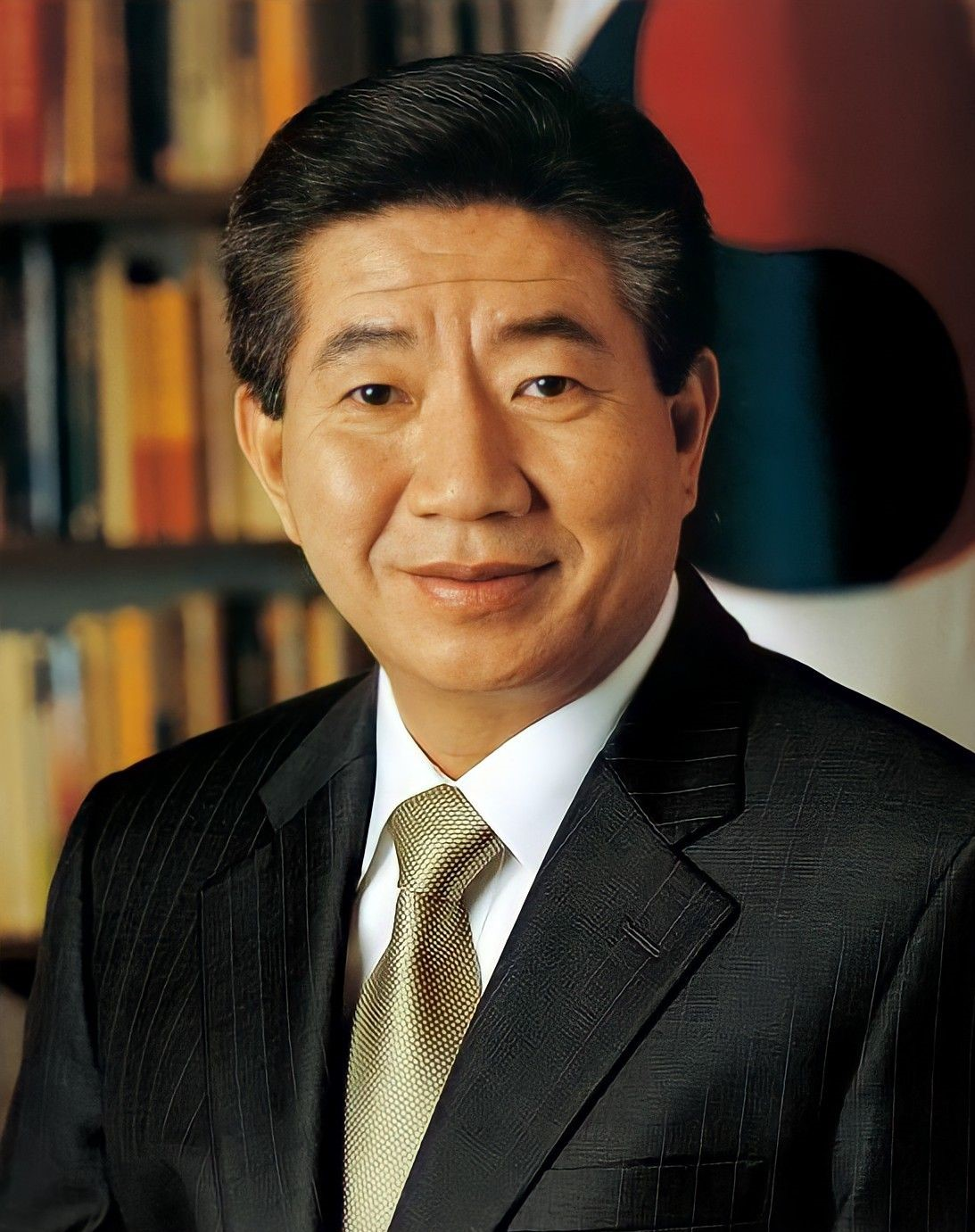
South Korea
Roh Moo-hyun,
President

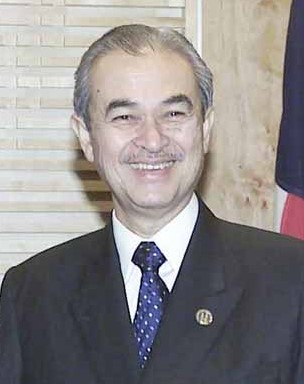
Malaysia
Abdullah Ahmad Badawi,
Prime Minister

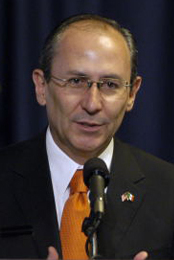
Mexico
Sergio García de Alba,
Secretariat of Economy

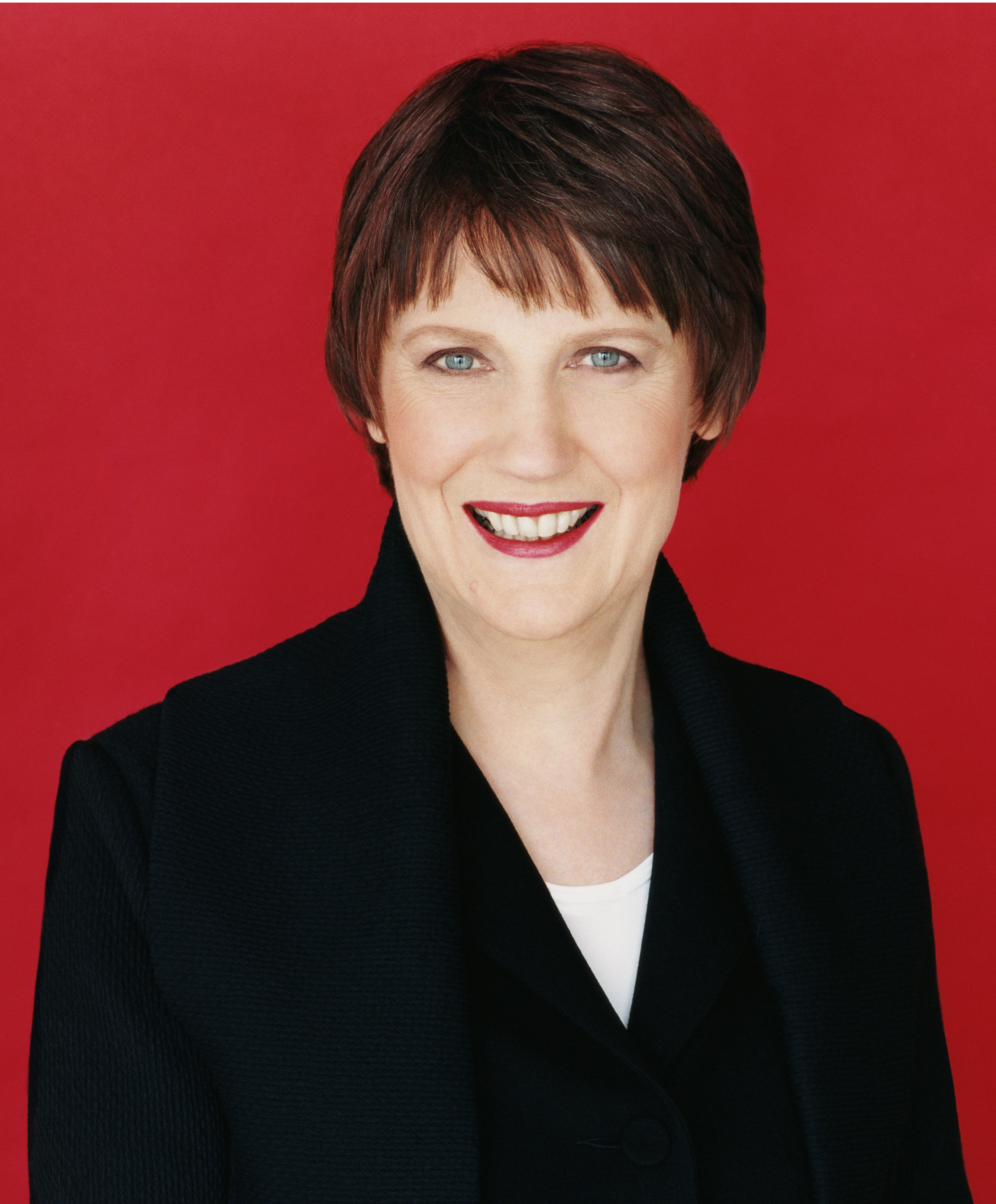
New Zealand
Helen Clark,
Prime Minister

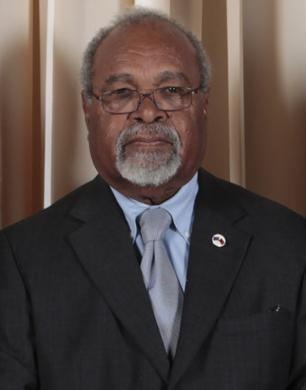
Papua New Guinea
Michael Somare,
Prime Minister

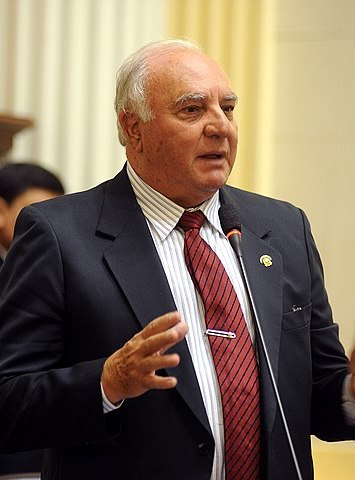
Peru
Luis Giampietri,
First Vice President

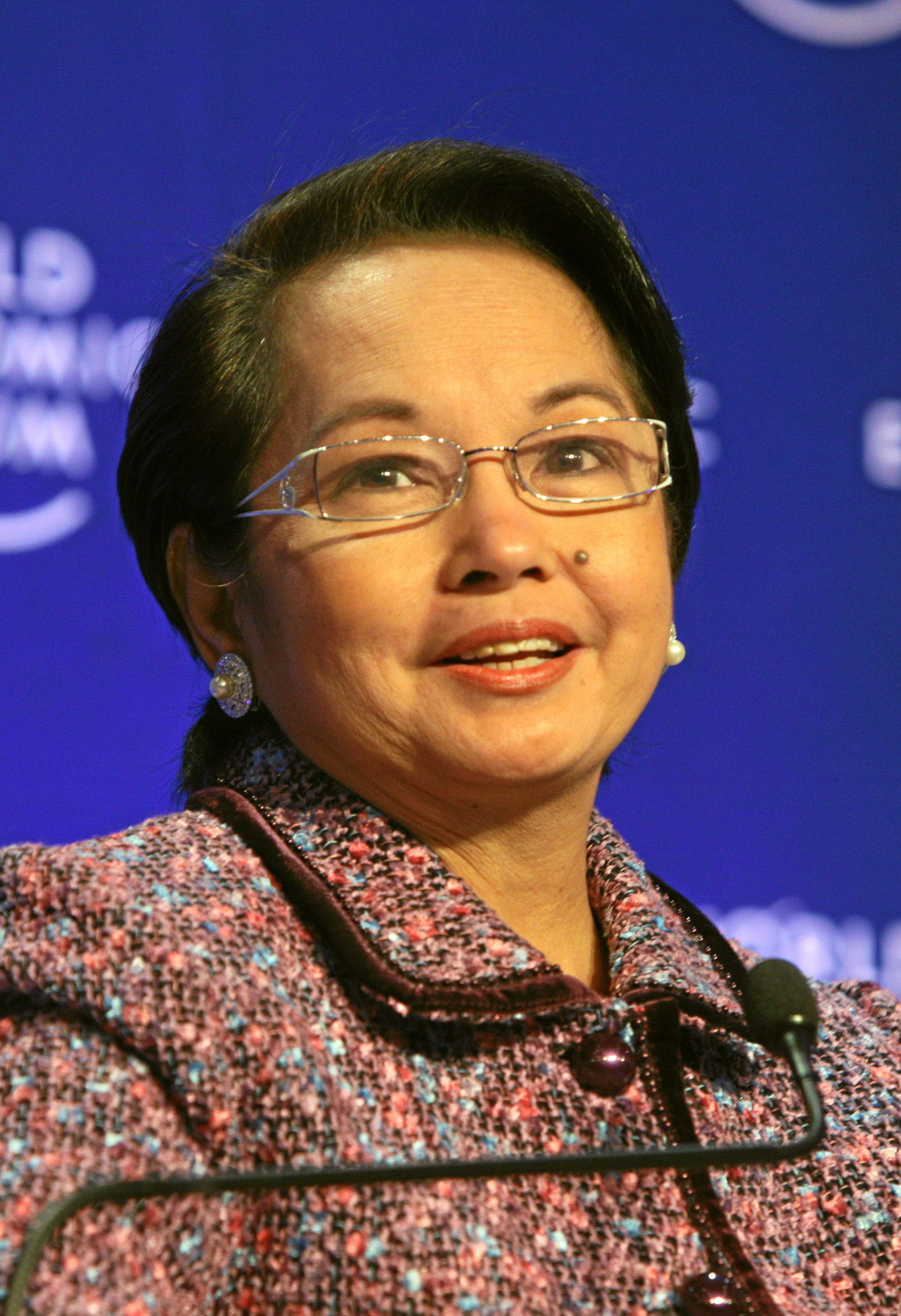
Philippines
Gloria Macapagal-Arroyo,
President

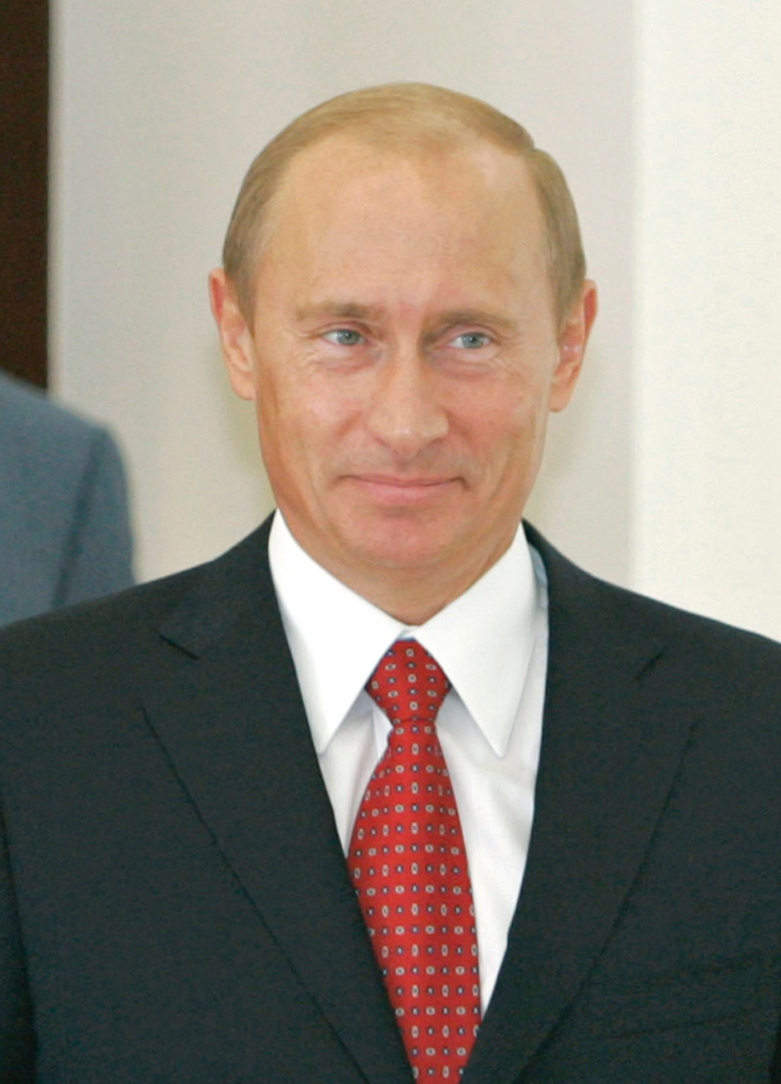
Russia
Vladimir Putin,
President

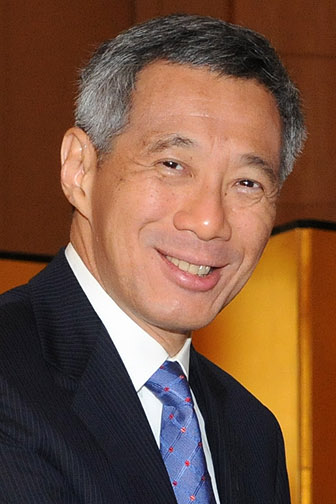
Singapore
Lee Hsien Loong,
Prime Minister

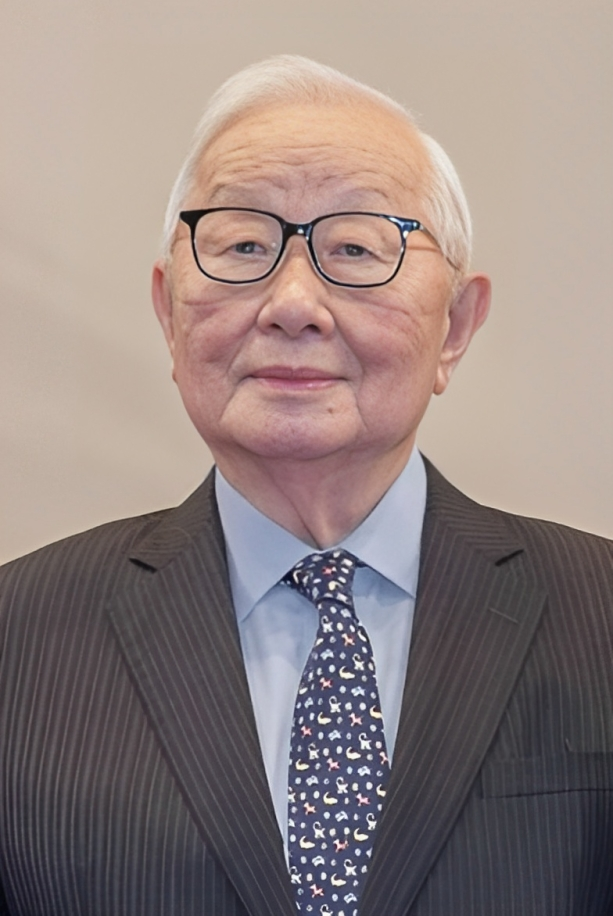
Taiwan
Morris Chang,
Special Representative of Leader (Note: Due to the complexities of the relations between it and the People's Republic of China, the Republic of China (ROC or "Taiwan") was not represented under its official name "Republic of China" or as "Taiwan". Instead, it participates in APEC under the name "Chinese Taipei". The president of the Republic of China does not attend the annual APEC Economic Leaders' Meeting in person. Instead, it was generally represented by a ministerial-level official responsible for economic affairs or someone designated by the president. See List of Chinese Taipei representatives to APEC.)
(representing President Chen Shui-bian)

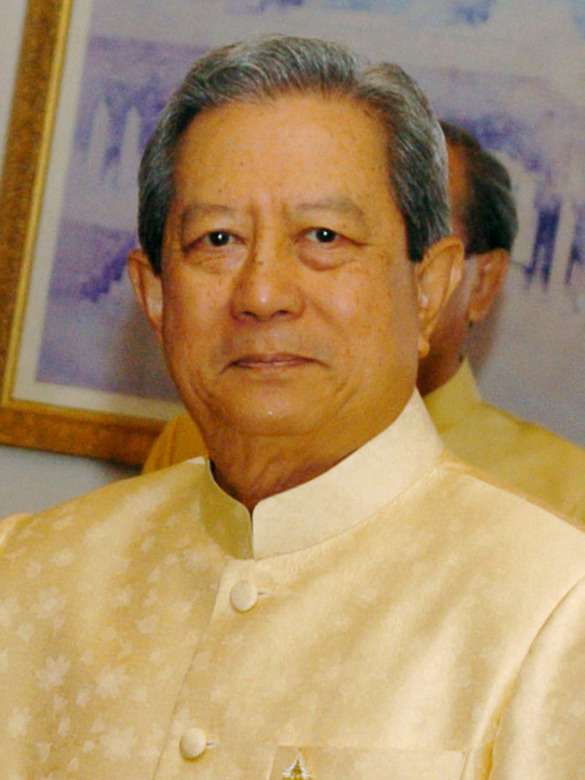
Thailand
Surayud Chulanont,
Prime Minister

United States
George W. Bush,
President

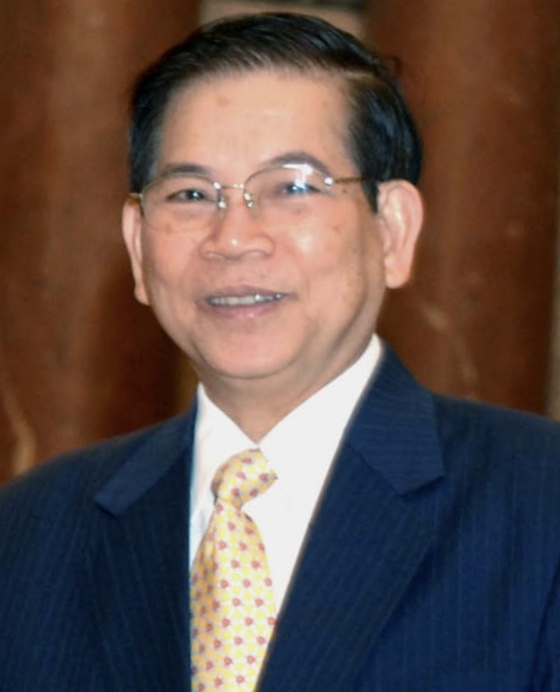
Vietnam
Nguyễn Minh Triết,
Prime Minister (Host)

== Notes ==
Preceded by APEC South Korea 2005	APEC meetings 2006	Succeeded by APEC Australia 2007
