= APEC Australia 2007 =

Economic meeting in Sydney

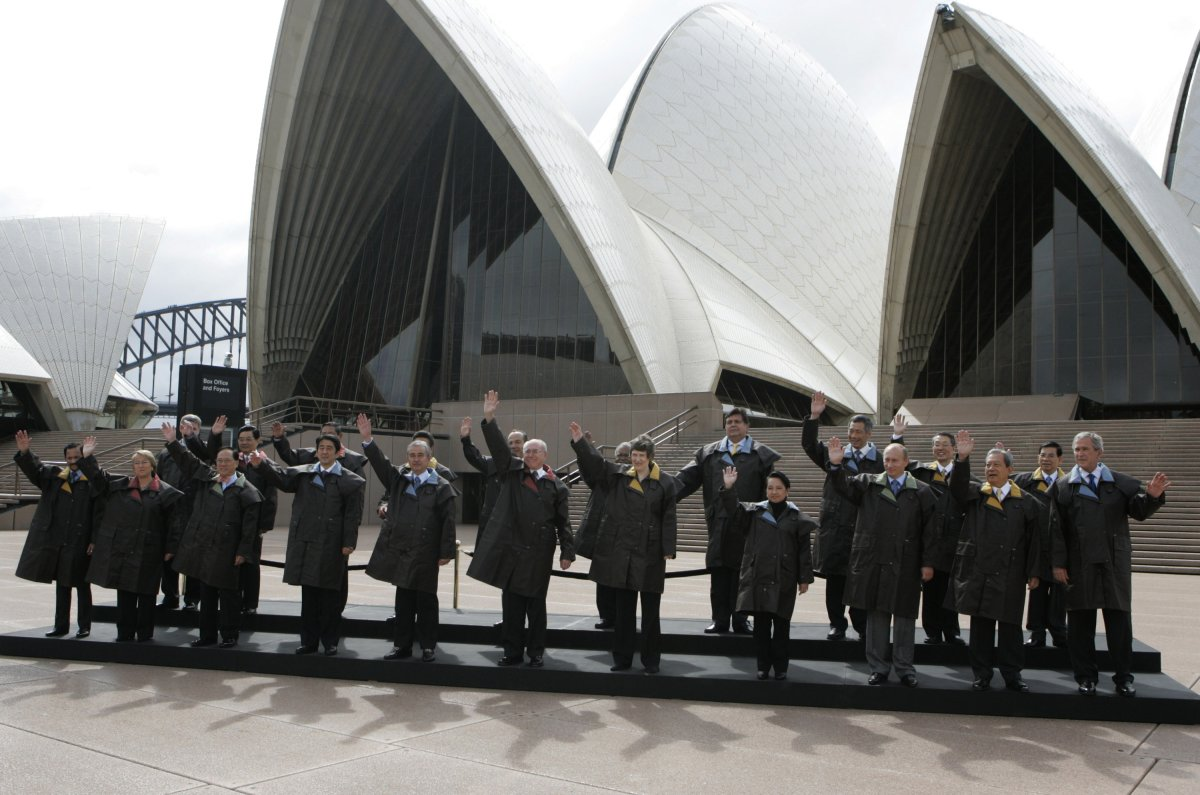
- APEC Australia 2007 Leaders
- Host country: Australia
- Dates: 8–9 September
- Motto: Strengthening our Community, Building a Sustainable Future
- Venues: Sydney
- Follows: APEC Vietnam 2006
- Precedes: APEC Peru 2008
- Website: apec2007.org (archived)

APEC Australia 2007 was a series of political meetings held around Australia between the 21 member economies of the Asia-Pacific Economic Cooperation during 2007. Various meetings were held across Australia from January to August 2007, with the event culminating in Leaders Week, where the heads of government of each member economy attended Sydney from 2 to 9 September 2007.

== Logo ==
The summit's logo was a motif of the seven-point Commonwealth Star or Star of Federation featured on the Australian national flag and Coat of Arms which symbolises the unity of the Commonwealth of Australia. (Six points representing the six Australian states and the seventh point representing the Australian territories.) The logo comprises 21 individual elements, representing the 21 APEC Member Economies from across the Asia-Pacific, uniting to form a diverse but open community. The spectrum of colours of red, orange and yellow reflects the Australian personality of warm and inviting and also the atmosphere of friendship and collaboration fostered by the APEC meetings.

== Planning for APEC Australia 2007 ==
As the role of APEC host economy rotates between member economies, Australia had been the designated host for 2007 for a number of years. In August 2004, the Department of the Prime Minister and Cabinet established the APEC Australia 2007 Taskforce to allocate a host city within Australia and to organise the event. On 9 February 2005, Prime Minister John Howard announced that Sydney, New South Wales would host the ultimate Leaders Week event. It was also announced that various preliminary meetings would be held in all Australian state and territory capital cities.

Overall security planning was overseen by the Protective Security Coordination Centre (PSCC) of the National Security and Criminal Justice Group from the Attorney-General's Department, through the establishment of an APEC 2007 Security Branch (ASB). The PSCC performed a similar role for the 2006 Commonwealth Games held in Melbourne.

At state level, the New South Wales Police Force formed an APEC Police Security Command (APSC) to secure the Leaders Week meetings in Sydney in September. In 2006, the New South Wales government declared 7 September 2007 a public holiday that encompassed the Sydney metropolitan area, so that people would be kept away from the inner city "to assist with the smooth operation of the APEC event".

== Preliminary meetings ==
A significant number of meetings were held all over Australia from January through August 2007, involving both government departments and businesses from the various APEC member economies:

- Canberra, Australian Capital Territory was host to a Senior Officials Meeting in January.
- Perth, Western Australia was host to a meeting of mining ministers in February.
- Hobart, Tasmania was host to a small and medium enterprises ministerial meeting in March.
- The Hunter Valley, New South Wales was host to a Food Safety Cooperation Forum in April.
- Adelaide, South Australia was host to a senior officials meeting in April.
- Gold Coast, Queensland was host to Fisheries and Marine Resources conservation meetings in April.
- Brisbane, Queensland was host to the Agricultural Technical Cooperation Working Group in May.
- Darwin, Northern Territory was host to the Energy Ministers Meeting in May.
- Sydney was host to the Health Ministers Meeting in June.
- Port Douglas, Queensland was host to the Digital Economy Forum for Women and Women Leaders Network Meeting in June.
- Cairns, Queensland was host to separate Senior Officials, Trade and Emergency Management meetings in July.
- Coolum, Queensland was host to the Finance Ministers Meeting in July and August.
- Melbourne was host to the Small and Medium Business Enterprise Summit in late August.

== Participating leaders ==
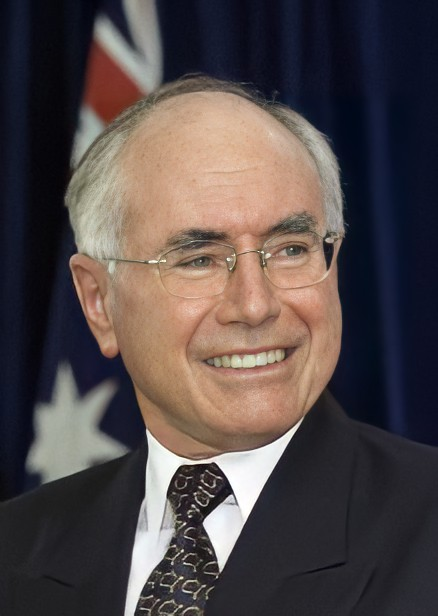
Australia
John Howard,
Prime Minister (Host)

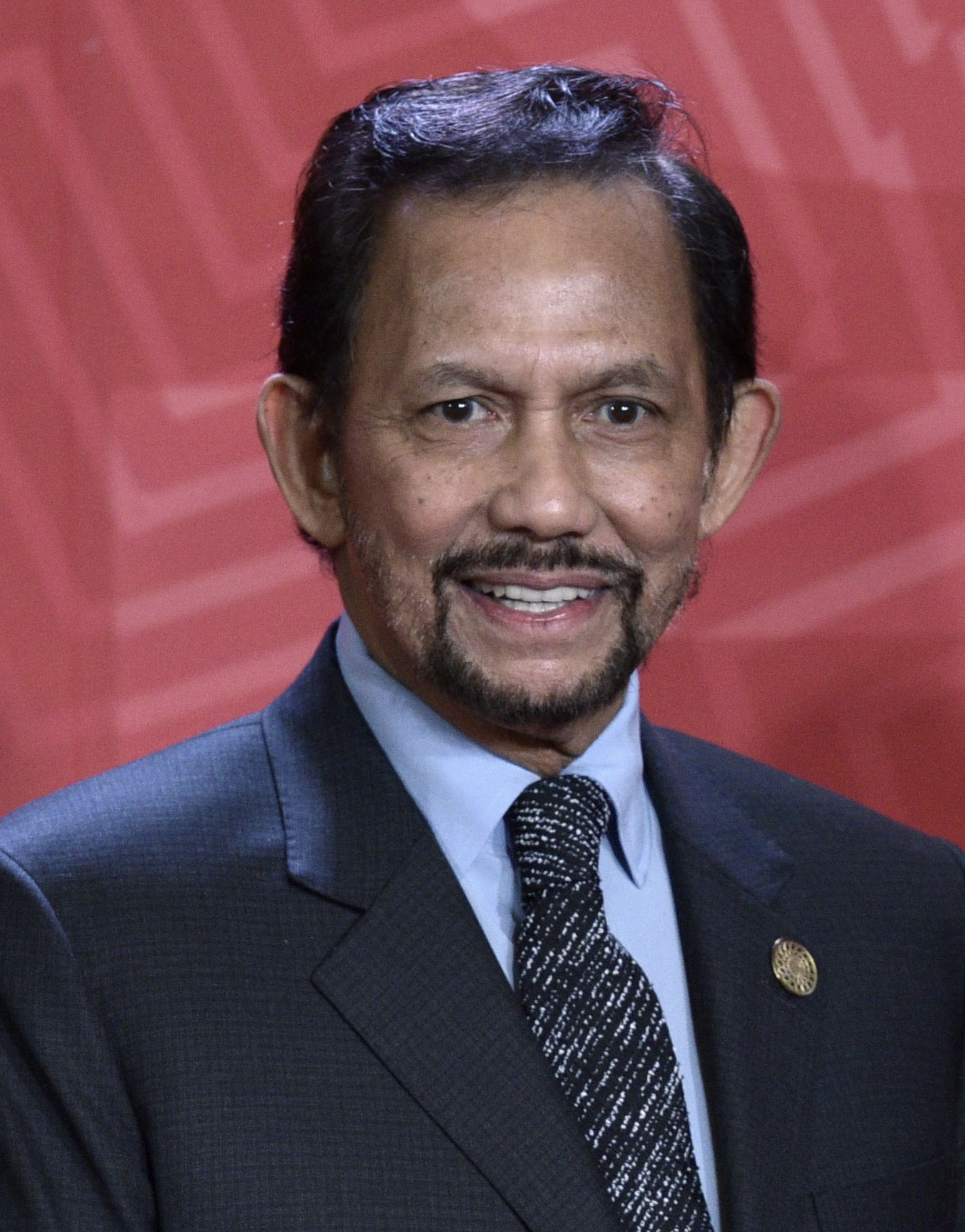
Brunei
Hassanal Bolkiah,
Sultan

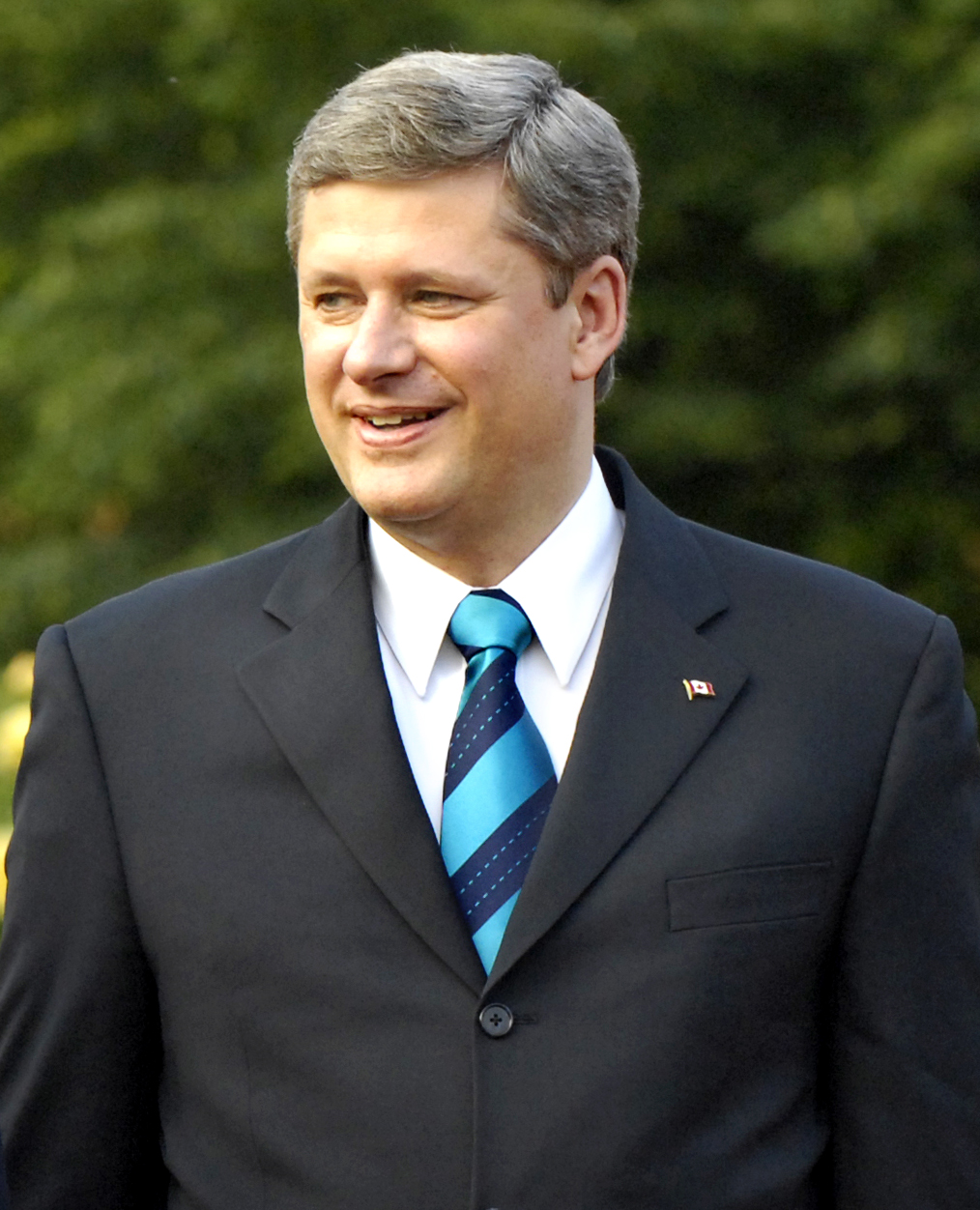
Canada
Stephen Harper,
Prime Minister

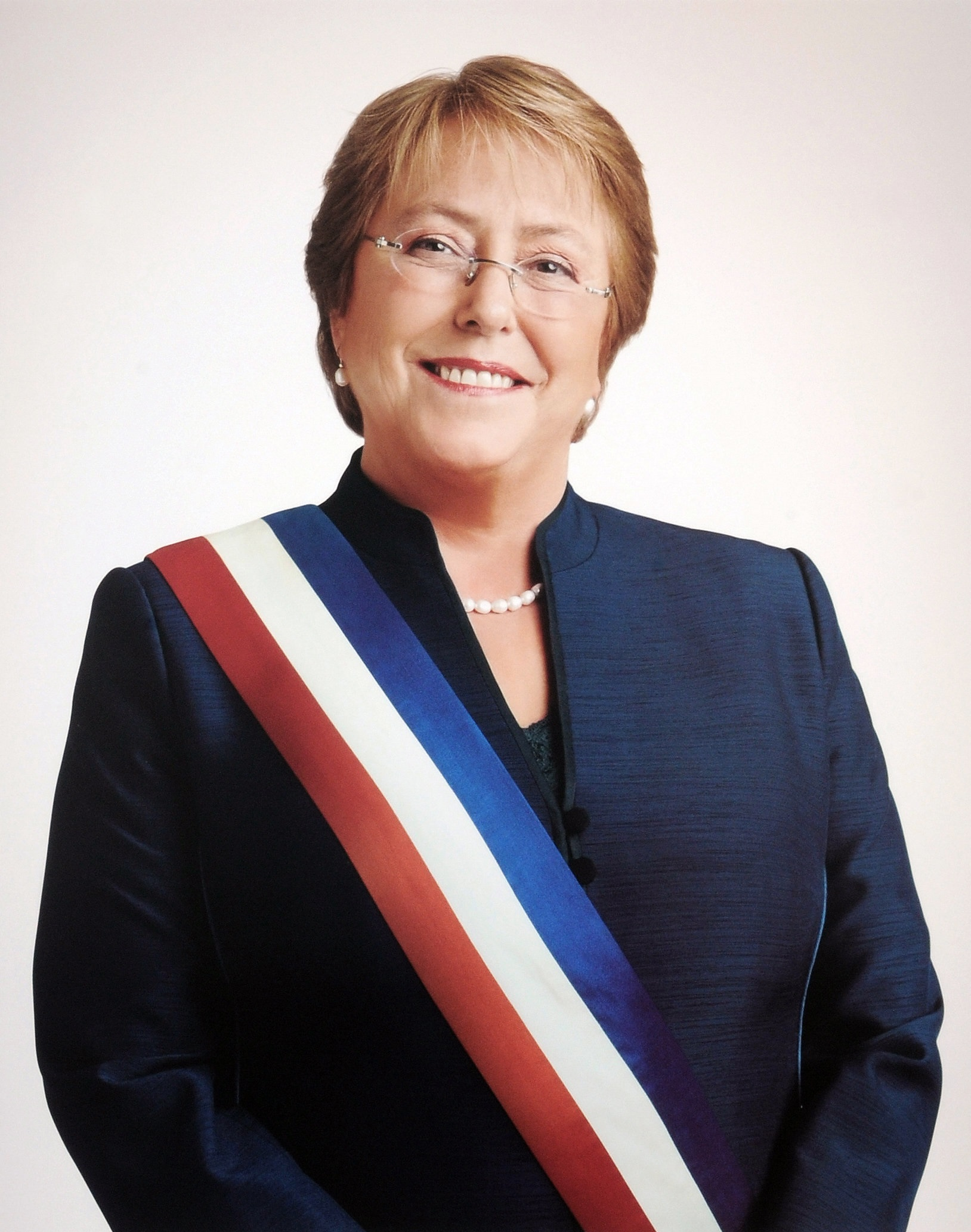
Chile
Michelle Bachelet,
President

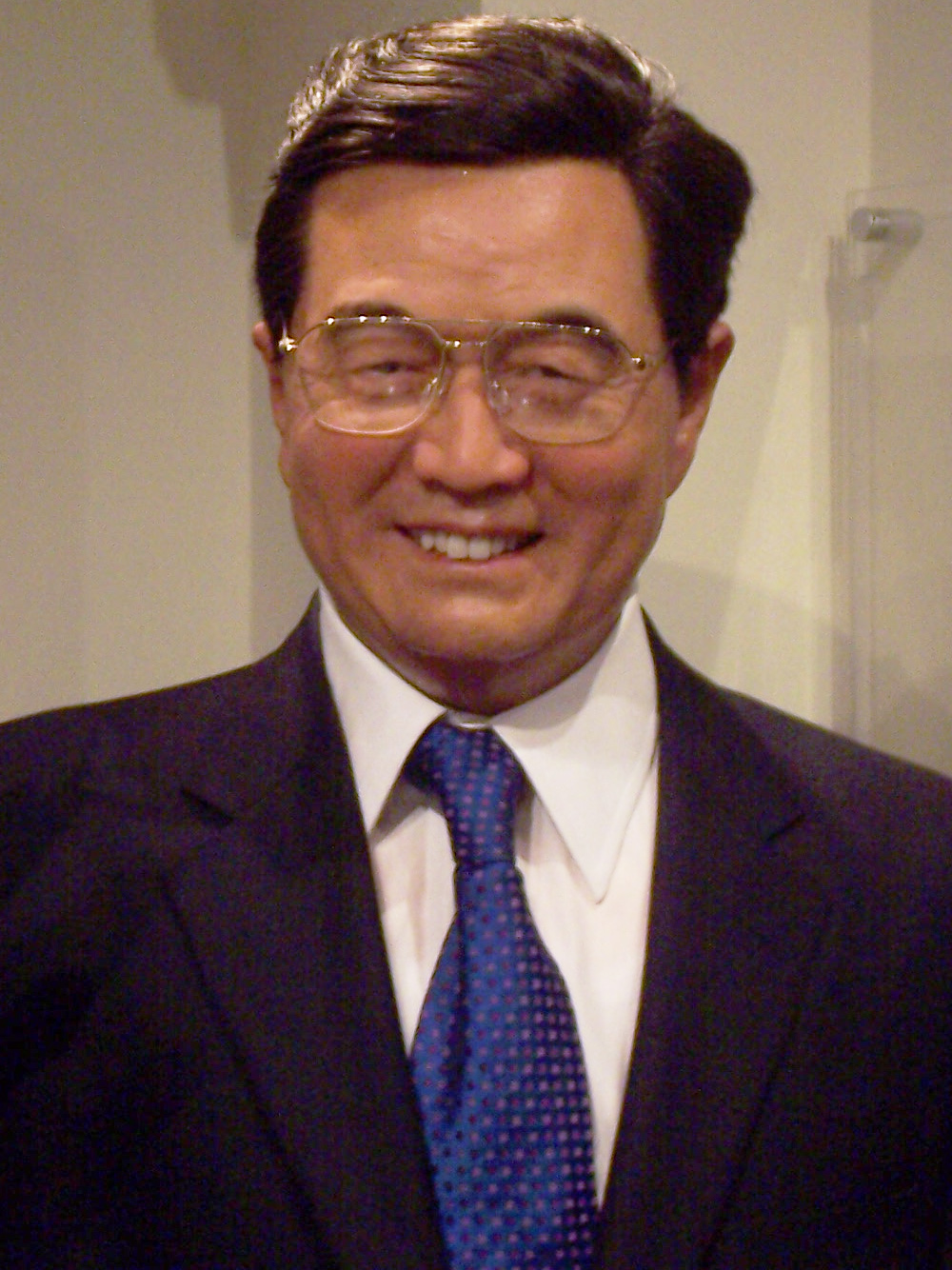
China
Hu Jintao,
CCP General Secretary and President (Note: The president of China is legally a ceremonial office, but the general secretary of the Chinese Communist Party (de facto leader in one-party communist state) has always held this office since 1993 except for the months of transition.)

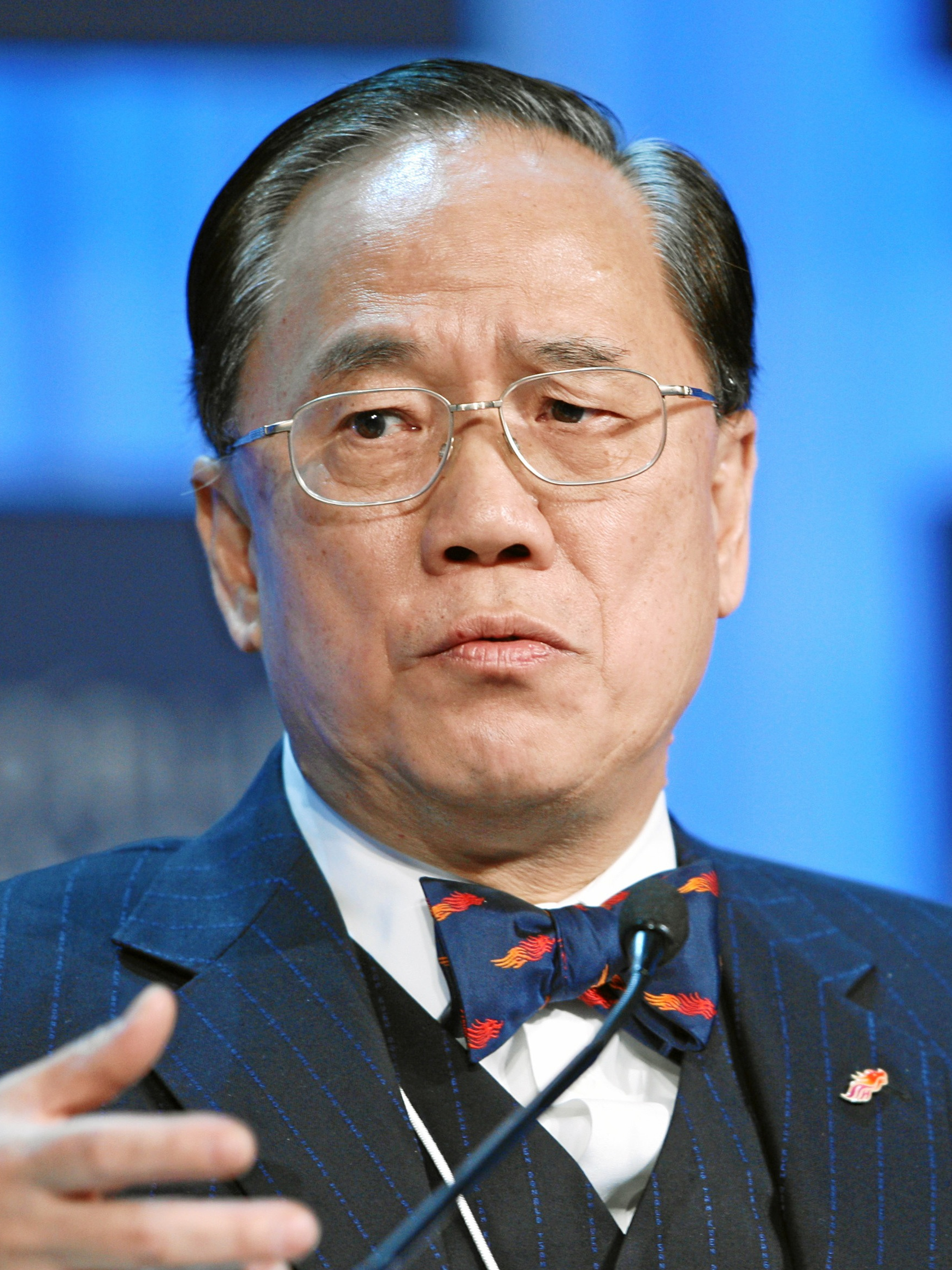
Hong Kong
Donald Tsang,
Chief Executive

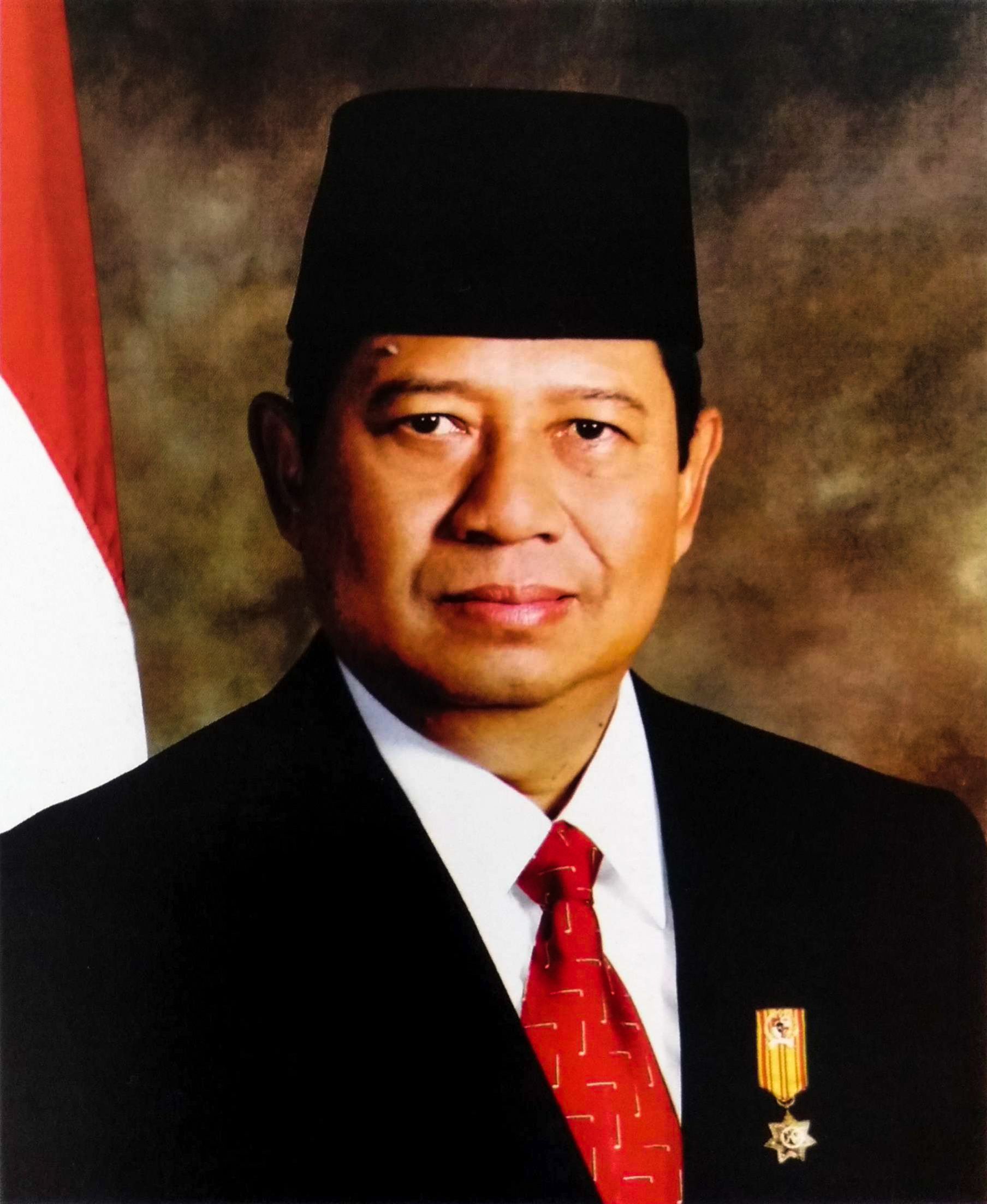
Indonesia
Susilo Bambang Yudhoyono,
President

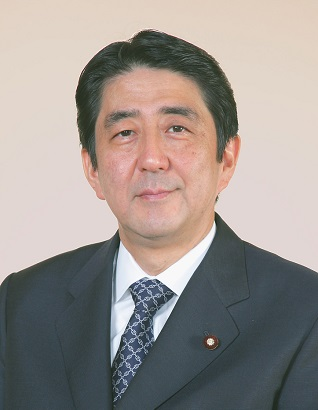
Japan
Shinzo Abe,
Prime Minister

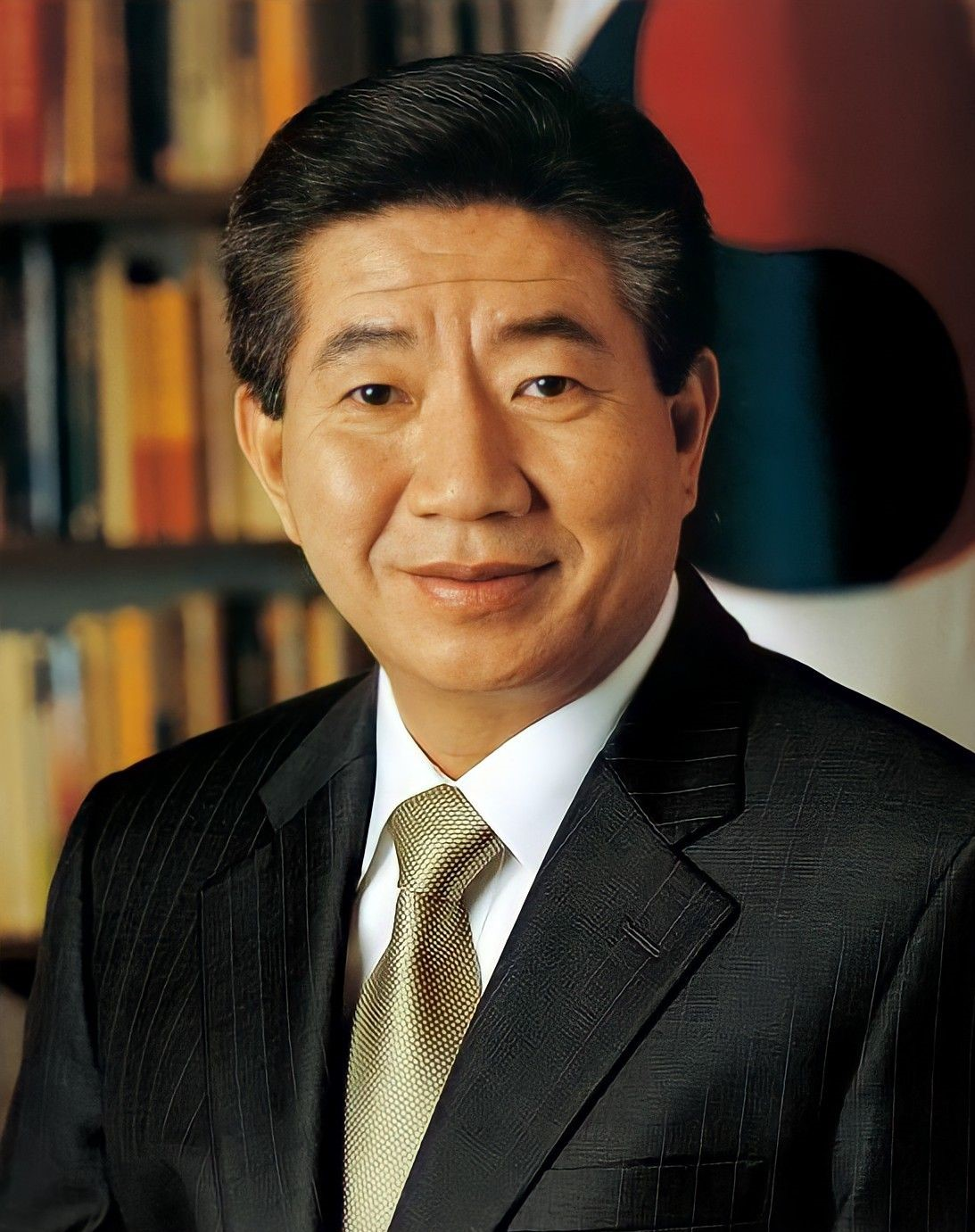
South Korea
Roh Moo-hyun,
President

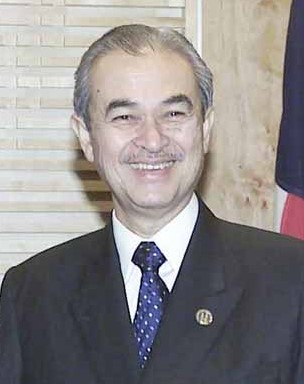
Malaysia
Abdullah Ahmad Badawi,
Prime Minister

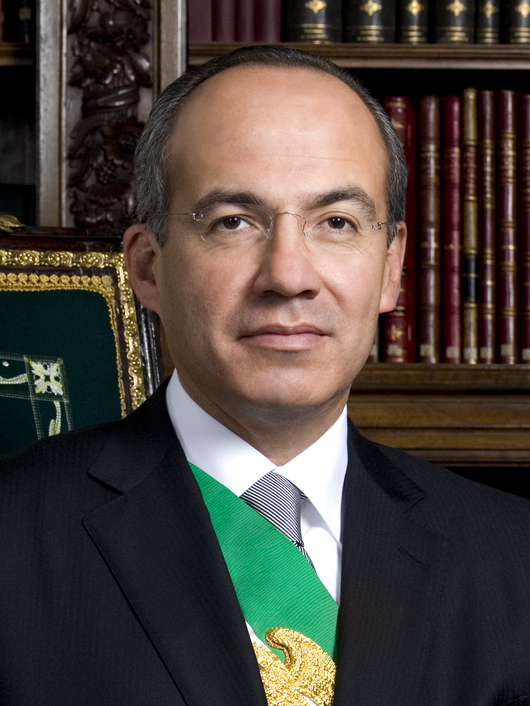
Mexico
Felipe Calderon,
President

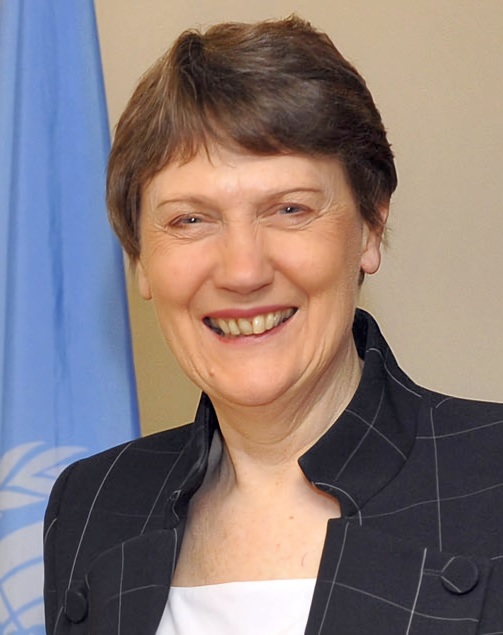
New Zealand
Helen Clark,
Prime Minister

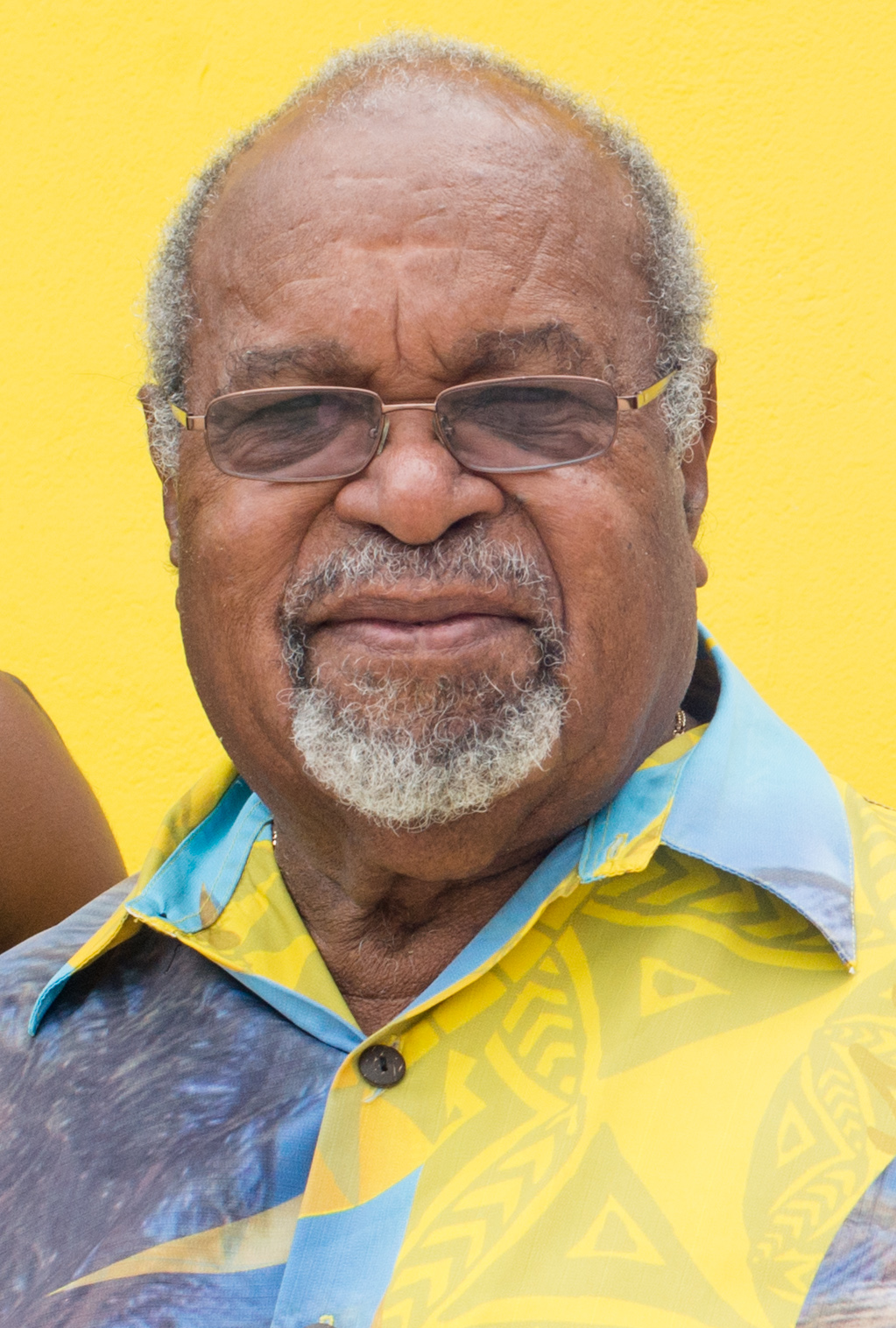
Papua New Guinea
Michael Somare,
Prime Minister

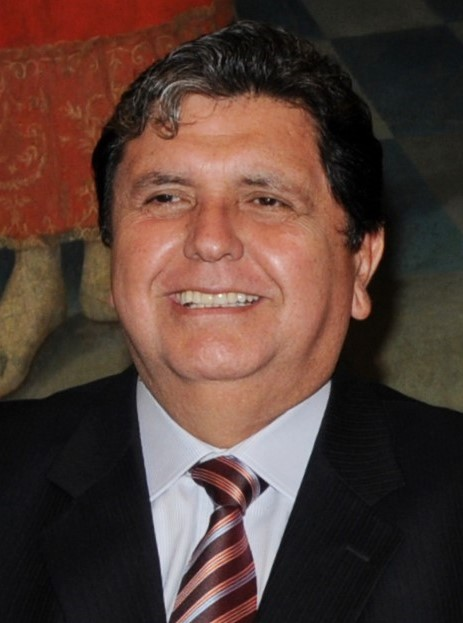
Peru
Alan Garcia,
President

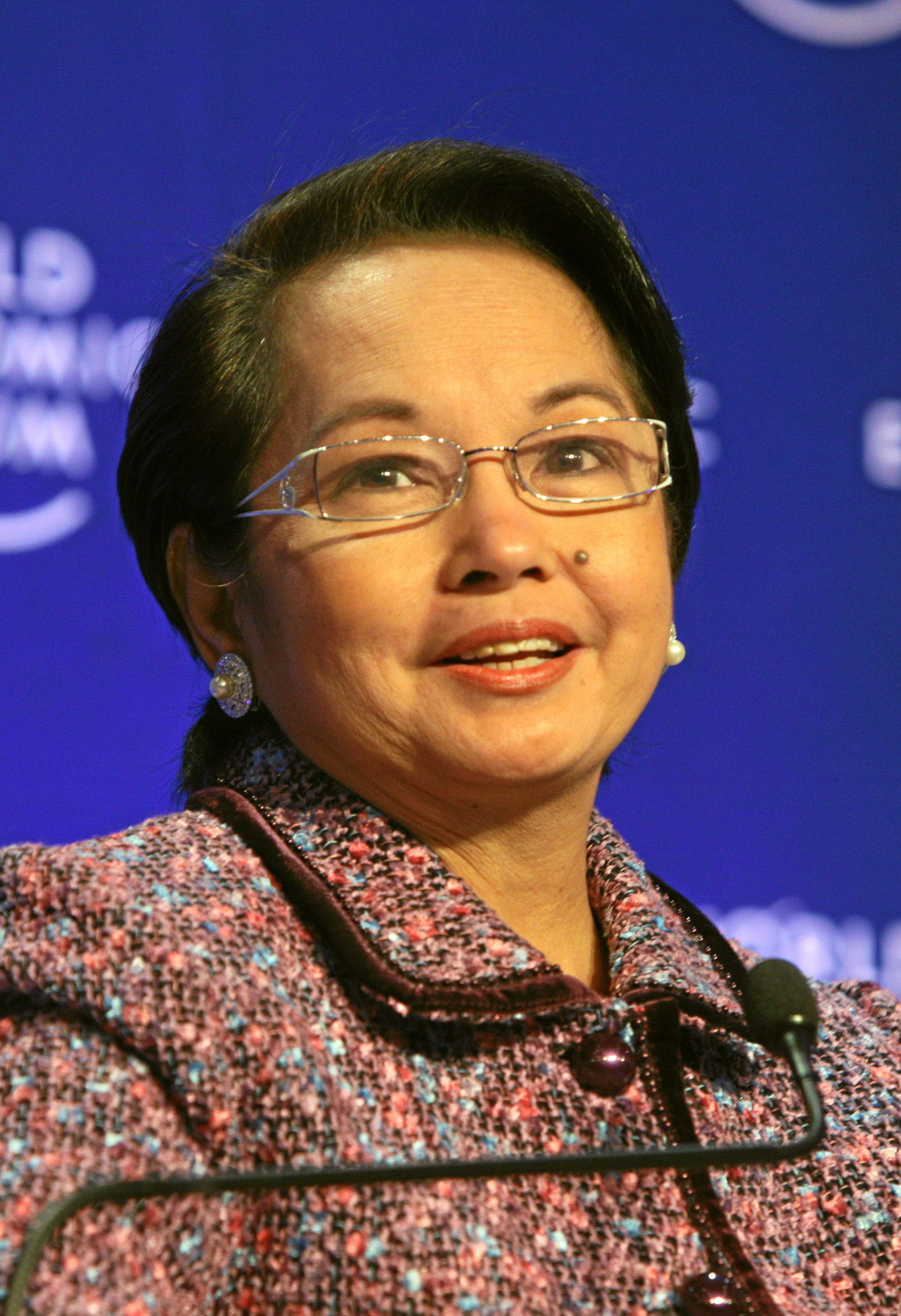
Philippines
Gloria Macapagal-Arroyo,
President

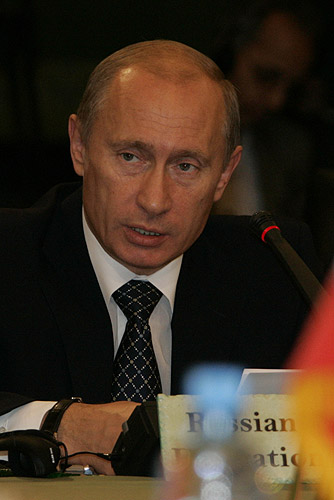
Russia
Vladimir Putin,
President

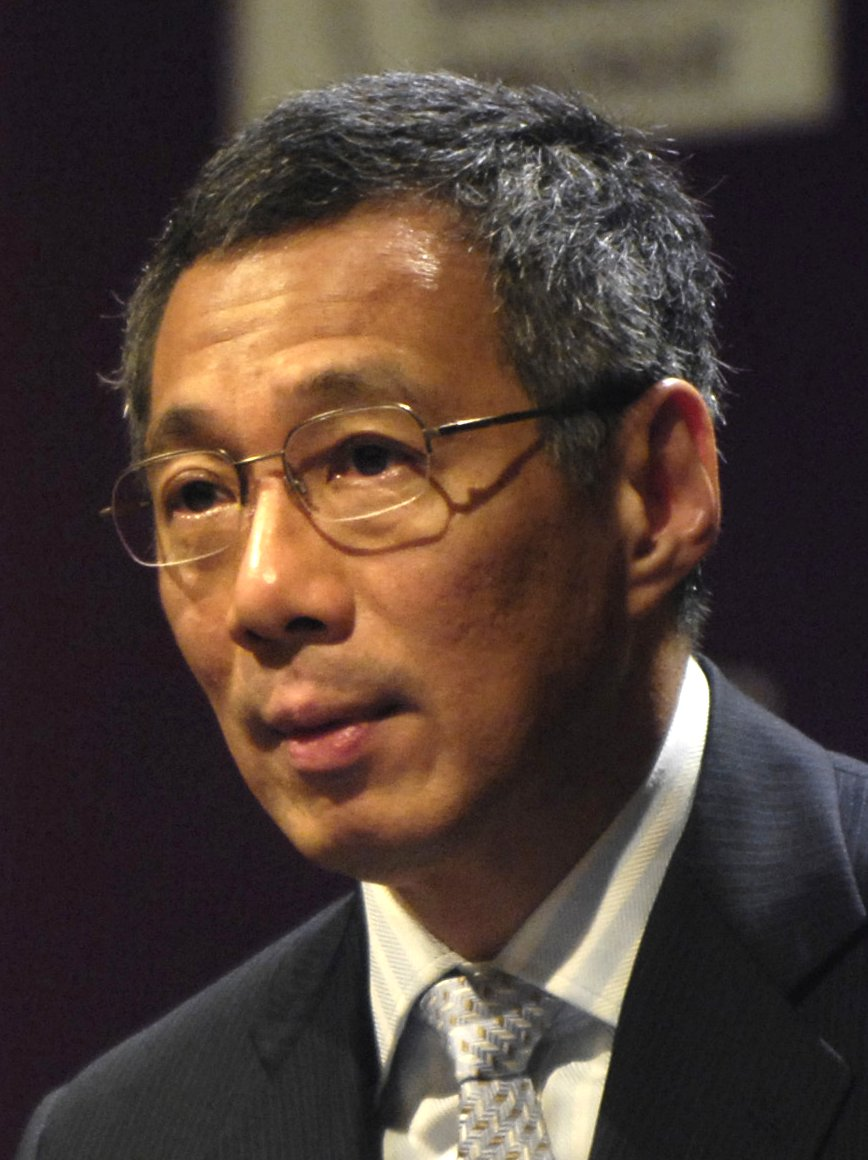
Singapore
Lee Hsien Loong,
Prime Minister

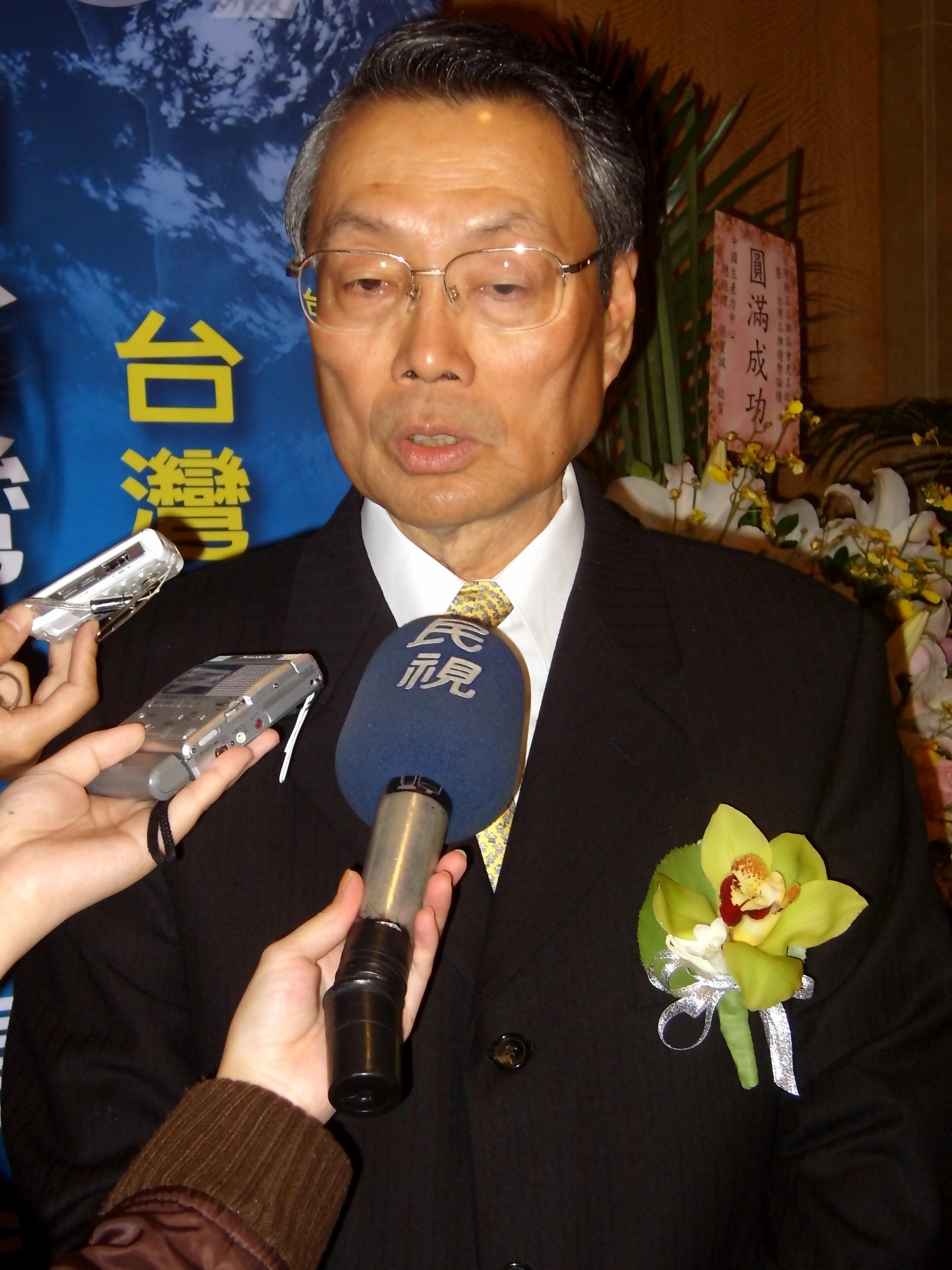
Taiwan
Stan Shih,
Special Representative of Leader (Note: Due to the complexities of the relations between it and the People's Republic of China, the Republic of China (ROC or "Taiwan") was not represented under its official name "Republic of China" or as "Taiwan". Instead, it participates in APEC under the name "Chinese Taipei". The president of the Republic of China does not attend the annual APEC Economic Leaders' Meeting in person. Instead, it was generally represented by a ministerial-level official responsible for economic affairs or someone designated by the president. See List of Chinese Taipei representatives to APEC.)
(representing President Chen Shui-bian)

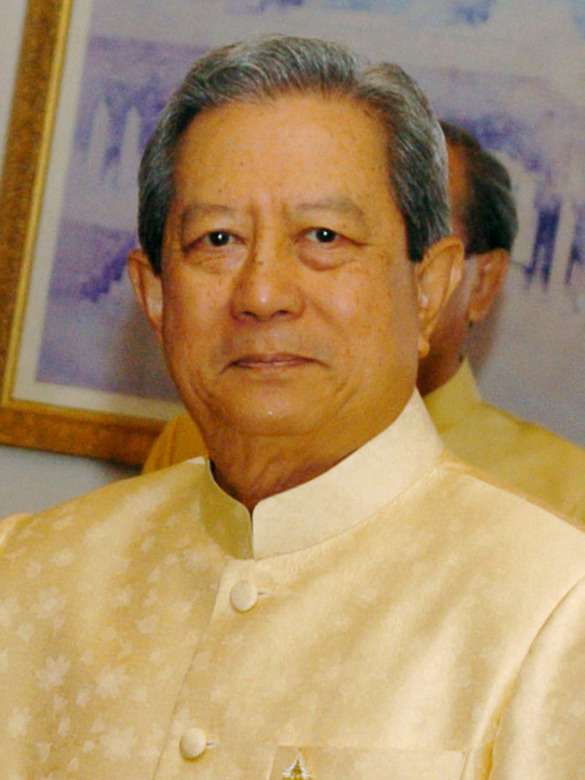
Thailand
Surayud Chulanont,
Prime Minister

United States
George W. Bush,
President

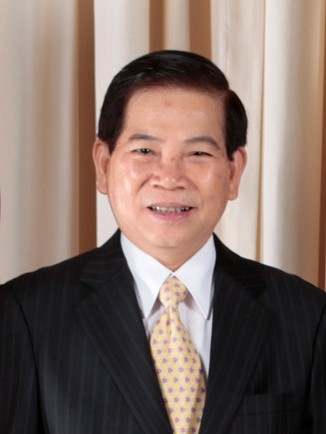
Vietnam
Nguyễn Minh Triết,
Prime Minister

== APEC Leaders Week ==
The venues for Leaders Week meetings included the Sydney Opera House, the Sydney Convention and Exhibition Centre at Darling Harbour and Government House.

A giant illuminated APEC Australia 2007 logo was affixed to the Sydney Harbour Bridge and a fireworks display occurred on Saturday 8 September between the Sydney Harbour Bridge and the Sydney Opera House] Leaders' spouses attended an event at Bondi Beach, and animals from Taronga Zoo were transported to Garden Island naval base to form a private zoo.

International news media reported on an otherwise routine speech at the APEC Business Summit by US President Bush due to several gaffes. He accidentally referred to APEC as "OPEC", but seemed to recover and turned it into a joke; when thanking the Australian Defence Force for its cooperation, he used the phrase "Austrian troops"; and finally he attempted to exit the stage in the wrong direction.

=== Criticism and public response ===
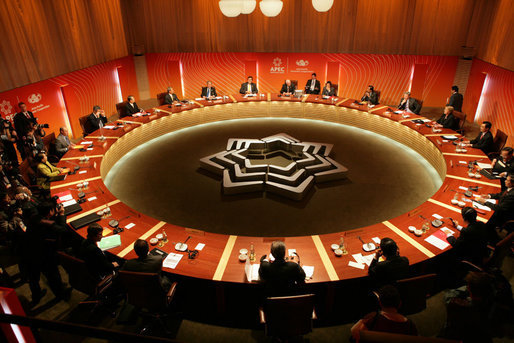
APEC Leaders Retreat, Sydney Opera House

The APEC meeting was widely criticised for having severe security arrangements, which resulted in closure of roads without sufficient warning as leaders' motorcades travelled around the city. Some Sydneysiders also feared similar disruptions to those experienced during the visit by US Vice President Dick Cheney in February 2007 which caused massive transport disruptions, including the closure of the Sydney Harbour Bridge.

Civil liberties and political groups were also concerned about changes to NSW law enacted for the APEC meeting, giving the NSW Police Force new powers, including a suspension of the normal function of habeas corpus, freedom of movement, an excluded persons blacklist and other civil liberties. Police and security forces had also erected a security perimeter around much of inner city Sydney. Another point of criticism is the cost of security for the event with official budget figures at A$169 million. New South Wales Police Minister David Campbell justified the strong security presence and curtailment of civil liberties on the fear of 'violent protest' from the Mutiny collective, and other protest groups.

There was also criticism of an allegedly heavy-handed response to some incidents by the police. In one case, for example, a 52-year-old accountant who crossed a road in front of an official motorcade while on his way to lunch with his son was arrested and detained for 22 hours.

The Philippine government has sought a clarification regarding an APEC press release describing the Filipino national costume for men, the barong Tagalog, as a "peasant shirt".

A year after the APEC meeting, the Sydney Morning Herald gained access through Freedom of Information to the list of people on the excluded persons list. This revealed that 61 people were on the list, more than double the 29 people the police had indicated during APEC. The list included student activists, 12 members of Mutiny and 13 Greenpeace activists.

== APEC in action ==
=== The first test ===
NSW Transport Minister John Watkins warned Sydney that traffic conditions in the city were only going to worsen during APEC, and traffic would be held up due to arriving leaders and their motorcades moving throughout the CBD and Sydney area. Buses were stopped because of security measures on the Sydney Harbour Bridge and Eastern Distributor off ramp, and passengers walked because traffic was not moving during the morning peak on Wednesday. However, so many Sydneysiders took time off or avoided the city that the regular peak hour traffic was greatly reduced.

=== Chaser incident ===
Fake security passes used by the comedians.

On 6 September 2007, eleven cast and crew of the Australian satirical TV comedy series, The Chaser's War on Everything including executive producer Julian Morrow and Chas Licciardello, were detained by police outside the InterContinental Hotel after driving a fake motorcade through the Sydney central business district and breaching an APEC security zone.

The group breached the secure area by masquerading as the motorcade of the Canadian delegation to APEC. Police only realised that the motorcade was a hoax when Chas Licciardello, dressed as Osama bin Laden, stepped out of an official-looking car replete with a Canadian flag flying from the bonnet, outside the hotel, where U.S. President George W. Bush was staying. They were subsequently detained at Surry Hills Police Station for questioning, and charged with "entering a restricted zone without justification" under the APEC Meeting (Police Powers) Act 2007.

Licciardello, Morrow, and nine other members of the production team were released on bail, to appear in court on 4 October 2007. The incident led to criticisms of the event's security, and the security of APEC restricted areas. Their forged accreditation contained the printed phrase "It's pretty obvious this isn't a real pass" above the photograph and "JOKE" next to it. On 28 April 2008 the charges against all eleven members were dropped by the New South Wales Director of Public Prosecutions (DPP) as it was considered that the police gave "tacit" permission for the group to enter the restricted zone by failing to identify the fake security badges.

The following day more members of The Chaser team (except for Morrow and Licciardello who were required by police to stay away from APEC security areas) conducted a further stunt, this time dressing up as a line of black limousines made from cardboard. Police detained and questioned them but, as they were outside the exclusion zone, no arrests were made.

=== 8 September protest ===
Saturday 8 September saw the biggest of the organised APEC protest rallies. Attendance was estimated at 3000 by police, 5000 by the media, and 10,000 by event organisers. While police expected crowds of 20,000, heavy rain dampened attendance. The rally was largely peaceful, consisting mainly of students, and mothers and fathers. One incident of violence was reported, with 17 protesters arrested. Two police officers were injured, one officer struck in the forehead with a dart and the other officer struck with an iron bar. A riot control truck equipped with a water cannon was called in but it was not used.

=== Police name tag removal inquiry ===
An inquiry into the removal of name tags by dozens of police officers at the Saturday 8th protest was launched by the New South Wales Police Professional Standards Command following public complaints. Human Rights Monitors member Dale Mills took over 200 photographs of officers with removed name badges. Photographs taken during the protest showed officers wearing badgeless uniforms. A video taken during the protest has one officer stating that the badges were removed as "It's one of the policies the bosses have this week". Authorities denied that the intent of this policy was to conceal officers' identities. Instead they stated that pin-backed identification tags presented a risk to police officers and that in the future, police assigned to protest duty would be wearing cloth identification tags. Demonstrators have contested this version, stating the police officers at the protest were wearing velcro tags.

On Tuesday 18 September the inquiry cleared all officers of wrongdoing as the name tags 'compromised safety' of the officers.

== Decisions ==
=== Climate change ===
The "Sydney Declaration on Climate Change" was signed on 8 September 2007 by the leaders present at APEC. It indicates the wish of signatories to work towards unspecified non-binding "aspirational" goals on energy efficiency per unit of GDP.

== Notes ==
Preceded by APEC Vietnam 2006	APEC meetings 2007	Succeeded by APEC Peru 2008
