= APEC China 2001 =

APEC annual meeting

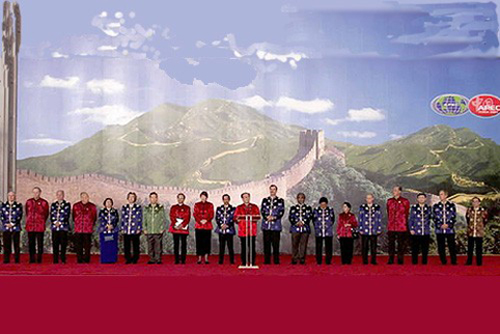
- APEC China 2001 delegates
- Host country: China
- Dates: 20–21 October
- Venues: Shanghai
- Follows: APEC Brunei 2000
- Precedes: APEC Mexico 2002
- Website: apec-china.org.cn (archived)

Chinese name
- Simplified Chinese: 2001中国APEC峰会
- Traditional Chinese: 2001中國APEC峰會
Transcriptions
Standard Mandarin
- Hanyu Pinyin: 2001 Zhōngguó APEC Fēnghuì
- Wade–Giles: 2001 Chung-kuo APEC Fêng-hui

APEC China 2001 was a series of economic and political meetings between the 21 member states of the Asia-Pacific Economic Cooperation forum held in the People's Republic of China during 2001. Various meetings were held across the country, with leaders from all the member countries meeting 20–21 October 2001 in Shanghai.

== Background ==
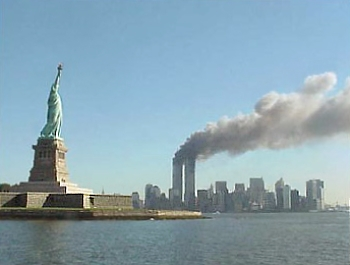
Al-Qaeda's attacks against America on 11 September 2001 initiated international counterterrorism efforts, as well as attempts to mitigate its economic impact.

Many of the member states were still dealing with the fallout of the 1997 Asian financial crisis, whose effects on the price of oil led to the 1998 Russian financial crisis. Discontent with globalization had erupted into major protests in Seattle, Prague, and Genoa. Even China, the only economy to experience rapid growth in the region through the period thanks to various protections against capital flight, saw weaker-than-projected growth and made efforts to improve non-performing loans in its banking system and its dependency on trade with the United States.

The leaders' meeting for APEC China 2001 was held shortly after the September 11th Attacks on New York City and Washington, DC, in the United States, which quickly led to a "war on terror" and an invasion of Afghanistan by American forces. The United Nations Security Council had already passed Resolutions 1368 (condemning the attacks) and 1373 (initiating international counterterrorism arrangements), but not yet authorized an international military response. President George W. Bush had cancelled a scheduled trip to China, Japan, and South Korea to deal with the attack and its fallout, but arranged to meet those countries' leaders while at the APEC meetings in Shanghai. Chinese Foreign Minister Tang Jiaxuan visited Washington to conclude preliminary arrangements with Vice-President Dick Cheney and Secretary of State Colin Powell in mid-September. Bush has visited in China on his first international trip since the 11 September attacks and China offered strong public support for the war on terror.

The meetings also took place during and after the negotiations for a 20-year treaty between Russia and China. The treaty, signed on 16 July, stipulated economic and military cooperation between the two countries and also outlined a policy of general friendliness and cooperation.

== Administration ==
APEC China 2001 was overseen by a steering committee headed by Vice-Premier Qian Qichen and including Shanghai mayor Xu Kuangdi and Party secretary Huang Ju; Organization Department head Zeng Qinghong; State Council secretary-general Wang Zhongyu; Central Office director Wang Gang; Minister of Foreign Affairs Tang Jiaxuan; and Minister of Foreign Trade Shi Guangsheng. Tang, Shi, and Xu also took on a more direct role as members of the conference's Preparatory Commission. Wang Guangya and Zhang Yesui, then vice-minister and assistant minister at the Foreign Office, managed day-to-day affairs as the heads of the conference's secretariat.

== Mission ==
APEC member states (dark green) have remained constant for decades despite others interested in joining (light green), in part because of the trauma of the 1997 Asian financial crisis

The planned overarching theme of the meetings was "Meeting New Challenges in the New Century: Achieving Common Prosperity through Participation and Cooperation", with the subthemes "Sharing the Benefits of Globalization and the New Economy", "Advancing Trade and Investment", and "Promoting Sustained Economic Growth".

Discussion of globalization and the "New Economy" were focused on ecotechnology, e-commerce, human resource development, and corporate governance.

Discussion of trade and investment focused on non-binding principles of trade facilitation, improving regional investment competitiveness, the next WTO round, and the Bogor Goals regarding trade liberalization.

Discussion of sustained growth focused on international financial cooperation, improving macroeconomic forecasting, and structural reform to improve industrial competitiveness.

In practice, the 11 September Attacks in the United States refocused most of the September and October meetings around counterterrorism; the US wars "on Terror" and with Afghanistan; and cooperation to address the negative economic effects of the attacks.

== Preparations ==
The national and municipal governments attached great importance to the APEC summit, in particular to the "grand gathering" of world leaders in Shanghai in October. Ahead of the October events, Shanghai spent a considerable sum on beautifying the city and refurbishing the major 4- and 5-star hotels, including providing them with drinkable tap water. Suzhou Creek—which had been notorious for its foul odor for over 80 years—was thoroughly cleaned. Bridges and other infrastructure were examined and improved where needed, including an expansion of Pudong Airport to accommodate VIP arrivals and departures without inconvenience to other travelers. 320 million rmb was spent improving the city's telecommunications, including internet and satellite upgrades. The Great Firewall was partially opened, with websites for the BBC, CNN, The Washington Post, and some other western media outlets available during the event. Security was heavily tightened, with more than 10,000 personnel brought in to guard the hotels, venues, and associated facilities. Shanghai's airspace and coastline were also heavily monitored throughout the events. Mayor Xu Kuangdi boasted that "Shanghai is now the safest city in the world" while noting that the municipal government was taking pains to assure that the people of Shanghai were not inconvenienced in their daily lives by the international conference. (In the event of a disaster or attack, the 1,000-odd volunteers staffing the event also received tens of thousands of RMB in disability and life insurance from Ping'an, totaling 1.14 billion rmb $137 million) overall.) Beginning in early 2000, various workers around the city were trained in English to assist international visitors. The "green" nature of the summit was also underlined by using recycled paper materials and by removing nonorganic vegetables and wild game from city restaurants.

== Events ==
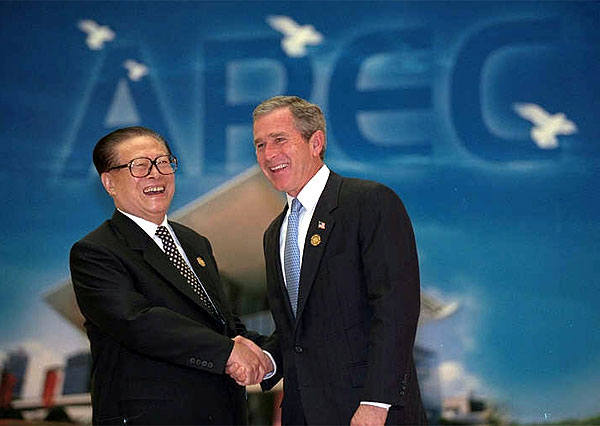
Chinese paramount leader Jiang Zemin with US president George W. Bush on 19 October

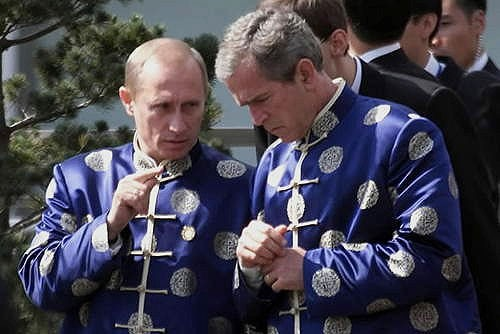
Russian president Vladimir Putin with Bush at the Economic Leaders' Meeting in Shanghai, wearing tang jackets

APEC China 2001 occurred in several stages throughout the year in different major cities around the country.

It began in early February at the national capital Beijing. The APEC Symposium on e-Commerce and Paperless Trading ran from 9–10 February, and the first Senior Officials' Meeting (SOM I) from 11 to 19 February.

In May, there was a "high-level meeting" on Human Capacity Building in Beijing on the 15th & 16th; an ASC Consortium Meeting in the northern port of Tianjin from the 18th to the 20th; and the second Senior Officials' Meeting (SOM II) in the southern manufacturing center and port of Shenzhen from the 26th until 3 June.

Also in June, the Meeting of Ministers Responsible for Trade occurred in the eastern port of Shanghai on the 6th and 7th. The 2nd APEC Investment Mart occurred from the 9th to the 15th in the northern port of Yantai, Shandong.

In July, the Youth Science Festival took place in Shanghai from the 9th to the 14th.

In August, the Manchurian port of Dalian, Liaoning, hosted the third Senior Officials' Meeting (SOM II) from the 16th to the 24th; Beijing hosted the WLN Meeting from the 22nd to 25th; and Shanghai hosted the SMEs Ministers' Meeting from the 26th to the 31st.

In September, the Finance Ministers' Meeting was held in the eastern manufacturing center and historic city of Suzhou, Jiangsu, from the 6th to the 9th and the fourth Technomart—during which 513 contracts were signed, with a total value of $1.07 billion—was held in the same city from the 21st to 25th.

APEC China 2001 ended in Shanghai with its major events: an informal Senior Officials' Meeting 15–16 October, the 13th annual Ministerial Meeting 17–18 October, a CEO summit 18–20 October, a Business Advisory Council Meeting 18–21 October, and the 9th Informal Leaders' Meeting on 20–21 October. The first evening of the Leaders' Meeting was closed with Oriental TV's enormous 20-minute fireworks display along 1.8 kilometers (1.1 mi) of the Huangpu River, including the use of the Bund buildings to represent both piano keys and the APEC member countries.

== Venues ==
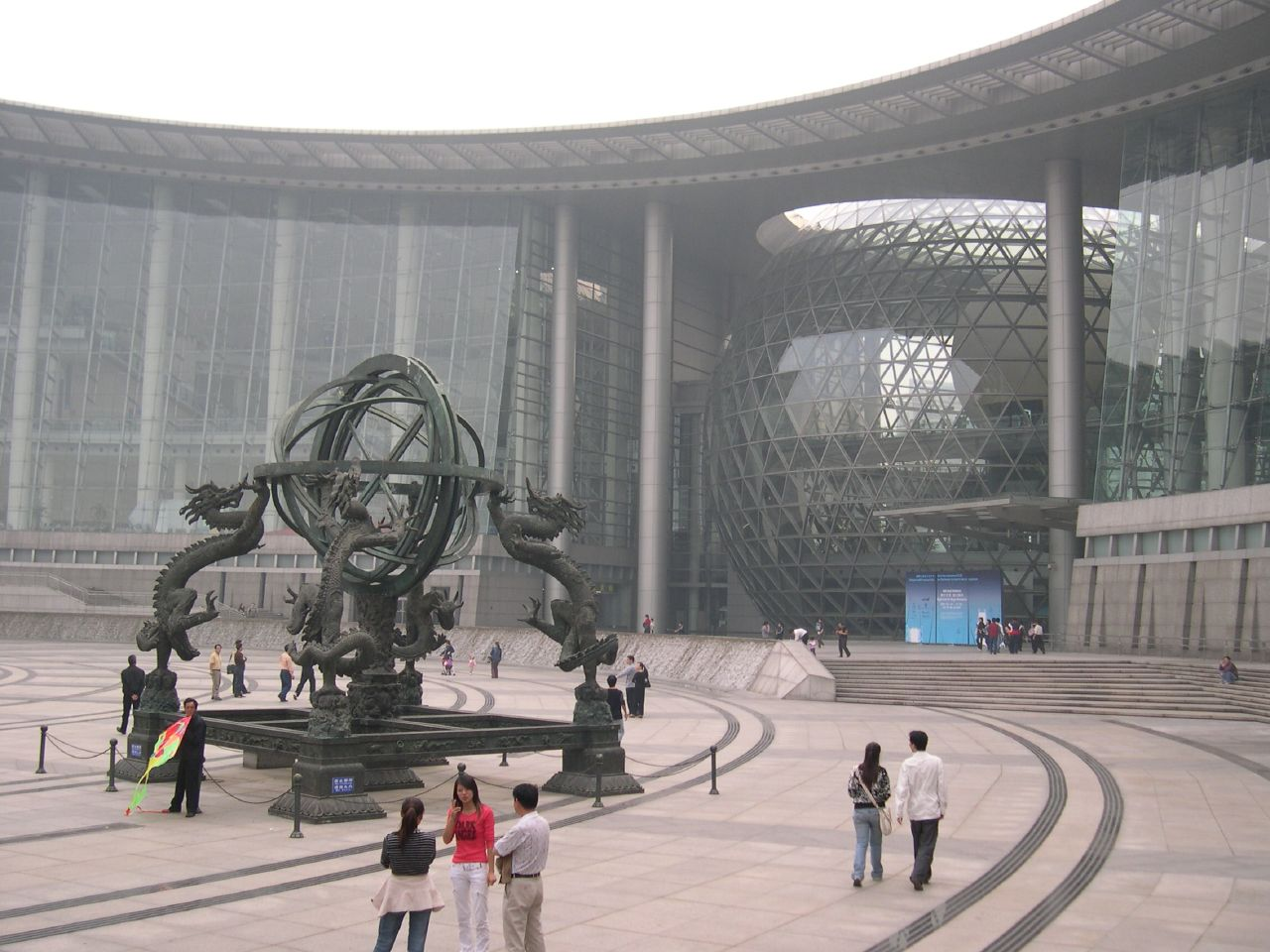
The Shanghai Science & Technology Museum was completed just in time for its meeting halls to be used for the October conferences

For meetings in Shanghai, the main venue was the Shanghai International Convention Center. An "International Media Center" was established at the adjacent Oriental Pearl TV Tower for the 3,179 domestic and foreign reporters from the 517 media organizations covering the October events; it was opened from 14 Oct. through the end of the month. The CEO summit was conducted in the conference halls at the Pudong Shangri-La. For the world leaders' summit, the first day of meetings and the main banquet were held in the International Convention Center and the second day's work took place in the as-yet-unopened Shanghai Science and Technology Museum. Jiang stayed at the Xijiao State Guest Hotel in Hongqiao, where he met and gave some press conferences with foreign leaders.

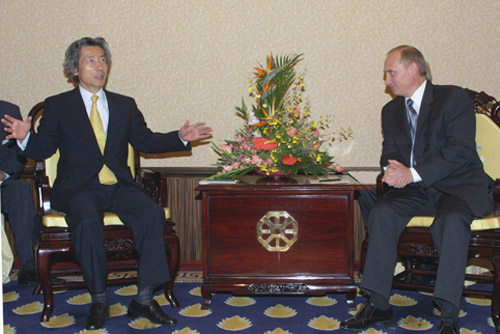
Japanese prime minister Junichiro Koizumi with Putin at the Economic Leaders' Meeting

Leaders and staff were shuttled around town in the event's official vehicles, nearly 800 Buick sedans made by Shanghai General Motors, as well as in over 1300 other support vehicles reserved for the occasion.

== Participants ==
The Economic Leaders' Meeting was attended by:

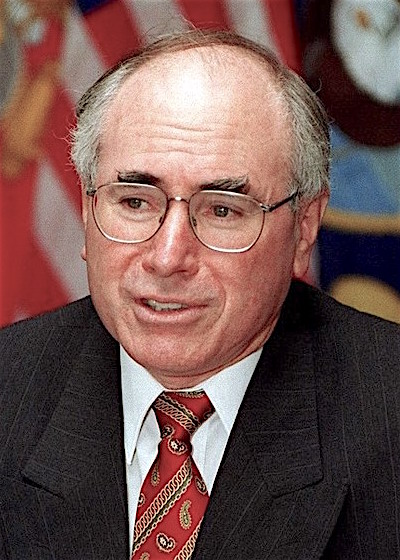
Australia
John Howard,
Prime Minister

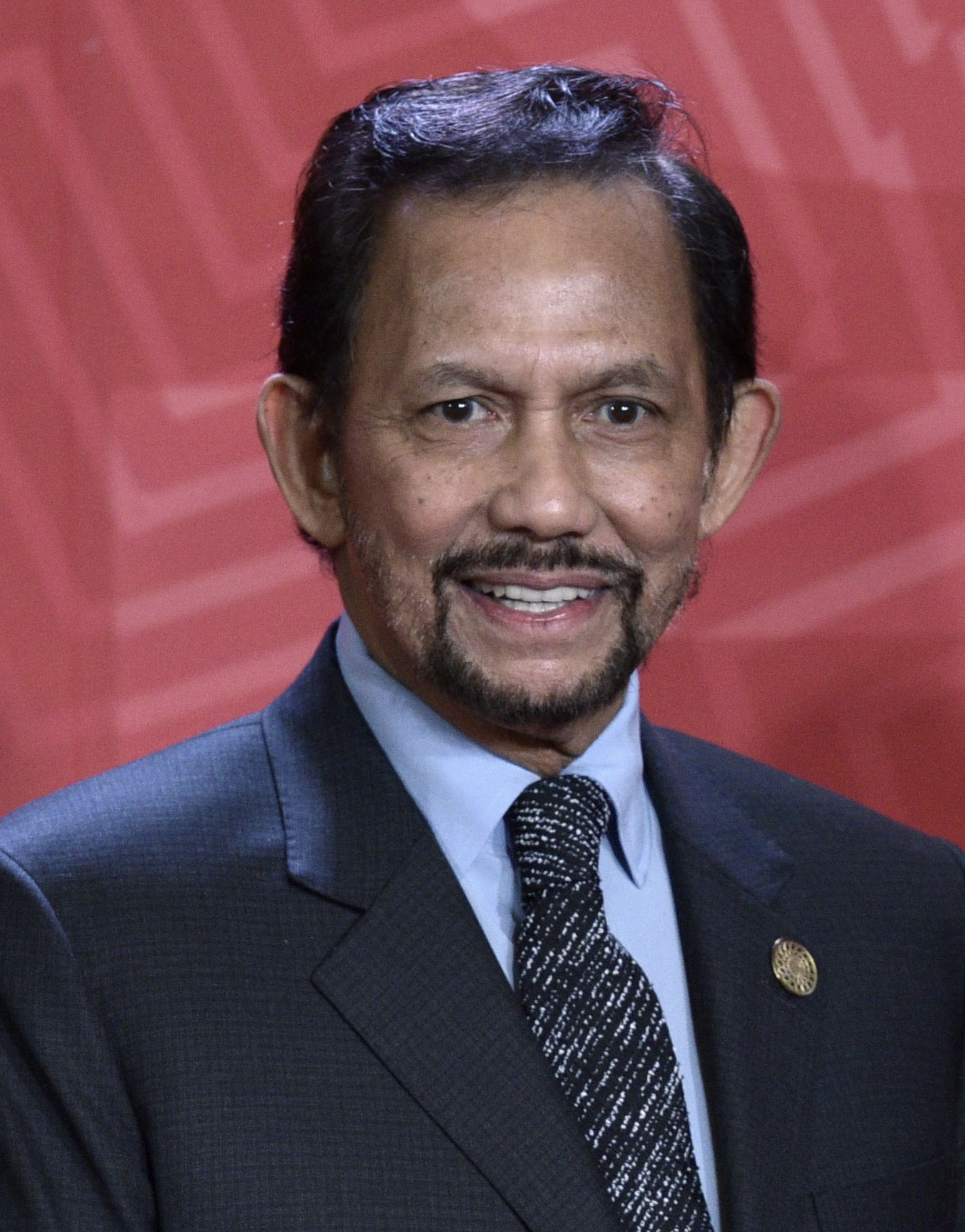
Brunei
Hassanal Bolkiah,
Sultan

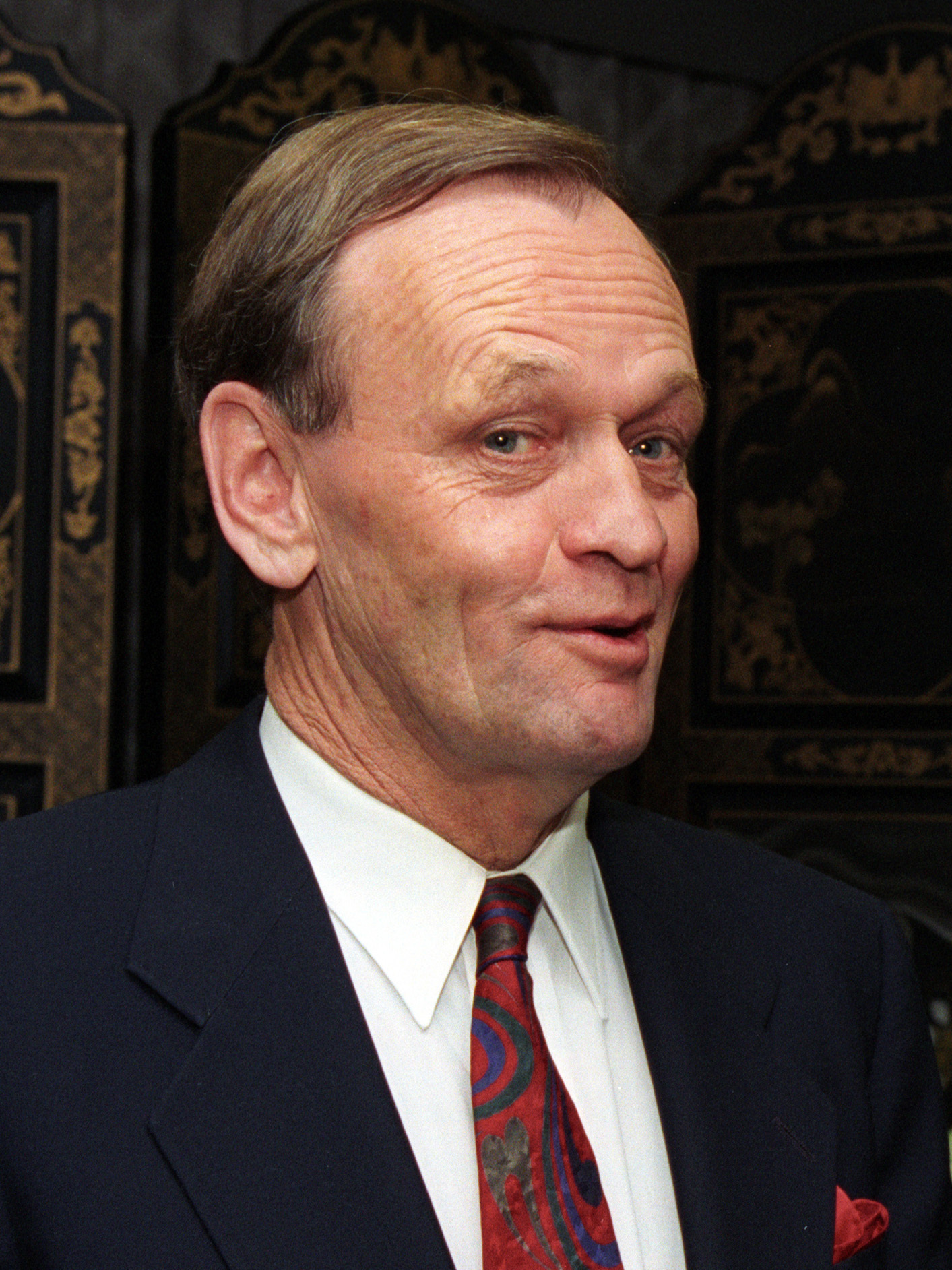
Canada
Jean Chrétien,
Prime Minister

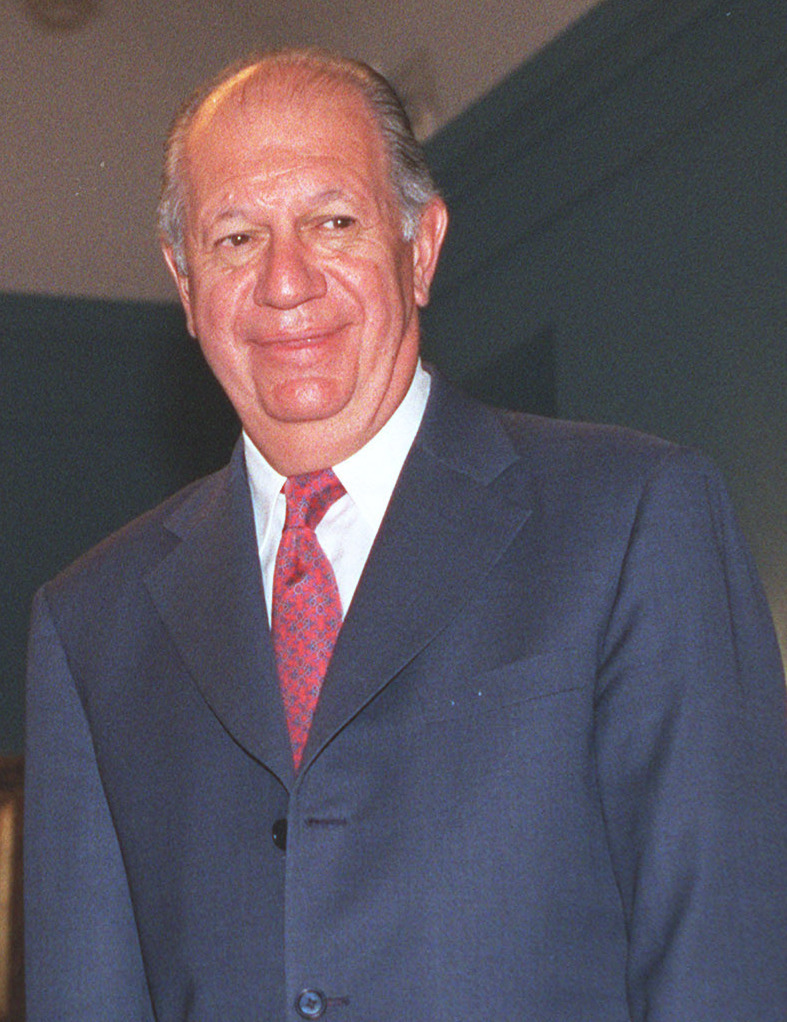
Chile
Ricardo Lagos Escobar,
President

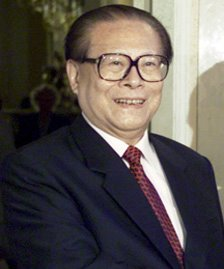
China
Jiang Zemin,
Paramount leader (Host)

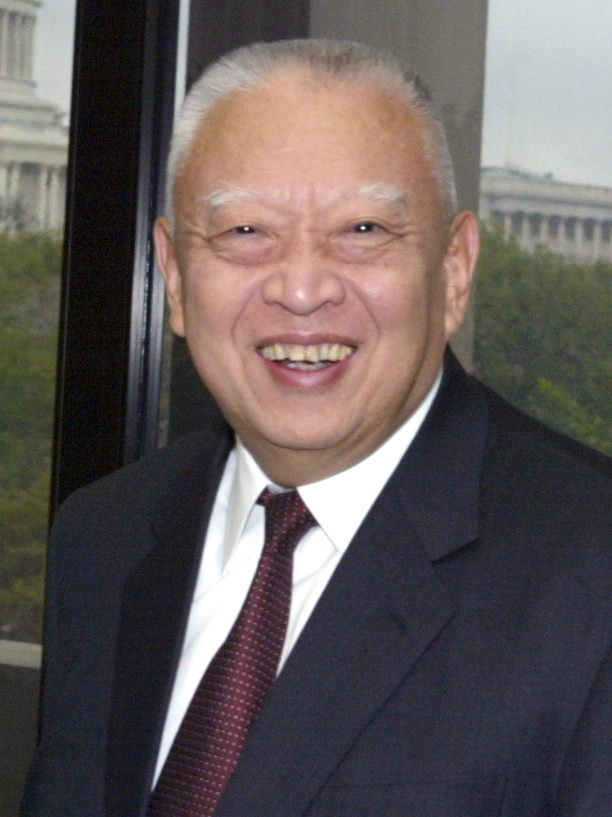
Hong Kong
Tung Chee Hwa,
Chief Executive

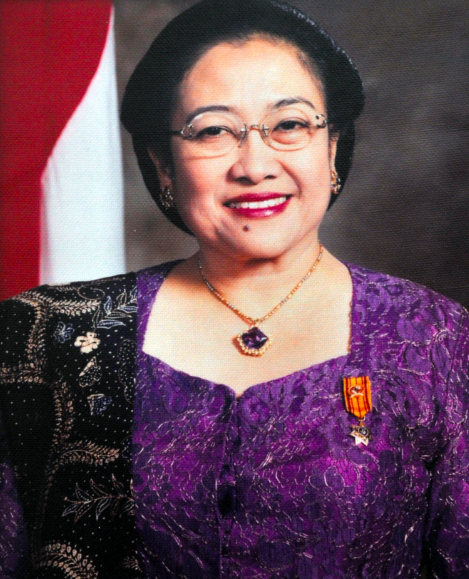
Indonesia
Megawati Sukarnoputri,
President

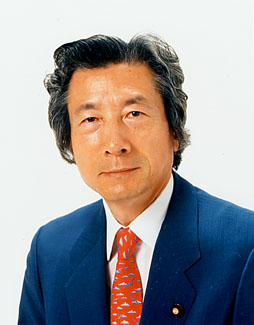
Japan
Junichiro Koizumi,
Prime Minister

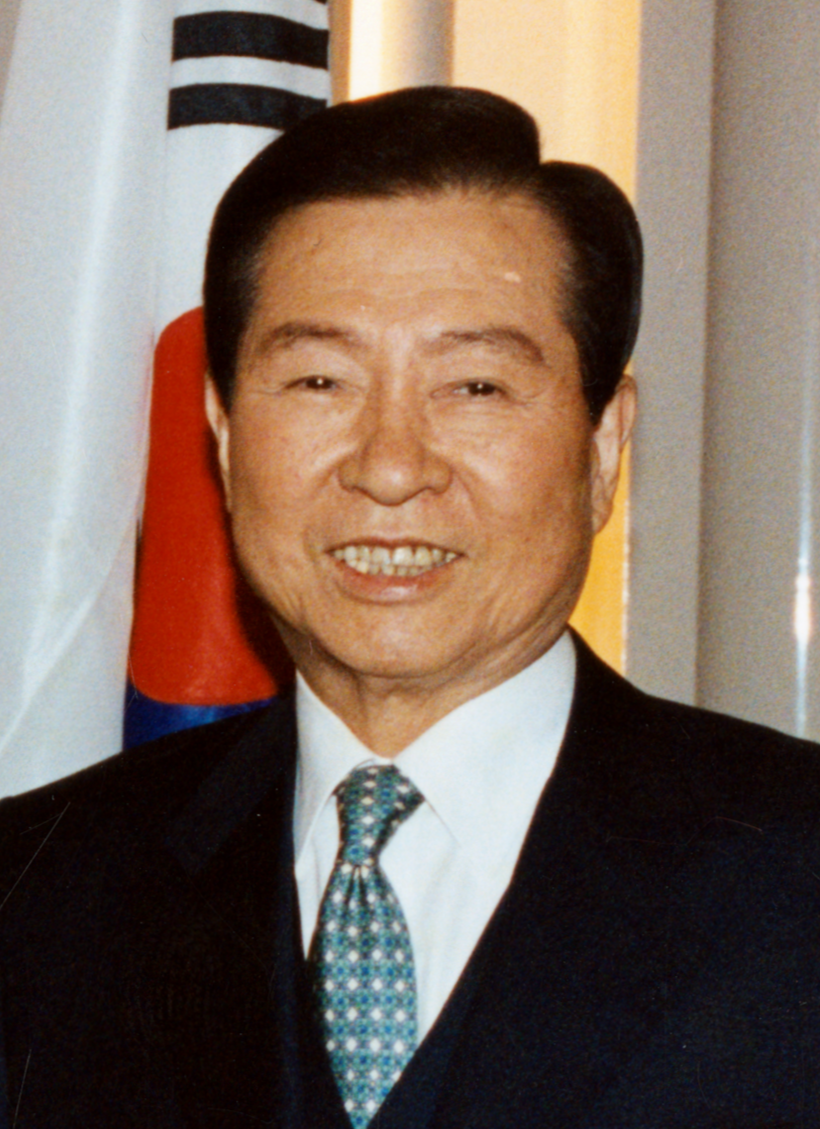
South Korea
Kim Dae-jung,
President

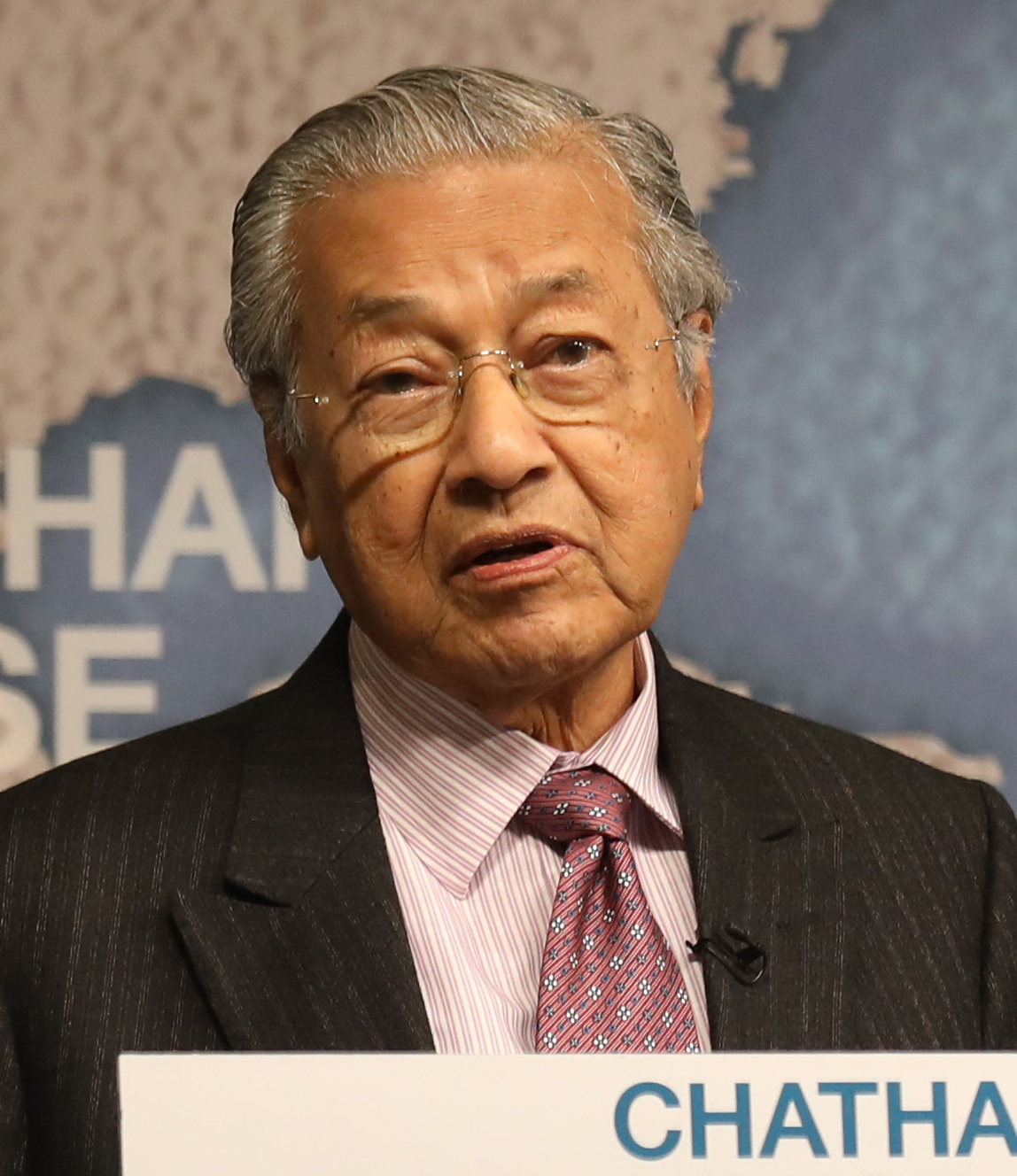
Malaysia
Mahathir Mohamad,
Prime Minister

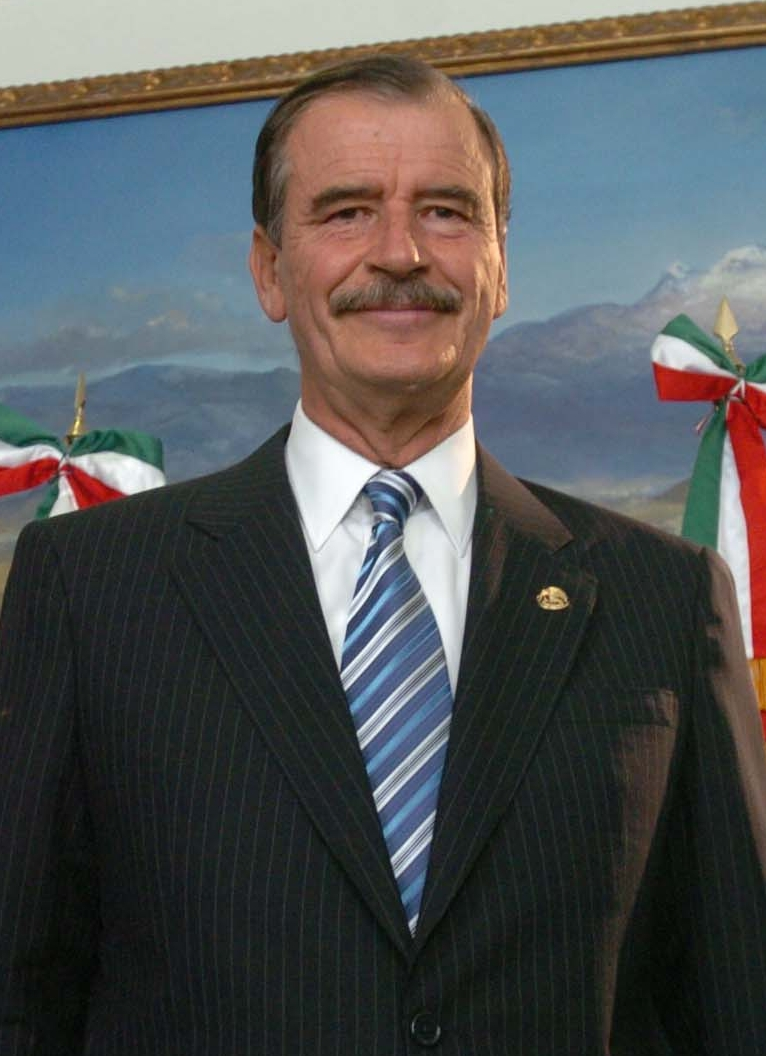
Mexico
Vicente Fox,
President

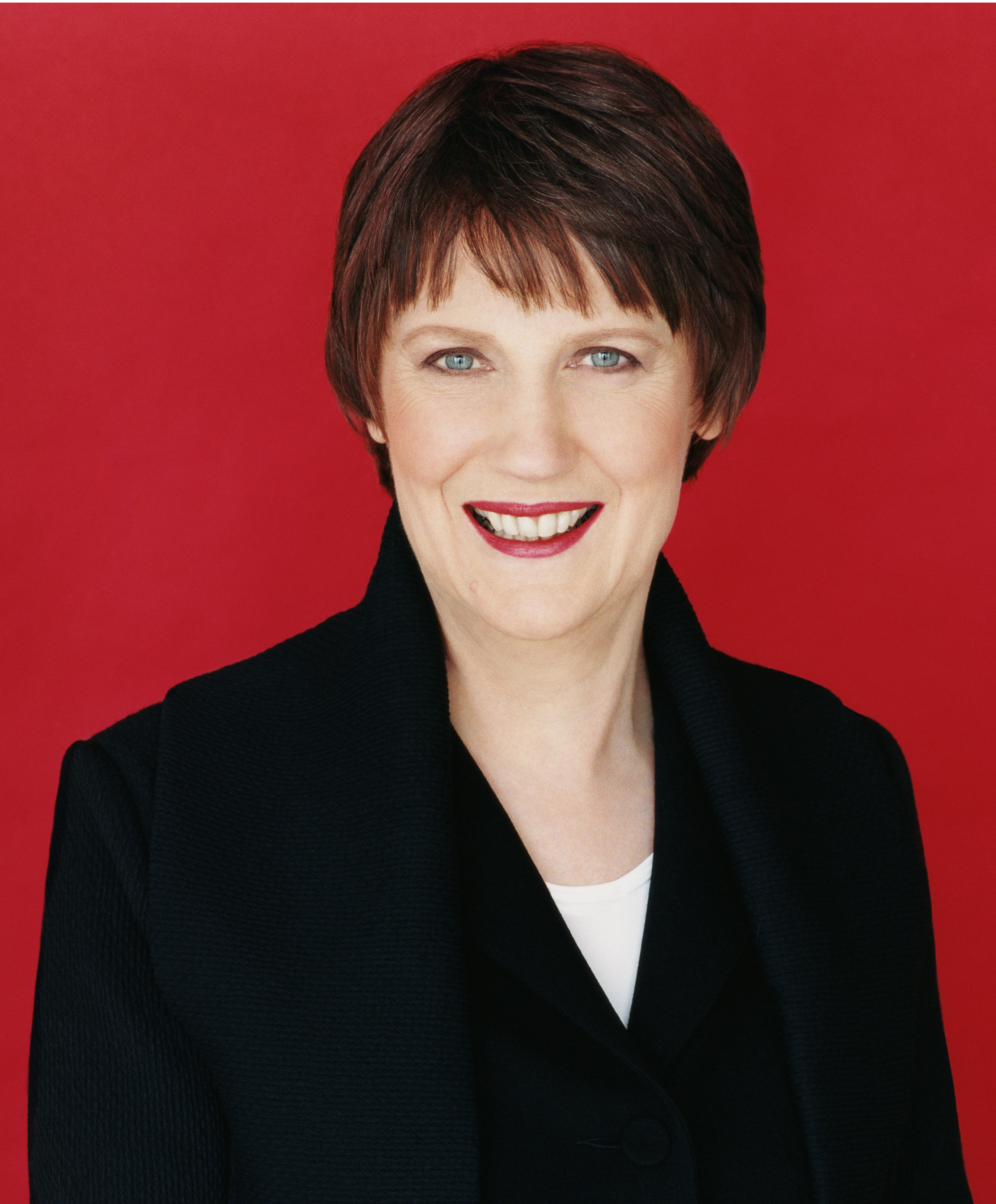
New Zealand
Helen Clark,
Prime Minister

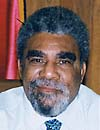
Papua New Guinea
Mekere Morauta,
Prime Minister

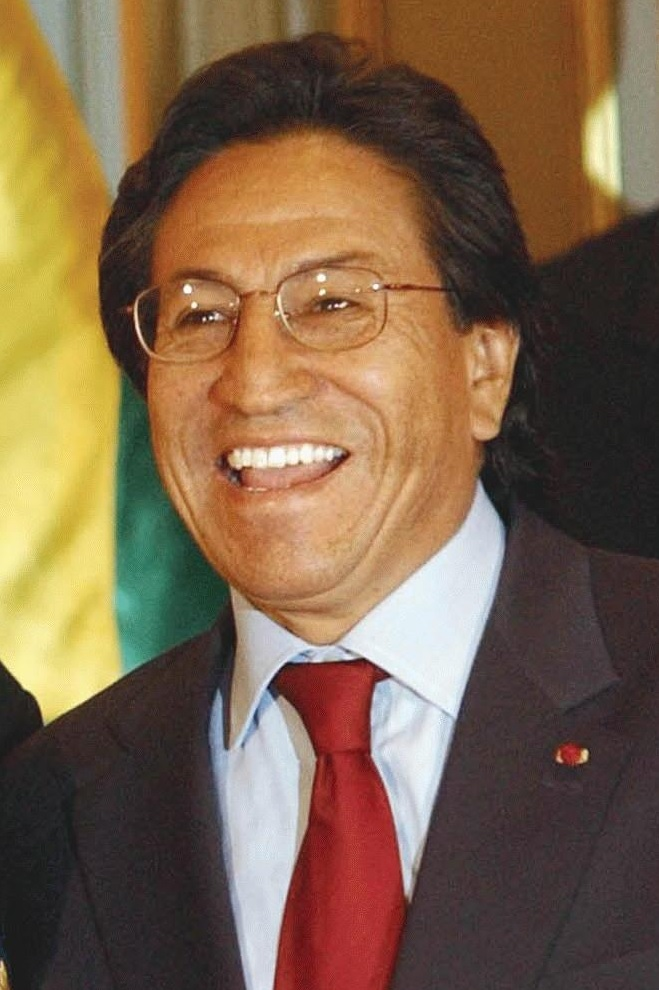
Peru
Alejandro Toledo,
President

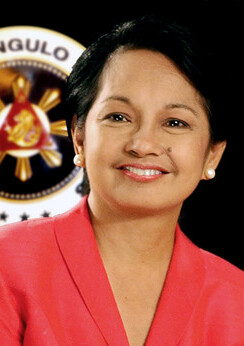
Philippines
Gloria Macapagal-Arroyo,
President

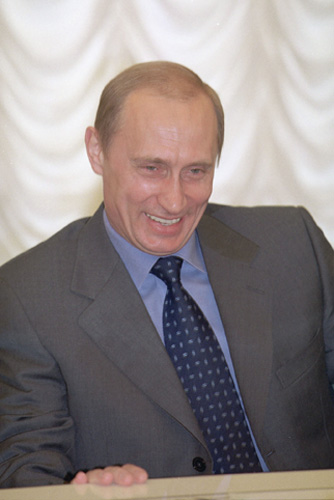
Russia
Vladimir Putin,
President

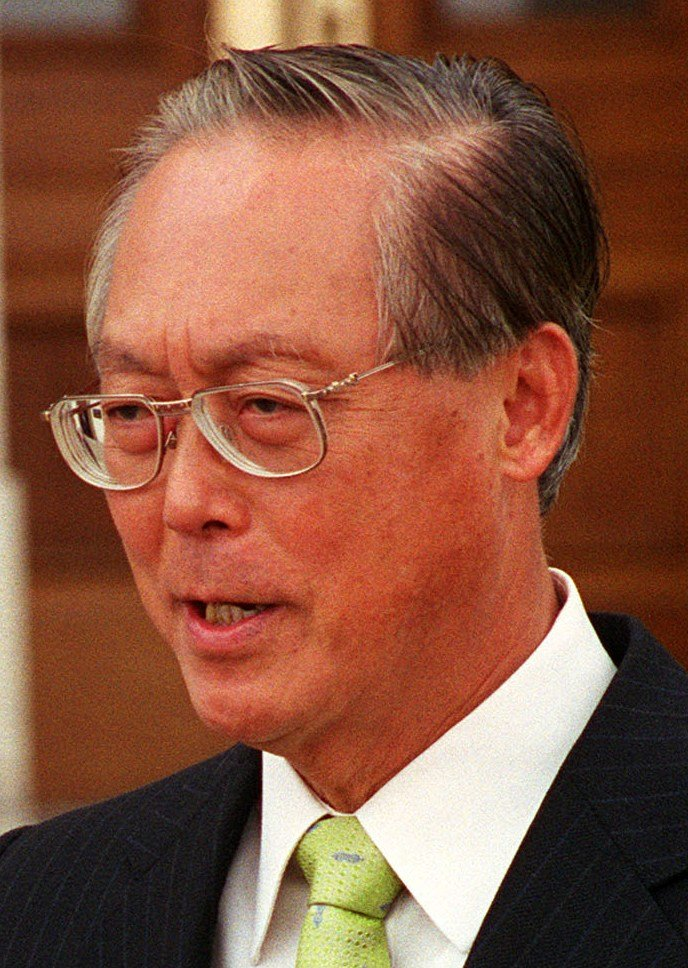
Singapore
Goh Chok Tong,
Prime Minister

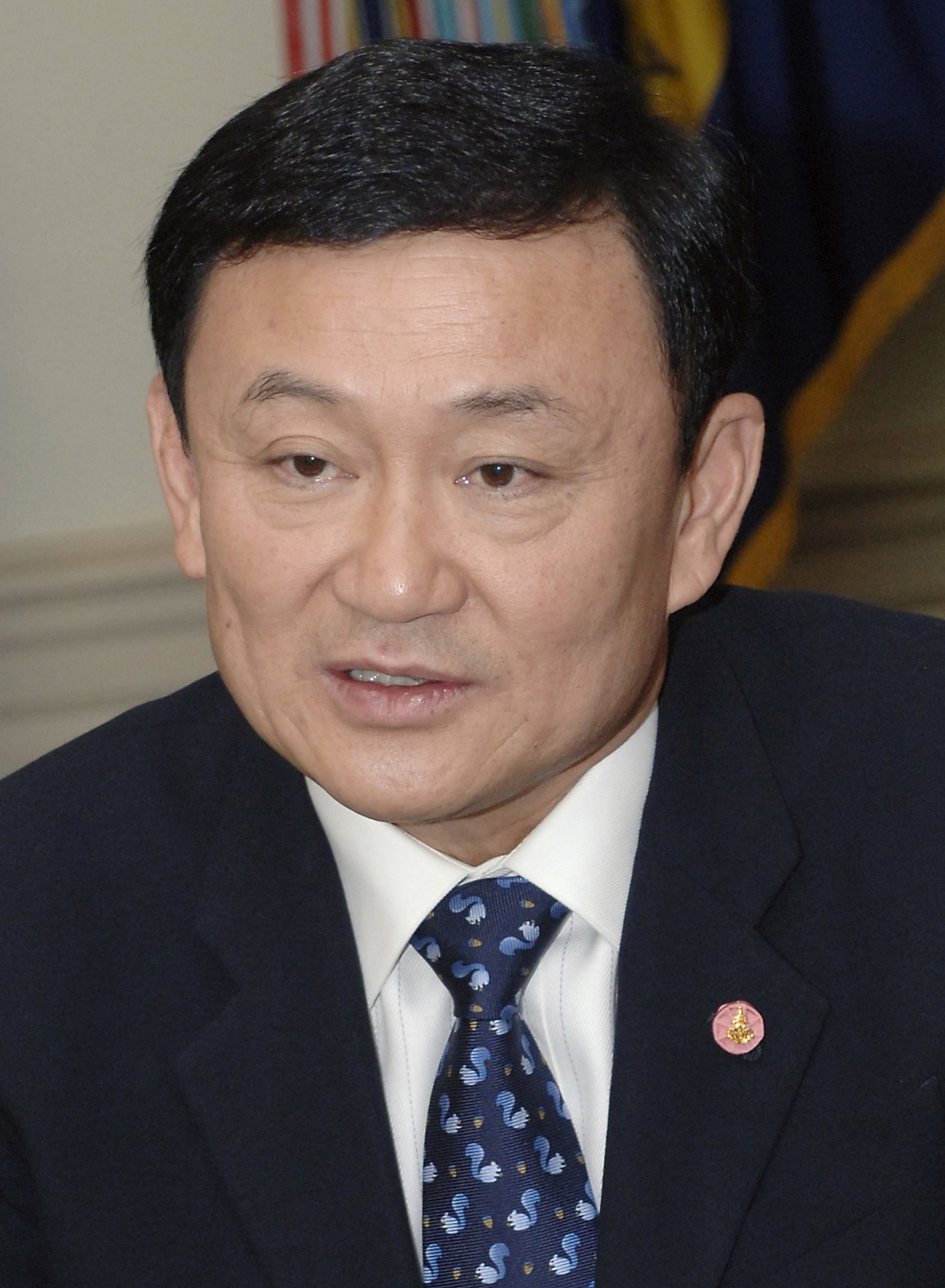
Thailand
Thaksin Shinawatra,
Prime Minister

United States
George W. Bush,
President

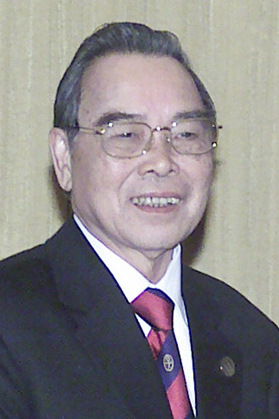
Vietnam
Phan Văn Khải,
Prime Minister

The heads of state and their entourages arrived on 39 separate VIP planes. Chen Shui-bian, the president of the Republic of China (also known as "Taiwan" and to APEC as the name of "Chinese Taipei"), was expressly forbidden from attendance by the Foreign Ministry of PRC; his replacement—former vice president Lee Yuan-tsu—was also refused entry on the grounds that he was also a political rather than an economic representative.

63 other VIP planes brought other political and business leaders to the October meetings in Shanghai. General Motors CEO John F. Smith Jr.; AOL Time Warner CEO Gerald Levin; Hewlett-Packard CEO Carly Fiorina; and IT leaders Bill Gates, Li Dongsheng, and Wang Zhiti attended the CEO summit.

== Legacy ==
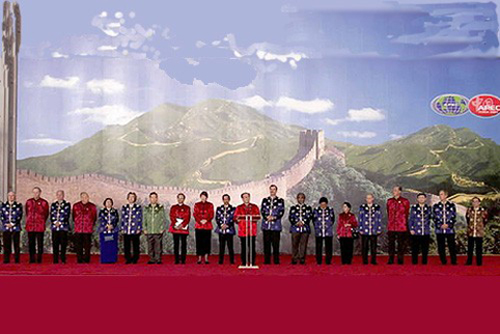
Jiang Zemin reading the 2001 Leaders' Declaration before the other assembled heads of state, all dressed in tang jackets.

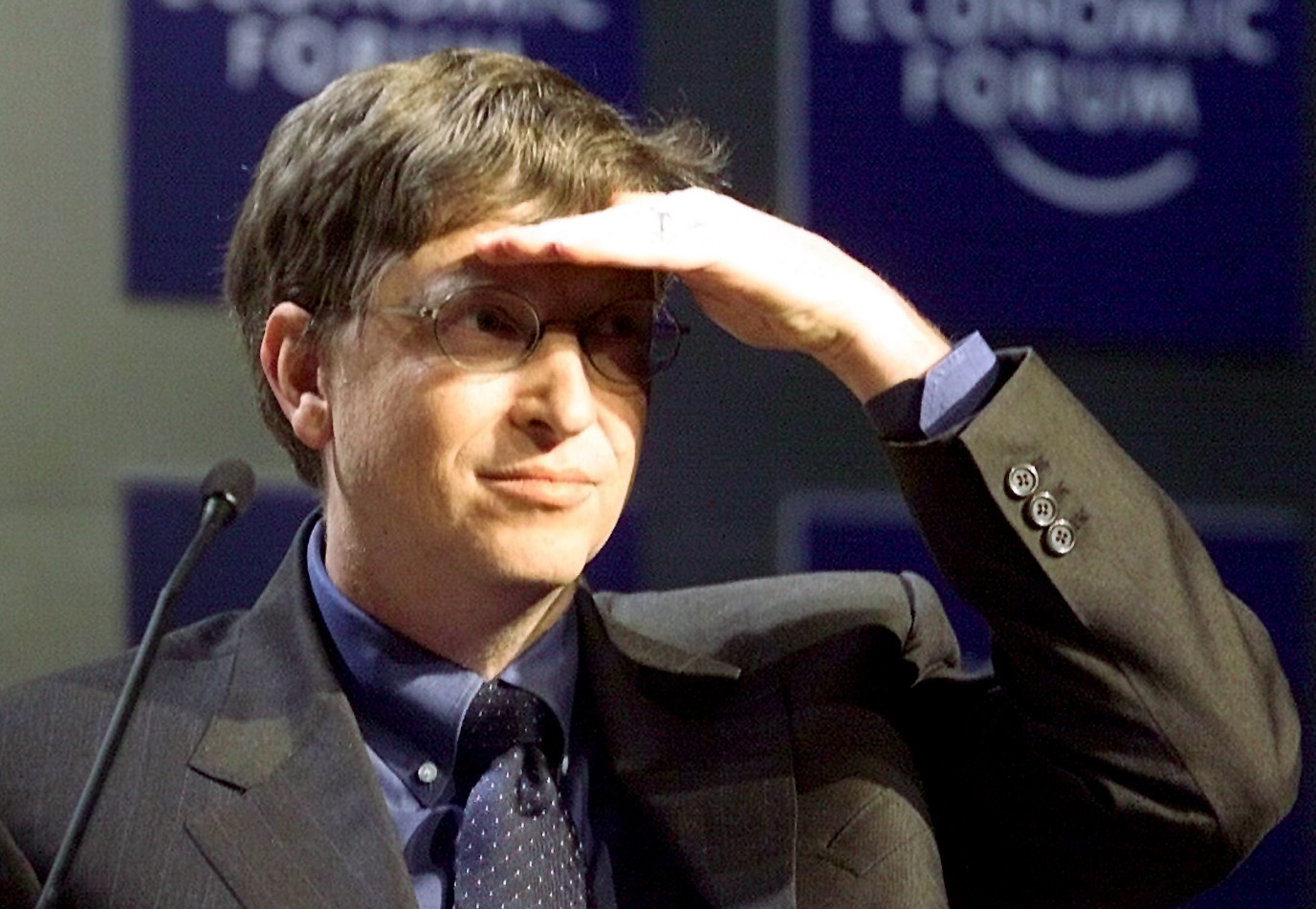
Bill Gates (seen pictured elsewhere in 2001) also attended APEC China 2001, whose leaders agreed to actions to reduce the "digital divide" between its more and less developed members

The leaders agreed that, despite the sound fundamentals of their economies, the impact of the attacks on an already weak short-term outlook meant that they should "act quickly and decisively to stabilize markets, boost global demand, and facilitate an early pick-up in global economic activity". The Shanghai Accord (Note: The proposal was originally called "the Shanghai Charter", but this was revised because of unforeseen legal complications caused by that phrasing.) iterated the group's support for the 1994 Bogor Goals of reducing tariffs between one another to zero by the year 2020. The importance of China to such action—at the time, it was the only country in the Asia-Pacific region experiencing rapid economic growth—led to renewed support for its impending ascension to full membership in the World Trade Organization and prompted calls to "work together to fight against protectionism in all forms". Some smaller states like Malaysia had expressed discontent in Shanghai with how globalization placed the rich "firmly in control". US trade representative Robert Zoellick praised China for its efforts at APEC and the following months for pushing such member economies to join the Doha round of trade negotiations.

In light of the growing importance of the internet, the leaders also agreed to take steps—including two programs arranged at the earlier ministerial meetings—to expand digital penetration to all members, with the aim of reducing the "digital divide" between more and less developed states.

The APEC leaders issued a separate counter-terrorism statement, committing to "prevent and suppress all forms of terrorist acts in the future", including enacting regulations and legislation to prevent terrorist funding. Bush spoke of the fight against terrorism as "the urgent task of our time", claiming "there is no isolation from evil" and "every nation must oppose this enemy or turn into its target". He used the conferences, particularly his centerpiece address, as an opportunity to enlist the support of Asian political and business leaders for counterterrorism and his nascent war in Afghanistan, as well as economic recovery from the attacks. Some efforts were weakened by resistance from APEC's three majority Muslim states, Indonesia, Malaysia, and Brunei. Chinese officials also initially attempted to maintain the summit's economic focus before yielding to American concerns. In the end, both Jiang and Putin spoke strongly about the need to "unswervingly oppose... terrorism in any form, whenever and wherever it occurs and who[m]ever it targets", while particularly connecting such opposition to Russia's ongoing Chechnyan Conflict and China's issues tamping down Uyghur separatism, both of which had drawn some international complaints. (Note: Bush pushed back against this tack in public, noting at a joint press conference with Jiang that "the war on terrorism must never be an excuse to persecute minorities".) Rather than considering these cases separately, Jiang advocated "a unanimous attitude and a sole standard should be adopted in fighting terrorism and... all forms of terrorism should be opposed and crushed". At the same time, Jiang emphasized that reprisals against terrorism—such as that beginning to be untaken by the United States—should be undertaken within UN guidelines and frameworks. In the months following APEC, the United Nations Security Council would unanimously pass Resolutions 1377 (concerning international counterterrorism); 1378 and 1383 (condemning the existing government of Afghanistan and envisioning its future replacement under UN auspices); and 1386 (authorizing the International Security Assistance Force to assist the US military in the removal of the existing Afghani government).

The Leaders' Family Photo—an annual "silly shirt" ritual where world leaders don traditional outfits presented by their host—presented a quandary to Chinese officials, since the available options of representative clothing were by turns too revolutionary (Mao suits), too imperialist (Qing changshan and qipao), too archaic (earlier Hanfu), or too international (business suits). In lieu of selecting any of these, Jiang presented world leaders with the "tang suit" or tangzhuang, an "ambiguously traditional" silk jacket with a Mandarin collar and knotted buttons that employed western sartorial techniques like draping, darts, set-in sleeves, and shoulder pads to create a stronger and more fitted look. Every leader at APEC 2001 wore one of them—most opting for blue or red—with a pattern of embroidered peonies surrounding APEC logos. A "tangzhuang craze" began immediately among the Chinese and continued over the next few years. Although the APEC jackets' fabric was supposedly enhanced with advanced synthetic fiber and the outfit's designers took pains to highlight its modern elements, the new tangzhuangs were made in silk in such numbers that it revitalized the industry and have come to be treated as an ethnic costume to wear for traditional festivals. Its inauthenticity in that role—its closest predecessor was the Manchu "horse jacket" (magua) rather than anything from the Tang dynasty—eventually led to the Hanfu movement, aiming to revive ancient and medieval Chinese fashions.

== Notes ==
| Preceded by APEC Brunei 2000 | APEC meetings 2001 | Succeeded by APEC Mexico 2002 |
