= APEC (disambiguation) =

APEC is the common acronym for the Asia-Pacific Economic Cooperation

== Specific annual economic meetings ==
- APEC Australia 1989
- APEC Philippines 1996
- APEC Canada 1997
- APEC China 2001
- APEC Mexico 2002
- APEC Thailand 2003
- APEC Chile 2004
- APEC South Korea 2005
- APEC Vietnam 2006
- APEC Australia 2007
- APEC Peru 2008
- APEC Singapore 2009
- APEC Japan 2010
- APEC United States 2011
- APEC Russia 2012
- APEC Indonesia 2013
- APEC China 2014
- APEC Philippines 2015
- APEC Peru 2016
- APEC Vietnam 2017
- APEC Papua New Guinea 2018
- APEC Chile 2019

== Education ==
- APEC Schools, a chain of schools in the Philippines
- Universidad APEC

== Organizations ==
- Alliance for the Preservation of English in Canada
- Association of Philippine Electric Cooperatives
- Atlantic Provinces Economic Council

== Other uses ==
- Action Programme on the Elimination of Child Labour (National Action Plan on the Elimination of Child Labour)
- AP European History
- APEXC (APE(X)C), one of a line of computers

== See also ==
- AIPAC
- APAC
