= List of international prime ministerial trips made by Junichiro Koizumi =

The following is a list of international prime ministerial trips made by Junichiro Koizumi during his tenure as the Prime Minister of Japan.

== Summary ==
The number of visits per country where he has travelled are:

- One visit to: Australia, Belgium, Brazil, Brunei, Cambodia, Chile, Czech Republic, Egypt, Ethiopia, Finland, Ghana, Greece, India, Israel, Italy, Jordan, Kazakhstan, Laos, Luxembourg, Mongolia, the Netherlands, New Zealand, Palestine, Pakistan, the Philippines, Poland, Saudi Arabia, Singapore, Spain, South Africa, Sweden, Timor-Leste, Turkey, and Uzbekistan
- Two visits to: Canada, France, Germany, Indonesia, Malaysia, Mexico, North Korea, Russia, Thailand, and Vietnam
- Three visits to: China and the United Kingdom
- Five visits to: South Korea
- Seven visits to: the United States

== 2001 ==
No.	Country	Locations	Dates	Details
1	United States	Washington, D.C.	29 June – 1 July	Met with President George W. Bush at Camp David.
2	United Kingdom	London	1–2 July	Met with Prime Minister Tony Blair.
3	France	Paris	3–4 July	Met with President Jacques Chirac.
4	Italy	Genoa	20–22 July	Attended the 27th G8 summit.
5	United States	New York City, Washington, D.C.	24–25 September	Visited New York City following the September 11 attacks and met with President George W. Bush in Washington, D.C.
6	China	Beijing	8 October	Visited the Marco Polo Bridge and met with President Jiang Zemin and Premier Zhu Rongji.
7	South Korea	Seoul	15 October	Met with President Kim Dae-jung and visited Seodaemun Prison History Hall.
8	China	Shanghai	20–22 October	Attended the APEC leaders' meeting.
9	Brunei	Bandar Seri Begawan	5–6 November	Attended the ASEAN Plus Three summit.
10	Belgium	Brussels	8 December	Attended the EU–Japan summit.

== 2002 ==
No.	Country	Locations	Dates	Details
1	Philippines	Manila	9 January	First stop of his Southeast Asia tour; met with President Gloria Macapagal Arroyo.
2	Malaysia	Kuala Lumpur	10 January	Met with Prime Minister Mahathir Mohamad.
3	Thailand	Bangkok	11 January	Met with Prime Minister Thaksin Shinawatra.
4	Indonesia	Jakarta	12 January	Met with President Megawati Sukarnoputri.
5	Singapore	Singapore	13 January	Delivered a policy speech on a Japan–ASEAN "community" and met with Prime Minister Goh Chok Tong.
6	South Korea	Seoul	21–22 March	Met with President Kim Dae-jung.
7	China	Boao, Hainan	11–12 April	Attended the Boao Forum for Asia and met with Premier Zhu Rongji.
8	Vietnam	Hanoi	27–28 April	Met with Prime Minister Phan Văn Khải.
9	Timor-Leste	Dili	29 April	Met with Xanana Gusmão, then president-elect, ahead of the country's independence.
10	Australia	Sydney	1 May	Met with Prime Minister John Howard.
11	New Zealand	Auckland	2 May	Met with Prime Minister Helen Clark.
12	Canada	Kananaskis	26–27 June	Attended the 28th G8 summit.
13	South Africa	Johannesburg	3 September	Attended the World Summit on Sustainable Development.
14	United States	New York City	10 September	Visited the World Trade Center site on the eve of the first anniversary of the September 11 attacks.
15	North Korea	Pyongyang	17 September	Met with leader Kim Jong Il at the first Japan–North Korea summit; Kim admitted to the abduction of Japanese citizens.
16	Mexico	Los Cabos	26–27 October	Attended the APEC leaders' meeting.
17	Cambodia	Phnom Penh	4–5 November	Attended the ASEAN Plus Three summit.

== 2003 ==
No.	Country	Locations	Dates	Details
1	Russia	Moscow	9–12 January	Met with President Vladimir Putin; the two leaders signed the Japan–Russia Action Plan.
2	South Korea	Seoul	25 February	Attended the inauguration of President Roh Moo-hyun.
3	United Kingdom	London	26 April	Met with Prime Minister Tony Blair at the start of a European tour.
4	Spain	Madrid	28 April	Met with Prime Minister José María Aznar.
5	France	Paris	29 April	Met with President Jacques Chirac.
6	Germany	Berlin	30 April	Met with Chancellor Gerhard Schröder.
7	Greece	Athens	2 May	Attended the EU–Japan summit, held during the Greek presidency of the Council of the EU.
8	United States	Crawford, Texas	22–24 May	Met with President George W. Bush at his ranch in Crawford.
9	Egypt	Cairo	24 May	Met with President Hosni Mubarak.
10	Saudi Arabia	Riyadh	25 May	Met with Crown Prince Abdullah.
11	Russia	Saint Petersburg	30–31 May	Attended the celebrations for the 300th anniversary of the city and met with President Putin.
12	Germany	Berlin	18 August	Met with Chancellor Gerhard Schröder at the start of a Europe tour.
13	Poland	Warsaw	19–20 August	Met with Prime Minister Leszek Miller.
14	Czech Republic	Prague	21 August	Met with Prime Minister Vladimír Špidla.
15	Thailand	Bangkok	20–21 October	Attended the APEC leaders' meeting.

== 2004 ==
No.	Country	Locations	Dates	Details
1	North Korea	Pyongyang	22 May	Second summit with Kim Jong Il; five abductees' family members returned to Japan with him.
2	United States	Sea Island	8–10 June	Attended the 30th G8 summit.
3	South Korea	Jeju	21–22 July	Met with President Roh Moo-hyun.
4	Brazil	Brasília	15 September	Met with President Luiz Inácio Lula da Silva.
5	Mexico	Mexico City	17 September	Met with President Vicente Fox; the two countries signed an economic partnership agreement.
6	United States	New York City	20–21 September	Attended the United Nations General Assembly and called for Japan to be given a permanent seat on the United Nations Security Council.
7	Vietnam	Hanoi	8–9 October	Attended the ASEM summit.
8	Chile	Santiago	19–22 November	Attended the APEC leaders' meeting, where he was scheduled to hold talks with Chinese president Hu Jintao, Russian president Vladimir Putin, Chilean president Ricardo Lagos and U.S. president George W. Bush.
9	Laos	Vientiane	29–30 November	Attended the ASEAN Plus Three summit.

== 2005 ==
No.	Country	Locations	Dates	Details
1	Indonesia	Jakarta	22–23 April	Attended the Asian–African Summit marking the 50th anniversary of the Bandung Conference.
2	India	New Delhi	29–30 April	Met with Prime Minister Manmohan Singh.
3	Pakistan	Islamabad	30 April – 1 May	Met with President Pervez Musharraf.
4	Luxembourg	Luxembourg City	2 May	Attended the EU–Japan summit, held during the Luxembourg presidency of the Council of the EU.
5	Netherlands	The Hague	3 May	Met with Prime Minister Jan Peter Balkenende.
6	United Kingdom	Gleneagles	6–8 July	Attended the 31st G8 summit.
7	South Korea	Busan	18–19 November	Attended the APEC leaders' meeting.
8	Malaysia	Kuala Lumpur	12–14 December	Attended the ASEAN Plus Three summit and the inaugural East Asia Summit.

== 2006 ==
No.	Country	Locations	Dates	Details
1	Turkey	Ankara	10 January	Met with Prime Minister Recep Tayyip Erdoğan.
2	Ethiopia	Addis Ababa	1–2 May	Met with Prime Minister Meles Zenawi during an Africa tour.
3	Ghana	Accra	2–3 May	Visited the Noguchi Memorial Institute for Medical Research and met with President John Kufuor.
4	Sweden	Stockholm	4–5 May	Met with Prime Minister Göran Persson.
5	Canada	Ottawa	27 June	Met with Prime Minister Stephen Harper.
6	United States	Washington, D.C., Memphis	28–30 June	Met with President George W. Bush and visited Graceland, the home of Elvis Presley.
7	Israel	Jerusalem	12 July	Met with Prime Minister Ehud Olmert.
8	Palestine	Jericho	13 July	Met with President Mahmoud Abbas.
9	Jordan	Amman	13–14 July	Met with King Abdullah II.
10	Mongolia	Ulaanbaatar	10–11 August	Met with President Nambaryn Enkhbayar.
11	Kazakhstan	Astana	28–29 August	Met with President Nursultan Nazarbayev.
12	Uzbekistan	Tashkent	29–30 August	Met with President Islam Karimov.
13	Finland	Helsinki	10–11 September	Attended the ASEM summit.

== Multilateral meetings ==
Prime Minister Koizumi attended the following summits during his prime ministership (2001–2006):

Group	Year					
Group	2001	2002	2003	2004	2005	2006
UNGA	September, (United States) New York City	September, (United States) New York City	September, (United States) New York City	September, (United States) New York City	September, (United States) New York City	September, (United States) New York City
APEC	20–21 October, (China) Shanghai	26–27 October, (Mexico) Los Cabos	20–21 October, (Thailand) Bangkok	20–21 November, (Chile) Santiago	18–19 November, (South Korea) Busan	
G8	21–22 July, (Italy) Genoa	26–27 June, (Canada) Kananaskis	1–2 June (France) Évian-les-Bains	8–10 June, (United States) Sea Island	6–8 July, (United Kingdom) Gleneagles	15–17 July, (Russia) St. Petersburg
