= List of international prime ministerial trips made by Jean Chrétien =

International trips made by Jean Chrétien

Jean Chrétien, the 20th prime minister of Canada, made 33 international trips to 21 countries during his premiership from November 4, 1993, to December 12, 2003.

== Summary ==
Prime Minister Jean Chrétien led multiple international delegations, including major signature "Team Canada" trade missions alongside provincial premiers to major markets in Asia, Latin America, and Europe.

The number of visits per country where Prime Minister Chrétien travelled are:

- One visit to Argentina, Australia, Brazil, Brunei, the Czech Republic, India, Indonesia, Malaysia, New Zealand, Nigeria, Poland, South Africa, Spain and Thailand.
- Two visits to Chile, Germany, Italy, the Mexico, Philippines, Russia and the United Kingdom.
- Three visits to China, France and Japan.
- Four visits to the United States

== 1993 ==
| # | Country | Location | Date | Details | Image |
|---|---|---|---|---|---|
| 1 | United States | Seattle | November 19–20 | Attended the APEC United States 1993 summit. | |

== 1994 ==
| # | Country | Location | Date | Details | Image |
|---|---|---|---|---|---|
| 1 | Italy | Naples | July 8–10 | Attended the 20th G7 summit. | |
| 2 | China | Beijing, Shanghai, Guangzhou | November 5–10 | Led the inaugural Team Canada trade mission to China accompanied by provincial premiers. | |
| 3 | Indonesia | Bogor | November 15–16 | Attended the APEC Indonesia 1994 summit. | |
| 4 | United States | Miami | December 9–11 | Attended the 1st Summit of the Americas. | |

== 1995 ==
| # | Country | Location | Date | Details | Image |
|---|---|---|---|---|---|
| 1 | Russia | Moscow | May 9 | Attended the 1995 Moscow Victory Day Parades. | |
| 2 | New Zealand | Auckland | November 10–13 | Attended the 1995 Commonwealth Heads of Government Meeting. | |
| 3 | Japan | Osaka | November 18–19 | Attended the APEC Japan 1995 summit. | |

== 1996 ==
| # | Country | Location | Date | Details | Image |
|---|---|---|---|---|---|
| 1 | India | Mumbai, New Delhi | January 8–14 | Led a Team Canada trade mission alongside seven provincial premiers. | |
| 2 | France | Lyon | June 27–29 | Attended the 22nd G7 summit. Met with Russian Prime Minister Viktor Chernomyrdin and UN Secretary-General Boutros Boutros-Ghali. | |
| 3 | Philippines | Manila, Subic Bay | November 24–25 | Attended the 1996 APEC Economic Leaders' Meeting. | |

== 1997 ==
| # | Country | Location | Date | Details | Image |
|---|---|---|---|---|---|
| 1 | Philippines | Manila | January 14–16 | Official visit following trade discussions in the region. | |
| 2 | United States | Denver | June 20–22 | Attended the 23rd G8 summit. | |
| 3 | Spain | Madrid | July 8–9 | Attended the 1997 Madrid NATO Summit. | |
| 4 | United Kingdom | Edinburgh | October 24–27 | Attended the 1997 Commonwealth Heads of Government Meeting. | |

== 1998 ==
| # | Country | Location | Date | Details | Image |
|---|---|---|---|---|---|
| 1 | Mexico; Brazil; Argentina; Chile | Mexico City, São Paulo, Buenos Aires, Santiago | January 11–22 | Led a 10-day Team Canada trade mission across South and Central America. | |
| 2 | Chile | Santiago | April 18–19 | Attended the 2nd Summit of the Americas. | |
| 3 | United Kingdom | Birmingham | May 15–17 | Attended the 24th G8 summit. | |
| 4 | Malaysia | Kuala Lumpur | November 17–18 | Attended the APEC Malaysia 1998 summit. | |

== 1999 ==
| # | Country | Location | Date | Details | Image |
|---|---|---|---|---|---|
| 1 | Poland | Auschwitz, Birkenau | January 25 | Visited the former Nazi concentration camps at Auschwitz and Birkenau, becoming the first sitting Canadian prime minister to visit Poland. | |
| 2 | United States | Washington, D.C. | April 23–25 | Attended the 50th Anniversary NATO Summit. | |
| 3 | Germany | Cologne | June 17–21 | Attended the 25th G8 summit. | |
| 4 | Japan | Tokyo, Osaka | September 11–16 | Led Team Canada trade mission to Japan. | |
| 5 | South Africa | Durban, George | November 11–14 | Attended the 1999 Commonwealth Heads of Government Meeting. | |

== 2000 ==
| # | Country | Location | Date | Details | Image |
|---|---|---|---|---|---|
| 1 | Japan | Nago | July 21–23 | Attended the 26th G8 summit. | |
| 2 | Brunei | Bandar Seri Begawan | November 15–16 | Attended the APEC Brunei 2000 summit. | |

== 2001 ==
| # | Country | Location | Date | Details | Image |
|---|---|---|---|---|---|
| 1 | China | Beijing, Shanghai, Hong Kong | February 9–18 | Led Team Canada 2001 trade mission with provincial premiers. | |
| 2 | Italy | Genoa | July 20–24 | Attended the 27th G8 summit. | |
| 3 | China | Shanghai | October 20–21 | Attended the APEC summit. | |

== 2002 ==
| # | Country | Location | Date | Details | Image |
|---|---|---|---|---|---|
| 1 | Russia; Germany | Moscow, Berlin, Munich | February 12–20 | Led a Team Canada trade mission focused on expanding commercial links with Russia and Germany. | |
| 2 | Australia | Coolum Beach | March 2–5 | Attended the 2002 Commonwealth Heads of Government Meeting. | |
| 3 | Mexico | Los Cabos | October 26–27 | Attended the APEC summit. | |
| 4 | Czech Republic | Prague | November 21–22 | Attended the Prague NATO Summit. | |

== 2003 ==
| # | Country | Location | Date | Details | Image |
|---|---|---|---|---|---|
| 1 | France | Évian-les-Bains | June 1–2 | Attended the 29th G8 summit. | |
| 2 | Thailand | Bangkok | October 20–21 | Attended the APEC summit. | |
| 3 | Nigeria | Abuja | December 5–8 | Attended the 2003 Commonwealth Heads of Government Meeting. | |
| 4 | France | Paris | December 9 | Conducted his final official foreign visit as Prime Minister before stepping down. | |

== Multilateral meetings ==
Multilateral meetings of the following intergovernmental organizations took place during Jean Chrétien's Premiership (1993–2003).

| Group | Year | | | | | | | | | | |
| Group | 1993 | 1994 | 1995 | 1996 | 1997 | 1998 | 1999 | 2000 | 2001 | 2002 | 2003 |
|---|---|---|---|---|---|---|---|---|---|---|---|
| APEC | November 19–20, (United States) Seattle | November 15–16, (Indonesia) Bogor | November 18–19, (Japan) Osaka | November 24–25, (Philippines) Subic | November 24–25, (Canada) Vancouver | November 17–18, (Malaysia) Kuala Lumpur | September 12–13, (New Zealand) Auckland | November 15–16, (Brunei) Bandar Seri Begawan | October 20–21, (China) Shanghai | October 26–27, (Mexico) Los Cabos | October 20–21, (Thailand) Bangkok |
| G7 / G8 | | July 8–10, (Italy) Naples | June 15–17, (Canada) Halifax | June 27–29, (France) Lyon | June 20–22, (United States) Denver | May 15–17, (United Kingdom) Birmingham | June 18–20, (Germany) Cologne | July 21–23, (Japan) Nago | July 21–22, (Italy) Genoa | June 26–27, (Canada) Kananaskis | June 1–2, (France) Évian-les-Bains |
| NATO | none | January 10–11, (Belgium) Brussels | none | none | May 27, (France) Paris | none | April 23–25, (United States) Washington | none | June 13, (Belgium) Brussels | May 28, (Italy) Rome | none |
| NATO | none | January 10–11, (Belgium) Brussels | none | none | July 8–9, (Spain) Madrid | none | April 23–25, (United States) Washington | none | June 13, (Belgium) Brussels | November 21–22, (Czech Republic) Prague | none |
| SOA (OAS) | none | December 9–11, (United States) Miami | none | none | none | April 18–19, (Chile) Santiago | none | none | April 20–22, (Canada) Quebec City | none | none |
| OSCE | none | December 5–6, (Hungary) Budapest | none | December 2–3, (Portugal) Lisbon | none | none | November 18–19, (Turkey) Istanbul | none | | | |
| OIF | November 16–17, (Madagascar) Antananarivo | none | October 16–18, (Mauritius) Curepipe | none | November 3–6, (Vietnam) Hanoi | none | September 3–5, (Canada) Moncton | none | | October 18–20, (Lebanon) Beirut | none |
| CHOGM | | none | November 10–13, (New Zealand) Auckland | none | October 24–27, (United Kingdom) Edinburgh | none | November 12–14, (South Africa) Durban | none | | March 2–5, (Australia) Coolum Beach | December 5–8, (Nigeria) Abuja |
██ = Did not attend; ██ = No meeting held.

== See also ==
- Foreign relations of Canada
- List of international prime ministerial trips made by Kim Campbell, his predecessor
- List of international prime ministerial trips made by Paul Martin, his successor
- Team Canada Mission
