= United Nations Security Council Resolution 1401 =

2002 UNSC resolution endorsing the creation of a UN peacekeeping mission in Afghanistan

UN Security Council Resolution 1401
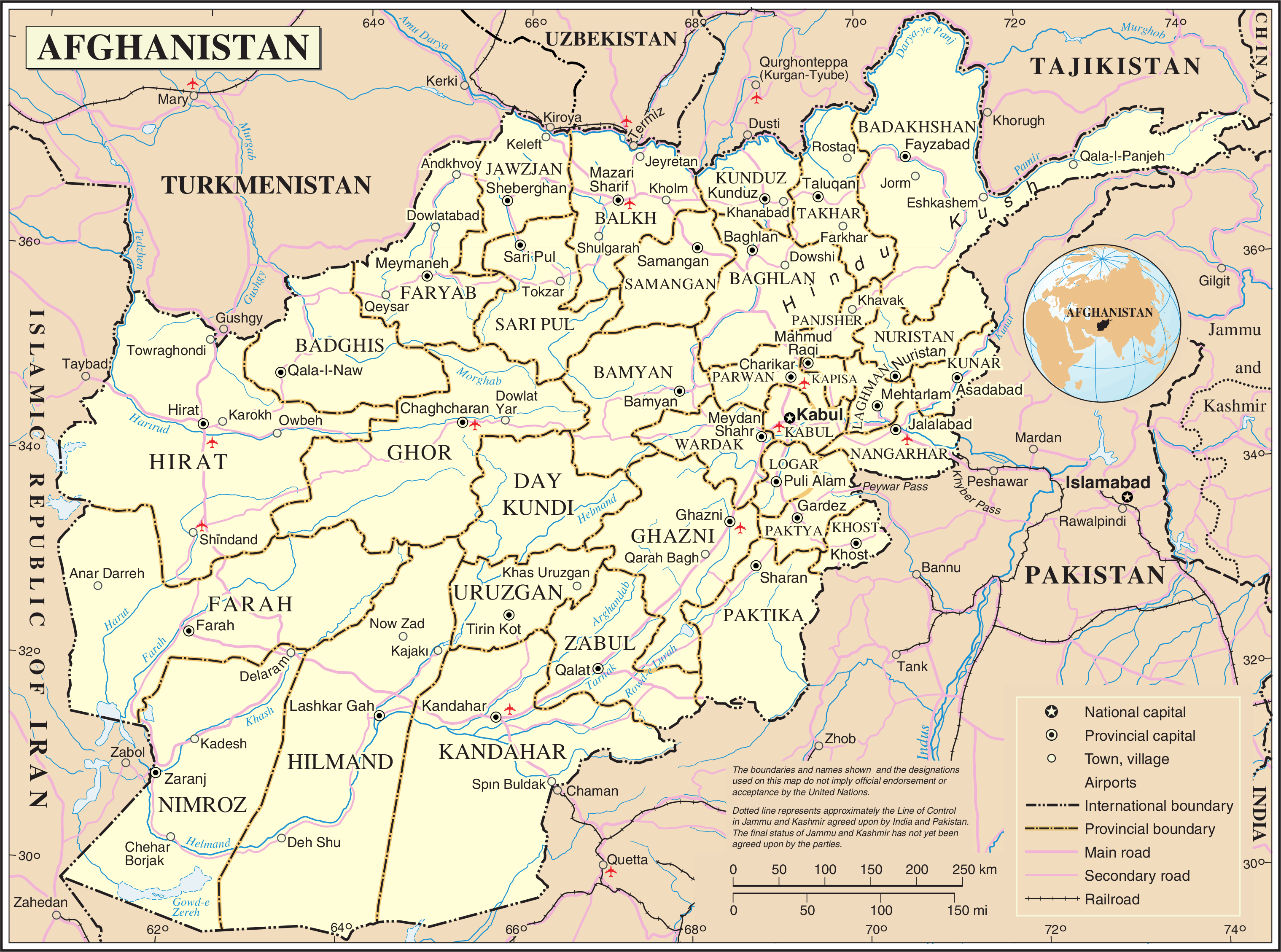
- Afghanistan
- Date: 28 March 2002
- Meeting no.: 4,501
- Code: S/RES/1401 (Document)
- Subject: The situation in Afghanistan
- Voting summary: 15 voted for; None voted against; None abstained
- Result: Adopted

Security Council composition
- Permanent members: China; France; Russia; United Kingdom; United States
- Non-permanent members: Bulgaria; Cameroon; Colombia; Guinea; Ireland; Mauritius; Mexico; Norway; Singapore; Syria

United Nations Security Council resolution 1401, adopted unanimously on 28 March 2002, after recalling all previous resolutions on the situation in Afghanistan, including resolutions 1378 (2001), 1383 (2001) and 1386 (2001), the Council endorsed the establishment of the United Nations Assistance Mission in Afghanistan (UNAMA). It would replace the longstanding United Nations Special Mission to Afghanistan.

The Security Council recalled its support for the Bonn Agreement and the right of the Afghan people to determine their own political future. It stressed the importance of combating the illegal drug trade, arms trafficking and threat of land mines, and encouraged donor countries that pledged financial aid to fulfil their commitments.

The resolution endorsed the establishment of UNAMA for an initial period of 12 months with a mandate and structure described in a report of the Secretary-General Kofi Annan. According to the report, UNAMA would focus on two main areas: political affairs and on relief, recovery and reconstruction with offices across the country. The Council reaffirmed the role of the Special Representative of the Secretary-General Lakhdar Brahimi in the conduct of United Nations activities in Afghanistan. Afghan parties were urged to ensure the security and freedom of movement of UNAMA personnel.

The Council stressed the provision of recovery and reconstruction assistance could assist in the implementation of the Bonn Agreement. Furthermore, it stressed that humanitarian assistance should be provided when needed and for Afghan authorities to maintain a secure environment and respect human rights.

Finally, the International Security Assistance Force was asked to work closely with the Secretary-General and his Special Representative, and the Secretary-General was required to report every four months on the implementation of the current resolution.

== See also ==
- War in Afghanistan (1978–present)
- List of United Nations Security Council Resolutions 1401 to 1500 (2002–2003)
- War in Afghanistan (2001–2021)
