= List of international prime ministerial trips made by Paul Martin =

Paul and Sheila Martin with George and Laura Bush in April 2004

This is a list of international presidential trips made by Paul Martin, the 21st prime minister of Canada, during his premiership from December 12, 2003 to February 6, 2006.

== Summary ==
The number of visits per country where he travelled are:

- One visit to Brazil, China, India, Ireland, Japan, Libya, Mexico, Sri Lanka, Sudan, Thailand, and the United Kingdom
- Five visits to the United States

== 2004 ==
#	Country	Location	Date	Details
1	Mexico	Monterrey	January 12–13	Summit of the Americas
2	United States	New York City	March 1	Working visit
3	United States	Washington, D.C.	April 28–30	Working visit
4	United States	Sea Island, Georgia	June 8–10	30th G8 summit
5	Russia	Moscow, Russia	October 11	Official visit.
6	Chile	Santiago	November 20–21	Attended APEC Chile 2004
6	Brazil	Brasília	November 22–23	Working visit
7	Sudan	Khartoum	November 25	Met with President Omar al-Bashir.
8	Libyan Arab Jamahiriya	Tripoli	December 19–20	Met with Muammar Gaddafi.

== 2005 ==
#	Country	Location	Date	Details	Image
9	Thailand	Phuket province	January 15–16	Official visit	
9	Sri Lanka	Colombo	January 17	Official visit	
9	India	New Delhi	January 18	Official visit	
9	Japan	Tokyo	January 19–20	Official visit	
9	China	Beijing and Hong Kong	January 20–23	Official visit	
10	United States	Crawford and Waco, Texas	March 23	Working visit	
11	Ireland	Dublin	July 6		
11	United Kingdom	Auchterarder	July 6–8	Attended the 31st G8 summit	
12	United States	New York City	September 13–16	Working visit	

== Multilateral meetings ==
Multilateral meetings of the following intergovernmental organizations took place during his premiership.

Group	Year	
Group	2004	2005
APEC	November 20–21 (Chile) Santiago	November 18–19 (South Korea) Busan
G8	June 8–10 (United States) Sea Island	July 6–8 (United Kingdom) Gleneagles
NALS	none	March 23 (United States) Waco
NATO	June 28–29 (Turkey) Istanbul	February 25 (Belgium) Brussels
SOA (OAS)	January 12–13 (Mexico) Monterrey	November 4–5 (Argentina) Mar del Plata
OIF	November 26–27 (Burkina Faso) Ouagadougou	none
CHOGM	none	November 25–27 (Malta) Valletta

== See also ==
- Foreign relations of Canada
- List of international prime ministerial trips made by Jean Chrétien, his predecessor
- List of international prime ministerial trips made by Stephen Harper, his successor
