= Pathum Thani =

- Town
- Location in Bangkok Metropolitan Region Location in Thailand
- Coordinates: 14°3′0″N 100°29′0″E
- Country: Thailand
- Province: Pathum Thani province
- District: Mueang Pathum Thani district

Population (2005)
  - Total: 18,320
- Time zone: UTC+7 (ICT)

Pathum Thani (Thai: ปทุมธานี, pronounced [pā.tʰūm tʰāːnīː]) is a town (thesaban mueang) in central Thailand, directly north of Bangkok. It is the capital of the Pathum Thani province, Thailand as well as the Mueang Pathum Thani district. As of 2005, it has a population of 18,320, covering the complete sub-district (tambon) Bang Parok.

Pathum Thani hosted the 4th APEC Youth Science Festival in 2011. Pathum Thani is home to Pathum Thani Thammasat University which is where AFF Mitsubishi electric cup 2022 is held.
