= United Nations Security Council Resolution 1386 =

UN Security Council Resolution 1386
- ISAF logo
- Date: 20 December 2001
- Meeting no.: 4,443
- Code: S/RES/1386 (Document)
- Subject: The situation in Afghanistan
- Voting summary: 15 voted for; None voted against; None abstained
- Result: Adopted

Security Council composition
- Permanent members: China; France; Russia; United Kingdom; United States
- Non-permanent members: Bangladesh; Colombia; Ireland; Jamaica; Mali; Mauritius; Norway; Singapore; Tunisia; Ukraine

United Nations Security Council resolution 1386, adopted unanimously on 20 December 2001, after reaffirming all resolutions on the situation in Afghanistan, particularly resolutions 1378 (2001) and 1383 (2001), the Council authorised the establishment of the International Security Assistance Force (ISAF) to assist the Afghan Interim Authority in the maintenance of security in Kabul and surrounding areas. It was the final Security Council resolution adopted in 2001.

== Resolution ==
=== Observations ===
The Security Council supported international efforts to eradicate terrorism in accordance with the United Nations Charter, and reaffirmed resolutions 1368 (2001) and 1373 (2001). It welcomed developments in Afghanistan that would give the Afghan people freedom from oppression and terror, and recognised the responsibility of Afghans to provide security and law and order themselves.

The Council reiterated its support for the Bonn Agreement and noted an offer by the United Kingdom to lead ISAF. It stressed the need for all Afghan parties to adhere to human rights and international humanitarian law. Furthermore, the Council determined the situation in Afghanistan to be a threat to international peace and security and intended to ensure the full implementation of ISAF's mandate.

=== Acts ===
Acting under Chapter VII of the United Nations Charter, ISAF was established for an initial period of six months to assist the Afghan Interim Authority with security. Member States were asked to provide contributions of personnel and equipment of ISAF and states participating in the Force were authorised to take all measures in order to fulfil its mandate. All Afghans to cooperate with the ISAF and international governmental and non-governmental organisations.

The resolution noted a commitment made by Afghan parties to withdraw military personnel from Kabul. It encouraged neighbouring states to assist ISAF by providing overflights and transit, and stressed that the expense of the ISAF operation would be borne by participating states with contributions made to a voluntary trust fund established by the Secretary-General Kofi Annan. Furthermore, the Council requested the leadership of ISAF to provide periodic reports on the implementation of its mandate, and for states participating in ISAF to provide training for new Afghan security forces.

== See also ==
- Afghanistan conflict (1978–present)
- List of United Nations Security Council Resolutions 1301 to 1400 (2000–2002)
- United Nations Assistance Mission in Afghanistan
- War in Afghanistan (2001–2021)
