= United Nations Security Council Resolution 1377 =

UN Security Council Resolution 1377
- Global war on terrorism service ribbon issued by the United States Department of Defense
- Date: 12 November 2001
- Meeting no.: 4,413
- Code: S/RES/1377 (Document)
- Subject: Threats to international peace and security caused by terrorist acts
- Voting summary: 15 voted for; None voted against; None abstained
- Result: Adopted

Security Council composition
- Permanent members: China; France; Russia; United Kingdom; United States
- Non-permanent members: Bangladesh; Colombia; Ireland; Jamaica; Mali; Mauritius; Norway; Singapore; Tunisia; Ukraine

United Nations Security Council Resolution 1377 was adopted unanimously at a ministerial meeting on 12 November 2001; the Council adopted a declaration concerning efforts to eliminate international terrorism.

The Security Council, comprising foreign ministers, recalled resolutions 1269 (1999), 1368 (2001) and 1373 (2001) and declared that international terrorism constituted a serious threat to international peace and security in the 21st century and a challenge to all States and to all of humanity. It condemned all terrorist acts as criminal and unjustifiable.

The declaration stressed that terrorism was contrary to the principles enshrined in the United Nations Charter, endangered lives, and threatened the social and economic development of all countries and global stability as a whole. Furthermore, it asserted that a sustained and comprehensive approach was necessary to combat terrorism. To this end, efforts to broaden understanding among civilisations and address conflicts and global issues were required.

Welcoming the commitment of member states to combat international terrorism, the Council called upon all countries to implement Resolution 1373 and assist others in doing so. The Security Council also recognised the progress made by the Counter-Terrorism Committee and noted that some countries required assistance in implementing all of the provisions of Resolution 1373. It invited the Counter-Terrorism Committee to explore ways to assist states, promote best-practice, identify technical, financial, regulatory, legislative or other assistance programmes and examine links synergies between the programmes.

Finally, the declaration called upon all states to intensify efforts to eliminate international terrorism.

== See also ==
- Anti-terrorism legislation
- Counterterrorism
- List of terrorist incidents
- List of United Nations Security Council Resolutions 1301 to 1400 (2000–2002)
