= List of international prime ministerial trips made by Stephen Harper =

Stephen Harper, the 22nd prime minister of Canada, made 49 international trips to 30 countries during his premiership from February 6, 2006, to November 4, 2015.

== Summary ==
The number of visits per country where Prime Minister Harper travelled are:

- One visit to Belgium, Brazil, Colombia, Indonesia, Ireland, Italy, Latvia, Netherlands, Panama, Peru, Philippines, Portugal, Romania, Singapore, South Africa, Vietnam
- Two visits to India, Japan, Poland and Trinidad and Tobago
- Three visits to Australia, Germany, Russia, South Korea and Ukraine
- Four visits to Mexico and United Kingdom
- Five visits to France
- Twelve visits to United States

== 2006 ==
#	Country	Location	Date	Details	Image
1	Mexico	Cancún	March 31	Harper travelled to Cancún to attend the North American Leaders' Summit with President Vincente Fox and U.S. President George W. Bush.	
2	United States	Washington, D.C.	July 6	Harper travelled to Washington, D.C. to meet with President George W. Bush.	
3	Russia	St. Petersburg	July 15–17	Harper travelled to St. Petersburg to attend the G8 summit.	
4	Vietnam	Hanoi	November 18–19	Harper travelled to Hanoi to attend the APEC Summit.	
5	Latvia	Riga	November 28–29	Harper travelled to Riga to attend NATO summit.	

== 2007 ==
#	Country	Location	Date	Details	Image
1	Germany	Heiligendamm	June 6–8	Harper travelled to Heiligendamm to attend the G8 summit.	
2	Australia	Sydney, Canberra	September 8–11	Harper travelled to Sydney to attend the APEC Summit. On September 11, Harper addressed its Parliament.	

== 2008 ==
#	Country	Location	Date	Details	Image
1	Romania	Bucharest	April 2–4	Harper travelled to Bucharest to attend the 21st NATO Summit.	
2	United States	New Orleans	April 21–22	Harper travelled to New Orleans to attend the North American Leaders' Summit with President George W. Bush and Mexican President Felipe Calderón.	
3	Japan	Tōyako	July 7–9	Harper travelled to Tōyako to attend the G8 summit.	
4	United States	New York City	September 24	Met with President Bush at the Council of the Americas in New York City.	
5	United States	Washington, D.C.	November 14–15	Harper travelled to Washington, D.C. to attend the G-20 summit.	
6	Peru	Lima	November 22–23	Harper travelled to Lima to attend the APEC summit.	

== 2009 ==
#	Country	Location	Date	Details	Image
1	United Kingdom	London	April 2	Harper travelled to London to attend the G-20 summit.	
2	France	Strasbourg	April 3–4	Harper travelled to Strasbourg and Kehl to attend the 22nd NATO Summit.	
2	Germany	Baden-Baden, Kehl	April 3–4	Harper travelled to Strasbourg and Kehl to attend the 22nd NATO Summit.	
3	Trinidad and Tobago	Port of Spain	April 17–19	Harper travelled to Port of Spain to attend the Summit of the Americas.	
4	France	Juno Beach	June 5–7	Harper travelled to Normandy to attend the 65th anniversary D-Day and the Battle of Normandy.	
5	Italy	L'Aquila	July 8–10	Harper travelled to L'Aquila to attend the G8 summit.	
6	Mexico	Guadalajara	August 9–10	Harper travelled to Guadalajara to attend the North American Leaders' Summit with President Felipe Calderón and U.S. President Barack Obama.	
7	United States	Washington, D.C.	September 16	Harper travelled to Washington, D.C. to meet with President Barack Obama.	
8	United States	Pittsburgh	September 24–25	Harper travelled to Pittsburgh to attend the G-20 summit.	
9	Singapore	Singapore	November 14–15	Harper travelled to Singapore to attend the APEC summit.	
9	India	New Delhi	November 17	Harper travelled to New Delhi to meet with Prime Minister Manmohan Singh.	
10	Trinidad and Tobago	Port of Spain	November 27–29	Harper travelled to Port of Spain to attend the 2009 Commonwealth Heads of Government Meeting.	
11	China	Beijing	December 3	During the visit Chinese Premier Wen Jiabao publicly scolded Harper for not visiting earlier, pointing out that "this is the first meeting between the Chinese premier and a Canadian prime minister in almost five years"; Harper in response said that, "it's almost been five years since we had yourself or President Hu in our country."	
12	South Korea	Seoul	December 7	Harper travelled to Seoul to meet with President Lee Myung-bak.	

== 2010 ==
#	Country	Location	Date	Details	Image
1	United States	Washington, D.C.	April 12–13	Harper travelled to Washington, D.C. to attend the Nuclear Security Summit.	
2	United Kingdom	London	June 3	Harper travelled to London to meet with Prime Minister David Cameron.	
3	South Korea	Seoul	November 11–12	Harper travelled to Seoul to attend the G-20 summit.	
3	Japan	Yokohama	November 13–14	Harper travelled to Yokohama to attend the APEC summit.	
4	Portugal	Lisbon	November 19–20	Harper travelled to Lisbon to attend the 23rd NATO summit.	

== 2011 ==
#	Country	Location	Date	Details	Image
1	United States	Washington, D.C.	February 4	Harper travelled to Washington, D.C. to meet with President Barack Obama.	
2	France	Deauville	May 26–27	Harper travelled to Deauville to attend the G8 summit.	
3	Brazil	Brasília	August 8	Harper travelled to Brasília to meet with President Dilma Rousseff.	
4	Australia	Perth	October 28–30	Harper travelled to Perth to attend the 2011 Commonwealth Heads of Government Meeting.	
5	France	Cannes	November 3–4	Harper travelled to Cannes to attend the G-20 summit.	
6	United States	Honolulu	November 12–13	Harper travelled to Honolulu to attend the APEC Summit.	
7	United States	Washington, D.C.	December 7	Harper travelled to Washington, D.C. to meet with President Barack Obama.	

== 2012 ==
#	Country	Location	Date	Details	Image
1	South Korea	Seoul	March 26–27	Harper travelled to Seoul to attend the Nuclear Security Summit.	
2	United States	Washington, D.C.	April 2	Harper travelled to Washington, D.C. to attend the North American Leaders' Summit with President Barack Obama and Mexican President Felipe Calderón.	
3	Colombia	Cartagena	April 14–15	Harper travelled to Cartagena to attend the Summit of the Americas.	
4	United States	Camp David, Chicago	May 18–21	Harper travelled to the United States to attend the G8 summit and the 24th NATO summit.	
5	Mexico	Cabo San Lucas	June 18–19	Harper travelled to Cabo San Lucas to attend the G-20 summit.	
6	Russia	Vladivostok	September 9–10	Harper travelled to Vladivostok to attend the APEC summit.	
7	India	New Delhi	November 6	Harper travelled to New Delhi to meet with Prime Minister Manmohan Singh.	
8	Philippines	Manila	November 9–12	Official visit	

== 2013 ==
#	Country	Location	Date	Details	Image
1	Ireland	Dublin	June 16–17	Harper, began his two day visit to Ireland yesterday in advance of the G8 summit in Enniskillen. Met with Taoiseach Enda Kenny to discuss trade opportunities.	
1	United Kingdom	Enniskillen	June 17–18	Harper travelled to Enniskillen to attend the G8 summit.	
2	Russia	St. Petersburg	September 5–6	Harper travelled to St. Petersburg to attend the G-20 summit.	
3	Indonesia	Denpasar	October 5–7	Harper travelled to Denpasar to attend the APEC summit.	
4	South Africa	Johannesburg	December 9	Harper attended the national memorial service for Nelson Mandela in Johannesburg. The ceremony brought together world leaders, royals, and representatives of international organizations to pay tribute to Mandela’s legacy of reconciliation, democracy, and human rights. Harper joined other heads of government and state in commemorating Mandela’s life and contributions during South Africa’s official period of mourning.	

== 2014 ==
#	Country	Location	Date	Details	Image
1	Mexico	Mexico City, Toluca	February 18–19	Harper travelled to Toluca to attend the North American Leaders' Summit with President Enrique Peña Nieto and U.S. President Barack Obama.	
2	Ukraine	Kyiv	March 22	Harper travelled to Kyiv to meet with Ukrainian Prime Minister Arsenii Yatseniuk. He became the first G7 leader to visit the epicentre of Ukraine's recent divisive protests.	
3	Netherlands	The Hague	March 24–25	Harper travelled to The Hague to attend the Nuclear Security Summit.	
4	Poland	Warsaw	June 4	Harper travelled to Kyiv to meet with Polish Prime Minister Donald Tusk.	
4	Belgium	Brussels	June 4–5	Harper travelled to Brussels to attend the G7 summit.	
5	France	Normandy	June 5–6	Harper travelled to Juno Beach to attend the 70th anniversary of D-Day and the Battle of Normandy.	
5	Ukraine	Kyiv	June 7	Harper attended the inauguration of Ukrainian President Petro Poroshenko in Kyiv. During the visit, Harper met with Poroshenko to reaffirm Canada’s support for Ukraine amid the ongoing conflict in eastern Ukraine and expressed solidarity with Ukraine’s efforts to defend its sovereignty and pursue closer ties with Europe.	
6	United Kingdom	Newport	September 4–5	Harper travelled to Newport to attend the 25th NATO summit.	
7	China	Beijing	November 10–11	Harper travelled to Beijing to attend the APEC summit.	
8	Australia	Brisbane	November 15–16	Harper travelled to Brisbane to attend the G-20 summit.	

== 2015 ==
#	Country	Location	Date	Details	Image
1	Panama	Panama City	April 10–11	Harper travelled to Panama City to attend the Summit of the Americas.	
2	Ukraine	Kyiv	June 6	Harper travelled to Kyiv, where he met with President Petro Poroshenko and Prime Minister Arseniy Yatsenyuk amid renewed fighting in eastern Ukraine. During the visit, Harper reaffirmed Canada’s support for Ukraine and discussed international efforts to respond to Russian.	
2	Germany	Krün	June 7–8	Harper travelled to Krün to attend the G7 summit.	
2	Poland	Warsaw	June 9	Harper travelled to meet with Prime Minister Ewa Kopacz and President Bronislaw Komorowski, where they discussed and issued a joint statement on the conflict in Ukraine.	

== Multilateral meetings ==
Multilateral meetings of the following intergovernmental organizations took place during Stephen Harper's Premiership (2006–2015).

Group	Year									
Group	2006	2007	2008	2009	2010	2011	2012	2013	2014	2015
UNGA										
APEC	November 18–19, (Vietnam) Hanoi	September 8–9, (Australia) Sydney	November 22–23, (Peru) Lima	November 14–15, Singapore	November 13–14, (Japan) Yokohama	November 12–13, (United States) Honolulu	September 9–10, (Russia) Vladivostok	October 5–7, (Indonesia) Denpasar	November 10–11, (China) Beijing	
G8 / G7	July 15–17, (Russia) St. Petersburg	June 6–8, (Germany) Heiligendamm	July 7–9, (Japan) Tōyako	July 8–10, (Italy) L'Aquila	June 25–26, (Canada) Huntsville	May 26–27, (France) Deauville	May 18–19, (United States) Camp David	June 17–18, (United Kingdom) Enniskillen	June 4–5, (Belgium) Brussels	June 7–8, (Germany) Krün
G20	None	None	November 14–15, (United States) Washington	April 2, (United Kingdom) London	June 26–27, (Canada) Toronto	November 3–4, (France) Cannes	June 18–19, (Mexico) Los Cabos	September 5–6, (Russia) Saint Petersburg	November 15–16, (Australia) Brisbane	
G20	None	None	November 14–15, (United States) Washington	September 24–25, (United States) Pittsburgh	November 11–12, (South Korea) Seoul	November 3–4, (France) Cannes	June 18–19, (Mexico) Los Cabos	September 5–6, (Russia) Saint Petersburg	November 15–16, (Australia) Brisbane	
NATO	November 28–29, (Latvia) Riga	None	April 2–4, (Romania) Bucharest	April 3–4, (France) Strasbourg (Germany) Kehl	November 19–20, (Portugal) Lisbon	None	May 20–21, (United States) Chicago	None	September 4–5, (United Kingdom) Newport	None
SOA (OAS)	None	None	None	April 17–19, (Trinidad and Tobago) Port of Spain	None	None	April 14–15, (Colombia) Cartagena	None	None	April 10–11, Panama City
NALS	March 31, (Mexico) Cancún	August 20–21, (Canada) Montebello	April 21–22, (United States) New Orleans	August 9–10, (Mexico) Guadalajara	None	None	April 2, (United States) Washington	None	February 19, (Mexico) Toluca	None
OIF	September 28–29, (Romania) Bucharest	None	October 17–19, (Canada) Quebec City	None	October 22–24, (Switzerland) Montreux	None	October 12–14, (Democratic Republic of the Congo) Kinshasa	None	October 29–30, (Senegal) Dakar	None
CHOGM	None	November 23–25, (Uganda) Kampala	None	November 27–29, (Trinidad and Tobago) Port of Spain	None	October 28–30, (Australia) Perth	None	November 15–17, (Sri Lanka) Colombo	None	
NSS	None	None	None	None	April 12–13, (United States) Washington	None	March 26–27, (South Korea) Seoul	None	March 24–25, (Netherlands) The Hague	None
Others										
██ = Did not attend

== See also ==
- Foreign policy of the Stephen Harper government
- Foreign relations of Canada
- List of international prime ministerial trips made by Paul Martin, his predecessor
- List of international prime ministerial trips made by Justin Trudeau, his successor
