= Shanghai International Convention Center =

Convention center in Shanghai, China

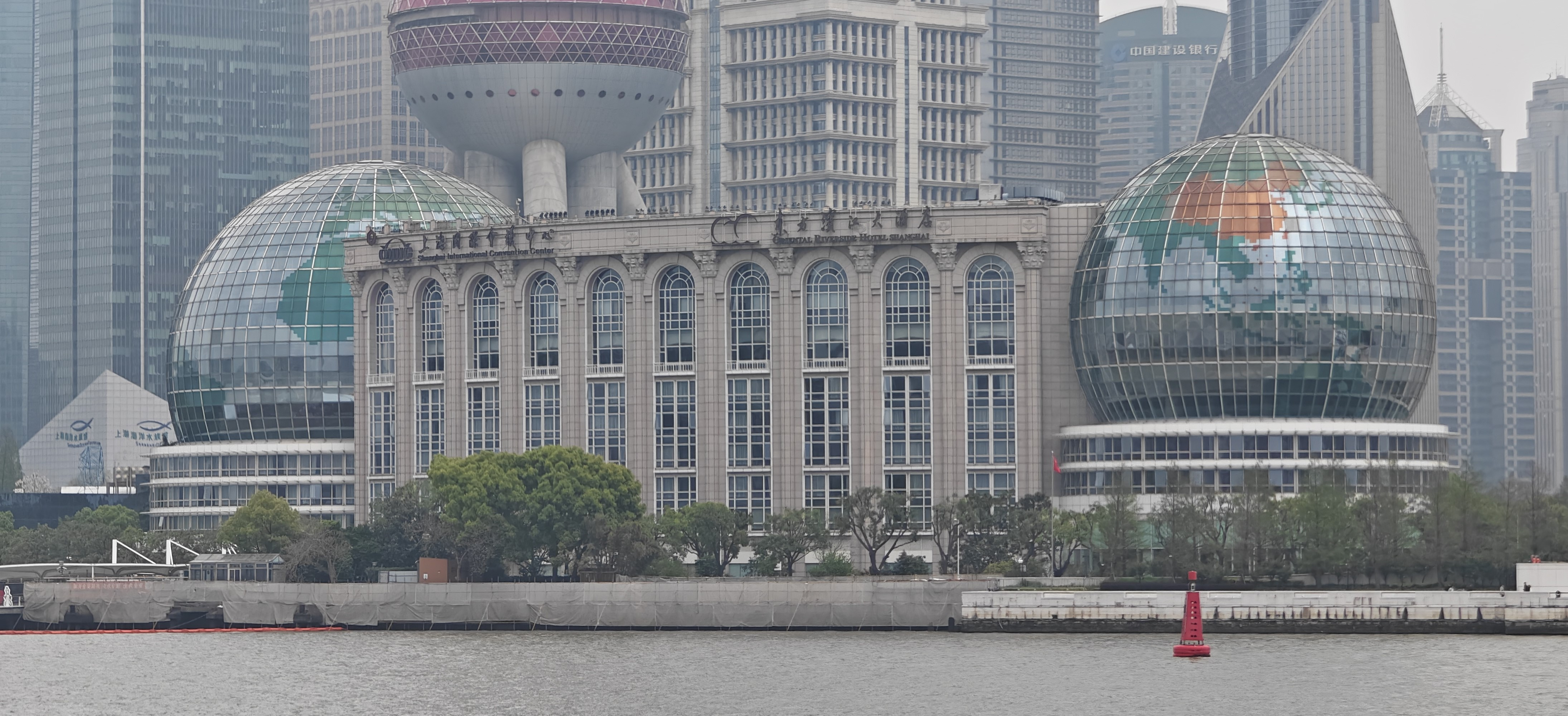
- Shanghai International Convention Center taken from The Bund in 2026
- Interactive map of Shanghai International Convention Center
- Address: 2727 Binjiang Avenue
- Location: Shanghai, China
- Public transit: Lujiazui station : Line 2; 621, 583, 776, 623, 778, 872 and 870

Construction
- Opened: 1999

Website
- www.shiccs.com

Shanghai International Convention Center
- Simplified Chinese: 上海国际会议中心
Transcriptions
Standard Mandarin
- Hanyu Pinyin: Shànghǎi Guójì Huìyì Zhōngxīn

The Shanghai International Convention Center (SHICC, Chinese: 上海国际会议中心) is a convention center in Lujiazui Financial District in Pudong New Area, Shanghai, China, built in 1999. The building is adjacent to Shanghai's skyline of spectacular skyscrapers, including Oriental Pearl Tower, Shanghai Tower and Shanghai World Financial Center. Visitors in the center can have a panorama view of the Bund of Shanghai right across the Huangpu River.

The center consists of a grand banquet hall, a press conference center, 34 multifunctional conference halls and a luxury hotel named Oriental Riverside Hotel Shanghai. It served as the main venue during the 2001 APEC Summit.
