= Pudong Shangri-La =

Hotel in Pudong, Shanghai, China

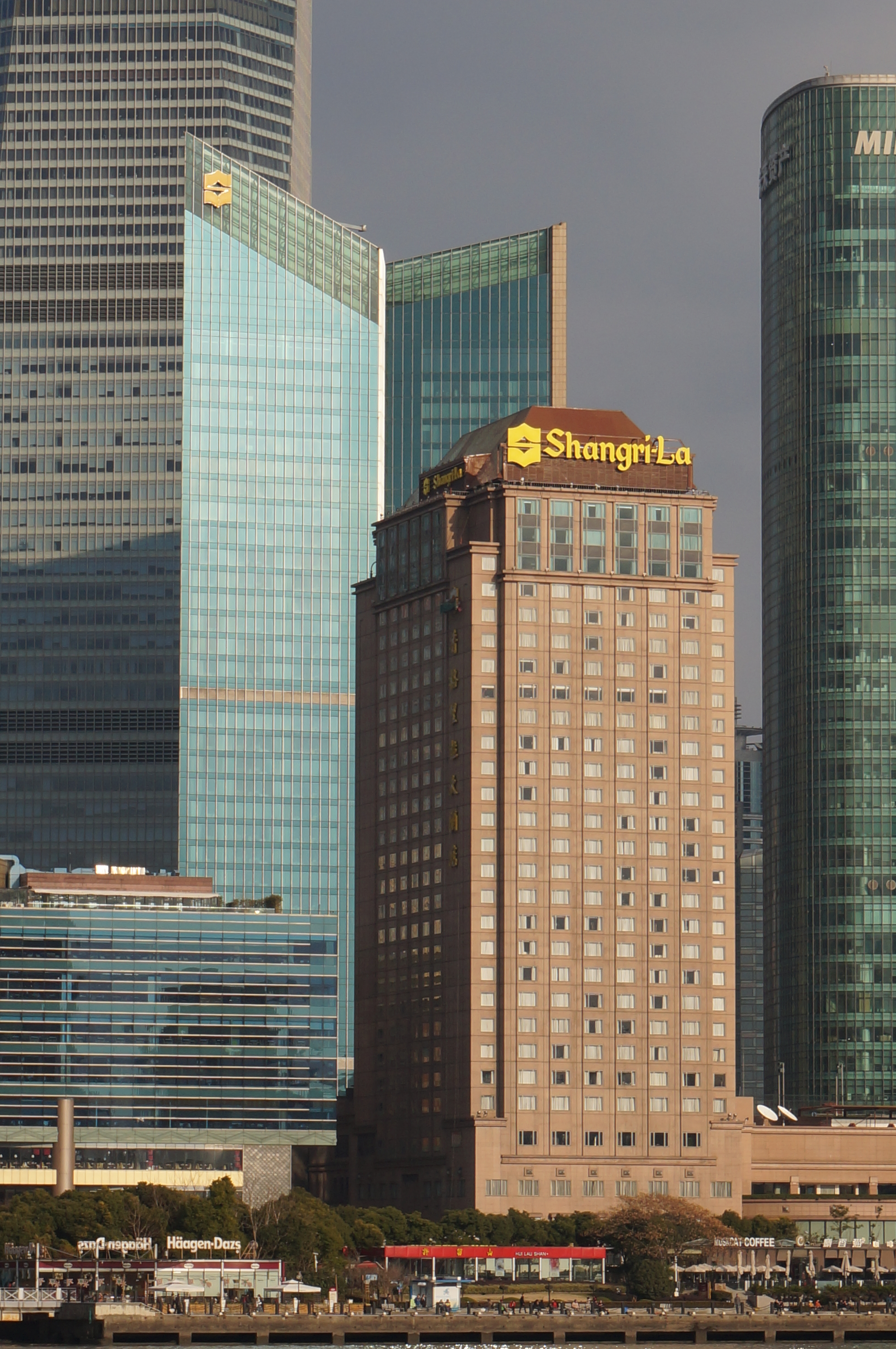

General information
- Type: Hotel
- Location: Shanghai, China

Technical details
- Floor count: 30

Pudong Shangri-La, East Shanghai, often abridged as Pudong Shangri-La, is a hotel located at 33 Fucheng Lu (富城路33号, 近银城东路) in Pudong, Shanghai, China. It is part of the Shangri-La Hotels and Resorts chain.
