= Economic effects of the September 11 attacks =

The September 11 attacks in 2001 were followed by initial shocks causing global stock markets to drop sharply. In international and domestic markets, stocks of companies in some sectors were hit particularly hard. Travel and entertainment stocks fell, while communications, pharmaceutical and military/defense stocks rose. Online travel agencies particularly suffered, as they cater to leisure travel. The attacks themselves resulted in approximately $40 billion in insurance losses, making it one of the largest insured events ever.

== Financial markets ==
Stock exchanges closed between September 10, 2001 and September 17, 2001. After the initial panic, the DJIA quickly rose for only a slight drop.

On Tuesday, September 11, 2001, the opening of the New York Stock Exchange (NYSE) was delayed after the first plane crashed into the World Trade Center's North Tower, and trading for the day was canceled after the second plane crashed into the South Tower. The Nasdaq also canceled trading. The New York Stock Exchange Building was then evacuated as well as nearly all banks and financial institutions on Wall Street and in many cities across the country. The London Stock Exchange and other stock exchanges around the world were also closed down and evacuated in case of follow-up terrorist attacks. The New York Stock Exchange remained closed until the following Monday. This was the third time in history that the NYSE experienced prolonged closure, the first time being in the early months of World War I, and the second being March 1933 during the Great Depression. Trading on the United States bond market also ceased; the leading government bond trader, Cantor Fitzgerald, was based in the World Trade Center. The New York Mercantile Exchange was also closed for a week following the attacks.

The Federal Reserve issued a statement, saying it was "open and operating. The discount window is available to meet liquidity needs." The Federal Reserve added $100 billion in liquidity per day, during the three days following the attack to help avert a financial crisis. Federal Reserve Governor Roger W. Ferguson Jr. has described in detail this and the other actions that the Fed undertook to maintain a stable economy and offset potential disruptions arising in the financial system.

Gold prices spiked upwards, from $215.50 to $287 an ounce in London trading. Oil prices also spiked upwards. Gas prices in the United States also briefly shot up, though the spike in prices lasted only about one week. Currency trading continued, with the United States dollar falling sharply against the Euro, British pound, and Japanese yen. The next day, European stock markets fell sharply, including declines of 4.6% in Spain, 8.5% in Germany, and 5.7% on the London Stock Exchange. Stocks in the Latin American markets also plunged, with a 9.2% drop in Brazil, 5.2% drop in Argentina, and 5.6% decline in Mexico, before trading was halted.

== Economic sectors ==
=== Insurance ===
Insurance losses due to 9/11 were more than one and a half times greater than what was previously the largest disaster (Hurricane Andrew) in terms of losses. The losses included business interruption ($11.0 billion), property ($9.6 billion), liability ($7.5 billion), workers compensation ($1.8 billion), and others ($2.5 billion). The firms with the largest losses included Berkshire Hathaway, Lloyd's, Swiss Re, and Munich Re, all of which are reinsurers, with more than $2 billion in losses for each. Shares of major reinsurers, including Swiss Re and the Bâloise insurance group dropped by more than 10%, while shares of Swiss Life dropped 7.8%.

=== Airlines and aviation ===
Flights were grounded in various places across the United States and Canada that did not necessarily have operational support in place, such as dedicated ground crews. A large number of transatlantic flights landed in Gander, Newfoundland, and in Halifax, Nova Scotia, with the logistics handled by Transport Canada in Operation Yellow Ribbon. To help with the immediate needs of victims' families, United Airlines and American Airlines both provided initial payments of $25,000. The airlines were also required to refund ticket purchases for anyone unable to fly.

The 9/11 attacks compounded existing financial troubles in the airline industry. Share prices for airlines and airplane manufacturers plummeted in the aftermath. Midway Airlines, already on the verge of bankruptcy, ceased operations almost immediately. Swissair, unable to meet its debt obligations, was grounded on October 2, 2001, and subsequently liquidated. Other airlines faced the threat of bankruptcy, leading to tens of thousands of layoffs in the week following the attacks. To help stabilize the industry, the federal government introduced a financial assistance package that included $10 billion in loan guarantees and $5 billion for short-term assistance.

In the years that followed, these financial pressures accelerated a wave of consolidation among major U.S. airlines. Carriers pursued mergers as a strategy to reduce costs, increase efficiency, and maintain competitiveness in an increasingly volatile market. A series of high-profile mergers reshaped the industry: America West acquired US Airways in 2005, a transaction that ultimately led to the combined airline’s merger with American Airlines in 2013. Similarly, Delta merged with Northwest in 2008, and United combined with Continental in 2010. Although the 9/11 attacks served as a catalyst for these consolidations, the trend was also driven by preexisting structural issues within the deregulated airline industry, including high fixed costs, overcapacity, and intense competition.

The reduction in air travel demand caused by the attack is seen as a contributory reason for the retirement of Concorde, the only remaining supersonic airliner still in service at the time.

=== Tourism ===
Tourism in New York City plummeted, causing massive losses in a sector that employed 280,000 people and generated $25 billion per year. In the week following the attack, hotel occupancy fell below 40%, and 3,000 employees were laid off. The reluctance to fly may have been due to increased fear of a repeat attack. Suzanne Thompson, Professor of Psychology at Pomona College, conducted interviews of 501 people who were not direct victims of 9/11. From this, she concluded that "Most participants felt more distress (65 percent) and a stronger fear of flying (55 percent) immediately after the event than they did before the attacks."

=== Security ===
Since the 9/11 attacks, substantial resources have been put towards improving security, in the areas of homeland security, national defense, and in the private sector. In fact, the United States began increasing its budget to fight terrorism and secure the country after the September 11 attacks. According to the Congressional Research Service, the federal government had an increase of about $2 trillion in budgets. A budget that some analysts believe did not even include a plan for how it would be spent.

== New York City ==
In New York City, approximately 430,000 jobs were lost and there were $2.8 billion in lost wages over the three months following the 9/11 attacks. The economic effects were mainly focused on the city's export economy sectors. The GDP for New York City was estimated to have declined by $30.3 billion over the last three months of 2001 and all of 2002. The Federal government provided $11.2 billion in immediate assistance to the Government of New York City in September 2001, and $10.5 billion in early 2002 for economic development and infrastructure needs.

The 9/11 attacks had great impact on small businesses in Lower Manhattan, located near the World Trade Center. Approximately 18,000 small businesses were destroyed or displaced after the attacks. The Small Business Administration provided loans as assistance, while Community Development Block Grants and Economic Injury Disaster Loans were used by the Federal Government to provide assistance to small businesses affected by the 9/11 attacks.

== Other effects ==
The September 11 attacks led directly to the U.S. war in Afghanistan, as well as additional homeland security spending. The attacks were also cited as a rationale for the Iraq War. In 2008, Joseph Stiglitz estimated that the cost of the two wars would surpass $6 trillion.
