= APAC =

APAC or Apac may refer to:

== Places ==
- Apac, a city in Uganda
  - Apac District, the district of Uganda in which the city is located
- Asia-Pacific, a country grouping and region in Asia and Oceania

== Arts, entertainment, and media ==
- A-PAC, Australian Public Affairs Channel, a pay television news service
- Asia, Pacific and Africa Collections, British Library, a documents collection of the British Library in London, England

== Enterprises and organizations ==
- Adult Performer Advocacy Committee, an American organized labor group for pornographic actors
- Air Products (also known as Air Products and Chemicals), an American corporation
- Atlas Performing Arts Center, an arts center in Washington, DC, United States
- Australia Pacific Airports Corporation, an Australian airports operator
- Australian Partnership for Advanced Computing, a computer science organisation
- Australian Psychology Accreditation Council, a psychology accreditation organisation
- Australian Performing Arts Collection, an Australian arts archive

== Events ==
- Asia Pacific Activities Conference, an international schools event
- Asia-Pacific Amateur Championship, a golf tournament
- Audio Publishers Association Conference, an annual audiobook publisher/narrator event

== See also ==
- American Israel Public Affairs Committee (AIPAC), a political lobby
- Asia-Pacific Economic Cooperation (APEC), an intergovernmental forum
