= United Nations Security Council Resolution 1368 =

UN Security Council Resolution 1368
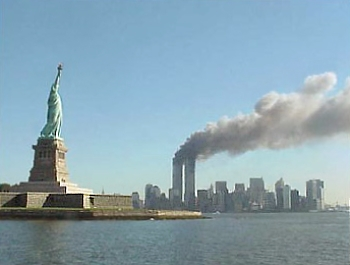
- World Trade Center on fire in New York City
- Date: 12 September 2001
- Meeting no.: 4,370
- Code: S/RES/1368 (Document)
- Subject: Threats to international peace and security caused by terrorist acts
- Voting summary: 15 voted for; None voted against; None abstained
- Result: Adopted

Security Council composition
- Permanent members: China; France; Russia; United Kingdom; United States
- Non-permanent members: Bangladesh; Colombia; Ireland; Jamaica; Mali; Mauritius; Norway; Singapore; Tunisia; Ukraine

United Nations Security Council resolution 1368, adopted unanimously on 12 September 2001, after expressing its determination to combat threats to international peace and security caused by acts of terrorism and recognising the right of individual and collective self-defense, the Council condemned the September 11 attacks in the United States.

The Security Council strongly condemned the attacks in New York City, Washington, D.C., and Pennsylvania and regarded the incidents as a threat to international peace and security. It expressed sympathy and condolences to the victims and their families and the United States government.

It was proposed by the French ambassador to the UN Jean-David Levitte.

The resolution called on all countries to co-operate in bringing the perpetrators, organisers and sponsors of the attacks to justice and that those responsible for supporting or harbouring the perpetrators, organisers and sponsors would be held accountable. The international community was called upon to increase efforts to suppress and prevent terrorist activities through co-operation and implementation of anti-terrorist conventions and Security Council resolutions, particularly Resolution 1269 (1999).

Resolution 1368 concluded with the Council expressing its readiness to take steps to respond to the attacks and combat all forms of terrorism in accordance with the United Nations Charter.

== See also ==
- United Nations Security Council Resolution 1373
- United Nations Security Council Resolution 1377
- Aftermath of the September 11 attacks
- List of United Nations Security Council Resolutions 1301 to 1400 (2000–2002)
- Reactions to the September 11 attacks
