= United Nations Security Council Resolution 1383 =

UN Security Council Resolution 1383
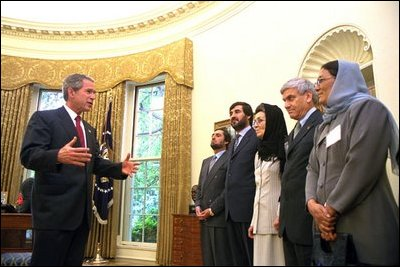
- Former U.S. President George W. Bush meeting Afghan ministers
- Date: 6 December 2001
- Meeting no.: 4,434
- Code: S/RES/1383 (Document)
- Subject: The situation in Afghanistan
- Voting summary: 15 voted for; None voted against; None abstained
- Result: Adopted

Security Council composition
- Permanent members: China; France; Russia; United Kingdom; United States
- Non-permanent members: Bangladesh; Colombia; Ireland; Jamaica; Mali; Mauritius; Norway; Singapore; Tunisia; Ukraine

United Nations Security Council resolution 1383, adopted unanimously on 6 December 2001, after reaffirming all resolutions on the situation in Afghanistan, particularly Resolution 1378 (2001), the Council endorsed the Bonn Agreement signed the previous day concerning the transition period in the country following the U.S. invasion and preceding the establishment of permanent institutions.

In the preamble of the resolution, the Council stressed the right of the Afghan people to determine their own political future and was determined to help the Afghan people bring an end to the conflicts in the country and the use of its territory as a base for terrorism, and promote peace, stability and respect for human rights. It noted that the provisional arrangements within the Bonn Agreement were the basis for the establishment of a representative government in terms of gender and ethnicity.

Endorsing the Bonn Agreement, the resolution called upon all Afghan groups to fully implement the agreement with co-operation from the Afghan Interim Authority that was to take office on 22 December 2001. The Council declared its willingness to take further measures to support the interim institutions based on a report by the Secretary-General Kofi Annan. The Afghan parties were called upon to grant unimpeded access to humanitarian organisations.

Finally, all donors, through co-operation with the Special Representative Lakhdar Brahimi and United Nations bodies, were asked to assist in the rehabilitation, recovery and reconstruction of Afghanistan.

== See also ==
- War in Afghanistan (1978–present)
- List of United Nations Security Council Resolutions 1301 to 1400 (2000–2002)
- United Nations Assistance Mission in Afghanistan
- War in Afghanistan (2001–2021)
