= APEC Youth Science Festival =

- Genre: Science fair
- Most recent: 4th APEC Youth Science Festival: From Nature to Technology
- Organiser: APEC

APEC Youth Science Festival is a science fair run by the Asia-Pacific Economic Cooperation (APEC). It is for 15–18-year-olds with an interest in science–technology, and seeks to break down cultural barriers for learning. It began in 1998 in Seoul. The president of the Republic of Korea proposed to host the APEC Youth Science Festival at the 2nd APEC Science and Technology Ministers' Conference on November 13, 1996.

== List of festivals ==
Year	Place	Name
1998	Seoul, South Korea	Postcards from Seoul
2000	Singapore	Seven days in Singapore
2004	Beijing, China	Science, Youth and Future
2011	Pathum Thani, Thailand	From Nature to Technology
