= United Nations Security Council Resolution 1269 =

UN Security Council Resolution 1269
- Date: 19 October 1999
- Meeting no.: 4,053
- Code: S/RES/1269 (Document)
- Subject: The responsibility of the Security Council in the maintenance of international peace and security
- Voting summary: 15 voted for; None voted against; None abstained
- Result: Adopted

Security Council composition
- Permanent members: China; France; Russia; United Kingdom; United States
- Non-permanent members: Argentina; Bahrain; Brazil; Canada; Gabon; Gambia; Malaysia; Namibia; Netherlands; Slovenia

United Nations Security Council resolution 1269, adopted unanimously on 19 October 1999, after expressing concern at the increasing number of acts of international terrorism, the Council condemned terrorist attacks and called upon states to fully implement anti-terrorist conventions. It was the first time the Security Council had addressed terrorism in a general manner, though it did not define what constituted terrorism.

== Resolution ==
=== Observations ===
The Security Council was mindful of resolutions passed by the General Assembly including Resolution 49/60 (1994) concerning measures to eliminate international terrorism. There was a necessity to intensify the fight against terrorism at the national level and strengthen international co-operation with respect for international humanitarian and human rights law. To this end it supported efforts to promote worldwide participation in and implementation of existing anti-terrorist conventions and the development of new anti-terrorist instruments.

=== Acts ===
Acting under Chapter VI of the United Nations Charter, the resolution unequivocally condemned all acts of worldwide terrorism as criminal and unjustifiable regardless of the circumstances in which the acts were committed. All countries were called upon to implement international anti-terrorist conventions to which they were party to; states that had not adopted such measures were urged to do so immediately. The Council stressed that the United Nations played a vital role in strengthening international co-operation in the fight against terrorism.

All countries were urged to take the following steps:

(a) co-operate with each other through mutual agreements to prevent terrorist acts and prosecute perpetrators;
(b) prevent and suppress the preparation and financing of terrorist acts through all possible legal means;
(c) deny safe havens for those who commit terrorist acts through prosecution and extradition;
(d) ensure that asylum seekers are not terrorists before granting them refugee status through appropriate measures;
(e) participate in information exchanges and judicial co-operation to prevent terrorist acts.

The Secretary-General Kofi Annan was asked to pay close attention to the need to prevent threats to international security as a result of terrorist acts. Finally, the Council expressed its readiness to take further measures in order to counter terrorist threats.

== See also ==
- Counterterrorism
- List of terrorist incidents
- List of United Nations Security Council Resolutions 1201 to 1300 (1998–2000)
