= APEC Thailand 2003 =

APEC Thailand 2003 การประชุมเอเปค พ.ศ. 2546 ประเทศไทย

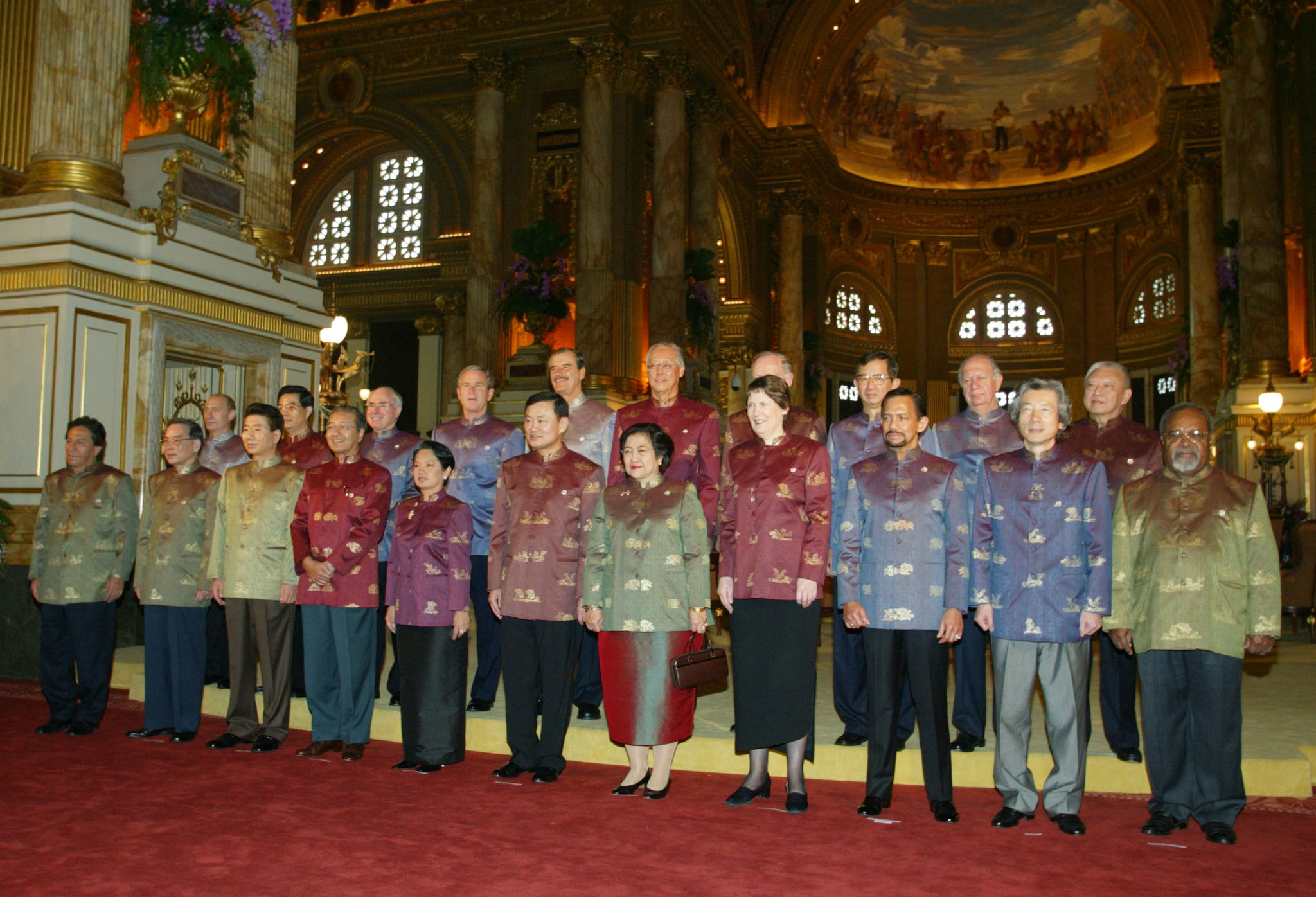
- APEC Thailand 2003 delegates
- Host country: Thailand
- Date: 20–21 October
- Motto: A World of Differences: Partnership for the Future. (Thai: โลกแห่งความแตกต่าง: หุ้นส่วนเพื่ออนาคต)
- Venues: Bangkok
- Follows: APEC Mexico 2002
- Precedes: APEC Chile 2004
- Website: apec2003.org (archived)

APEC Thailand 2003 was a series of political meetings held around Thailand between the 21 member economies of the Asia-Pacific Economic Cooperation during 2003. Various meetings were held across Thailand to discuss present economic conditions and future global policies. Leaders from all the member countries met from 20–21 October 2003 in Bangkok. President George W. Bush will attend leaders' meetings and will visit Indonesia, Japan, the Philippines, Singapore and Australia. The presentation defines the major issues that may arise during the APEC meeting and President Bush's visit to East Asia.

== Theme ==
The theme of APEC in 2003 is "Different worlds: Partnership for the Future", which aims to bring together the greatest potential of all APEC economies to meet future challenges, in particular the free and open trade of APEC and investment in the developed APEC economies. This central theme is magnified by a series of five sub-themes designed to guide APEC working groups and forums in achieving their objectives.

== Logo ==
The summit's logo was an image of “Sri Suphanahongsa” Royal Barge, a vessel used by the Thai monarch which symbolizes Thailand’s national heritage and culture and the strong bonds of historic, economic, social and cultural relations of APEC member economies. The revolving globe behind the royal barge signifies APEC's values, namely dynamism, interconnection, global economic cooperation and regionalism.

== See also ==
APEC summits hosted by Thailand

- APEC Thailand 1992
- APEC Thailand 2022

Preceded by APEC Mexico 2002	APEC meetings 2003	Succeeded by APEC Chile 2004
