= APEC Mexico 2002 =

Political and economic summit

- Host country: Mexico
- Date: 26–27 October
- Venues: Los Cabos
- Follows: APEC China 2001
- Precedes: APEC Thailand 2003
- Website: apex2002.org.mx (archived)

APEC Mexico 2002 was a series of political meetings held around Mexico between the 21 member economies of the Asia-Pacific Economic Cooperation during 2002. Leaders from all member countries met from 26–27 October 2002 in Los Cabos. Counter-terrorism efforts were major topics on the agenda of APEC Mexico 2002. The APEC summit attempted to present a new opportunity for Asian investors and commercial agents to discover Mexico as a profitable frontier in the future.

== Attending country representatives ==
- Australia: Prime Minister John Howard
- Brunei Darussalam: Sultan Hassanal Bolkiah
- Canada: Prime Minister Jean Chretien
- Chile: President Ricardo Lagos
- China: President Jiang Zemin
- Hong Kong: Chief Executive Tung Chee-hwa
- Indonesia: President Megawati Soekarnoputri
- Japan: Prime Minister Junichiro Koizumi
- Malaysia: Deputy Prime Minister Abdullah Ahmad Badawi
- Mexico: President Vicente Fox
- New Zealand: Prime Minister Helen Clark
- Papua New Guinea: Prime Minister Michael Somare
- Peru: President Alejandro Toledo
- Philippines: President Gloria Macapagal Arroyo
- Russia: Prime Minister Mikhail Kasyanov
- Singapore: Minister of Trade and Industry George Yeo
- South Korea: President Kim Dae Jung
- (Taiwan) Chinese Taipei: Presidential Envoy Yuan-Tseh Lee
- Thailand: Prime Minister Thaksin Shinawatra
- United States: President George W. Bush
- Vietnam: Prime Minister Phan Van Khai

== Priorities ==
The three priorities of the APEC summit were:

1. Implementation of policies on trade, investment and finance to promote economic growth and extract gains from the New Economy;

2. Capacity building to obtain benefits from development through the promotion of micro, small and medium sized enterprises;

3. Strengthening APEC's international relevance by encouraging greater participation of youth and women, intensifying efforts to promote the benefits of globalization and improving the functioning of APEC.

Preceded by APEC China 2001	APEC meetings 2002	Succeeded by APEC Thailand 2003
