= APEC Chile 2004 =

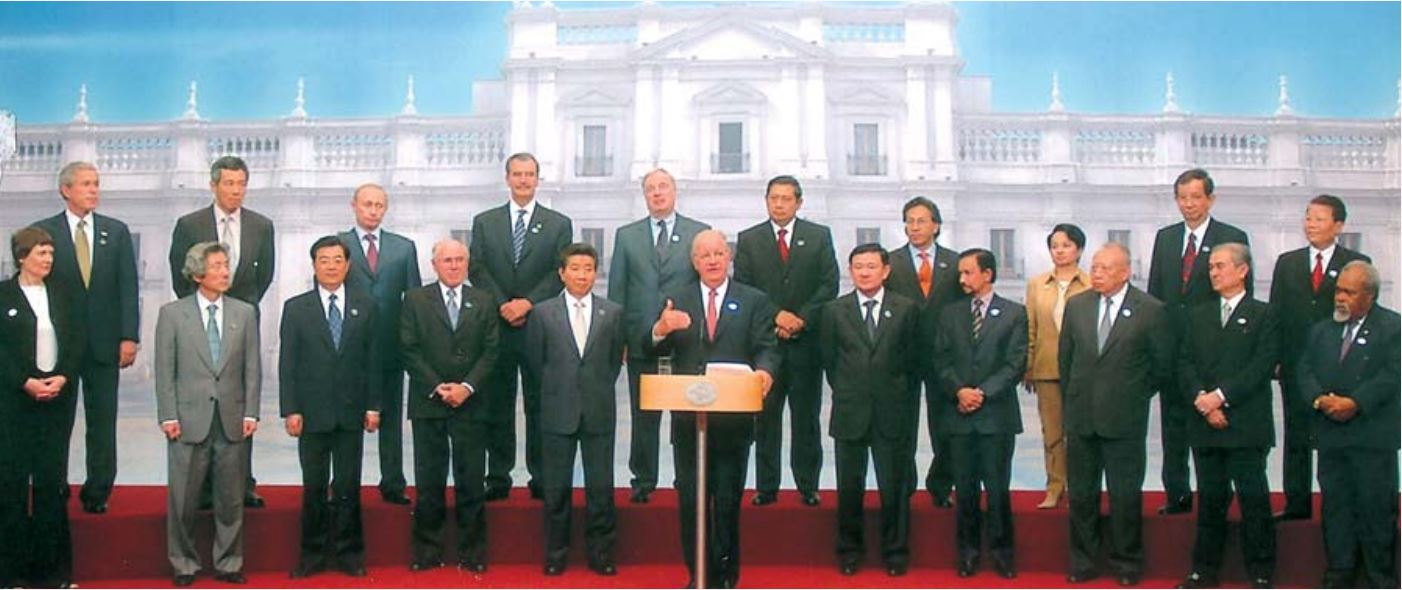
- APEC Chile 2004 delegates
- Host country: Chile
- Dates: 20–21 November
- Motto: One Community, Our Future. (Spanish: Una Comunidad, Nuestro Futuro)
- Venues: Santiago
- Follows: APEC Thailand 2003
- Precedes: APEC South Korea 2005
- Website: apec2004.cl (archived)

APEC Chile 2004 was a series of political meetings held around Chile between the 21 member economies of the Asia-Pacific Economic Cooperation during 2004. Leaders from all the member countries met from 20 to 21 November 2004 in Santiago on the topic that Chile established was "One Community, Our Future".

Ambassador Artaza claimed the Chile 2004 APEC would significantly portray the importance of social activities during the process of APEC's free trade and investment goals.

== Protest ==
Reports mentioned that there were about 700 people detained and 20 policemen injured in Chile three days before the APEC forum.

Many protesters were angry at the presence of United States President George W Bush.

The parade itself was peaceful.

== Attending country representatives ==
- Australia: Prime Minister John Howard
- Brunei: Sultan Hassanal Bolkiah
- Canada: Prime Minister Paul Martin
- Chile: President Ricardo Lagos
- China: President Hu Jintao
- Taiwan: President Chen Shui-bian
- South Korea: President Roh Moo-hyun
- USA: President George W. Bush
- Philippines: President Gloria Macapagal Arroyo
- Hong Kong: Chief Executive Tung Chee-hwa
- Indonesia: President Susilo Bambang Yudhoyono
- Japan: Prime Minister Junichiro Koizumi
- Malaysia: Prime Minister Abdullah Ahmad Badawi
- Mexico: President Vicente Fox
- New Zealand: Prime Minister Helen Clark
- Papua New Guinea: Prime Minister Michael Somare
- Peru: President Alejandro Toledo
- Russia: President Vladimir Putin
- Singapore: Prime Minister Lee Hsien Loong
- Thailand: Prime Minister Thaksin Shinawatra
- Vietnam: President Trần Đức Lương

Preceded by APEC Thailand 2003	APEC meetings 2004	Succeeded by APEC South Korea 2005
