= United Nations Security Council Resolution 1378 =

UN Security Council Resolution 1378
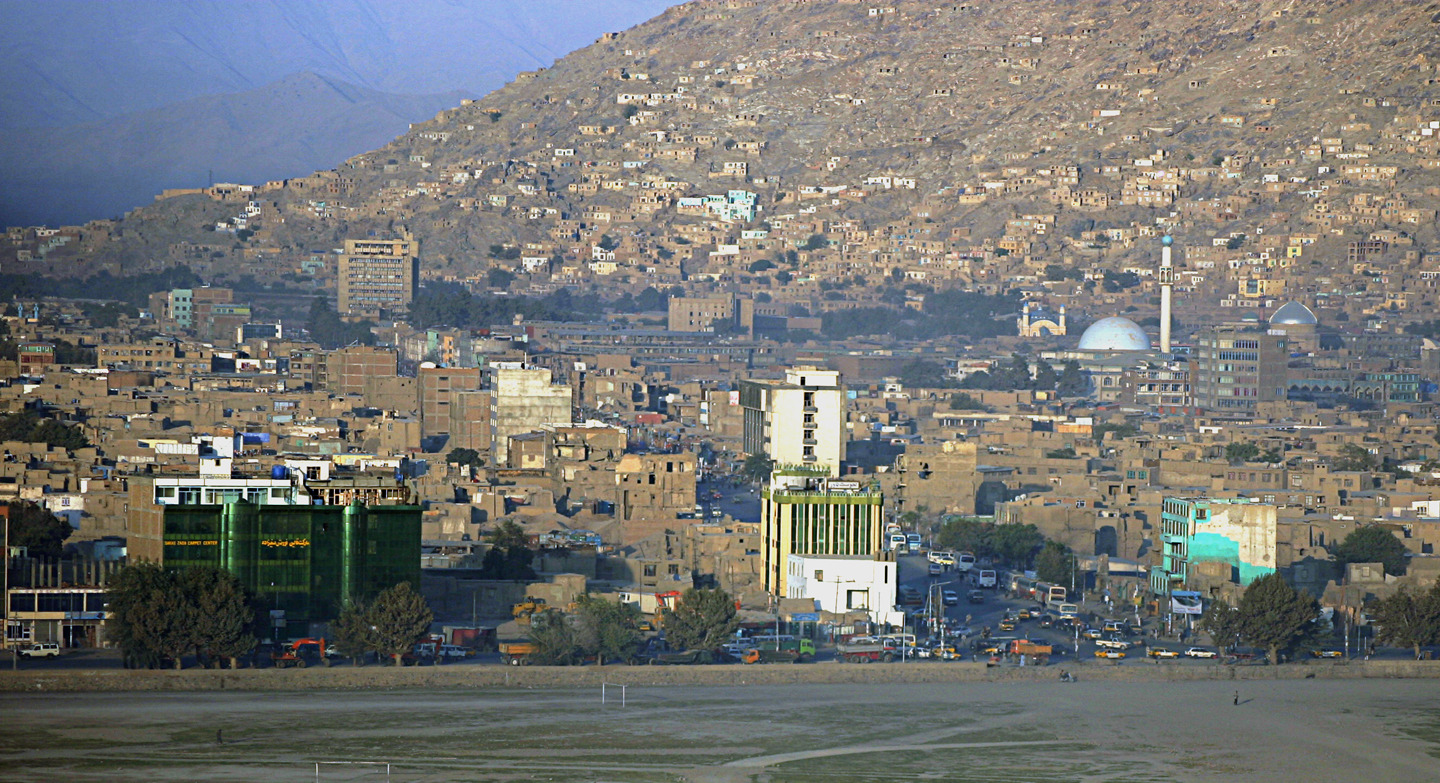
- Afghan capital Kabul
- Date: 14 November 2001
- Meeting no.: 4,415
- Code: S/RES/1378 (Document)
- Subject: The situation in Afghanistan
- Voting summary: 15 voted for; None voted against; None abstained
- Result: Adopted

Security Council composition
- Permanent members: China; France; Russia; United Kingdom; United States
- Non-permanent members: Bangladesh; Colombia; Ireland; Jamaica; Mali; Mauritius; Norway; Singapore; Tunisia; Ukraine

United Nations Security Council resolution 1378, adopted unanimously on 14 November 2001, after reaffirming all resolutions on the situation in Afghanistan, including resolutions 1267 (1999), 1333 (2000) and 1363 (2001), the Council affirmed that the United Nations would play an important role in the country and called for the establishment of a transitional administration leading to the formation of a new government.

The Security Council recognised the urgency of the situation in Afghanistan, particularly in Kabul, and supported efforts to combat terrorism according to resolutions 1368 (2001) and 1373 (2001). It condemned the Taliban for allowing Afghanistan to be used as a base and safe haven for Al-Qaeda, other groups and Osama bin Laden and violations of international law. The preamble of the resolution welcomed the declaration by the Six plus Two group and the intention of convening a meeting involving all Afghan processes.

The resolution supported the efforts of the Afghan people to establish a new and transitional administration leading to the formation of a government that would be fully representative, respect human rights and its international obligations and facilitate the delivery of humanitarian assistance. It called on the Afghan forces to refrain from reprisals and respect human rights and international humanitarian law.

The Council affirmed a central role for the United Nations in Afghanistan to establish the transitional administration. It called on Member States to provide support towards the establishment of the transitional administration and government, humanitarian assistance and long-term assistance with regard to social and economic reconstruction and the rehabilitation of the country. Finally, Member States were urged to ensure the security of areas of Afghanistan no longer under Taliban control, particularly Kabul, and protect civilians, transitional authorities and all international personnel.

== See also ==
- War in Afghanistan (1978–present)
- List of United Nations Security Council Resolutions 1301 to 1400 (2000–2002)
- United Nations Special Mission to Afghanistan
- War in Afghanistan (2001–2021)
