= 1965 in aviation =

This is a list of aviation-related events from 1965.

== Events ==
- In the Mediterranean, the United States Navy Sixth Fleet general stores issue ship USS Altair (AKS-32) conducts what is probably the first night vertical replenishment (VERTREP) of an aircraft carrier, using the Sikorsky SH-3A Sea King antisubmarine helicopter.

=== January ===
- January 1 – Trans-Canada Airlines is renamed Air Canada.
- January 2 – Denis Healey, the United Kingdom's Secretary of Defence, cancels the nation's fighter and military transport programmes and orders the purchase of the US-built F-4 Phantom II and C-130 Hercules in their place.
- January 26 – President Humberto de Alencar Castelo Branco of Brazil decides that the Brazilian Air Force henceforth will control all Brazilian fixed-wing military aircraft, including those aboard the aircraft carrier Minas Gerais, and that the Brazilian Navy will control all seagoing rotary-wing aircraft. Key Brazilian naval personnel resign in protest.

=== February ===
- The United States Navy begins its last flying boat operations, employing P-5 Marlins of Patrol Squadron 40 (VP-40) in Operation Market Time. Operating from seaplane tenders, the P-5s conduct maritime surveillance patrols off the Mekong Delta between Phú Quốc and Vung Tau, South Vietnam, to locate small craft transporting supplies from North Vietnam to Viet Cong units in South Vietnam.
- February 7 – 49 U.S. Navy bombers from aircraft carriers in the Gulf of Tonkin begin Operation Flaming Dart, striking enemy barracks and facilities at Đồng Hới, North Vietnam.
- February 8
  - Republic of Vietnam Air Force aircraft led by Republic of Vietnam Air Force Commander Air Vice Marshal Nguyen Cao Ky strike an enemy barracks at Vinh, North Vietnam, during Operation Flaming Dart.
  - Making an unusually steep bank a few minutes after takeoff from John F. Kennedy International Airport to avoid colliding with a Pan American World Airways Boeing 707, a Douglas DC-7B operating as Eastern Airlines Flight 663 crashes into the Atlantic Ocean 6.7 miles (10.8 km) south-southwest of Jones Beach State Park on Long Island, New York. All 84 people on board die.
- February 11 – Operation Flaming Dart II begins as 99 U.S. Navy carrier aircraft attack enemy logistics and communications at Chanh Hoa barracks in southern North Vietnam near the DMZ.
- February 13 – President Lyndon B. Johnson authorizes Operation Rolling Thunder, a campaign of air strikes against North Vietnam.
- February 15 – G. Meher sets out on a journey from Culver City, California, to become the first woman to cross the United States by helicopter.
- February 19
  - U.S. Air Force B-57 Canberra bombers become the first American aircraft to provide direct support to South Vietnamese Army ground units in combat.
  - Lufthansa signs up as the first customer for the forthcoming Boeing 737.
- February 24 – U.S. Air Force aircraft fly a massive number of tactical air sorties to break up a Communist ambush of South Vietnamese ground forces in Vietnam's Central Highlands.

=== March ===
- March 1 – The combat debut of the Republic F-105 Thunderchief takes place, as U.S. Air Force F-105D aircraft based at Da Nang Air Base, South Vietnam, begin bombing missions over North Vietnam.
- March 2 – Operation Rolling Thunder, a massive American air campaign against North Vietnam, begins.
- March 3 – The United States begins Operation Blue Tree, medium-altitude photographic reconnaissance and bomb damage assessment flights over North Vietnam.
- March 6 – A United States Navy Sikorsky SH-3A Sea King piloted by Commander James R. Milliford makes the first non-stop helicopter flight across North America, launching from the antisubmarine aircraft carrier USS Hornet (CVS-12) at San Diego, California, and landing aboard the attack aircraft carrier USS Franklin D. Roosevelt (CVA-42) in the Atlantic Ocean off Jacksonville, Florida. The distance travelled is 2,116 miles (3,405 kilometres), a new straight-line distance record for helicopters.
- March 8 – Aeroflot Flight 513, a Tupolev Tu-124V (registration CCCP-45028), stalls at an altitude of 40 to 50 meters (131 to 164 ft) immediately after takeoff from Kuibyshev Airport in Kuibyshev in the Soviet Union and crashes in a snow-covered field, killing 30 of the 39 people on board.
- March 16 – Flying a MiG Ye-155, Soviet test pilot Alexander V. Fedotov achieves an average speed of 2,319.12 km/h (1,441.03 mph) over a 1,000 km (620 mi) circuit. The flight sets new world speed records for the distance with a 2,000 kg (4,400 lb) payload, a 1,000 kg (2,200 lb) payload, and no payload.
- March 31 – U.S. Marine Corps UH-34 transport helicopters escorted by U.S. Army UH-1B helicopter gunships come under heavy Viet Cong ground fire while attempting to drop off 435 South Vietnamese troops in a landing zone 25 miles (40 km) south of Da Nang, South Vietnam. Thirty-five helicopters become involved; three are shot down and 19 damaged.

=== April ===
- April 1 – Tasman Empire Airways becomes Air New Zealand.
- April 3
  - United States Air Force and U.S. Navy aircraft begin covert Operation Steel Tiger armed reconnaissance flights over southeastern Laos.
  - The first jet-to-jet combat of the Vietnam War occurs. Although all American aircraft involved return safely, the North Vietnamese Air Force claims to have shot down a U.S. Navy F-8 Crusader fighter and in future years celebrates April 3 as "North Vietnamese Air Force Day."
  - The U.S. Air Force mounts the first and largest U.S. air strike against the Thanh Hóa Railroad and Highway Bridge in North Vietnam, which the bridge survives. Despite 873 sorties against it over the next seven years, the bridge will not be destroyed until April 1972.
- April 4 – During a U.S. Air Force strike on the Thanh Hóa Bridge, North Vietnamese Air Force MiG-17 fighters attack a formation of U.S. Air Force F-105 Thunderchief strike aircraft, shooting down two F-105s. They are the first aircraft lost in air-to-air combat by either side during the Vietnam War.
- April 5 – A U.S. Navy RF-8 Crusader reconnaissance aircraft photographs an SA-2 Guideline surface-to-air missile (SAM) site under construction in North Vietnam for the first time, but President Lyndon B. Johnson's administration does not authorize strikes against North Vietnamese SAM sites until late July. To meet the threat the SA-2s pose, during April the U.S. Air Force adds radar homing and warning equipment to its Lockheed U-2 reconnaissance aircraft and deploys EB-66B Destroyer electronic countermeasures aircraft to Southeast Asia.
- April 5 – The BAC One-Eleven receives its airworthiness certificate.
- April 6
  - The United Kingdom cancels the BAC TSR.2 in favour of procuring the General Dynamics F-111 Aardvark for the Royal Air Force. In the end, the RAF does not buy the F-111, either.
  - United Air Lines places orders for new aircraft worth $US 750 million, the largest airliner purchase in history at the time.
- April 9 – U.S. Navy F-4 Phantom IIs of Fighter Squadron 96 (VF-96) clash with Chinese MiG-17 fighters over the South China Sea south of Hainan. One F-4B is shot down, but VF-96 claims one MiG-17 destroyed.
- April 10 – The U.S. Joint Chiefs of Staff submit a plan for Operation Rolling Thunder which includes a list of major fixed targets in North Vietnam in its section Alpha. It begins the U.S. Navy use of the term "Alpha strike", meaning a large attack by an aircraft carrier air wing.
- April 14 – After aborting its first landing attempt at Jersey Airport on Jersey in the Channel Islands due to low cloud cover, British United Airways Flight 1030X, a Douglas C-47B operated by the British United Airways affiliate British United (C.I.) Airways, strikes the outermost pole of the approach lighting system with its right wing on its second landing attempt. The wing breaks off and the aircraft rolls upside down and crashes, killing 26 of the 27 people on board; one flight attendant survives.
- April 15 – U.S. Navy carrier aircraft strike Viet Cong positions at Black Virgin Mountain in South Vietnam.
- April 23 – The first production C-141A Starlifter cargo aircraft is delivered to the U.S. Air Force's Military Airlift Command.

=== May ===
- May 1 – A Lockheed YF-12 sets a new international airspeed record of 2,070 mph (3,330 km/h).
- May 3
  - The U.S. Marine Corps's first attack helicopters, modified UH-1Es of Marine Observation Squadron 2 (VMO-2), arrive at Da Nang, South Vietnam, to begin operations in the Vietnam War.
  - Howard Hughes liquidates his holdings of Trans World Airlines stock. He sells 6,584,937 shares and nets $546.5 million.
- May 5 – After having trouble seeing the runway while attempting to land in heavy fog at Los Rodeos Airport on Tenerife in the Canary Islands, the pilot of Iberia Flight 401, a Lockheed L-1049 Constellation, attempts a go-around. Just after he applies full power to begin the go-around, the airliner strikes a tractor on the runway and crashes alongside the runway into Los Rodeos gorge, killing 30 of the 49 people on board.
- May 12 – The prototype HFB 320 Hansa Jet crashes due to a tail design problem; killed was manufacturer Hamburger Flugzeugbau's chief test pilot.
- May 13 – The United States suspends Operation Rolling Thunder strikes against North Vietnam.
- May 15 – The U.S. Navy deploys its first aircraft carrier to Dixie Station in the South China Sea off South Vietnam's Mekong Delta. It is a single-carrier station for the provision of air support in South Vietnam, Laos, and Cambodia, and will remain in use until August 1966.
- May 18
  - The United States resumes Operation Rolling Thunder strikes against North Vietnam.
  - Members of the United States Naval Reserve begin a volunteer airlift to support forces in South Vietnam, flying Naval Reserve C-54 Skymasters and C-118 Liftmasters on weekends. They will log 19,000 flight hours over the next 18 months alone.
- May 20 – Pakistan International Airlines Flight 705, a Boeing 720-040B on an inaugural flight carrying mostly journalists and owners of travel agencies and crewed by what the airline considered its best crew members, crashes short of the runway while descending to land at Cairo International Airport in Cairo, Egypt, killing 119 of the 125 people on board and injuring all six survivors.
- May 21 – Ernest C. Brace, an American civilian pilot flying passengers and cargo into Laos for Bird & Son under a Central Intelligence Agency contract, is taken prisoner by Communist ground troops after landing his helicopter in a dry rice paddy in Laos. He will become the longest-held civilian prisoner-of-war of the Vietnam War, serving seven years, 10 months, and one week before being released on March 28, 1973.
- May 25 – The Soviet Union announces the construction of surface-to-air missile sites in North Vietnam around Hanoi.
- May 26 – Sir Geoffrey de Havilland dies, aged 82.

=== June ===
- June 5
  - The U.S. Navy begins full-time staffing of Dixie Station off South Vietnam by one aircraft carrier.
  - The U.S. Navy's aircraft carrier presence in the Gulf of Tonkin off Vietnam reaches five ships.
- June 10 – The first automatic landing on a commercial flight with passengers aboard was achieved by British European Airways Trident 1 G-ARPR on flight BE 343 on its scheduled flight from Paris to London Heathrow
- June 15 – Two U.S. Army UH-1D Iroquois helicopters collide in mid-air over Fort Benning, Georgia, in the United States, killing 18 people.
- June 17 – Two U.S. Navy F-4B Phantom II fighters of Fighter Squadron 21 (VF-21) shoot down four North Vietnamese MiG-17s. They are the first American air-to-air kills of the Vietnam War.
- June 18 – In Operation Arc Light, the U.S. Air Force flies the first Boeing B-52 Stratofortress missions of the Vietnam War, striking enemy positions in Bến Cát District in South Vietnam. "Arc Light" will become a commonly used term for B-52 raids during the Vietnam War.
- June 25 – A U.S. Air Force Boeing C135-A bound for Okinawa crashes just after takeoff at MCAS El Toro in Orange County, California, killing all 85 on board.
- June 27 – The Vietnam War's largest airmobile operation thus far takes place as 150 helicopters airlift the U.S. Army's 173rd Airborne Brigade and two South Vietnamese Army airborne battalions to attack a Viet Cong stronghold just north of Biên Hòa, South Vietnam.

=== July ===
- The U.S. Navy's A-6 Intruder bomber sees its first combat as it enters service in the Vietnam War.
- July 1
  - The U.S. Army combines the 11th Air Assault Division (Test) with the 2nd Infantry Division to form the 1st Cavalry Division (Airmobile), a unique division that includes three airborne-qualified battalions and several battalions of helicopters which are integral to its combat elements, allowing it to engage in helicopter assault operations.
  - Continental Airlines Flight 12, a Boeing 707-124 with 66 people on board, overruns the runway while landing at Kansas City Downtown Airport in Kansas City, Missouri, and breaks into three pieces. There are no fatalities.
- July 6 – A Handley Page Hastings C1A of the Royal Air Force's No. 36 Squadron crashes at Little Baldon, Oxfordshire, England, just after takeoff from RAF Abingdon on a parachute training exercise, killing all 41 men on board.
- July 7 – McDonnell Aircraft completes its 1,000th F-4 Phantom II.
- July 8
  - A bomb explodes in a rear lavatory aboard Canadian Pacific Air Lines Flight 21, a Douglas DC-6B, in mid-air over British Columbia, Canada, blowing the tail section off. The aircraft crashes, killing all 52 people on board. The bomber is never identified.
  - During filming of the movie The Flight of the Phoenix, American movie stunt pilot Paul Mantz is killed at Winterhaven, California, piloting the Tallmantz Phoenix P-1 – a unique plane built especially for the film – when it breaks in half and crashes after he goes to full throttle to recover from striking a small hillock. A stuntman standing behind Mantz in the cockpit suffers serious injuries.
- July 10
  - Two F-4C Phantom II fighters of the 45th Tactical Fighter Squadron shoot down two MiG-17 (NATO reporting name "Fresco") fighters over North Vietnam, scoring the U.S. Air Force's first aerial victories of the Vietnam War.
  - A Skyways Coach-Air Avro 748-101 Series 1 lands heavily on a grass runway at Lympne Airport, Kent, England, digs in its nose wheel, overturns, and crashes, losing both wings and its starboard tailplane. All 52 people on board survive, although at least three are injured.
- July 11 – A U.S. Air Force 551st Airborne Early Warning and Control Wing EC-121H Warning Star crashes in the Atlantic Ocean off Nantucket, Massachusetts, killing 16 of the 19-man crew.
- July 24 – An SA-2 Guideline surface-to-air missile shoots down an aircraft for the first time in the Vietnam War. The victim is a U.S. Air Force F-4 Phantom II fighter operating over North Vietnam.
- July 27 – American aircraft strike a surface-to-air missile site for the first time, attacking an SA-2 Guideline site in North Vietnam.

=== August ===
- Chinese anti-aircraft units begin operating in North Vietnam.
- Kingdom of Libya Airlines – the future Libyan Airlines – begins flight operations.
- August 12 – The United States authorizes Operation Iron Hand air missions in Vietnam to detect and suppress enemy surface-to-air-missile sites. The early Iron Hand strikes result in many losses to the attacking American aircraft.
- August 16 – United Airlines Flight 389, a Boeing 727-22, crashes into Lake Michigan east of Fort Sheridan, Illinois. All 30 people on board die, including Clarence "Clancy" Sayen, a former president of the Air Line Pilots Association.
- August 23 – Air Wisconsin begins flight operations.
- August 24 – An American military C-130 Hercules aircraft carrying 71 passengers and crew crashes into Yau Tong Bay in Hong Kong shortly after takeoff. The plane is carrying U.S. military personnel, mostly U.S. Marines flying back to South Vietnam after leave during the Vietnam War. Thirteen people reportedly survive the crash.
- August 31 – At Honolulu International Airport in Honolulu, Hawaii, 14-year-old Harry Fegerstrom boards Hawaiian Airlines Flight 358, a Douglas DC-3 bound for Lihue Airport in Lihue, Kauai, and announces that he is hijacking the airliner to protest the State of Hawaii′s lack of political sovereignty. The incident ends without injury to anyone when Fegerstrom surrenders peacefully.

=== September ===
- The Royal Air Force carries out air strikes against Yemeni guerrillas near Aden.
- American aircraft strike the Hanoi and Haiphong areas in North Vietnam for the first time.
- September 1 – As India and Pakistan fight for control of Kashmir in the Indo-Pakistani War of 1965, which had broken out in August, the Indian Army requests support from the Indian Air Force in defending against the Pakistan Army′s Operation Grand Slam. Pakistan Air Force F-86 Sabre fighters intercept 12 Indian de Havilland Vampires that are sent to strafe Pakistani tanks, shooting down three Vampires without loss to themselves. It is history's first combat between the air forces of India and Pakistan since their independence from the United Kingdom.
- September 3 – Pakistan Air Force F-86 Sabre fighters intercept four Indian Air Force Dassault MD.454 Mystère IVa fighter-bombers over Kashmir. Luring the F-86s into a trap, the Mystères flee when the F-86s arrive, and four Indian Folland Gnat F.1 fighters intercept the F-86s. In the ensuing dogfight, Indian Squadron Leader Trevor Keelor fires his Gnat's 30-mm cannons at an F-86 and claims to have shot it down, the first claim of an air-to-air victory in Indian Air Force history, although the Pakistanis report that the F-86 returns safely. One Gnat is lost when it lands at the Pakistani airfield at Pasrur after its pilot becomes lost and it runs low on fuel; the Pakistanis claim it surrendered to a Pakistani F-104 Starfighter.
- September 4
  - Flying a Pakistan Air Force F-104A Starfighter, Flight Lieutenant Aftab Alam Khan attacks four Indian Air Force Mystères strafing a passenger train and claims one shot down using a GAR-8 Sidewinder air-to-air missile, the first missile kill in the history of the Pakistan Air Force and the first in history by a Mach 2-capable aircraft of any country. India denies losing the Mystère, claiming an explosion Khan saw was merely the Mystère's drop tank exploding after the Mystère pilot jettisoned it.
  - A flight of three Pakistani F-86 Sabres flying at low altitude to attack the India's Adampur Air Force Base intercepts four Indian Air Force Hawker Hunters at 500 feet (150 meters). During a turning dogfight that goes down to treetop level that reaches speeds as low as 200 knots (230 mph (370 km/h), Pakistan Air Force Squadron Leader Muhammad Mahmood Alam claims two Hunters shot down, although India acknowledges the loss of only one.
  - Three Pakistani F-86 Sabres led by Squadron Leader Sarfaraz Ahmed Rafiqui engage two Indian Hawker Hunters over the Indian Air Force's Halwara Air Force Station. After Rafiqui shoots down one Hunter, four more Indian Hunters arrive. In the ensuing low-level dogfight, the Pakistanis claim four Hunters destroyed, but two Pakistani Sabres are shot down, including that of Rafiqui, who ejects too low and is killed.
- September 7
  - After Indian Air Force Mystères surprise Pakistan's PAF Base Sargodha at Sargodha, Pakistan, in a dawn raid, Pakistan Air Force Flight Lieutenant Amjad Hussain Khan sets off in pursuit of two Mystères in an F-104A Starfighter. After ejecting from his plane, he returns to the base later in the day after a journey by bicycle, horse, and helicopter, claiming to have shot down both Mystères, the second so close to his Starfighter that his engine ingested debris, forcing him to eject. India acknowledges the loss of only one Mystère, claiming that Khan actually fired at it twice, and credits its pilot, Squadron Leader Ajjamada B. Devaiah, with shooting down Khan's F-104 before himself dying in action. Local villagers claim they saw the two aircraft collide and crash.
  - Intercepting a second wave of Indian aircraft – seven Hawker Hunters – attacking PAF Sargodha, Squadron Leader Muhammad Mahmood Alam, flying an F-86F Sabre, claims one Hunter shot down with a GAR-8 Sidewinder and four more in only 30 seconds by gunfire, bringing his score to seven kills. India vigorously denies his claim, but numerous witnesses confirm the kills and two Hunters crash in Pakistan.
  - Air combat in the Indo-Pakistani War. previously limited to Kashmir, spreads to East Pakistan, as the Indian Air Force sends two English Electric Canberra bombers based at Kalaikunda Air Force Station across the Bay of Bengal to strike the Pakistani Air Force F-86 Sabre base at Chittagong. They drop 1,000 lb (450 kg) bombs on the base, which is empty of aircraft, and the bombs do not explode. Then they are intercepted by Indian Air Force Hawker Hunters on their return flight, which initially mistake them for virtually identical Pakistani B-57 Canberra bombers before realizing that they are Indian Canberras. While the Canberras are on the ground apt Kalaikunda to rearm and refuel, Pakistan Air Force F-86s from Chittagong – which had staged through Tejgaon Airport in Dacca and thus had been absent from Chittagong during the Canberra raid – attack Kalaikunda and destroy both Canberras and four de Havilland Vampires. All the F-86s return safely. Nine Indian Hawker Hunters intercept a follow-up raid on Kalaikunda by Pakistani F-86s and shoot down one Sabre, killing its pilot, and damage another beyond repair.
- September 11 – The United States Army′s 1st Cavalry Division (Airmobile) arrives in South Vietnam with 400 helicopters.
- September 13 – A new hot air balloon altitude record of 9,770 ft (2,980 m) is set.
- September 16 – Pakistan Air Force Squadron Leader Muhammad Mahmood Alam and his wingman encounter two Indian Hawker Hunters over Indian territory. Alam's wingman is shot down, but Alam shoots down the Indian wingman and damages the other Hunter with a GAR-8 Sidewinder air-to-air missile. Although the Hunter returns to base, Pakistan credits Alam with two kills. His score of nine makes him Pakistan's ace of aces.
- September 17 – The Pan American World Airways Boeing 707-120B Clipper Constitution, operating as Flight 292, crashes into Chances Peak on Montserrat, killing all 30 people on board. In 1957, the aircraft involved had been the first Boeing 707 to fly.
- September 20 – A UH-2 Seasprite makes the U.S. Navy's first helicopter rescue of a pilot downed in North Vietnam.
- September 20–21 (overnight) – A Pakistan Air Force F-104 Starfighter makes a night interception of four Indian English Electra Canberra bombers as they fly toward India after a night raid on PAF Sargodha, shooting down one of them and killing one of its two-man crew.
- September 23 – A ceasefire brings the 1965 Indo-Pakistani War to an end. Neutral observers estimate that during the conflict India has lost an estimated 70 to 80 aircraft, while Pakistan has lost 20.
- September 27 – Flying Tiger Line takes delivery of its first jet aircraft, a Boeing 707.
- September 30 – Republic Aviation becomes a division of the Fairchild-Hiller Corporation.

=== October ===
- October 3 – The final elements of the United States Army′s 1st Cavalry Division (Airmobile) to arrive in Vietnam reach its base at Camp Radcliff, An Khê, South Vietnam, bringing the division to full strength there. The division will be the first to place the CH-47 Chinook helicopter in combat; the Chinook's ability to carry artillery quickly across rough terrain will revolutionize ground warfare.
- October 4–5 (overnight) – Pope Paul VI flies from New York City to Rome aboard a Trans World Airlines charter flight after completing his historic visit to New York, the only visit to the United States of his papacy.
- October 8 – The 20th Helicopter Squadron becomes the first U.S. Air Force cargo helicopter unit to deploy to South Vietnam, operating CH-3C helicopters. It supports Air Force Special Operations "Pony Express" covert operations, primarily in Laos.
- October 11 – At Molokai Airport in Hoolehua, Molokai, Hawaii, two disgruntled United States Navy sailors produce hunting knives aboard Aloha Airlines Flight 755, a Fairchild F27 bound for Honolulu International Airport in Honolulu, Hawaii, and demand to be flown to their home towns of White Earth, Minnesota, and Watonga, Oklahoma. They are subdued with shotguns and flares.
- October 14 – The United States Air Force′s first North American XB-70A Valkyrie – Air Vehicle 1 (AV-1) – surpasses Mach 3 for the first time, reaching Mach 3.02 at an altitude of 70,000 feet (21,000 meters).
- October 17 – Over North Vietnam, American aircraft carry out their first successful Iron Hand surface-to-air-missile (SAM) site detection and suppression mission.
- October 19 – The U.S. Army's month-long Ia Drang campaign begins in South Vietnam. It will be the first combat action of the U.S. Army's 1st Cavalry Division (Airmobile) and the first major combat between American and North Vietnamese forces.
- October 19–25 – U.S. Army attack helicopters and U.S. Air Force cargo aircraft play a major role in lifting the Siege of Plei Me in South Vietnam.
- October 22 – Nicholas Piantanida's attempt to set a new free-fall skydiving altitude record comes to an abortive end when wind shear tears off the top of his Strato Jump I balloon, forcing to him abandon the attempt after reaching only 16,000 feet (4,900 meters). Piantanida parachutes to safety, landing in the Saint Paul, Minnesota, city dump.
- October 26 – Armed with a pellet gun, 20-year-old Cuban exile Luis Medina Perez hijacks National Airlines Flight 209 – a Lockheed L-188 Electra flying from Miami to Key West, Florida, with 33 people aboard – and demands that it fly him to Havana, Cuba, so that he can beg Fidel Castro to allow his family to emigrate to the United States. The flight crew invites him to sit in the cockpit jump seat for the trip, and after he relaxes, the flight engineer quietly hands a fire axe to the captain, who uses it to pin Perez's arm against the wall and make him drop his weapon. With Perez under guard by United States Navy personnel aboard the airliner as passengers, the plane lands at Key West only nine minutes behind schedule.
- October 27 – A raid by Viet Cong sappers against the U.S. Marine Corps's Marble Mountain Air Facility in South Vietnam destroys 13 UH-1E and six UH-34 helicopters and damages four UH-1Es and 26 UH-34s.

=== November ===
- November 8 – American Airlines Flight 383, a Boeing 727-123, crashes on approach to Greater Cincinnati Airport in Hebron, Kentucky, killing 58 of the 62 people on board. Among the four survivors – all injured – is the American record producer Israel Horowitz.
- November 11
  - Aeroflot Flight 99, a Tupolev Tu-124V (registration CCCP-45086) is on its descent to Murmansk Airport in Murmansk in the Soviet Union when it enters a strong snow squall 2,400 meters (7,900 feet) short of the runway and goes off course. The pilot mistakes a light on the ground for the runway threshold and descends for a landing, and the airliner crashes on the ice-covered surface of Lake Kilpyavr, killing 32 of the 64 people on board.
  - United Airlines Flight 227, a Boeing 727-22, crashes short of the runway while attempting to land at Salt Lake City International Airport in Salt Lake City, Utah, killing 43 of the 91 people on board. American rodeo cowboy Bill Linderman is among the dead.
- November 14–18 – The Battle of Ia Drang in South Vietnam is the culmination of the Ia Drang Valley campaign. The U.S. Army's helicopter assault concept has made its combat debut as the 1st Cavalry Division (Airmobile) undergoes its baptism of fire, losing only four helicopters to North Vietnamese fire during the campaign.
- November 15 – A Flying Tigers Boeing 707 makes the first polar circumnavigation of the world, in 62 hours 27 minutes.
- November 17 – Wishing to fly to Cuba to liberate political prisoners of the Castro regime and armed with two guns, 16-year-old Thomas Robinson hijacks National Airlines Flight 30, a Douglas DC-8 flying from New Orleans, Louisiana, to Melbourne, Florida, with 91 people aboard, firing six shots through the floor of the airliner with a .22-caliber pistol. A passenger engages Robinson in a discussion of numismatics and coin collecting – one of Robinson's hobbies – and, when he puts both his guns down to inspect some gold coins, two officials from the National Aeronautics and Space Administration′s Project Gemini aboard as passengers tackle and subdue him.

=== December ===
- December 1 – "Freedom Flights" operating twice daily five days a week begin, using commercial aircraft to bring Cubans wishing to flee Cuba to the United States. By the time they end in April 1973, the "Freedom Flights" will have transported an estimated 300,000 Cubans from Cuba to the United States in the "largest airborne refugee operation in American history."
- December 2 – The United States Navy aircraft carrier USS Enterprise (CVA(N)-65) becomes the first nuclear-powered warship to see combat when she launches air strikes at the Viet Cong near Biên Hòa, South Vietnam.
- December 4 – Eastern Air Lines Flight 853, a Lockheed Super Constellation with 54 people on board, and Trans World Airlines Flight 42, a Boeing 707-131B carrying 58 people, collide over Carmel, New York, with the Boeing's left wing striking the Super Constellation's tail. The Boeing lands safely at John F. Kennedy International Airport in New York City, while the Super Constellation crash-lands in a pasture on Hunt Mountain near Danbury, Connecticut, and catches fire; four of those aboard the Super Constellation die.
- December 5 – A U.S. Navy A-4E Skyhawk carrying a B43 nuclear bomb falls overboard from the aircraft carrier USS Ticonderoga (CV-14) into 16,200 feet (4,900 meters) of water while the ship is in the Philippine Sea. The plane, pilot and weapon are never recovered.
- December 12 – William Randolph Lovelace II, an American physician who made contributions to aerospace medicine in the National Aeronautics and Space Administration, is killed in the crash of a Cutter Air Service Beechcraft Travel Air near Aspen, Colorado, when its pilot becomes disoriented and flies into a blind canyon. The pilot and Lovelace's wife also die in the crash.
- December 21 – New York Airways commences helicopter services in New York City between the roof of the Pan Am Building in Manhattan and John F. Kennedy International Airport in Queens.
- December 22 – American aircraft attack industrial targets in North Vietnam for the first time.
- December 25
  - Hoping to begin peace talks with the Vietcong and the North Vietnamese, President Lyndon B. Johnson's administration orders a cessation of American air strikes in Vietnam.
  - Japan Air Lines Flight 813 experienced an uncontained engine failure in its number one engine shortly after takeoff. The crew made an emergency landing at Metropolitan Oakland International Airport across the San Francisco Bay. All 41 passengers and crew managed to survive without any injuries.
- December 26 – American air strikes in South Vietnam and Laos resume.
- December 31 – Two hijackers attempt to commandeer an Aeroflot airliner in the Soviet Union, but security forces subdue them. One person is killed during the incident.

== First flights ==
=== January ===
- January 30 – Distributor Wing DW-1

=== February ===
- February 19 – Cessna 188
- February 25 – Douglas DC-9
- February 27 – Antonov An-22 (NATO reporting name "Cock")

=== April ===
- April 2 – Partenavia Oscar
- April 13 – Swearingen Merlin
- April 15 – Aérospatiale Puma prototype SA.330
- April 22 – Transavia PL-12 Airtruk

=== May ===
- May 7 – Canadair CL-84 Dynavert
- May 20 – De Havilland Canada DHC-6 Twin Otter

=== June ===
- June 2 – Aerotec Uirapuru
- June 4 – Nanchang Q-5
- June 13 – Britten-Norman Islander

=== July ===
- July 16 – OV-10 Bronco
- July 19 – Breguet Atlantic

=== August ===
- August 12 – Fuji FA200 Aero Subaru
- August 18 – Kamov Ka-26
- August 25 – Prototype of Cessna 401 and 402
- August 27 – HMPAC Puffin II
- August 31 – Aero Spacelines Super Guppy

=== September ===
- September 7 – Bell Model 209, prototype of the AH-1G Cobra
- September 27 – A-7 Corsair II

=== October ===
- October 9 – Chasle Tourbillon
- October 14 – Cessna 421 Golden Eagle
- October 25 – Sukhoi Su-7U (NATO reporting name "Moujik")

=== November ===
- Agusta A 106

== Entered service ==
- Antonov An-14 (NATO reporting name "Clod")
- Tupolev Tu-126 (NATO reporting name "Moss") with the Soviet Air Force
- Vickers Super VC10

=== April ===
- April 1 – NAMC YS-11 with Japan Domestic Airlines
- April 9 – BAC One-Eleven with British United Airways

=== May 1965 ===
- Beagle Basset CC.Mk.1 with the Royal Air Force

=== November ===
- November 30 – Convair CV-600 with Central Airlines

=== December ===
- December 22 – Convair CV-640 with Caribair

== Deadliest crash ==
The deadliest crash of this year was Pakistan International Airlines Flight 705, a Boeing 720 which crashed on final approach into Cairo, Egypt on 20 May, killing 121 of the 127 people on board.
