= Israel Horowitz (disambiguation) =

Israel Horowitz or Horovitz may refer to:

- Israel Albert Horowitz, American international chess master
- Israel Horowitz (producer), American classical music record producer, editor, columnist
- Israel Horovitz, American playwright and screenwriter
