= Ariana Afghan Airlines Flight 701 =

1969 aviation accident

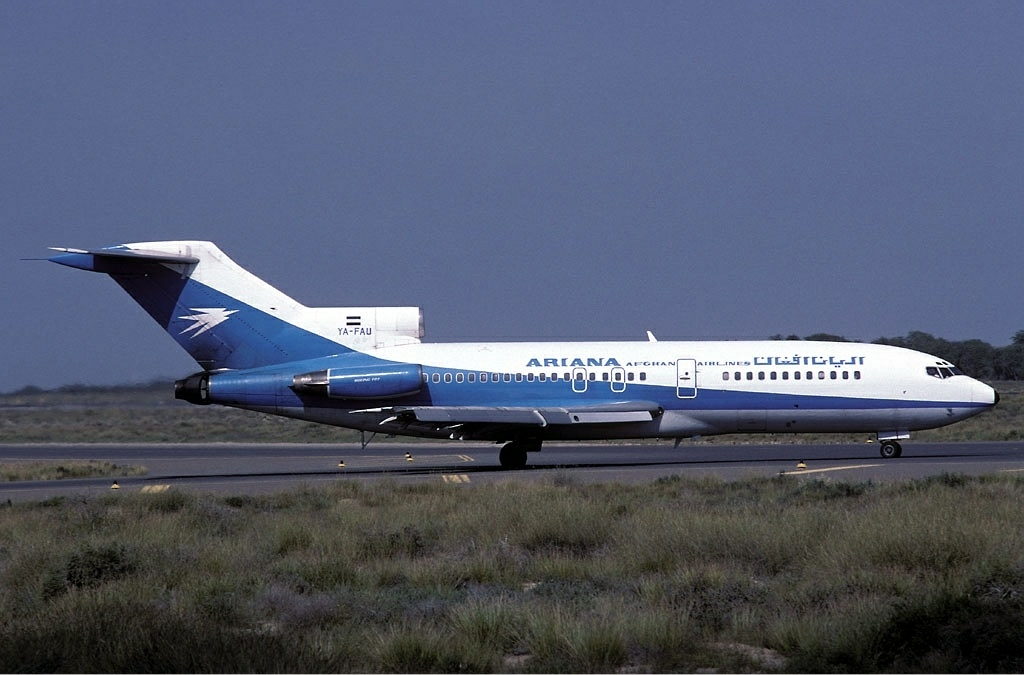
- YA-FAU, a sister ship of the accident aircraft, photographed in 1998. YA-FAZ, A similar aircraft crashed in 1998.

Occurrence
- Date: 5 January 1969
- Summary: Controlled flight into terrain in low visibility
- Site: Fernhill Lane, Fernhill, near London Gatwick Airport, Horley, Surrey, England; 51.1548°N 0.1422°W
- Total fatalities: 50 (2 on ground)
- Total injuries: 15 (1 on ground)

Aircraft
- Aircraft type: Boeing 727-113C
- Operator: Ariana Afghan Airlines
- Registration: YA-FAR
- Flight origin: Kabul International Airport, Afghanistan
- 1st stopover: Kandahar International Airport, Afghanistan
- 2nd stopover: Istanbul Atatürk Airport, Turkey
- Last stopover: Frankfurt Airport, West Germany
- Destination: London Gatwick Airport, England
- Passengers: 54
- Crew: 8
- Fatalities: 48
- Injuries: 14
- Survivors: 14

Ground casualties
- Ground fatalities: 2
- Ground injuries: 1

Ariana Afghan Airlines Flight 701 was a scheduled international flight involved in an aviation accident on 5 January 1969. The incident involved a Boeing 727 aircraft, carrying 62 individuals, that crashed into a residential property during its approach to London Gatwick Airport amidst heavy fog. The accident was primarily attributed to pilot error, specifically the failure to extend the flaps to maintain flight at the final approach speed.

The accident occurred at 01:35 (Note: All times in this article are in Greenwich Mean Time, as used in the official accident report and in parliamentary discussions about the events. Most contemporary accounts put the events one hour later: i.e. the crash was said to have occurred at 02:35.) on a Sunday morning, a time when the Gatwick area was enveloped in patches of dense, freezing fog. The Boeing 727, registered as YA-FAR (the sole aircraft of this model in the airline's fleet), descended below its correct glide slope as it approached the airport from the east. As the aircraft traversed over the small hamlet of Fernhill, located on the Surrey/Sussex border, it struck trees and rooftops, initiating a roll and subsequently crashing into a field south of Fernhill Lane. This location was approximately 1.5 miles (2.4 km) short of the runway. Following the initial impact, the aircraft collided with a large detached house, resulting in its complete demolition and the ignition of a fire.

The incident resulted in the death of 48 passengers and crew members. Additionally, two adult residents of the demolished house lost their lives due to the impact. An infant present in the house survived the incident with only minor injuries. The flight's captain, first officer, flight engineer, and eleven passengers also survived the crash.

== Location ==
Fernhill is a hamlet about 1 1/2 miles (2.4 km) from the east end of Gatwick Airport's runway and a similar distance south of the nearest town, Horley. Until boundary changes brought it fully into West Sussex (and the borough of Crawley) in 1990, it straddled the Sussex/Surrey border and was in the parish of Burstow. (Note: Ordnance Survey maps dated 1963 and 1973 indicate that the crash site was immediately on the Sussex side of the county boundary, which crossed Fernhill Lane about halfway between Donkey Lane and Peeks Brook Lane. The house demolished in the crash is shown next to the boundary line on the 1963 map, but on the later map only its grounds and former driveway are marked. In 1990, the boundary was moved further east to the eastern edge of the M23, bringing Peeks Brook Lane and all its buildings into West Sussex.) The two main roads, Peeks Brook Lane and Fernhill Road (named Fernhill Lane at the time of the accident), run south–north and west–east respectively.

The crash site was a field west of Peeks Brook Lane, south of Fernhill Lane and east of Balcombe Road, a B-road which forms the eastern boundary of the airport. Antlands Lane is further to the south. A house called Longfield south of Fernhill Lane was destroyed by the impact.

== Accident ==
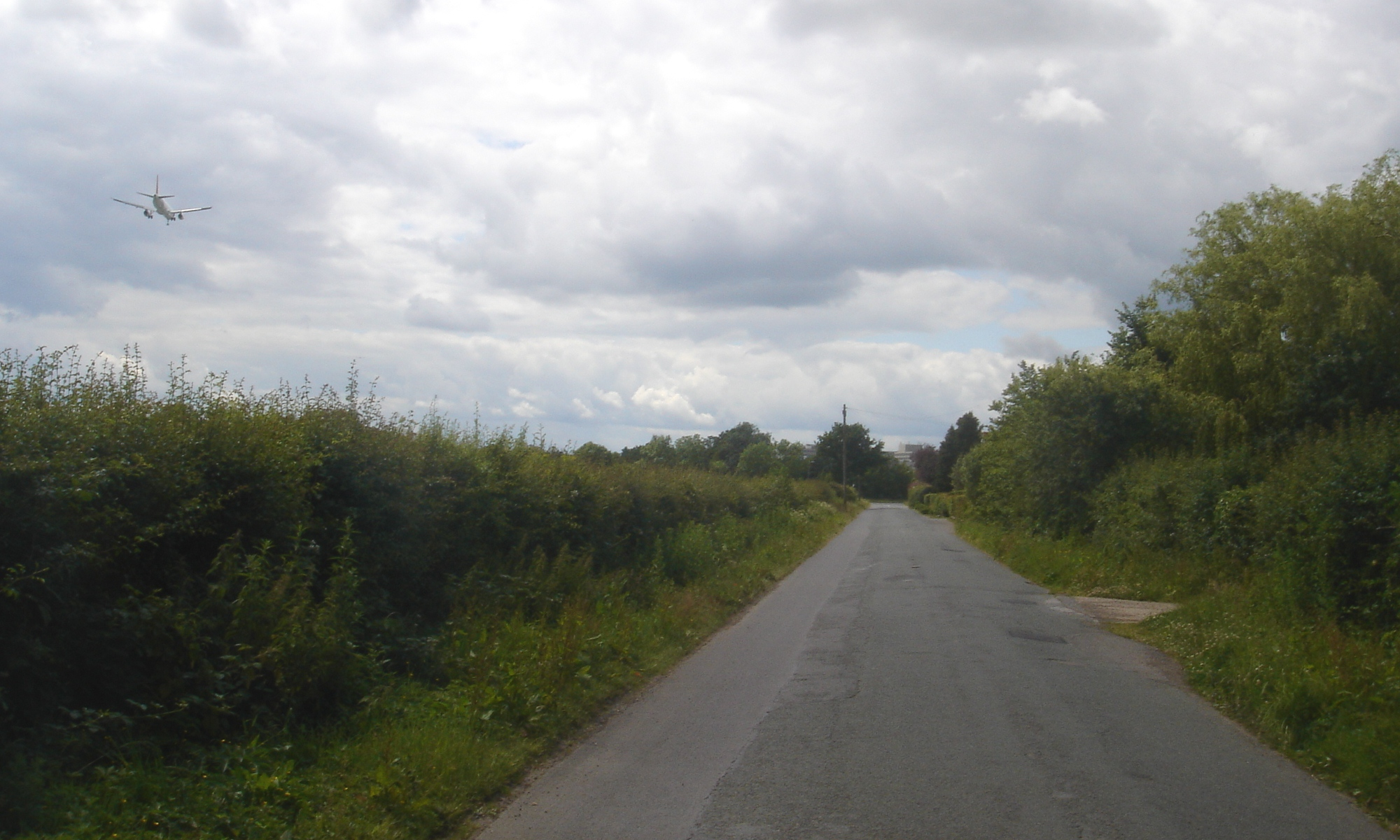
The aircraft crashed immediately south of Fernhill Road, just beyond the hedge to the left.

Flight FG 701 from Kabul International Airport to Gatwick Airport was a weekly scheduled service which stopped intermediately at Kandahar, Istanbul, and Frankfurt. A crew change also took place at Beirut, at which point Captain Nowroz, First Officer Attayee and Flight Engineer Formuly took charge.

Weather in the Gatwick area overnight on 4–5 January 1969 was poor. There was heavy, freezing fog, although the airport remained open. (International regulations require airports to remain open irrespective of ground conditions, in case of emergencies.) The fog had persisted since the previous day, and although it had cleared from most of southeast England some patches remained at Gatwick at a height of no more than 250 feet (76 m). The Captain was given weather reports which indicated that visibility varied between 50 metres (160 ft) and 500 metres (1,600 ft), the air temperature was −3 °C (27 °F) and freezing fog was predominant. Reports for London Stansted Airport (the designated alternate destination for this flight) and London Heathrow Airport indicated much clearer conditions, and the flight could also have returned to Frankfurt as enough fuel was carried. (The accident report determined that about 9,000 kilograms (20,000 lb) was left when the aircraft crashed.)

As the aircraft approached Fernhill and was within 1 1/2 miles (2.4 km) of Gatwick's runway, it clipped the top of some oak trees in the garden of a house called Twinyards on Peeks Brook Lane. This was about 500 yards (1,500 ft; 460 m) from the point of impact on the ground. It then left tyre marks on the roof of the neighbouring house and knocked chimney-pots off the house opposite, a further 264 feet (80 m) on. At this point the aircraft was only 40 feet (12 m) off the ground. It then caught a television aerial and another group of trees, damaging components on the right-side wing. As it started to roll, the aircraft's wheels touched down briefly and it started to rise again. It failed to clear Longfield, a detached house owned by William and Ann Jones which stood 300 yards (900 ft; 270 m) further west, and completely destroyed it. One engine landed in the wreckage of the house along with the rear section of the fuselage, while the forward section of the aircraft disintegrated over a 1,395-foot (465 yd; 425 m) trail. The fuel spilt and immediately caught fire, engulfing the fuselage and the wreckage of the house. The Joneses were killed, but their baby survived with minor injuries: the sides of her cot collapsed inwards, "forming a protective tent under one of the engines".

Residents of Peeks Brook Lane were the first to arrive at the crash site and to contact the emergency services. The first call was received at 0138 at Surrey Police's control room, and officers were dispatched from Horley police station. The first officers arrived seven minutes later, soon followed by PC Keith Simmonds of Oxted station who was on traffic duty that night and who saved the injured baby from the wrecked house. The fire services were also summoned at 0138, and vehicles arrived from 0156 onwards. Surrey and Sussex Fire Brigades sent 20 vehicles to the scene, and more were supplied from the airport by the British Airports Authority. Board of Trade accident investigators led by George Kelly also went to the scene. Despite a considerable police presence, their efforts were affected by onlookers obstructing them in the narrow lanes. Police blocks were set up at both ends of Fernhill Lane, and other officers were stationed at Antlands Lane diverting traffic away from Balcombe Road.

== Aircraft ==
The Boeing 727 was less than a year old at the time of the accident and was Ariana's only such aircraft. YA-FAR was built in February 1968 and received its American airworthiness certificate on 25 March 1968. On 29 April 1968, it was granted its registration in Afghanistan, and that country issued its own airworthiness certificate on 14 May 1968. At the time of the crash, the aircraft had recorded 1,715 hours of flying time.

Accident investigators from the Board of Trade took the wreckage to a hangar at Farnborough Airport for analysis. Also involved in the investigation were officials from the United States and Afghanistan. A preliminary statement was issued on 17 January 1969, and the full accident report followed in June 1970.

== Crew and passengers ==
Captain Rahim Nowroz, First Officer Abdul-Zaher Attayee and Flight Engineer Mohammed-Hussain Formuly survived but were seriously injured. The five flight attendants were killed. Captain Nowroz qualified as a pilot in 1956, was employed by Ariana the following year as a co-pilot and had flown 10,400 hours since then—including 512 in Boeing 727 aircraft, which he qualified to fly after training in 1968.

There were 54 passengers on board, 43 of whom were killed. The other 11 suffered serious injuries; they had mostly sat in the forward section of the aircraft. Apart from one girl from the United States, all were from Afghanistan, Pakistan and India (especially the Punjab region). There was a mixture of British residents returning after visiting their families and new immigrants.

== Aftermath ==
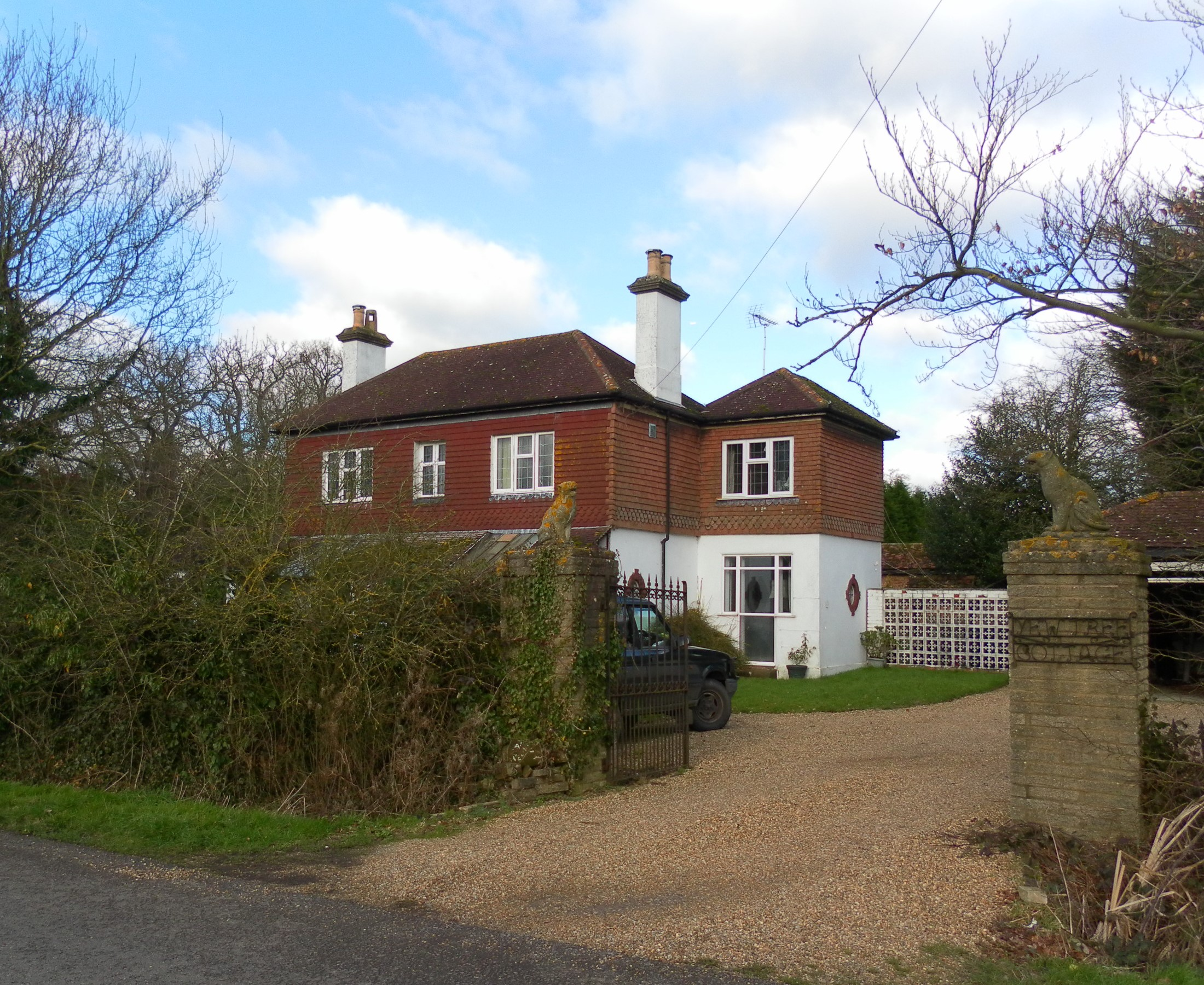
A rescue centre was set up outside Yew Tree Cottage.

The emergency services established a temporary triage facility and rescue centre outside Yew Tree Cottage and later an incident room at Horley police station. Survivors were taken into Fernhill House before being transferred to Redhill General Hospital or, in the case of five badly burned people, the McIndoe Burns Unit at East Grinstead Hospital. Two passengers died en route to Redhill General. The baby who survived in the wreckage of the house was also taken there suffering from "severe bruising and slight cuts".

The victims' bodies were transferred to the St. John Ambulance Hall at Massetts Road in Horley, where a temporary mortuary was set up. Relatives were then taken there to identify them. Some bodies were so badly burnt that personal effects had to be used to confirm the victim's identity. Other bodies were moved later to the Kenyon's undertakers firm in London. Inquiries into the 50 deaths started within days: the first inquest was that of William and Ann Jones, held at Reigate from 10 January 1969.

Queen Elizabeth II conveyed a message of condolence to Mohammed Zahir Shah, King of Afghanistan. Five police officers, including PC Simmonds, were awarded the Queen's Commendation for Brave Conduct in respect of their "service exceeding the bounds of duty" at the crash site. Also given this award were five local residents and a passenger on the aircraft who returned to the inferno to rescue family members and also put out the flames on another passenger's clothes.

In terms of fatalities, the accident was (and remains as of 2026) the worst in the vicinity of Gatwick Airport. It was the first serious incident at the airport since a crash in February 1959, when a Vickers Viscount operated by Turkish Airlines came down in a wooded area between Rusper and Newdigate, also on the Surrey/Sussex border, killing 14 passengers and injuring the Turkish Prime Minister Adnan Menderes.

== Investigation and cause ==
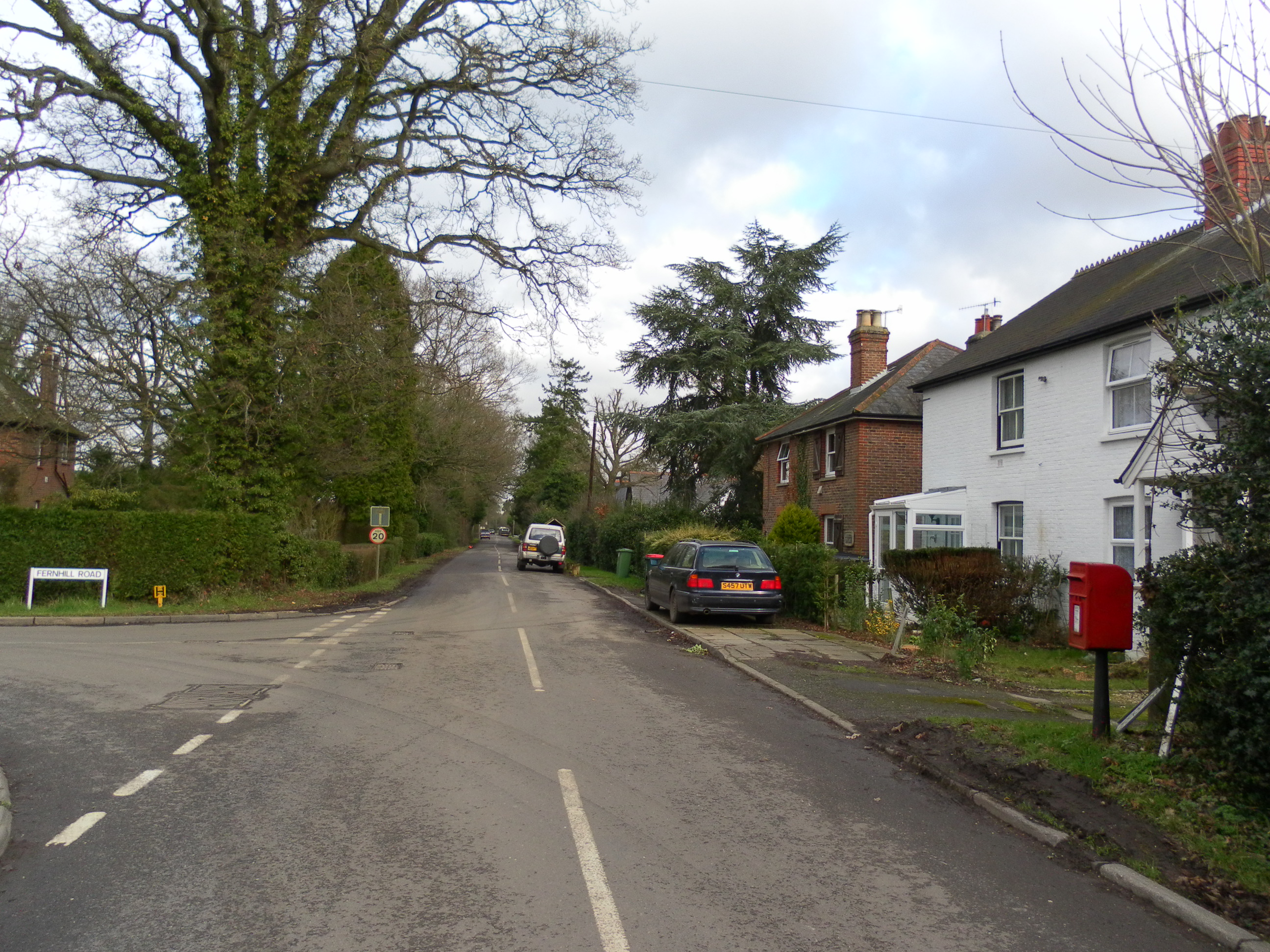
The aircraft was far below its glide slope when it passed over these houses in Peeks Brook Lane, Fernhill, hitting trees, chimneys and television aerials.

Investigators found the cause of the crash was pilot error by the captain. His decision to land at Gatwick was an "error of judgment" brought about by the "deceptive nature" of the weather conditions, which were very difficult—although this itself did not cause the accident. Instead, failure to extend the flaps in the correct sequence and at an appropriate speed caused the aircraft to fall below its glide slope, roll to the right in a nose-high attitude, and crash.

The accident report noted that YA-FAR had a full and "serviceable" instrument panel, a working VHF omnidirectional radio range (VOR) system and Instrument landing system (ILS) equipment. "Satisfactory and routine" communication between air traffic control and the aircraft was noted, and the cockpit voice recorder was recovered. There was also a flight recorder unit in the rear of the fuselage, and this was recovered on 6 January and its contents analysed.

The Captain's decision to fly to London rather than remain at Frankfurt was not criticised: he could have landed at Heathrow or Stansted, where the weather was clear, instead of Gatwick if he felt conditions were too bad, and the aircraft could even return to Germany if necessary. By the time the aircraft approached Gatwick, the runway visual range was 100 metres (330 ft) according to the latest weather report at 2350 on 4 January, and was not expected to improve that night; furthermore, this reading was confirmed at 0123 and 0127. At the time, British-registered aircraft were not allowed to land at an airport at a time when its runway visual range was lower than its "declared minimum" (Gatwick's was 1/2 mile (0.80 km)), but foreign aircraft had their own rules and were not subject to British legislation. Ariana Afghan Airlines pilots were instructed not to land when the runway visual range was lower than an airport's declared minimum (although this was not prohibited by law), but they could use their judgment on whether to descend to critical height (Note: This term, introduced in 1951, is defined as "the altitude specified in the [aircraft's] Operations Manual as the minimum height above airfield level to which an approach to land can safely be continued without visual reference to the ground.") (200 feet (61 m) for this aircraft) and then attempt a landing.

Captain Nowroz "decided that since patchy fog shifts quickly he would make an approach with a view to landing at Gatwick". The accident report stated that because he was relying principally on visual indications as he came in to land, he may have been distracted from his flight-deck duties; and patchy fog in otherwise clear conditions has been known to severely affect the sighting of visual references, sometimes leading to "disastrous errors of judgment".

Nevertheless, Captain Nowroz's decision to approach Gatwick with a view to landing there presented "no undue risk" and did not cause the accident. Instead, the cause was found to be a series of changes to speed, power and flap angle settings which were not in accordance with the airline's operating procedures and which took place in the last 15 miles (24 km) of the approach. At 0128, the aircraft picked up the ILS localiser beam, and the flaps were lowered in three stages as the aircraft's speed reduced. Soon afterwards, as it approached the ILS glideslope beam, its height and speed were reduced further and the undercarriage was extended. Then the Captain saw a light which he mistook for one at the far end of the runway—it was actually on a hill beyond the airport—and the "stabiliser out of trim" warning light came on. This had been faulty earlier in the flight, and the Captain disengaged the autopilot and the automatic glideslope tracker. At 0133, the flap angle was increased; the aircraft then began to fall below the approach slope and was travelling faster than the crew thought. Only when it reached a height of 400 feet (120 m) was an attempt made to gain height, but this happened too late.

The first three flap adjustments took place at higher speeds than recommended in the airline's procedures, although they did not exceed the Boeing 727's limits. The undercarriage was extended at too high a speed, and the next flap adjustment should have been done in two stages. The sudden change of angle caused the nose to pitch downwards and the aircraft to descend more rapidly than was appropriate for the conditions. The Captain and other crew members did not react to this for about 45 seconds, though, until at about 300 feet (91 m) from the ground they applied full power and full up elevator to try to bring the aircraft up. The accident report states that during this 45-second period, they may have been preoccupied by looking for visual confirmation of their position, such as the runway lights.

The legislation prohibiting British aircraft from landing when the runway visual range was too short was extended in September 1969 to cover aircraft from all other countries when flying to airports anywhere in the United Kingdom.

== See also ==
- American Airlines Flight 383
- Garuda Indonesia Flight 150

== Bibliography ==
- Kelly, G.M. (June 1970). Civil Aircraft Accident Report No. EW/C/303: Report on the Accident to Boeing 727-112C YA-FAR 1.5 miles east of London (Gatwick) Airport on 5th January 1969 (Report). Her Majesty's Stationery Office. Archived from the original on 7 September 2012.
