= TWA Flight 128 =

1967 aviation accident

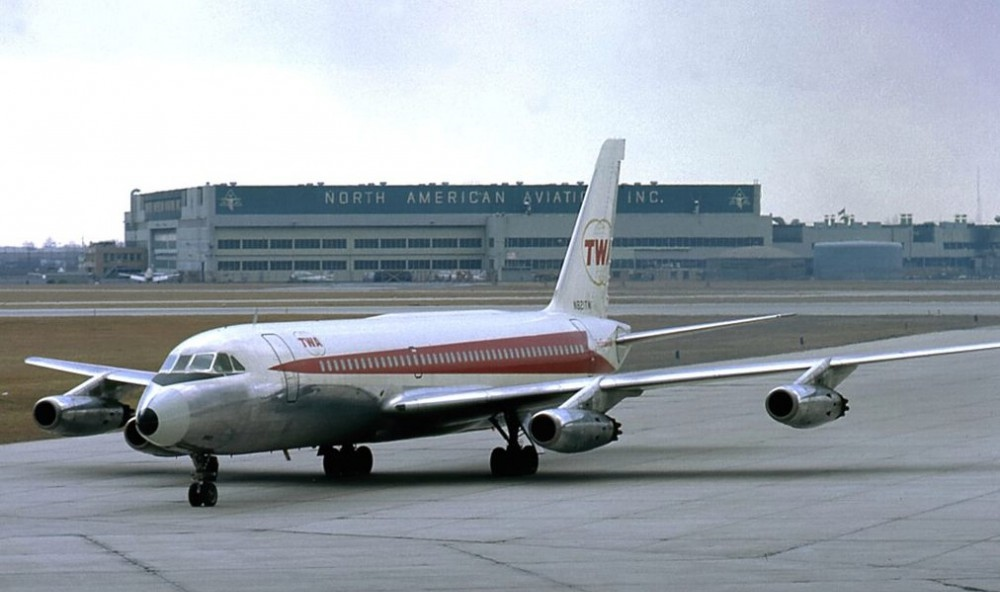
- N821TW, the aircraft involved, photographed in January 1967

Accident
- Date: November 20, 1967
- Summary: Controlled flight into terrain due to pilot error
- Site: Hebron, Kentucky; 39°5′3.73″N 84°40′11.99″W

Aircraft
- Aircraft type: Convair 880
- Operator: Trans World Airlines
- Registration: N821TW
- Flight origin: Los Angeles International Airport
- 1st stopover: Cincinnati/Northern Kentucky International Airport
- 2nd stopover: Pittsburgh International Airport
- Destination: Logan International Airport
- Occupants: 82
- Passengers: 75
- Crew: 7
- Fatalities: 70
- Injuries: 12
- Survivors: 12

TWA Flight 128 was a regularly scheduled Trans World Airlines passenger flight from Los Angeles to Boston, with intermediate stops in Cincinnati and Pittsburgh. On November 20, 1967, Flight 128 crashed on final approach to Cincinnati/Northern Kentucky International Airport. 70 of the 82 people aboard the Convair 880 were killed in the crash.

== Aircraft and crew ==
On November 20, 1967, TWA Flight 128 was operated using a Convair 880 narrow-body jet airliner (registration number N821TW). The Convair was manufactured in December 1960 and placed in service by TWA in January 1961. It had accumulated a total of 18,850 hours of operating time prior to the accident flight. While various maintenance writeups had occurred and been cleared in accordance with existing maintenance procedures, in no case were both the captain's and first officer's altimeters reported malfunctioning at the same time.

The flight's captain, 45-year-old Charles L. Cochran, had accumulated 12,895 hours of flight time, including 1,390 hours in the Convair 880. The first officer, 33-year-old Robert P. Moyers, had approximately 2,647 hours of flight time, including 447 in the Convair 880. The flight engineer, 29-year-old Jerry L. Roades, had 3,479 hours of piloting experience, none of which were in the Convair 880, but had 288 hours of experience as a flight engineer in the 880. The flight also had four flight attendants on board.

== Accident ==
Flight 128 departed Los Angeles at 17:37 Eastern Standard Time (Note: All times provided are based on those given in the NTSB's final report, which are in Eastern Standard Time.) and operated to Cincinnati without incident. The flight was initially scheduled to make an Instrument Landing System approach to Greater Cincinnati Airport's runway 18 (now runway 18C). The outer marker beacon for runway 18 was operational, but the middle marker beacon, glide slope, and runway approach lights were inoperative. Under these conditions, proper procedure would be to maintain the minimum approach altitude of 1,290 feet (390 m) above mean sea level until the pilots made visual contact with the runway.

At 20:56, Flight 128 reported passing the outer marker, and was cleared to land. The flight crew then initiated their descent and began performing their final landing checklist. While on final approach, the aircraft descended to an elevation of 875 feet (267 m), where it first struck trees in a spot 9,357 feet (2,852 m) short of runway 18 and 429 feet (131 m) right of the runway's extended centerline. The first impact was described by a survivor as like a hard landing; this was followed by a series of hard bumps and the airplane's final impact. The aircraft's final position was in a wooded area 6,878 feet (2,096 m) short of the runway, where it disintegrated and was enveloped in flames.

Of the 82 people on board the aircraft, 60 were killed immediately, and another 10 died in the days following the crash. Twelve people (two crew members and 10 passengers) survived with injuries. One of the surviving passengers reported that the plane broke apart in front of him, he stepped out and ran from the wreckage shortly before it exploded.

== Aftermath ==
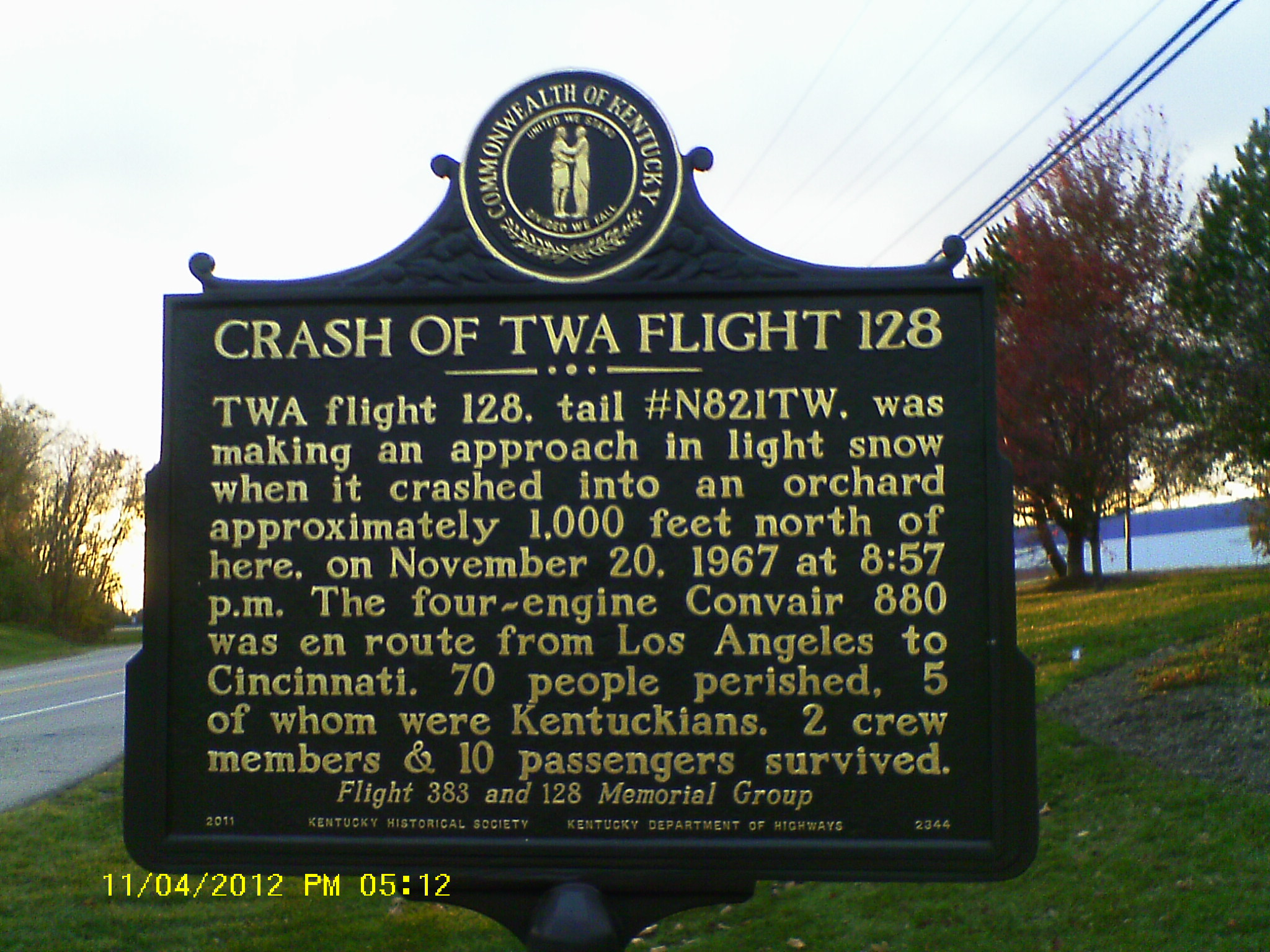
TWA Flight 128 Marker in Hebron, KY

The National Transportation Safety Board investigated the accident. NTSB investigators determined the likely cause of the accident to be crew error, in attempting a visual no-glide-slope approach at night during deteriorating weather conditions, without an adequate altimeter cross-reference.

The governor of Ohio, Jim Rhodes, requested runway 18 be closed. After the runway reopened, high intensity lights were installed on the hillside along with glide-slope equipment beacons on recommendation of the National Transportation Safety Board.

== See also ==
- 1961 Cincinnati Zantop DC-4 crash
- American Airlines Flight 383, that crashed near Flight 128's site.
