= Garuda Indonesian Airways Flight 150 =

1975 aviation accident

Coordinates: 2.9888243°S 104.7568507°E

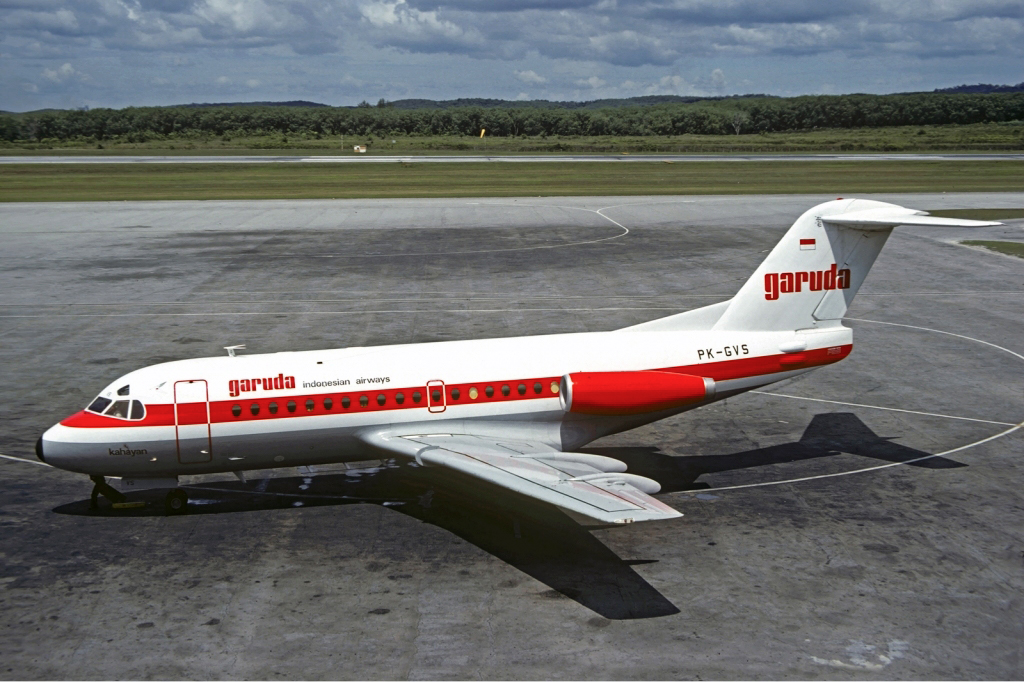
- Garuda Indonesian Airways Fokker F28-1000 PK-GVS, sister ship of the accident aircraft

Accident
- Date: 24 September 1975
- Summary: Crashed on approach in poor weather
- Site: near Palembang, South Sumatra
- Total fatalities: 26 (25 on board, 1 on ground)
- Total injuries: 36

Aircraft
- Aircraft type: Fokker F-28 Fellowship
- Aircraft name: Mahakem
- Operator: Garuda Indonesian Airways (Now Garuda Indonesia)
- Registration: PK-GVC
- Flight origin: Kemayoran Airport, Jakarta
- Destination: Sultan Mahmud Badaruddin II International Airport, Palembang
- Occupants: 61
- Passengers: 57
- Crew: 4
- Fatalities: 25
- Injuries: 36
- Survivors: 36

Ground casualties
- Ground fatalities: 1

Garuda Indonesian Airways Flight 150 was a scheduled Indonesian domestic passenger flight from Kemayoran Airport, Jakarta to Sultan Mahmud Badaruddin II Airport, Palembang. On 24 September 1975, Flight 150 crashed on approach due to poor weather and fog just 2.5 miles (2.2 nmi; 4.0 km) from the town of Palembang. The accident killed 25 out of the 61 passengers and crew on board, and one person on the ground.

== Aircraft ==
The Fokker F-28 Fellowship registration PK-GVC was built in 1971, with only 1000 hours of flying time before the fatal accident. The aircraft was reregistered from PK-GJX

== Accident ==
Flight 150 took off from Kemayoran Airport on a short-haul flight to Sultan Mahmud Badaruddin II Airport with 61 passengers and crew on board. Less than one hour after takeoff, Flight 150 was cleared by air traffic controllers at Sultan Mahmud Badaruddin II Airport to start their approach to land on runway 28 (now runway 29). The flaps and landing gear were down as flight 150 was nearing the airport when fog started shadowing the town and the airport. Flight 150 entered the fog two minutes later. The tail end of the aircraft hit trees and crashed, breaking into two parts. There was no fire when flight 150 crashed. The crash killed 25 people on board and one person on the ground. 36 passengers survived the crash and were taken to a local hospital.

== Cause ==
An investigation into the crash found that the visual flight in weather conditions below minimums. Flight 150 was in a downwind leg as the aircraft was on approach to the airport in fog. It is unknown why the air traffic controller did not tell the pilots of Flight 150 to execute a missed approach or why the pilots themselves did not execute a missed approach.

== See also ==
- Ariana Afghan Airlines Flight 701
