= Ariana Afghan Airlines Flight 202 =

1959 aviation accident

Coordinates: 33°50′N 35°50′E

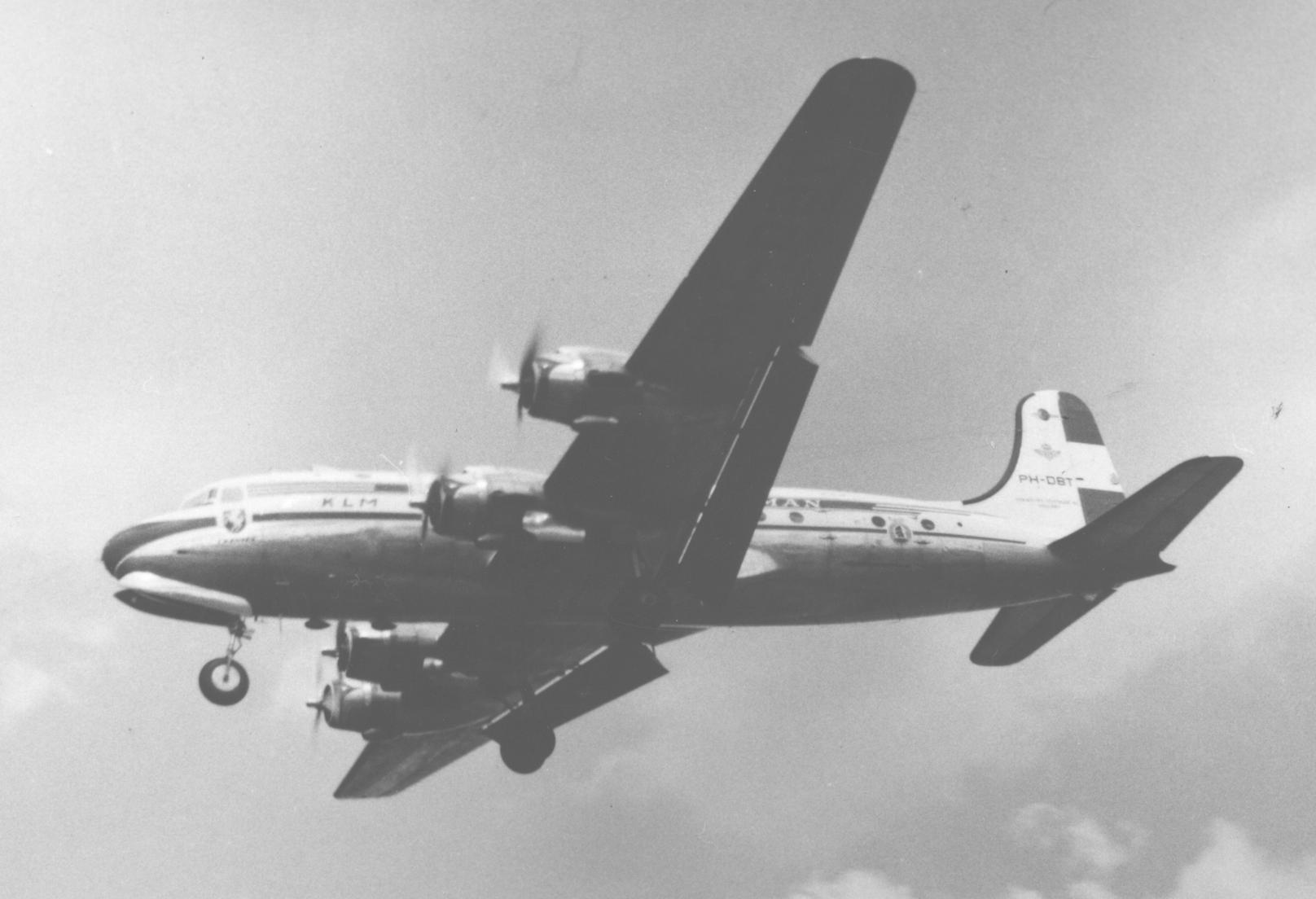
- Aircraft, similar to the one involved in this incident, photographed while under operation by KLM Royal Dutch Airlines in 1954.

Occurrence
- Date: 21 November 1959
- Summary: Controlled flight into terrain
- Site: Aramoun, Lebanon

Aircraft
- Aircraft type: Douglas DC-4
- Operator: Ariana Afghan Airlines
- Registration: YA-BAG
- Flight origin: Beirut International Airport, Lebanon
- 1st stopover: Mehrabad International Airport, Iran
- 2nd stopover: Kandahar International Airport, Afghanistan
- Destination: Kabul International Airport, Afghanistan
- Occupants: 27
- Passengers: 22
- Crew: 5
- Fatalities: 24
- Injuries: 3
- Survivors: 3

Ariana Afghan Airlines Flight 202 (YA-BAG) was a scheduled international civilian passenger flight from Lebanon to Afghanistan on 21 November 1959. It took off from Beirut at 1:30AM Local Time, and was destined for Kabul, with a stopover at Mehrabad in Iran and another stopover at Kandahar in Afghanistan. Two minutes after takeoff, the aircraft, a Douglas DC-4, crashed into the side of a hill in Aramoun. The impact caused a fire to break out in the cabin, killing 24 of the flight's 27 total occupants.

== Investigation ==
An investigation was launched into the cause of the crash; the report found that a day earlier, after arriving from Frankfurt, West Germany, the flight was delayed for 20 hours due to technical difficulties. Two causes were proposed:

- Navigational error: the pilot did not properly execute a right turn as early as he should have, either because he forgot or was distracted by some unusual occurrence;
- Fire in the No. 1 engine, which induced the pilot to start emergency actions with a resulting reduction in the rate of turn and climb.
