= Ariana Afghan Airlines =

State-owned flag carrier of Afghanistan

Ariana Afghan Airlines د آريانا افغان هوايي شرکت

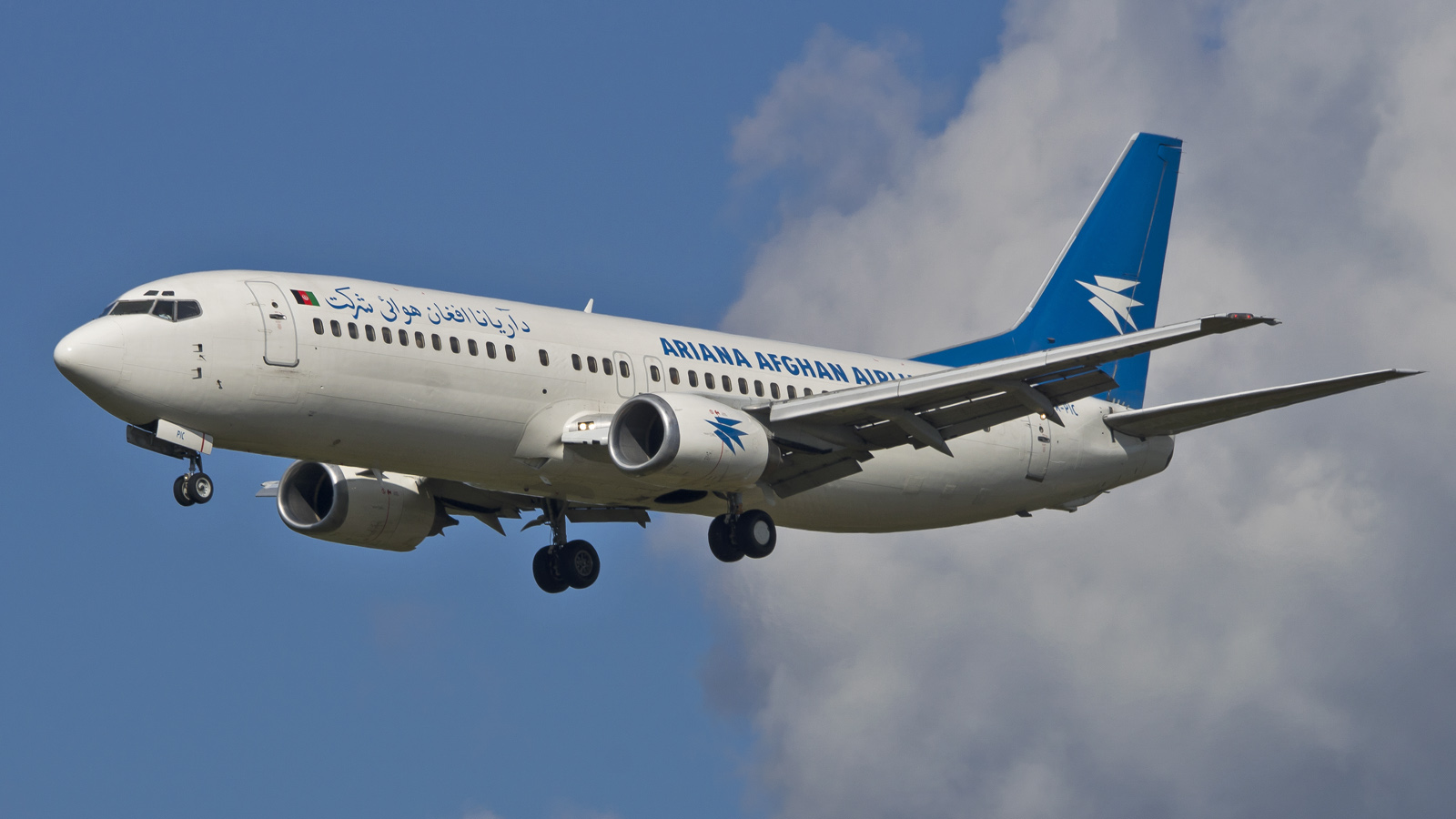
IATA	ICAO	Call sign
FG	AFG	ARIANA
- Founded: 27 January 1955; 71 years ago
- Hubs: Kabul International Airport
- Secondary hubs: Kandahar International Airport
- Frequent-flyer program: Ariana Loyalty Club
- Fleet size: 6
- Destinations: 13
- Parent company: Pashtany Bank
- Headquarters: Kabul, Afghanistan
- Key people: Rahmatullah Agha (Acting President); Ahsanullah Ahsan (Commercial Director)
- Website: flyariana.com

Ariana Afghan Airlines Co. Ltd., (Note: Pashto: د آريانا افغان هوايي شرکت, romanized: Də Āryānā Afǧān Hawāyi Širkat, IPA: [dǝ ʔɑɾjɑˈnɑ ʔɐʊˈɣɑn hɐˈwɑji ʃɪɾˈkat]) also known simply as Ariana, is the flag carrier and largest airline of Afghanistan. Founded in 1955, Ariana is state owned and the oldest airline in the country. The company has its main base at Kabul International Airport, from which it operates domestic flights and international connections to destinations in China, India, Pakistan, Russia, Saudi Arabia, Turkey, and the United Arab Emirates. The carrier is headquartered in Shāre Naw district, Kabul. Ariana Afghan Airlines has been on the list of air carriers banned in the European Union since October 2006.

== History ==
=== Early years ===
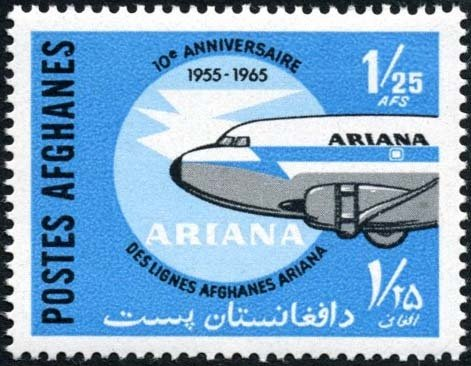
Postage stamp of Afghanistan from 1965 commemorating the 10th anniversary of Ariana. The logo features an Afghan swallow bird and a blue field representing precious lapis lazuli stones; it was personally designed by the then King of Afghanistan, Zahir Shah.

The airline was set up on 27 January 1955. It was established as Aryana Airlines with the assistance of Indamer Co. Ltd., which initially held a 49% stake, and the government of Afghanistan owned the balance. At the beginning, services were operated to Bahrain, India, Iran, and Lebanon, with a fleet of three Douglas DC-3s. In 1957, Pan American World Airways became the minor shareholder of the airline when it took over the 49% interest from Indamer. Domestic scheduled services started the same year. By April 1960, a fleet of three DC-3s was being used for linking Kabul with Amritsar, Delhi, Jeddah, and Karachi, as well as with some points within Afghanistan, while a single DC-4 operated the Kabul–Kandahar–Tehran–Damascus–Beirut–Ankara–Prague–Frankfurt service, the so-called "Marco Polo" route. In the early 1960s, US$1,100,000 (equivalent to $12,000,000 in 2025) from US aid to Afghanistan was used to capitalise the company.

By March 1970, the airline had 650 employees. At this time, the fleet comprised one Boeing 727-100C, one CV-440, one DC-3 and two Douglas DC-6s that worked on routes serving the Middle East, India, Pakistan, the USSR, and Istanbul, Frankfurt, and London. Domestic services were then operated by Bakhtar Alwatana, which was established by the government in 1967 for this purpose.

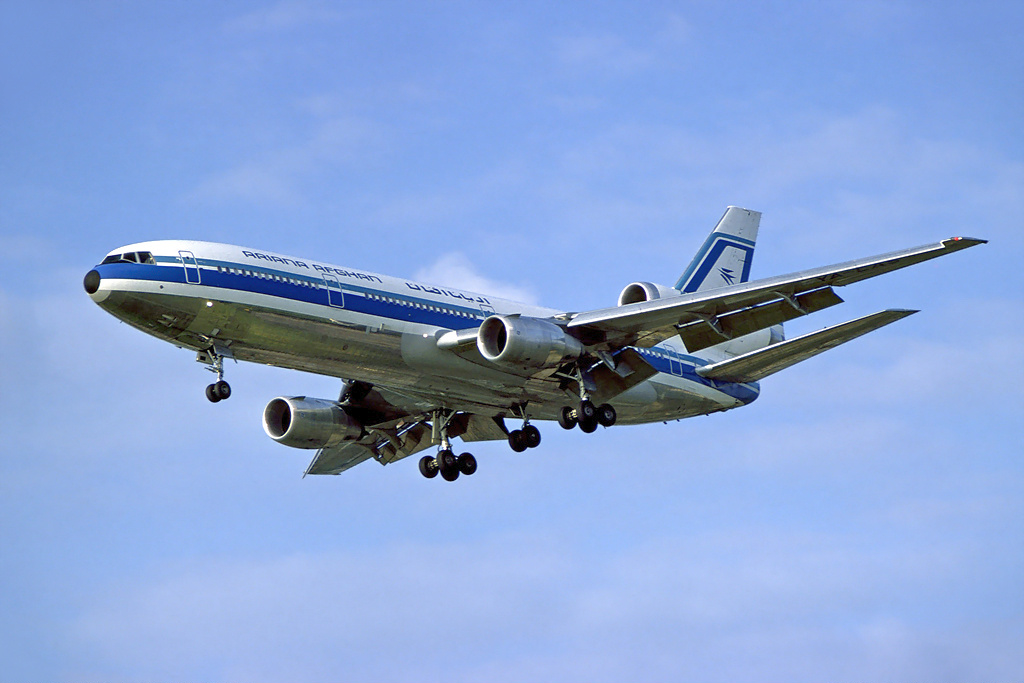
An Ariana Afghan Airlines DC-10-30 in 1980. Throughout its history, the airline operated a single aircraft of the type that was sold in the mid-1980s, following the Soviet invasion of Afghanistan.

The carrier's first widebody aircraft, a McDonnell Douglas DC-10-30, entered the fleet in early October 1979. By March 1985, the aircraft fleet consisted of the DC-10 and two Boeing 727-100Cs. In the mid-1980s, during the Soviet–Afghan War, the carrier was forced to sell the DC-10 to British Caledonian, as the Soviets wanted the carrier to fly the Tupolev Tu-154 as a replacement. In October 1985, Ariana was taken over by Bakhtar Afghan Airlines, which became the country's new national airline. In 1986, Bakhtar ordered two Tupolev Tu-154Ms; the airline took possession of these aircraft in April 1987. In February 1988, Bakhtar was merged back into Ariana, thus creating an airline which could serve both short and long haul routes.

=== Operational crisis ===
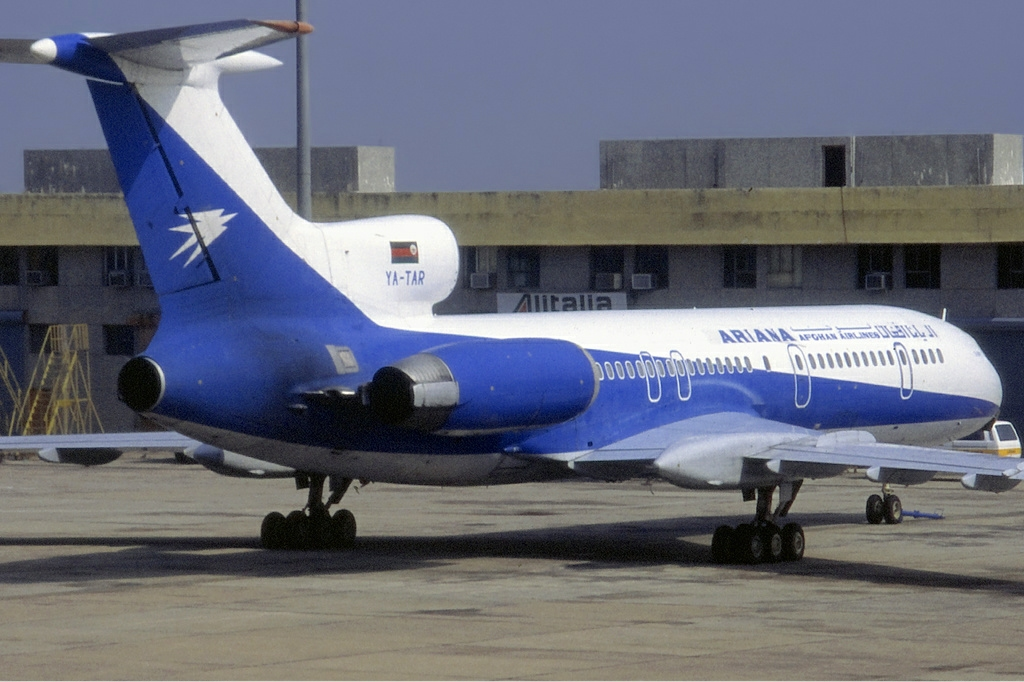
An Ariana Afghan Airlines Tupolev Tu-154M in 1992.

Following the fall of Kabul to the Taliban in 1996 and the proclamation of the Islamic Emirate of Afghanistan, the country faced substantial economic sanctions from the international sector during the Taliban regime. The sanctions, along with the Taliban government's control of the company and the grounding of many of the carrier's international flights, had a devastating effect on the economic health of the company through the 1990s. The fleet was reduced to only a handful of Russian and Ukrainian built An-26s, Yakovlev Yak-40s and three Boeing 727s, which were used on the longest domestic routes. In October 1996, Pakistan provided a temporary maintenance and operational base at Karachi. With no overseas assets, by 1999 Ariana's international operations consisted of flights to Dubai only; also, limited cargo flights continued into China's western provinces. However, sanctions imposed by UN Security Council Resolution 1267 in November 1999 forced the airline to suspend overseas operations. In November 2001, Ariana was grounded completely.

According to the Los Angeles Times:

With the Taliban's blessing, Bin Laden effectively had hijacked Ariana, the national civilian airline of Afghanistan. For four years, according to former U.S. aides and exiled Afghan officials, Ariana's passenger and charter flights ferried Islamic militants, arms, cash and opium through the United Arab Emirates and Pakistan. Members of Bin Laden's Al Qaeda terrorist network were provided false Ariana identification that gave them free run of airports in the Middle East.

According to people interviewed by the Los Angeles Times, Viktor Bout's companies helped in running the airline.

=== War in Afghanistan ===
Following the overthrow of the Taliban government during Operation Enduring Freedom, Ariana began to rebuild its operations in December 2001. About a month later, the UN sanctions were lifted by United Nations Security Council Resolution 1388, permitting the airline to resume international routes again.

In 2002, the government of India gave the carrier a gift of three ex-Air India Airbus A300s. Ariana's first international passenger flight since 1999 landed at Indira Gandhi International Airport in January 2002, followed by routes to Pakistan and Germany in June and October the same year, respectively. In 2005, India signed an agreement on aviation cooperation with Afghanistan, with Air India training 50 officials for Ariana.

=== EU ban ===
Due to safety regulations, Ariana was mostly banned from flying into European Union airspace in March 2006, with the European Commission allowing the carrier to fly only a single France-registered Airbus A310 into the member states; the ban was extended to the entire fleet in October of that year. The ban was confirmed in subsequent updates of the list released in late 2009 and March 2010. In November 2010, all Afghanistan-registered aircraft were banned from operating in the European Union. as of June 2026, Ariana was still included in the list.

=== Taliban takeover ===
All commercial flights were cancelled following the Taliban taking over the capital city of Kabul in August 2021. Domestic flights resumed in September. As of 2026, some international flights to the Middle East and Turkey have resumed.

== Destinations ==
As of August 2026, Ariana Afghan Airlines serves domestic, as well as several international destinations in China, India, Russia, Saudi Arabia, Turkey and the United Arab Emirates. Most of these routes operate from Kabul.

Previously, Ariana also served flights to other European countries including to the United Kingdom, France, Italy, Germany, the Czech Republic and the Netherlands.

Country	City	Airport	Note	Ref
Afghanistan	Herat	Khwaja Abdullah Ansari International Airport		
Afghanistan	Kabul	Kabul International Airport	Hub	
Afghanistan	Kandahar	Ahmad Shah Baba International Airport		
Afghanistan	Mazar-i-Sharif	Mawlana Jalaluddin Mohammad Balkhi International Airport		
China	Ürümqi	Ürümqi Tianshan International Airport		
Cuba	Havana	José Martí International Airport	Terminated	
Czech Republic	Prague	Václav Havel Airport Prague	Terminated	
France	Paris	Paris Charles de Gaulle Airport	Terminated	
Germany	Berlin	Berlin Schönefeld Airport	Airport closed	
Germany	Frankfurt	Frankfurt Airport	Terminated	
India	Amritsar	Sri Guru Ram Das Ji International Airport	Terminated	
India	Delhi	Indira Gandhi International Airport		
Iran	Tehran	Mehrabad International Airport	Terminated	
Ireland	Shannon	Shannon Airport	Terminated	
Italy	Rome	Rome Fiumicino Airport	Terminated	
Lebanon	Beirut	Beirut–Rafic Hariri International Airport	Terminated	
Netherlands	Amsterdam	Amsterdam Airport Schiphol	Terminated	
Pakistan	Islamabad	Islamabad International Airport		
Russia	Moscow	Alexander Pushkin Sheremetyevo International Airport		
Saudi Arabia	Jeddah	King Abdulaziz International Airport		
Syria	Damascus	Damascus International Airport	Terminated	
Turkey	Ankara	Ankara Esenboğa Airport		
Turkey	Istanbul	Istanbul Airport		
United Arab Emirates	Dubai	Dubai International Airport		
United Kingdom	London	Gatwick Airport	Terminated	
United Kingdom	London	Heathrow Airport	Terminated	
Uzbekistan	Tashkent	Tashkent International Airport	Terminated	

== Fleet ==
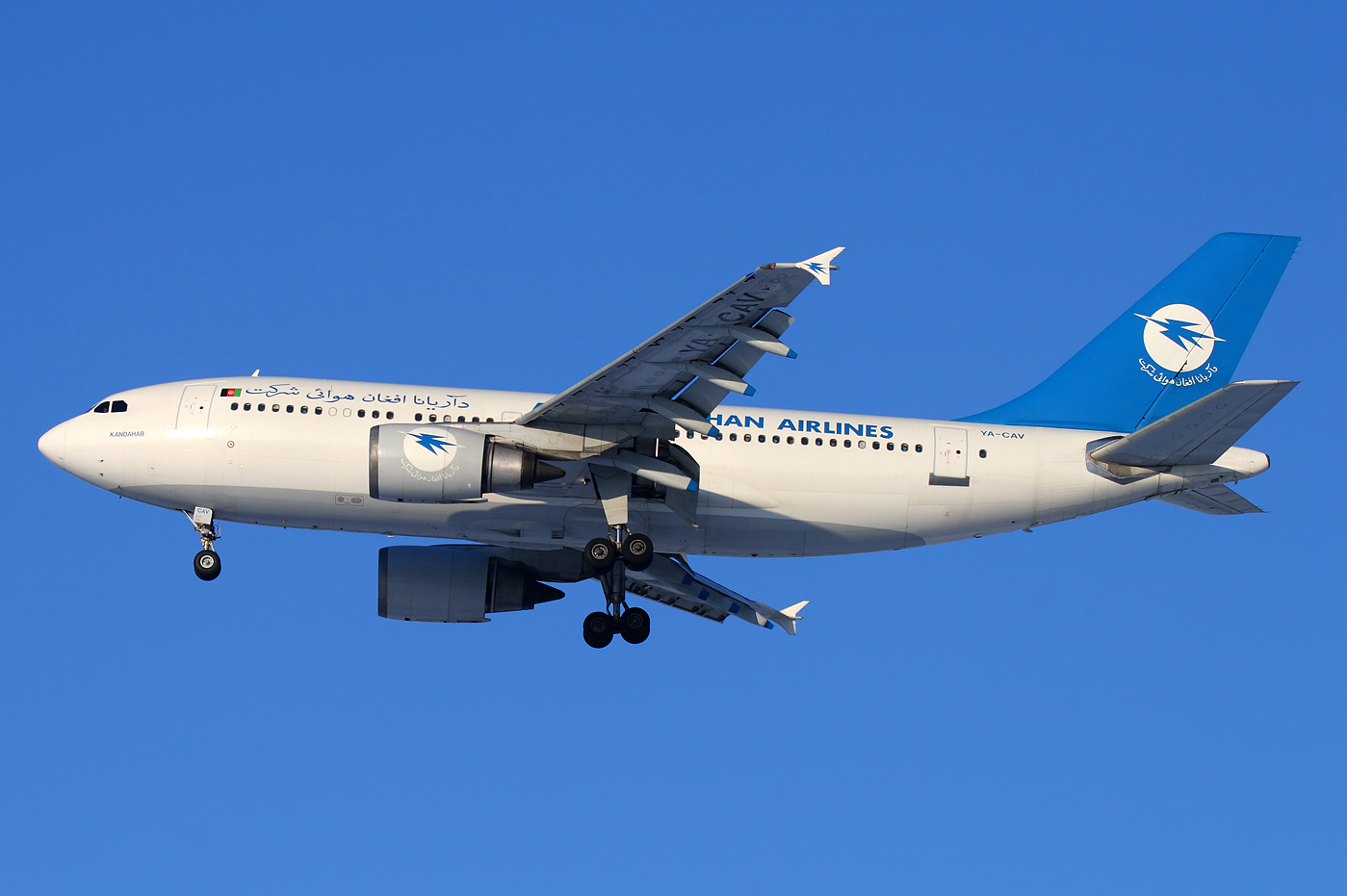
Ariana Afghan Airlines Airbus A310-300

Ariana Afghan Airlines Boeing 737-500 YA-FGA in operation at Mazar-i-Sharif Airport, 2025

=== Current fleet ===
As of August 2025 the Ariana Afghan Airlines fleet consists of the following aircraft:

Ariana Afghan Airlines fleet
Aircraft	In fleet	Orders	Passengers			Notes
Aircraft	In fleet	Orders	C	Y	Total	Notes
Airbus A310-300	3	—	12	230	230	
Boeing 737-400	2	—	8	134	142	
Boeing 737-500	1	—	8	148	156	
Total	6	—				

=== Historical fleet ===
Ariana operated the following equipment all through its history:

- Airbus A300B4
- Airbus A310-200
- Airbus A320-200
- Airbus A321-100
- Antonov An-12BP
- Antonov An-12T
- Antonov An-24
- Antonov An-24B
- Antonov An-24RV
- Antonov An-26
- Antonov An-26B
- Boeing 707-120B
- Boeing 707-320C
- Boeing 720B
- Boeing 727-100C
- Boeing 727-200
- Boeing 727-200F
- Boeing 737-300
- Boeing 737-800
- Boeing 747-200B
- Boeing 757-200
- Convair CV-440
- Douglas C-47
- Douglas C-47A
- Douglas C-54B
- Douglas C-54G
- Douglas DC-4
- Douglas DC-6A
- McDonnell Douglas DC-10-30
- Tupolev Tu-134
- Tupolev Tu-154B
- Tupolev Tu-154M
- Yakovlev Yak-40
Former Ariana Afghan Airlines fleet

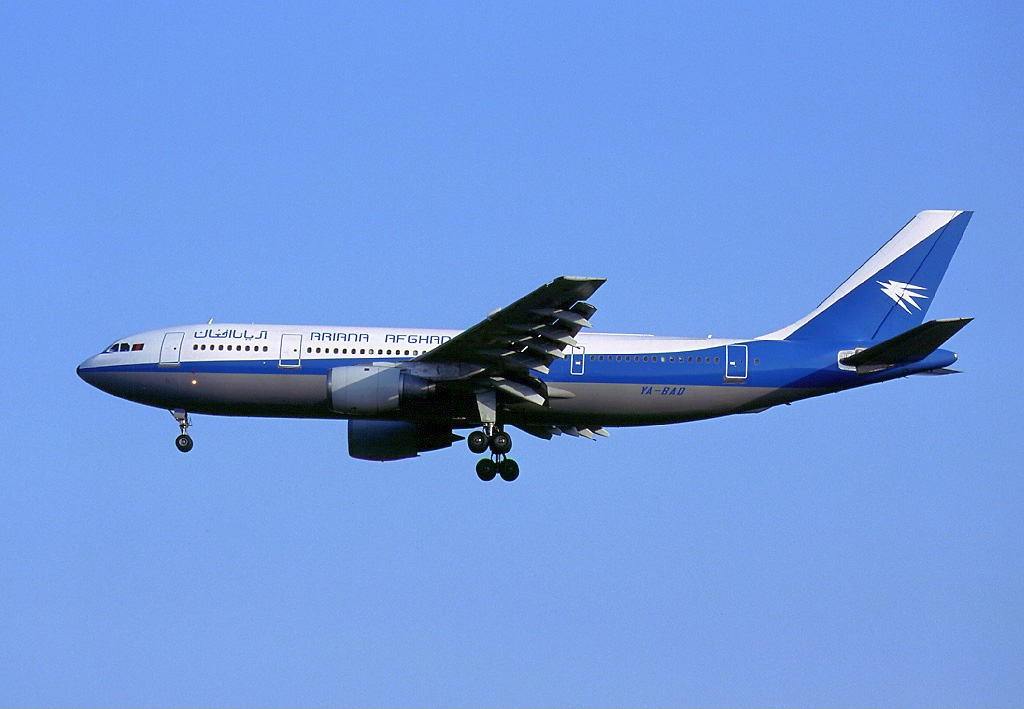
Airbus A300B4-200 in 2003. With registration YA-BAD this aircraft was written off in an overrun episode at Istanbul Atatürk Airport in March 2007.

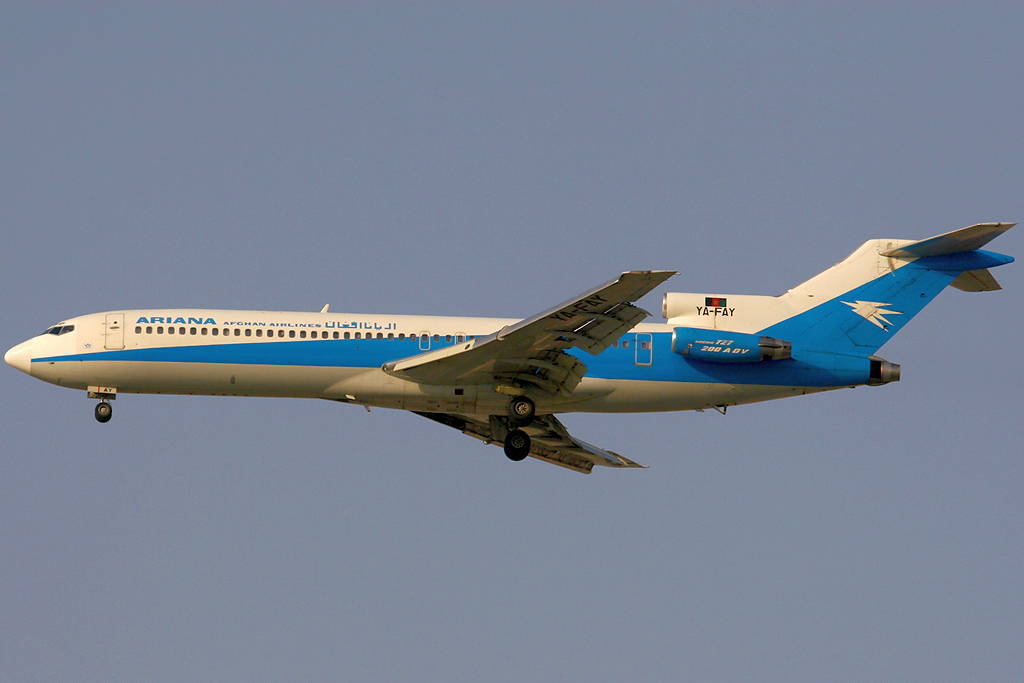
Boeing 727-200 Advanced

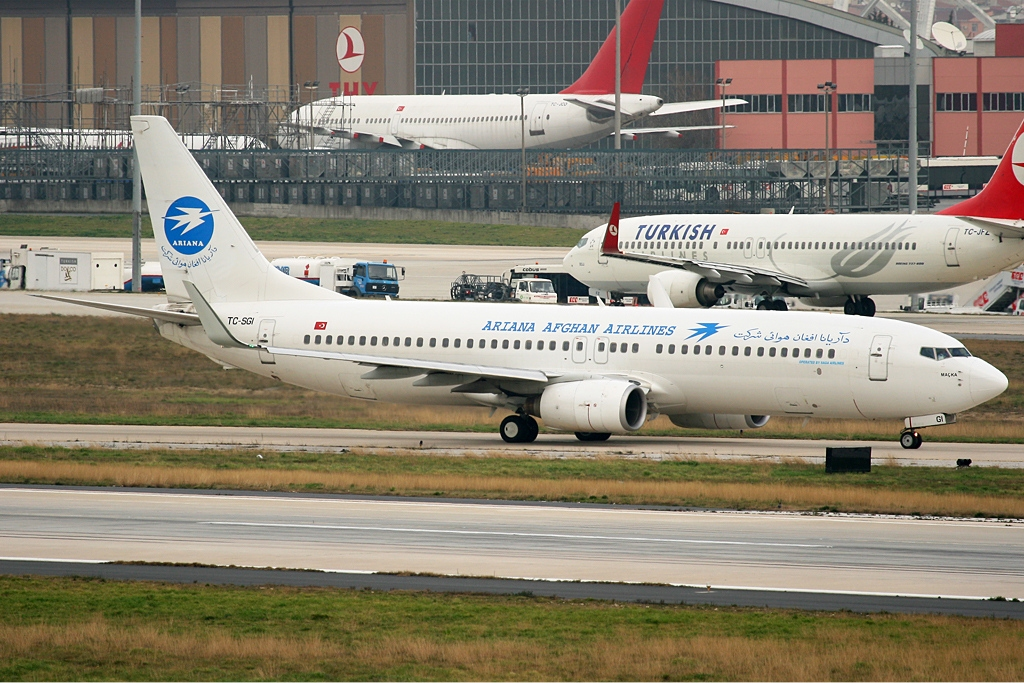
Boeing 737-800

== Accidents and incidents ==
According to Aviation Safety Network, as of October 2012 Ariana Afghan Airlines has written off 19 aircraft involved in 13 events, seven of them being deadly. Casualties totaled 154 deaths. The following list includes occurrences that led to at least one fatality, resulted in a write-off of the aircraft involved, or both.

Date	Location	Aircraft	Tail number	Aircraft damage	Fatalities	Description	Refs
2 November 1959	Greece	Douglas C-47A	YA-AAD	W/O	Unknown	Unknown	
21 November 1959	(Lebanon) Off Beirut	Douglas DC-4	YA-BAG	W/O	24/27	Crashed shortly after takeoff from Beirut International Airport, during initial climbout. The aircraft was due to operate the second leg of an international scheduled Frankfurt–Beirut–Tehran–Kandahar–Kabul passenger service as Flight 202.	
5 January 1969	(United Kingdom) London	Boeing 727-100C	YA-FAR	W/O	50	Crashed on approach to London Gatwick Airport when attempting to land in dense fog as it descended below the glideslope. Forty-eight people were killed on the plane, as well as two on the ground. The aircraft was completing an international scheduled Kabul–Kandahar–Beirut–Istanbul–Frankfurt–London passenger service as Flight 701.	
15 January 1969	(Afghanistan) Kabul	Douglas C-47DL	YA-BAD	W/O	Unknown	Ground collision.	
10 December 1988	Pakistan	Antonov An-26	Unknown	W/O	25/25	The aircraft was shot down by Pakistani fighters when it was flying a domestic Khost–Kabul passenger service.	
18 June 1989	(Iran) Zabol	An-26	YA-BAK	W/O	6/39	Crashed into a hill when attempting to land at Zabol Airport following an in-flight opening of the ramp door. The aircraft was operating a domestic scheduled Kabul–Zaranj passenger service.	
1 August 1992	(Islamic State of Afghanistan) Kabul	Tupolev Tu-154M	YA-TAP	W/O	0/0	Destroyed by a rocket while sitting at Kabul Airport.	
28 August 1992	(Islamic State of Afghanistan) Kabul	An-26	YA-BAN	W/O	Unknown	Destroyed by a rocket while sitting at Kabul Airport.	
11 September 1995	(Islamic State of Afghanistan) Jalalabad	Antonov An-26B	YA-BAO	W/O	3/46	The aircraft was completing a domestic scheduled Kabul–Jalalabad passenger service when it apparently ran out of fuel, crashing on approach to Jalalabad Airport.	
29 October 1997	Jalalabad	Yakovlev Yak-40	YA-KAE	W/O	1	Crashed on landing at Jalalabad Airport.	
19 March 1998	(Afghanistan) Charasyab	Boeing 727-200	YA-FAZ	W/O	45/45	Crashed in bad weather into mountainous terrain on approach to Kabul Airport. It was completing the last leg of an international non-scheduled Sharjah–Kabul–Kandahar passenger service.	
October 2001	(Afghanistan) Kabul	Antonov An-12B	YA-DAA	W/O	0/0	Destroyed during a U.S. bombing raid.	
October 2001	(Afghanistan) Kabul	Antonov An-12BK	YA-DAB	W/O	0/0	Destroyed during a U.S. bombing raid.	
October 2001	(Afghanistan) Kabul	An-24	Unknown	W/O	0/0	Destroyed during a U.S. bombing raid.	
October 2001	(Afghanistan) Kabul	Antonov An-24B	YA-DAH	W/O	0/0	Destroyed during a U.S. bombing raid.	
October 2001	(Afghanistan) Kabul	Antonov An-24RV	YA-DAJ	W/O	0/0	Destroyed during a U.S. bombing raid.	
October 2001	(Afghanistan) Kabul	Boeing 727-100C	YA-FAU	W/O	0/0	Destroyed during a U.S. bombing raid.	
October 2001	(Afghanistan) Kabul	Boeing 727-100C	YA-FAW	W/O	0/0	Destroyed during a U.S. bombing raid.	
23 March 2007	(Turkey) Istanbul	Airbus A300B4-200	YA-BAD	W/O	0	Overran the runway on landing at Istanbul Atatürk Airport.	
8 May 2014	(Afghanistan) Kabul	Boeing 737-4Y0	YA-PIB	W/O	0	Slid off the runway on landing at Kabul Airport.	

== See also ==
- List of government-owned airlines
- Transport in Afghanistan
