= Aerial Distributors =

Aerial Distributors was a US aircraft manufacturer established in Wichita, Kansas in 1967. It set up to develop the Distributor Wing DWA-1, an unorthodox agricultural aircraft.
