= Operation Iron Hand =

Part of the Vietnam War (1965–1973)

Coordinates: 21.391°N 106.250°E

Operation Iron Hand was a joint United States Air Force (USAF) and United States Navy (USN) operation conducted from October 17, 1965 to 1973 during the Vietnam War. It was a type of Suppression of Enemy Air Defenses (SEAD) mission, primarily intended to suppress Soviet-supplied surface-to-air missile (SAM) systems in North Vietnam, although neutralizing radar-directed anti-aircraft artillery (AAA) was important as well. "Iron Hand" refers both to the development of the tactics and equipment, and the numerous individual "Iron Hand missions" that generally accompanied strike packages of the USAF and USN. The "Iron Hand" is a metaphor to the steady hand and nerves of steel it took for pilots to fly directly at the radar-emitting anti-aircraft missile sites while the radar-seeking missiles flew down to destroy the target. The tactics employed on the Iron Hand missions were primarily designed to diminish the threat of SA-2 missiles to a bombing strike force.

== History ==
The People's Army of Vietnam, with the aid of the Soviet Union and China, took defense measures as a response to the American-led Operation Rolling Thunder. On April 5, 1965, a U.S. Navy RF-8A Crusader reconnaissance plane from aircraft carrier USS Coral Sea brought back photography of the first positively identified SAM. Soviet installations had a distinctive six-pointed star arrangement that made them easy to identify, and the installations in Vietnam were being built in the same arrangement. Over the next several months more SAM sites were discovered, but permission to mount strikes on these sites was refused. Not until several American planes had been shot down–-the first Navy losses were VA-23 A-4 Skyhawk aircraft from USS Midway in August—was official sanction was given for anti-SAM missions.

== Operations ==
Operation Iron Hand began on August 12, 1965, but the first actual strike against a SAM site was not accomplished until the morning of October 17. Four A-4E aircraft from USS Independence, with an A-6 Intruder pathfinder, found a site near Kép Air Base, northeast of Hanoi, and destroyed it.

For the Navy, the A-4 and A-3 Skywarrior played pivotal roles during Iron Hand anti-SAM missions; the two aircraft were armed with "beam-riding" AGM-45 Shrike anti-radiation missiles, which could be launched against SAM sites. A typical Iron Hand mission involved an F-8 fighter escorting a slower A-4 ahead of the main Alpha strike force of 20 aircraft and would attempt to eliminate enemy SAM sites; first the A-4 would launch the anti-radar Shrike missile at the SAM site and then the F-8 would strafe the site with 20-millimeter cannon fire. Cluster bombs and rocket fire were both very effective tools against dispersed SAM sites.

A more common application of a Navy Iron Hand mission involved an A-4 Skyhawk or A-6 Intruder, armed with Shrikes, which would fly low-level ("above deck"), detectable by SAM search radar while still having ready access to much lower, radar-free altitudes ("hard deck"). The pilot's avionics would detect a SAM radar's acquisition ("lock") onto his aircraft; the pilot would then dive for the hard deck, choose another approach track, suddenly pitch 15 degrees up without re-entering the SAM radar field ("cone") and launch the Shrike into the cone. The Shrike would then acquire the SAM radar's location, fly to it and destroy it, thus disabling SAM missiles associated with the particular radar, allowing American aircraft to conduct their missions unharassed.

A USAF Iron Hand mission was similar. A group of four fighter/bombers flew in ahead of the strike package to suppress SAMs. One or more would be two-seat F-100F Super Sabre or F-105F Thunderchief Wild Weasels with SAM detection and analysis electronics. Initially, the fighter/bombers had to attack SAM sites with gravity bombs. When F-105F Wild Weasels arrived, they brought the Shrike anti-radiation missile (ARM) for limited stand-off capability. Later, F-105G Wild Weasels could also be armed with the AGM-78 Standard ARM.

== Later years ==
North Vietnamese forces eventually attempted to defeat Iron Hand missions by using SAM radars intermittently or by shutting off the radar entirely if they felt threatened; this worked with the initial iron bomb attacks and with the initial Shrike anti-radiation missile, which could not 'remember' the location of the enemy radar source if the radar was turned off. Later Iron Hand aircraft carried the large, expensive Standard ARM, which was capable of locking in the location of the source even if the radar was turned off.

The AGM-78 Standard ARM as a deterrent for suppression of North Vietnam's AA defenses was noticeably effective. During the course of six months (in 1970) the A-6B(PAT) aircraft, loaded with the AGM-78s, were employed as escorts for various reconnaissance and strike missions. The Iron Hand escorts broadcast their presence and intentions to communications intercept facilities. No ARM missiles were launched on any active AA radars. None of the escorted aircraft were ever taken under fire by any electronically controlled AA systems. None of the escorted aircraft ever sustained any battle damage. Because most of the losses that occurred during the bombing raids into North Vietnam were caused by SAMs, Iron Hand missions continued to be of vital importance throughout the war.
