= American Airlines Flight 383 (1965) =

Aviation accident in the United States

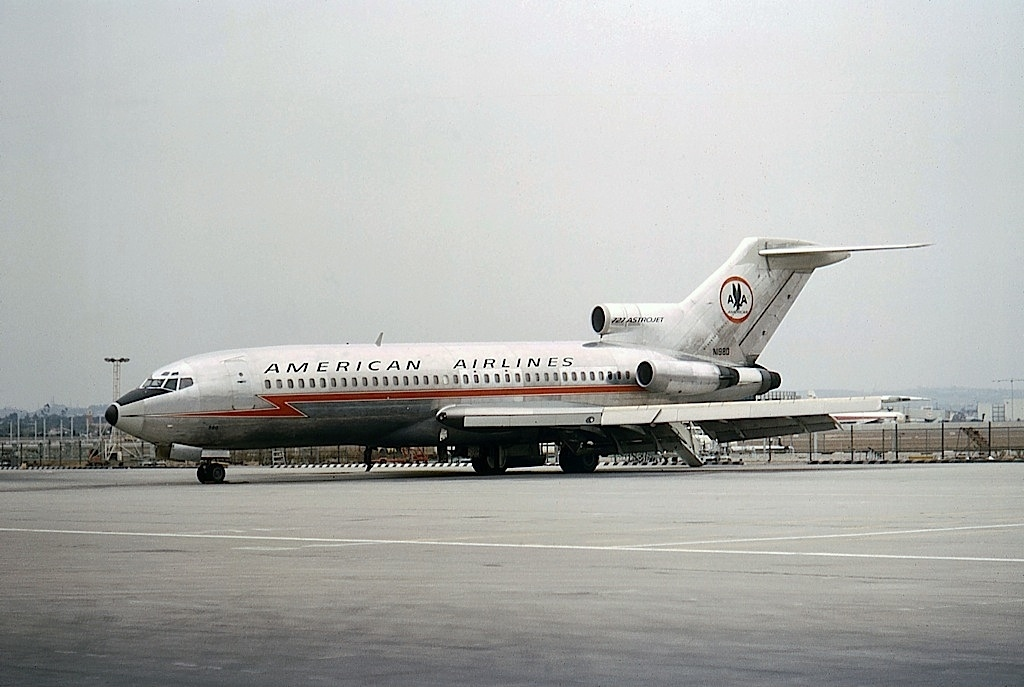
- An American Airlines Boeing 727-23, similar to the one involved.

Accident
- Date: November 8, 1965
- Summary: Controlled flight into terrain
- Site: Hebron, Kentucky, United States; 39°5′11″N 84°39′43″W

Aircraft
- Aircraft type: Boeing 727-23
- Operator: American Airlines
- IATA flight No.: AA383
- ICAO flight No.: AAL383
- Call sign: AMERICAN 383
- Registration: N1996
- Flight origin: LaGuardia Airport, New York City, New York, United States
- Destination: Cincinnati/Northern Kentucky International Airport, Hebron, Kentucky, United States
- Occupants: 62
- Passengers: 57
- Crew: 5
- Fatalities: 58
- Injuries: 4
- Survivors: 4

American Airlines Flight 383 was a nonstop flight from New York City to Cincinnati on November 8, 1965. The aircraft was a Boeing 727, with 57 passengers, and 5 crew on board. The aircraft crashed on final approach to the Cincinnati/Northern Kentucky International Airport located in Hebron, Kentucky, United States. Only three passengers and one flight attendant survived the accident.

== Aircraft ==
The aircraft involved was a Boeing 727-100 (Note: The aircraft was a Boeing 727-100 model; Boeing assigns a unique code for each company that buys one of its aircraft, which is applied as a suffix to the model number at the time the aircraft is built, hence "727-123" designates a 727-100 built for American Airlines (customer code 23).) (registration number N1996), serial number 18901. The Boeing 727 was delivered to American Airlines on June 29, 1965, and had operated a total of 938 hours at the time of the accident.

== Events leading to the crash ==
The flight was delayed for 20 minutes in New York. Captain Daniel Teelin was flying in the right seat as check captain for Captain William O'Neill, who was qualifying on the 727. Until the landing attempt, the flight from New York to Cincinnati was uneventful. At 18:45 (6:45 PM) Eastern Standard Time, the crew contacted the airline via ARINC company radio to report a 19:05 (7:05 PM) estimated time of arrival at Cincinnati. At 18:57 (6:57 PM), Flight 383 was cleared by the approach controller for a visual approach to Cincinnati's runway 18 (now runway 18C), and was advised of precipitation just west of the airport. The aircraft approached the airport from the southeast and turned to a northerly heading to cross the Ohio River. It turned west after crossing to the northern shore of the Ohio River, intending to make a final turn to southeast after crossing the Ohio River (which runs from northwest to southeast) again to the southern shore of the river. After that final turn, the aircraft would line up with the runway 18 of the airport to make the final approach.

At 18:58 (6:58 PM), the approach controller transferred Flight 383 to the Cincinnati tower frequency. At 18:59 (6:59 PM), Flight 383 received clearance from the tower controller to land on runway 18.

== Accident ==
The aircraft flew into thick clouds and a thunderstorm after flying toward the airport from the northwest. It descended more rapidly than it should have, without either pilot in the cockpit noticing. The airport is situated at an elevation of 853 feet (260 m) and the aircraft had descended to the level of 553 ft (169 m) above the airport while it was still about 5 miles (8.0 km) northeast of the airport. It descended to just 3 ft (per altimeter) above the airport while it was about 3 nm north of the airport. Its correct altitude should have been just below 1,000 ft (300 m) at that time. It continued its descent into the Ohio River valley while crossing the river back to the southern shore. When it made its last turn to the southeast to line up with the runway, it flew into the wooded slopes of the valley 3 km north of the runway threshold in poor visibility, at an altitude of 225′ below the runway's elevation. It then exploded and was engulfed in flames.

Of the 62 people on board the aircraft, only four people (one flight attendant and three passengers) survived. One of the survivors was Israel Horowitz, an American record producer. Another was a deadheading American Airlines captain, Elmer Weekly, who later testified at the accident hearings.

== Investigation ==
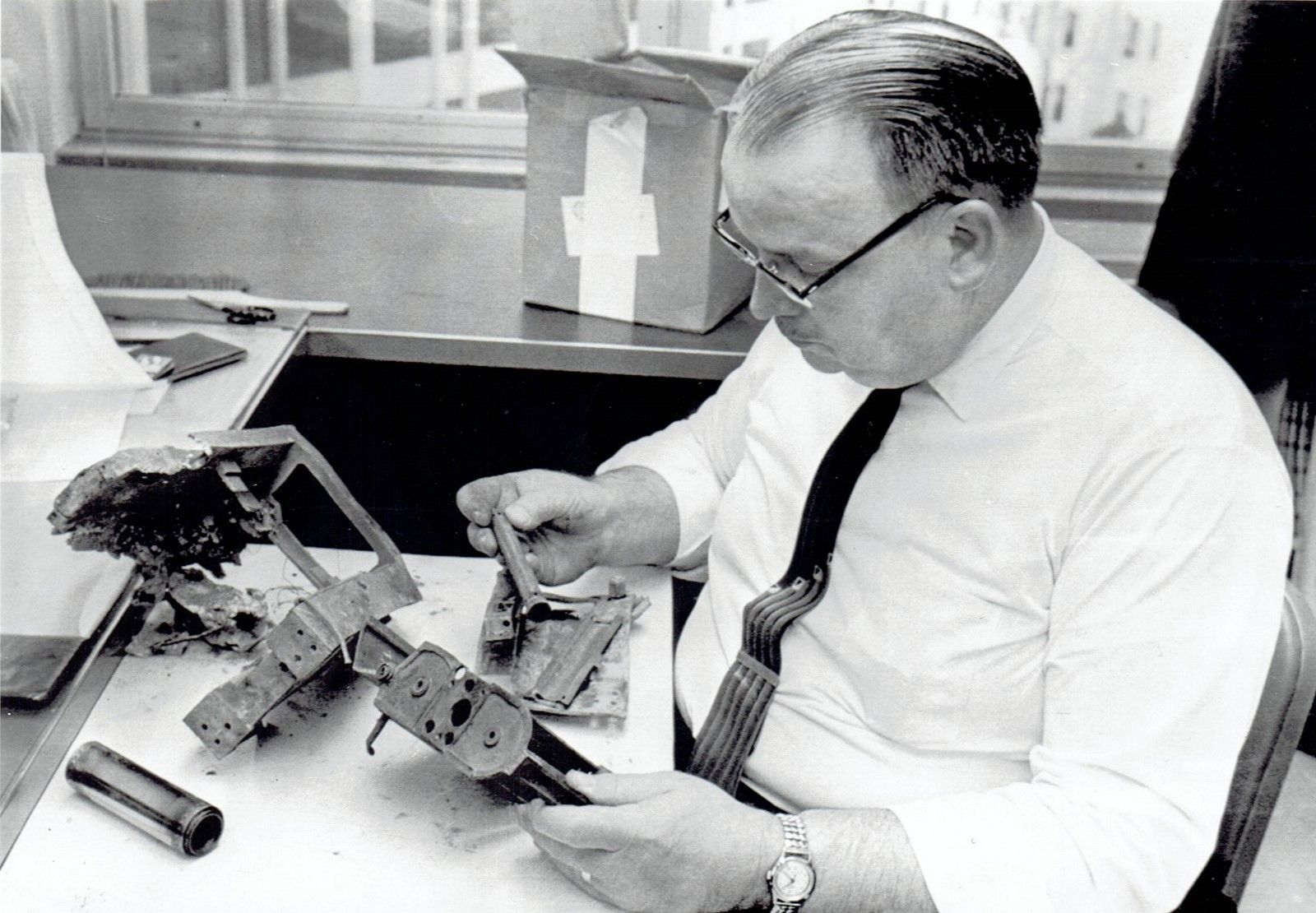
CAB engineer examines the flight recorder of American Airlines Flight 383

The Civil Aeronautics Board (CAB) investigated the accident. CAB investigators concluded that the aircraft was working normally and fully under the control of the pilots at the time of the crash. The aircraft was not equipped with a cockpit voice recorder. The flight data recorder showed the aircraft descended through 500 feet (150 m) in the last 42 seconds before impact, a normal rate of descent for the landing phase of operation. The CAB determined that the probable cause of the accident was the pilots' failure to properly monitor their altitude during a visual approach into deteriorating weather conditions.

It was later believed that the following factors might have contributed to the crash:

- Lights from the houses in the Ohio River valley, located 400 feet (120 m) below the altitude of the airport, may have conveyed an illusion of runway lights.
- The flight crew may have been confused about their true altitude, due to misinterpretation of the aircraft's drum-type altimeter after descending through 0 feet (relative to the airport altitude), or they may have had their hands full controlling the plane in severe weather and simply failed to notice the readings on the altimeter.
- A late departure from New York and the deteriorating weather at Cincinnati may have put pressure on the flight crew.
- Despite the rapidly deteriorating weather conditions, the flight crew chose to make a visual approach to the runway.

== Aftermath ==
The estate of Samuel Creasy, one of the passengers who died aboard Flight 383, sued American Airlines for wrongful death. American Airlines responded by filing a third-party complaint against the Federal Aviation Administration and the Weather Bureau, in an attempt to shift liability for the crash to meteorologists and air traffic controllers for failure to warn the pilots of inclement weather or revoke the visual approach clearance. American Airlines also alleged that the accident was due to a downdraft rather than pilot error. A jury found AA liable for the accident and awarded Creasy's family $175,000 plus funeral expenses, a decision that was upheld on appeal to the Fifth Circuit Court of Appeals.

Two years after the crash of Flight 383, TWA Flight 128 crashed on the same hill while on approach to Cincinnati under poor visibility conditions.

On December 13, 2017, Toni Ketchell, the surviving crew member, died.

== See also ==
- 1961 Cincinnati Zantop DC-4 crash
- American Airlines Flight 1420
- Alitalia Flight 404
- American Airlines Flight 383 (2016)
- American Airlines Flight 965
- Ariana Afghan Airlines Flight 701
- Aviation safety
- South African Airways Flight 228 (pilot error reading a drum-type altimeter on a Boeing 707)
- TWA Flight 128, a Convair 880 that crashed near Flight 383's site
