= Kwun Tong Tsai Bay =

Bay in Hong Kong

Coordinates: 22.297°N 114.234°E

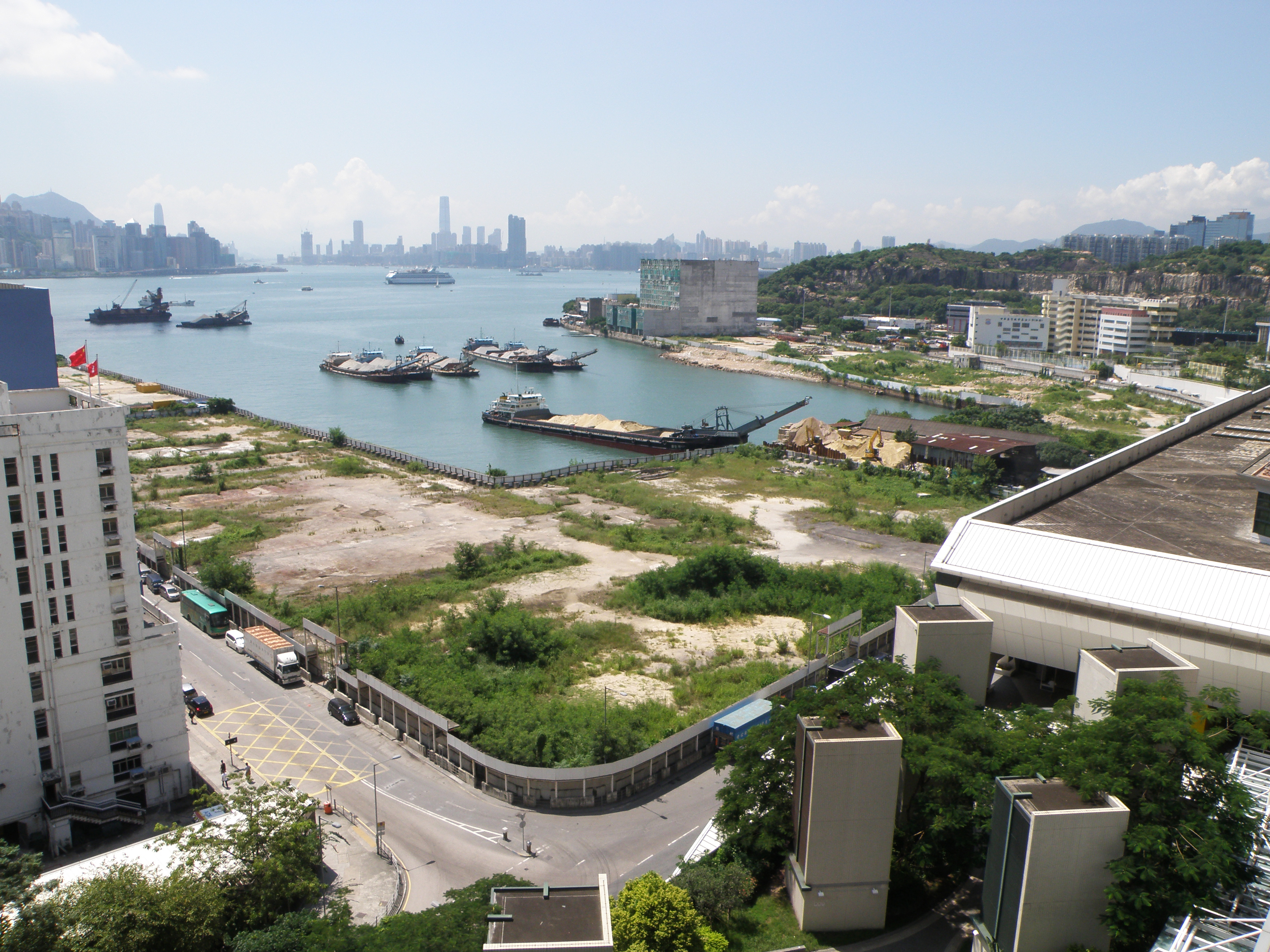
View towards Kwun Tong Tsai Bay in September 2015

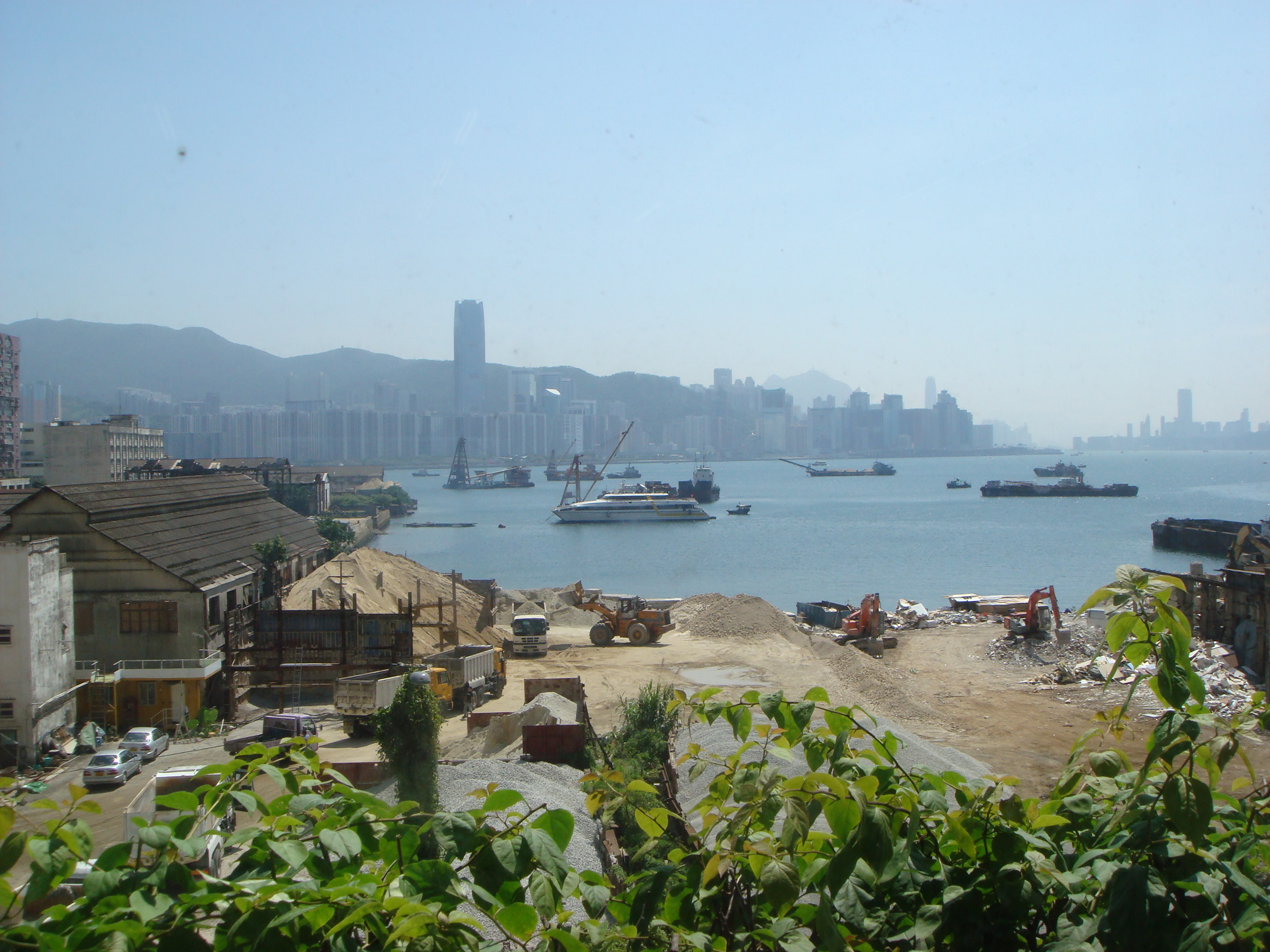
View from MTR Yau Tong station to Kwun Tong Tsai Bay in 2010

Kwun Tong Tsai Bay (Chinese: 觀塘仔灣), or Yau Tong Bay (油塘灣), is a bay in Yau Tong, Kowloon, Hong Kong, situated between Kai Tsz Shan and Ling Nam San Tsuen and nearby Cha Kwo Ling and opposite to Aldrich Bay in Shau Kei Wan.

Since the 1960s, Yau Tong has been developed into a public housing area and an industrial area.

In late 1990s, Kwun Tong Tsai Bay was proposed to be reclaimed for development of private housing estates. But in response to strong opposition from the public, the proposal was turned down and replaced by decommissioning of shipyards around the Bay.
