= Aerial Distributors Distributor Wing =

American agricultural aircraft prototype

DW-1
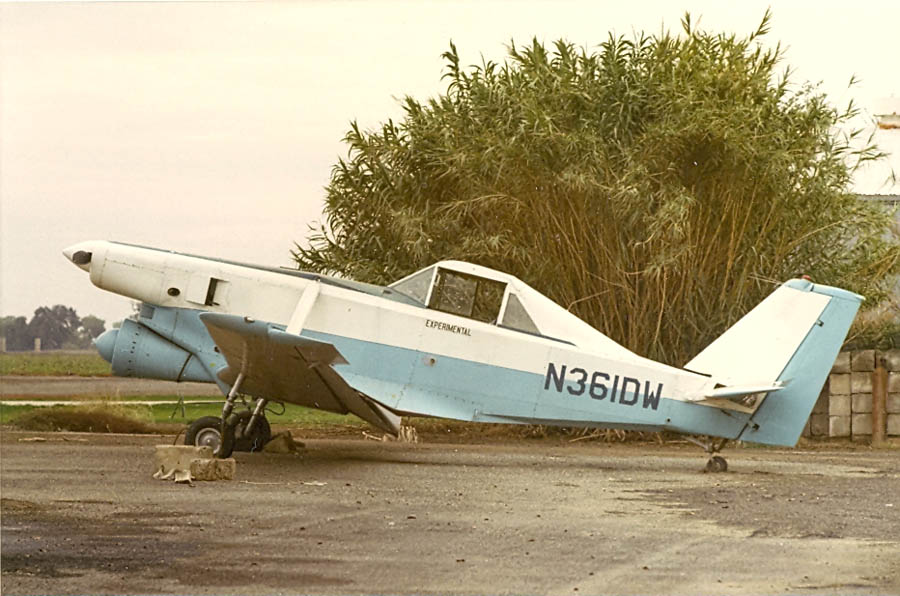

General information
- Type: Agricultural aircraft
- Manufacturer: Aerial Distributors
- Designer: Ken Razak

History
- First flight: 30 January 1965

The Distributor Wing DW-1 was a prototype agricultural aircraft of unorthodox design, designed by Ken Razak in the United States and marketed by Aerial Distributors in the 1960s.

== Design ==
Developed with assistance from NASA, the University of Wichita and the University of Robbins, California, the aircraft was unusual in that it had a second engine mounted directly below its main powerplant, using this second motor to power a distribution system that used compressed air to carry dry chemicals from a hopper and blow them out of the trailing edges of its wings, over the flaps. Varying the power of this blower engine also provided lift control.

== Flight testing and cancellation ==
First flown on January 30, 1965, the DW-1 was flight tested over several years, with the cowling being revised during testing. Development was terminated by economic conditions in the fertilizer market.

== Specifications (Production DW-1) ==
Data from

General characteristics

- Crew: 1
- Capacity: 39.9 cubic feet (1.13 m^{3}) hopper capacity
- Length: 28 ft 4 in (8.64 m)
- Wingspan: 43 ft 10 in (13.36 m)
- Height: 8 ft 2 in (2.49 m) to top of canopy
- Wing area: 240 sq ft (22 m^{2})
- Max takeoff weight: 5,200 lb (2,359 kg)
- Fuel capacity: 60 US gallons (230 L; 50 imp gal)
- Powerplant: 1 × Lycoming IGO-540 six-cylinder horizontally opposed piston engine, 350 hp (260 kW)
- Powerplant: 1 × Lycoming O-235 four-cylinder horizontally opposed piston engine, 108 hp (81 kW) powering spraying and dusting gear
- Propellers: 3-bladed Hartzell Propeller variable-pitch, 8 ft 8 in (2.64 m) diameter

Performance

- Cruise speed: 150 kn (170 mph, 280 km/h)
- Stall speed: 40 kn (46 mph, 74 km/h) empty
- Rate of climb: 350 ft/min (1.8 m/s)

== See also ==
Aircraft of comparable role, configuration, and era

- Ayres Thrush
- Cessna 188
- Grumman Ag-Cat
- PAC Fletcher
- PZL-106 Kruk
- Transavia PL-12 Airtruk
- Zlin Z-37 Cmelak

Related lists

- List of agricultural aircraft
