= Israel Horowitz (producer) =

- Born: September 6, 1916; New York, U.S.
- Died: December 26, 2008 (aged 92); Closter, New Jersey, U.S.
- Genres: Classical music
- Occupation(s): Producer, editor, columnist
- Labels: Decca Records

Israel Horowitz (September 6, 1916 – December 26, 2008) was an American record producer who became an editor and columnist on classical music at Billboard magazine.

Horowitz was born in New York City on September 6, 1916. He attended the Juilliard School where he studied the violin. He was drafted in 1943 into the United States Army Air Forces, where he was an ordnance technician. His commanding officer had him write a history of his battalion after having seen the quality of his writing while censoring his mail. He remained in the Army Air Forces as a writer and historian until 1947.

After leaving military service, he was hired as a reporter by Billboard in 1948, where he first covered the coin-operated machine beat and moved on to cover music.

He was hired by Decca Records in 1956. When Horowitz was hired by Decca, the label had not been producing classical music, and it was Horowitz's efforts that enabled Decca to compete with Columbia Records and RCA Records. He served as director of classical artists and repertory from 1958 to 1971. In this role he produced recordings by organist Virgil Fox, violinists Erica Morini and Ruggiero Ricci, conductor Leopold Stokowski, New York Pro Musica and classical guitarist Andrés Segovia.

Some of Horowitz's best known recording were the works he did with Segovia at Decca and as an independent producer. The albums they produced included lute and vihuela pieces, as well as original works written for Segovia by Mario Castelnuovo-Tedesco, Manuel María Ponce and Alexandre Tansman. Segovia won the Grammy Award for Best Instrumental Soloist Performance (without orchestra) at the Grammy Awards of 1959 for the Golden Jubilee album they worked on.

Segovia and Horowitz also collaborated on The Guitar and I, which was to include records with music on one side and autobiographical material on the other. The pair had produced the first two volumes in the planned series by 1971, when Decca ended its production of classical recordings.

He returned to Billboard in 1973, serving variously as the publication's New York bureau chief, classical music editor and executive editor. After retiring from his editing responsibilities in the 1980s, he continued to write Keeping Score, a weekly column covering classical music until the early 1990s. After his retirement in 1994, Timothy White, then editor-in-chief at Billboard described Horowitz as "one of the most distinguished and admired figures in the music industry, but also one of its modern architects, helping pioneer contemporary music journalism and criticism, as well as playing a consummate role as A&R executive and astute producer of some of the foremost classical artists of our era. Horowitz exemplifies the finest aspects of journalism and the arts.

He was one of four survivors of American Airlines Flight 383 that crashed on approach to the Greater Cincinnati Airport on November 8, 1965, with 62 people on board.

Horowitz died at age 92 on December 26, 2008, at his home in Closter, New Jersey. He was survived by his wife of 62 years, Mildred Horowitz, and two sons Robert, of Manhattan, New York, and Michael, of Bern, Switzerland.
