= Shenzhen Cultural Center =

Cultural Center in Shenzhen, China

Coordinates: 22°33′0″N 114°3′7″E

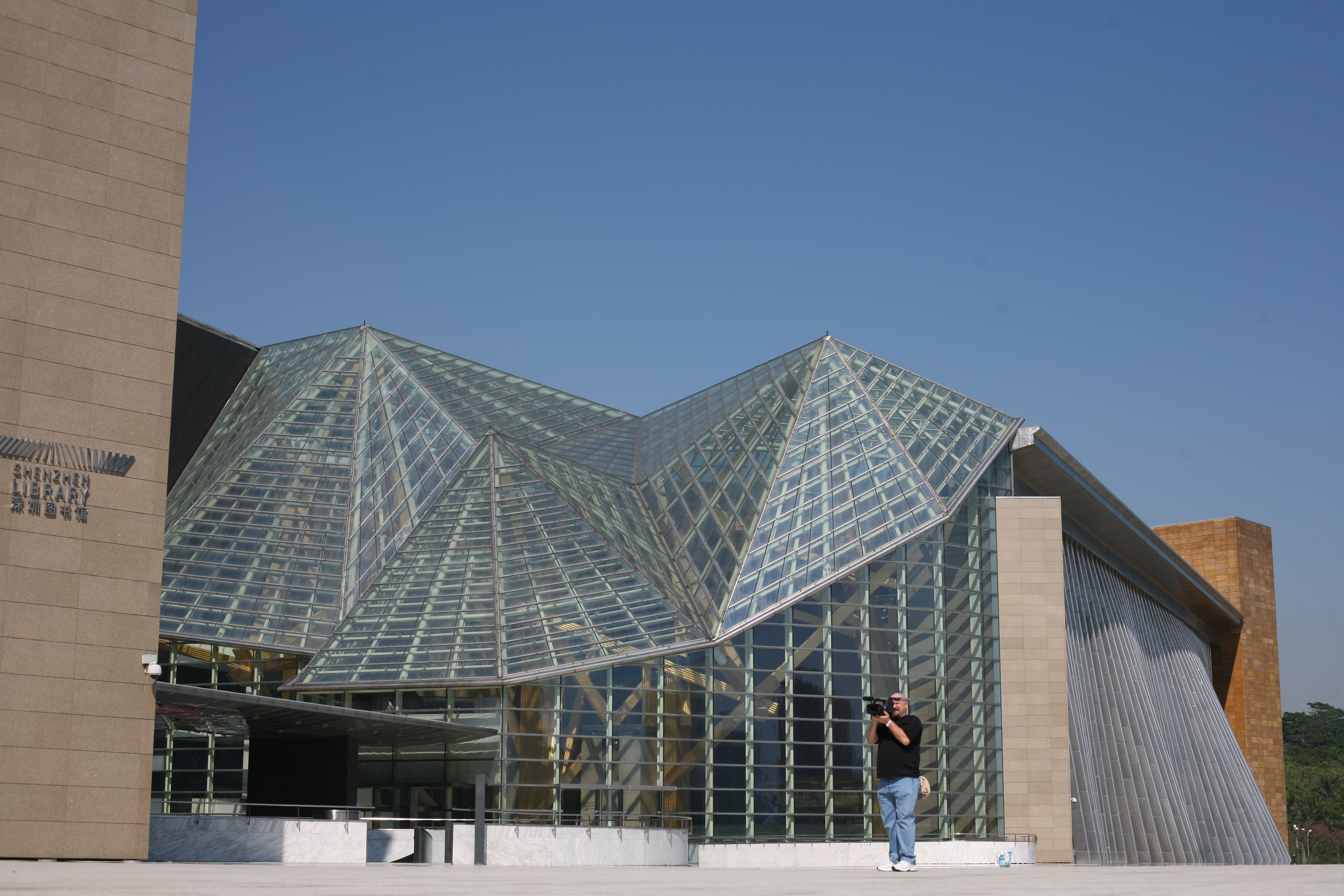
Shenzhen Concert Hall in Shenzhen

Shenzhen Cultural Center includes Shenzhen Concert Hall and Shenzhen Library and is located in the Futian district of Shenzhen, Guangdong, China. It was designed by Japanese architect Arata Isozaki. The vineyard-style concert hall seats 1800 and was opened in 2007.

It is located adjacent to the Shenzhen library and near Shenzhen civic center and Children's palace (少年宫) line 3 subway station. It is one of the two main concert venues in Shenzhen, the other being Nanshan cultural center (南山文体中心剧院).

The Belt and Road International Music Festival was inaugurated at Shenzhen concert hall in 2019. During the three week long music festival, a number of music concerts were held around the city including at the concert hall.

Other concert halls in Shenzhen include Shenzhen Polytheater (Nanshan) (深圳保利剧院).
