= APEC China 2026 =

APEC annual meeting

APEC 2026 China

- Host country: China
- Date: 18–19 November 2026
- Motto: Building an Asia-Pacific Community to Prosper Together (Chinese: 建设亚太共同体，促进共同繁荣)
- Venues: Main venue Shenzhen
- Follows: APEC South Korea 2025
- Precedes: APEC Vietnam 2027
- Website: apec2026.cn

The APEC China 2026 was a year-long hosting of the Asia-Pacific Economic Cooperation (APEC) meetings, which concluded with the APEC Economic Leaders' Meeting in November 2026. It will be the third time China hosted the summit, having previously hosted in 2001 and 2014. The sidelines of the meeting featured an unprecedented China–Russia–U.S. Summit, which was issued by a joint statement. Following the conclusion of the APEC summit, the member countries issued the "Shenzhen Outlook" declaration.

== Background ==
In November 2024, during APEC Peru, it was announced that China would host the APEC meeting in 2026. The announcement was made by Chinese leader Xi Jinping in a speech titled "Shouldering the Responsibilities of Our Times Together and Promoting Asia-Pacific Development Together", in which he thanked Peruvian president Dina Boluarte. Previously, Boluarte visited China, where she invited Xi to the APEC summit to be held in Peru.

On 1 November 2025, Xi Jinping announced that the 2026 APEC leaders' summit would be held in Shenzhen, which is a special economic zone in the province of Guangdong. Shenzhen is directly adjacent to fellow APEC member Hong Kong, which has never hosted the summit in its own right. Hong Kong Chief Executive John Lee Ka-chiu said he would fully support Shenzhen in hosting the APEC summit. On 12 December 2025, Guo Jiakun, spokesperson for the Ministry of Foreign Affairs of China, announced at a regular press conference that the 2026 APEC Economic Leaders' Meeting held in Shenzhen on 17–18 November 2026.

On 14 November 2026, Wang Xi, deputy head of the provincial preparatory leading group and head of the United Front Work Department of the Guangdong Provincial Committee of the Chinese Communist Party, told in a press conference that that the preparations for the Leaders' Meeting were ready, stating that Guangdong would offer 218 visitor sites and 43 routes, including two representative ones in Shenzhen, while Shenzhen Mayor Li Yun stated all venues and facilities were ready. Wang said that various digital technologies including smart navigation, AI-assisted translation, digital customs clearance and intelligent scheduling were put into use for better logistics and reception services during the summit.

== Preparations ==
APEC China 2026 sign in front of the Shenzhen Art Museum

The APEC leaders' meeting is scheduled to be held at the Shenzhen International Exchange Center in the Xiangmihu area of Futian, Shenzhen. The center was designed by Chinese architect He Jingtang's team. The exterior of the building uses traditional Lingnan window lattice elements. It has a conference center and supporting hotel. The main venue covers an area of about 5,000 square meters. Around 2,000 participants from politics, business, media and other sectors are expected to attend the event. It was announced that the theme of the meeting would be "Building an Asia-Pacific Community to Prosper Together", (Note: Chinese: 建设亚太共同体，促进共同繁荣; pinyin: Jiànshè yàtài gòngtóngtǐ, cùjìn gòngtóng fánróng) focusing on three priority areas: openness, innovation and cooperation. The agenda would the Free Trade Area of the Asia-Pacific, connectivity, artificial intelligence and the digital economy.

=== APEC "China Year" ===
The APEC "China Year" held about 300 events, including the CEO Summit, the Foreign and Trade Ministers' Meeting, and other events. In December 2025, an informal senior officials' meeting was held in Shenzhen to clarify the cooperation theme for the 2026 APEC meeting, plan priority areas for cooperation, and finalize the meeting schedule for the whole year. In February, May and August 2026, three senior officials' meetings were held in Guangzhou, Shanghai and Dalian respectively. Starting in May, about 10 professional ministerial meetings or high-level events were held, including the trade ministers' meeting in Suzhou in May, ministerial meeting on food security Hangzhou in August, energy ministers' meeting in Beijing in September, finance ministers' meeting in Hong Kong in September, and other meetings in other places. The Business Leaders Summit will be held in Shenzhen from 17–18 November.

Russian president Vladimir Putin speaking at the APEC CEO Summit, 18 November 2026

The APEC CEO Summit was held in Shenzhen from November 17 to 18. It was hosted under the theme of "To Prosper and Win the Future Together" by the China Council for the Promotion of International Trade (CCPRIT). Wang Wenshuai, a spokeswoman for the CCPRIT, previously said business representatives from all APEC members, as well as companies from several non-APEC members such as France, Germany, Switzerland and the United Kingdom, would attend the event. Xi Jinping addressed the summit on the morning of 18 November, where he called for the elimination of trade barriers, technological partnerships and giving importance to the World Trade Organization. Malaysian prime minister Anwar Ibrahim gave a speech praising China, while saying "You can't say in one voice [that you're] promoting trade and investment, but only to your country", which was considered a rebuke to the United States. Russian president Vladimir Putin gave a speech saying efforts to contain Russia only hurts Western countries and said Europe was in "humiliating decline", and advocated for a "larger Eurasian partnership", while pitching Russia as an attractive investment destination. He praised Shenzhen as a "modern vibrant megacity", and said the region was creating a "more fair, democratic and equal world order". Canadian prime minister Mark Carney said Canada was ready to take "practical steps" on financial cooperation with China, and praised China for its development of Shenzhen, saying "The choices that built this city will lift this whole region". Thai prime minister Anutin Charnvirakul said Chinese premier Li Qiang had "kept telling me the story of Shenzhen" on the city's quick development, and he said he interpreted the city as an example of how "transformation can be achieved where an economy opens itself up". Australian prime minister Anthony Albanese said he talked to Xi about his first visit to Shenzhen in 1998, and added "You don't think of it as a same place". South Korean president Lee Jae Myung said "We must ensure that the benefits of the AI revolution translate into innovation for all. And we must cooperate more closely on building resilient industrial foundations and stable supply chains".

On December 12, 2025, the logo of the 2026 APEC "China Year" was released. The logo is based on the design of the Kunpeng, which is composed of 21 intertwined wings forming the shape of a roc spreading its wings and flying high. It also closely matches the nickname of the host city Shenzhen, "Pengcheng". On February 10, 2026, the official website for the 2026 APEC "China Year" was launched. On February 27, in order to welcome the APEC summit, Shenzhen held the launching ceremony of the "APEC 'China Year'·Shenzhen in Progress" series of themed publicity. On November 1, 2026, the theme song of the host city of APEC "China Year", "Meeting You in the City of Miracles", (Note: Chinese: 在奇迹之城遇见你; pinyin: Zài qíjì zhī chéng yùjiàn nǐ) was released and sung by Jane Zhang and Zeng Shunxi.

=== Security measures ===
Police presence has increased in the area in preparation of the summit, while community staff visited residential compounds to register individuals' information. The South China Morning Post reported that residents living in buildings adjacent to APEC venues were ordered to close all windows facing the buildings and were offered subsidies to go to hotels during the summit period, with a police officer or security guard being stationed inside the houses of those who seek to stay. On November 1, 2026, the Guangdong Provincial Public Security Department held a mobilization meeting for the APEC meeting security of public security organs throughout the province. The meeting required that, starting immediately, public security organs throughout the province should fully enter the decisive stage of APEC meeting security, launch high-level duty, ensure that the main leaders at all levels and the heads of the main police departments are on duty throughout the meeting, and increase the investment of police force. It also required strengthening patrol control, protection of key areas, and control of logistics and delivery and dangerous explosive materials, and strengthening the control of drone no-fly zone, and severely cracking down on "black flight" and illegal assembly and hacking.

On November 3, the Shenzhen Municipal People's Government issued a notice that from November 7 to November 10, drones, helicopters and kites, sky lanterns and other airborne objects are prohibited from flying in Futian and Nanshan districts; from November 11 to November 21, the no-fly zone is expanded to the entire city of Shenzhen (excluding the Shenzhen-Shantou Special Cooperation Zone). In addition, passenger cars, trucks and dangerous goods transport vehicles with license plates prefixes other than 粤B (i.e. non-Shenzhen registered vehicles) will be subject to different levels of time and area restrictions during the conference. From November 17 to 19 during the conference, temporary traffic control will be implemented on some roads in Shenzhen. The towns of Wanqingsha and Longxue in Nansha District of Guangzhou, which are adjacent to Shenzhen, the entire area of 7 towns in Dongguan, Lisha Island in Shatin Town, Huiyang District and Daya Bay Economic and Technological Development Zone of Huizhou, Xiangzhou District, High-tech Zone and Wanshan District of Zhuhai, as well as Torch High-tech Industrial Development Zone, Cuiheng New Area and Minzhong Street of Zhongshan will also take measures to prohibit aircraft and airborne objects from November 11 to November 21. The Civil Aviation Authority of Macau also decided to ban all flight activities in the airspace of Macau from November 11 to November 22. The ban does not include public commercial air transport, police drones performing emergency rescue and police operations.

On November 1, 2026, the Guangdong Provincial Postal Administration issued an announcement stating that relevant departments in Guangdong and Shenzhen would organize temporary security management measures for mail and express parcels sent to Shenzhen from November 1 to 22, including implementing "machine security checks" or other necessary security inspection procedures for mail and express parcels. On November 9, 2026, Zhongshan Public Transport Group announced that the number of buses on the Shenzhen-Zhongshan intercity bus lines T01A, T01B and T01C would be reduced from November 10 to November 20. Passengers who purchased multiple tickets online or offline were required to provide identification documents for real-name registration. From November 17 to 20, the transportation and setting off of fireworks and firecrackers were prohibited throughout Guangdong Province. As a result, the fireworks effects of the "Blue Miracle Fireworks Show" at Chimelong Ocean Kingdom in Zhuhai were cancelled.

=== Supporting policies ===
APEC themed green plants at Lianhuashan Park, Shenzhen

As part of preparations for the summit, Shenzhen city authorities have implemented stricter regulations on electric scooters, including expanded restrictions in pedestrian areas, designated parking systems and fines of up to ¥2000 to enhance traffic management and urban order ahead of the summit. Meituan announced that food delivery workers in Shenzhen would be exempt from penalties for late deliveries, as well as penalties for order cancellations for traffic disruptions and special circumstances in Luohu, Futian and Nanshan.

On October 15, 2026, the Shenzhen Municipal People's Government held a press conference to announce that there would be no holiday during the APEC meeting (November 16 to 20), but it advocated that enterprises implement flexible work arrangements. It said that enterprises with the necessary conditions should arrange for employees to work remotely from home, and employees in positions that require on-site work should be encouraged to stagger their work hours and work flexibly. In response, at least 50 local companies, including Honor, Insta360 and Ping An Insurance, introduced flexible policies including allowing employees to work from home or take time off. Additionally, 90 percent of official vehicles would be banned from roads, while Shenzhen encouraged citizens to voluntarily declare that they would stop driving their private cars and reduce their use of private cars. Citizens who voluntarily declare and stop driving their private cars will receive a commemorative Shenzhen Tong card and a special commemorative car sticker. During the APEC meeting, Shenzhen's public transportation and subway will implement a 50% discount and increase capacity. As of November 17, more than 1.5 million local car owners signed up for the scheme.

APEC Business Travel Card holders will be subject to new arrangements for their stay in China starting November 1, 2026. Under the new arrangements, the maximum stay for eligible holders in China will increase from 60 days to 90 days per visit.

=== Sanae Takaichi's attendance ===
Chinese leader Xi Jinping and his wife Peng Liyuan taking a photo with Japanese prime minister Sanae Takaichi during the APEC welcoming ceremony, 18 November 2026

In November 2025, Japanese prime minister Sanae Takaichi stated during a debate in the House of Representatives that China's use of force against Taiwan could constitute a "crisis situation for Japan's survival", with the remarks triggering a diplomatic dispute between China and Japan. As China is the host of the 2026 APEC Leaders ' Informal Meeting, whether Takaichi could meet with Chinese leaders attracted attention.

In May 2026, Japanese Minister of Economy, Trade and Industry Ryosei Akazawa had a brief conversation with Chinese Minister of Commerce Wang Wentao during the APEC Trade Ministers' Meeting in Suzhou. In September 2026, the Japanese government sought to arrange a meeting between Takaichi and Xi during the Shenzhen Summit, but the two sides failed to reach an agreement on the meeting arrangements. In November 2026, Kyodo News reported that China still refused to hold a formal summit meeting, while Japan sought to arrange a brief contact between the two leaders during the meeting.

On 13 November 2026, the Japanese government announced that Takaichi would attend the summit from 18 to 19 November. On 18 November, Takaichi arrived in Shenzhen and was greeted by protocol ambassador Zhang Qiyue and Japanese ambassador to China Kenji Kanasugi. Some media compared her reception with that of other leaders attending the summit and believed that there were differences. Takaichi and Xi later shook hands at the APEC welcome reception.

== Participating leaders ==
This was the first APEC Economic Leaders' Meeting (AELM) attended by José Antonio Kast, Claudia Sheinbaum, and Keiko Fujimori, as Kast and Fujimori won their respective elections in 2026, while Sheinbaum rarely travels abroad since winning the 2024 Mexican general election. It was also Donald Trump's first in-person attendance at an AELM in his second presidency, and first since 2017, as well as James Marape's first AELM since 2023, with Papua New Guinea being represented by deputy prime minister John Rosso in the last two AELMs.

Australia
Anthony Albanese,
Prime Minister

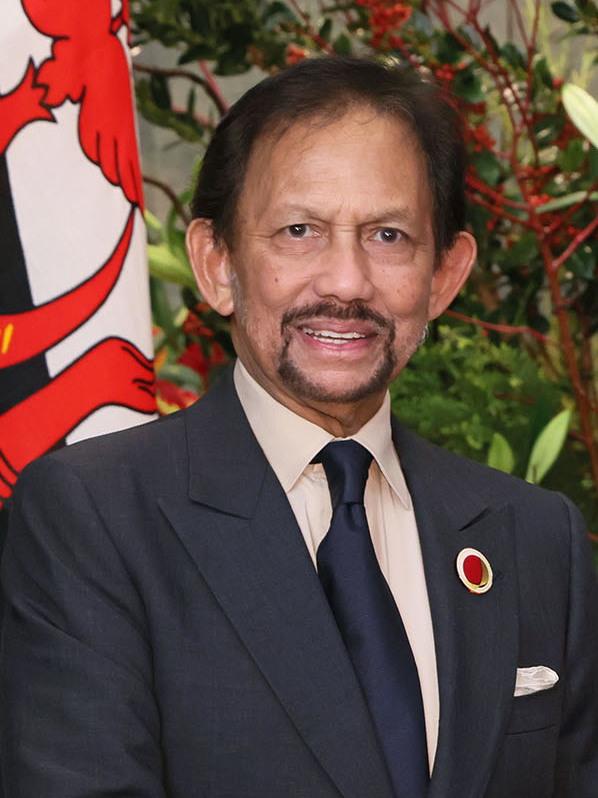
Brunei
Hassanal Bolkiah,
Sultan

Canada
Mark Carney,
Prime Minister

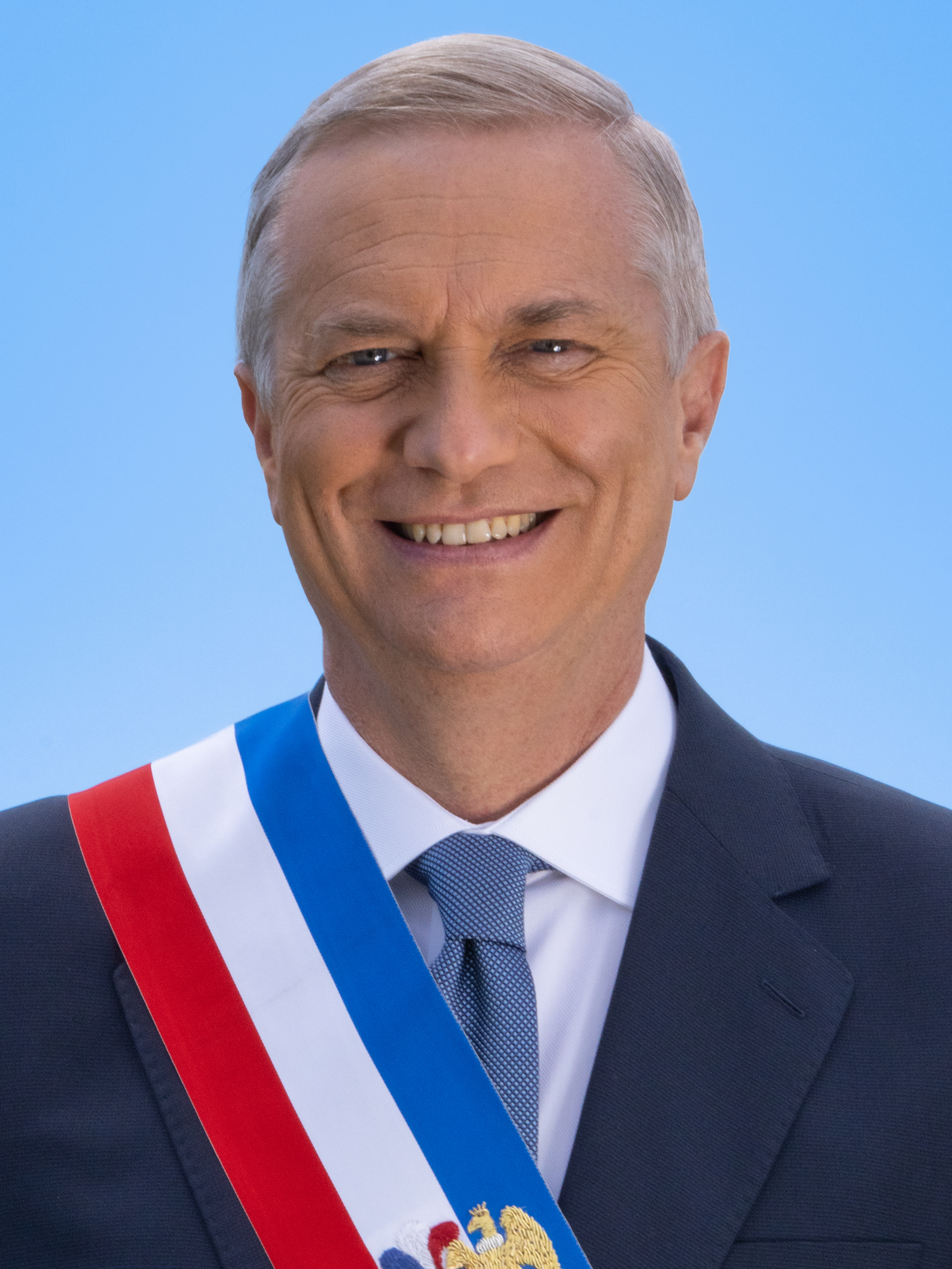
Chile
José Antonio Kast,
President

China
Xi Jinping,
CCP General Secretary and President (Note: The president of China is legally a ceremonial office, but the general secretary of the Chinese Communist Party (de facto leader in one-party communist state) has always held this office since 1993 except for the months of transition.) (Host)

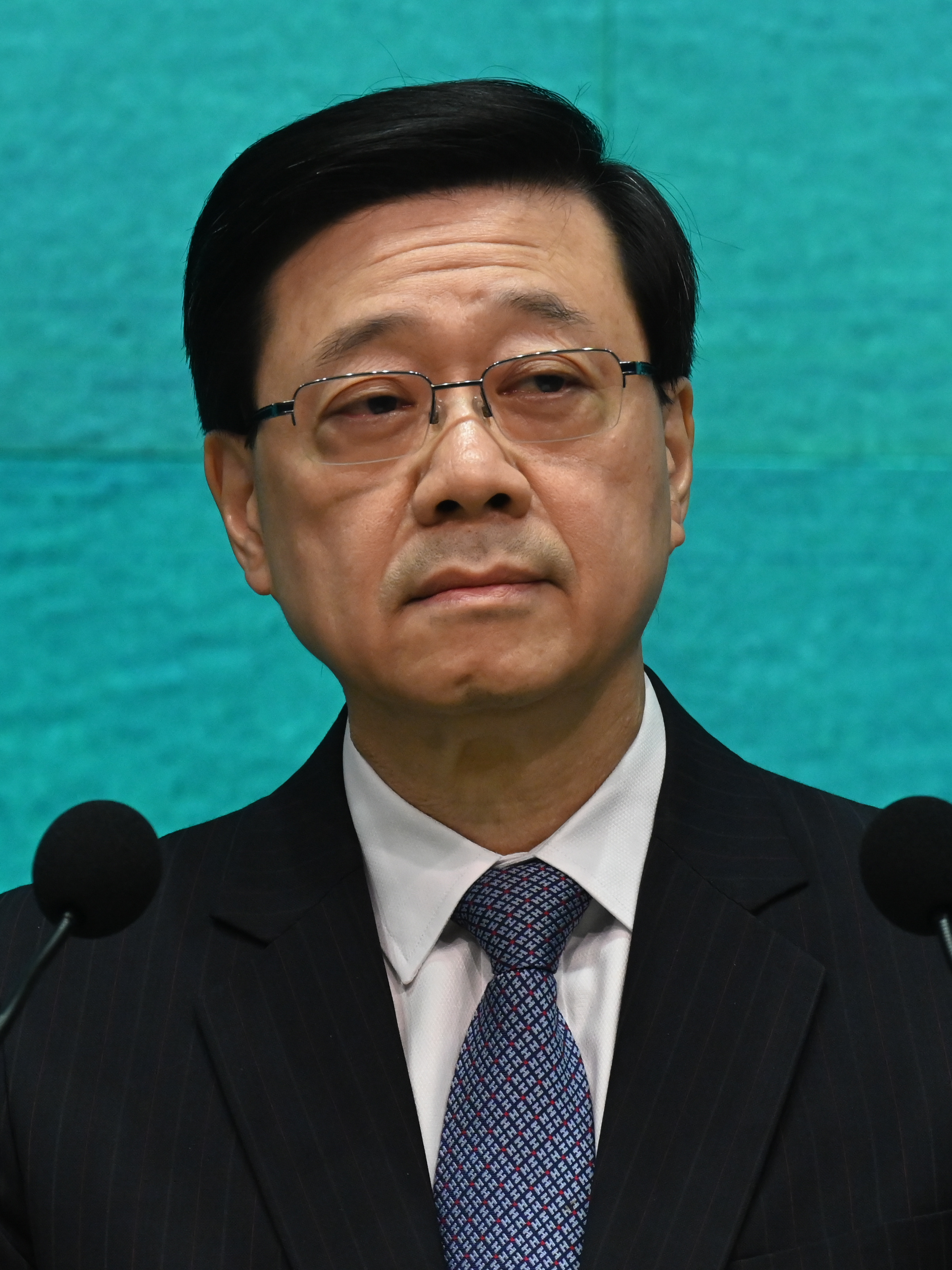
Hong Kong
John Lee,
Chief Executive

Indonesia
Prabowo Subianto,
President

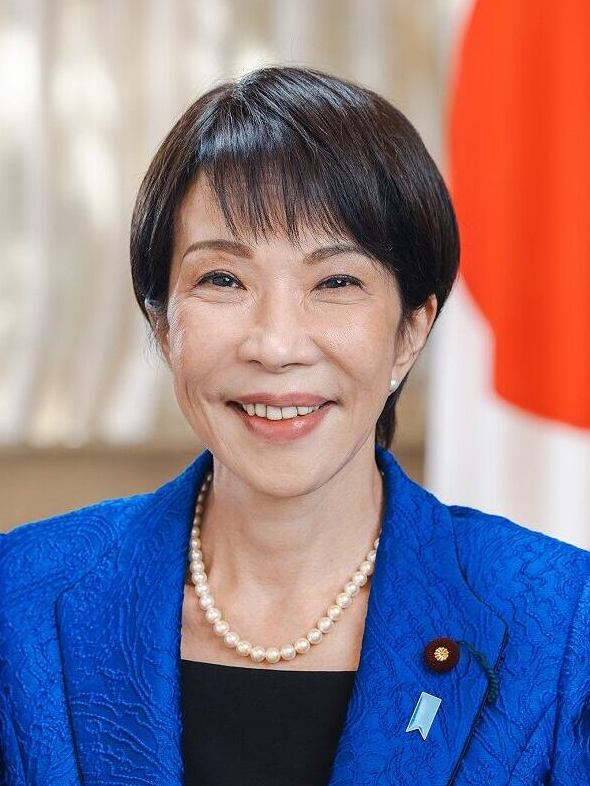
Japan
Sanae Takaichi,
Prime Minister

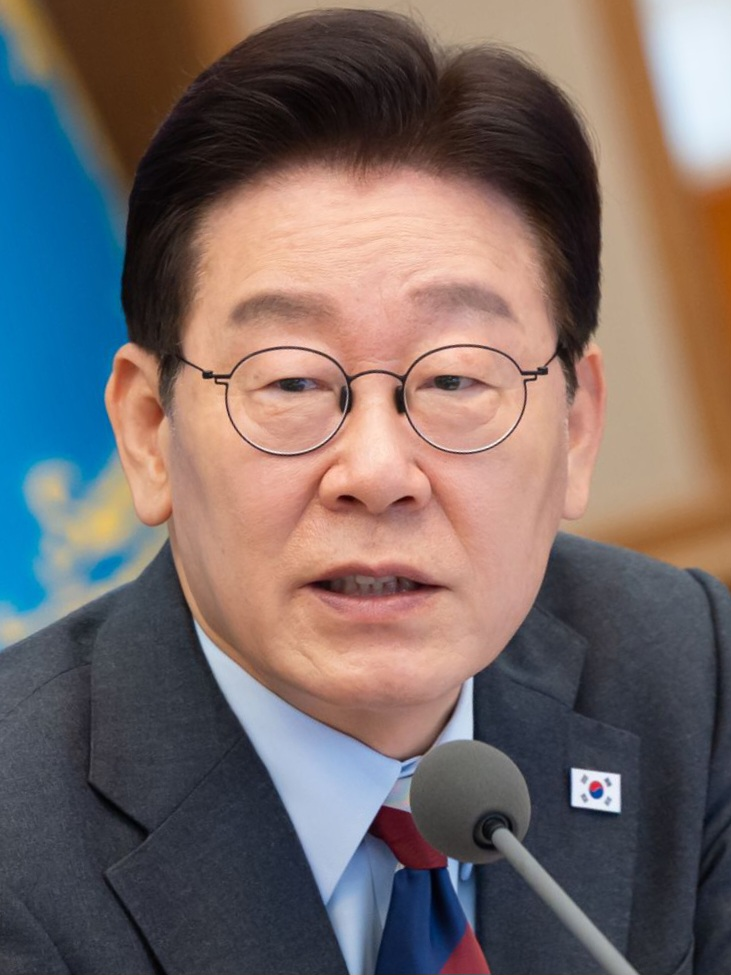
South Korea
Lee Jae Myung,
President

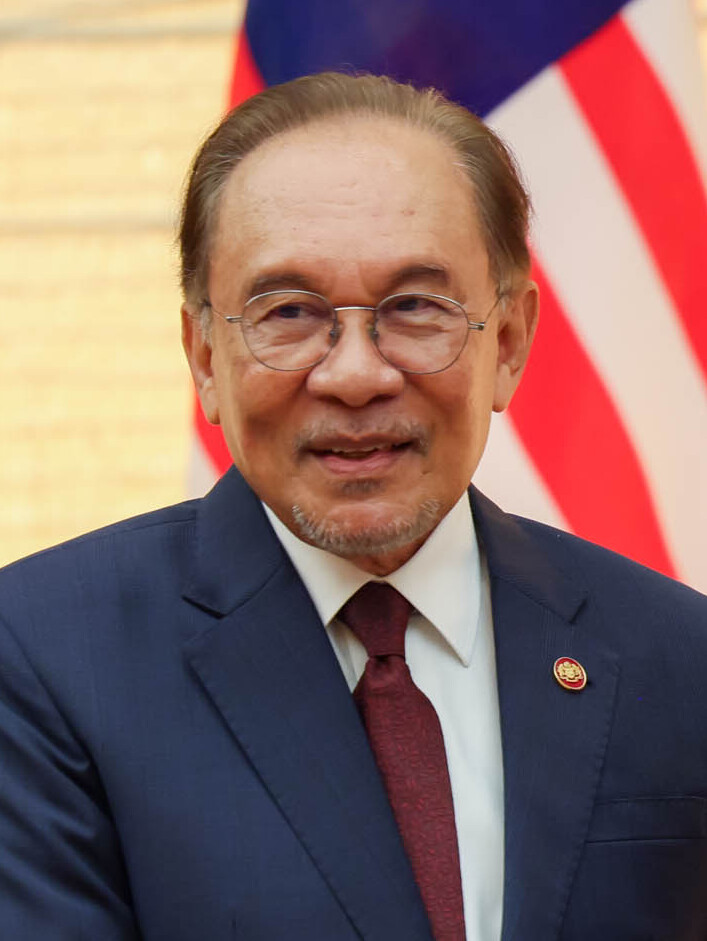
Malaysia
Anwar Ibrahim,
Prime Minister

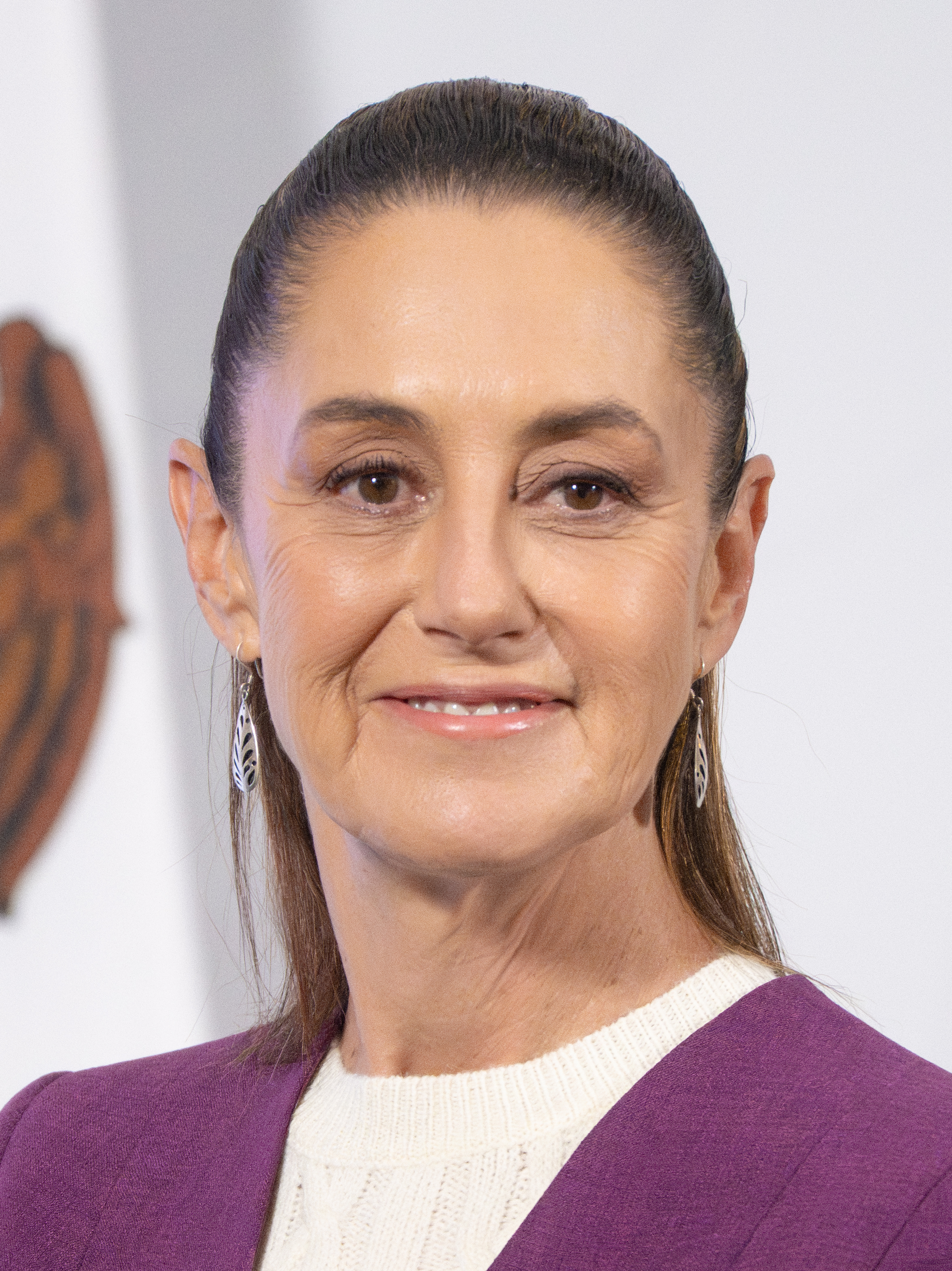
Mexico
Claudia Sheinbaum,
President

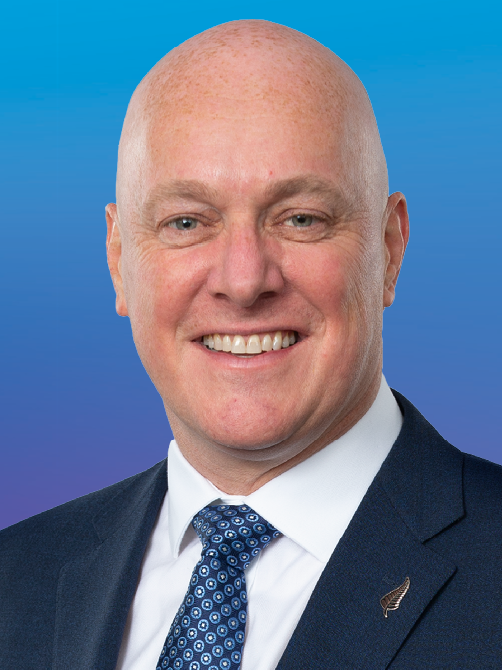
New Zealand
Christopher Luxon,
Prime Minister

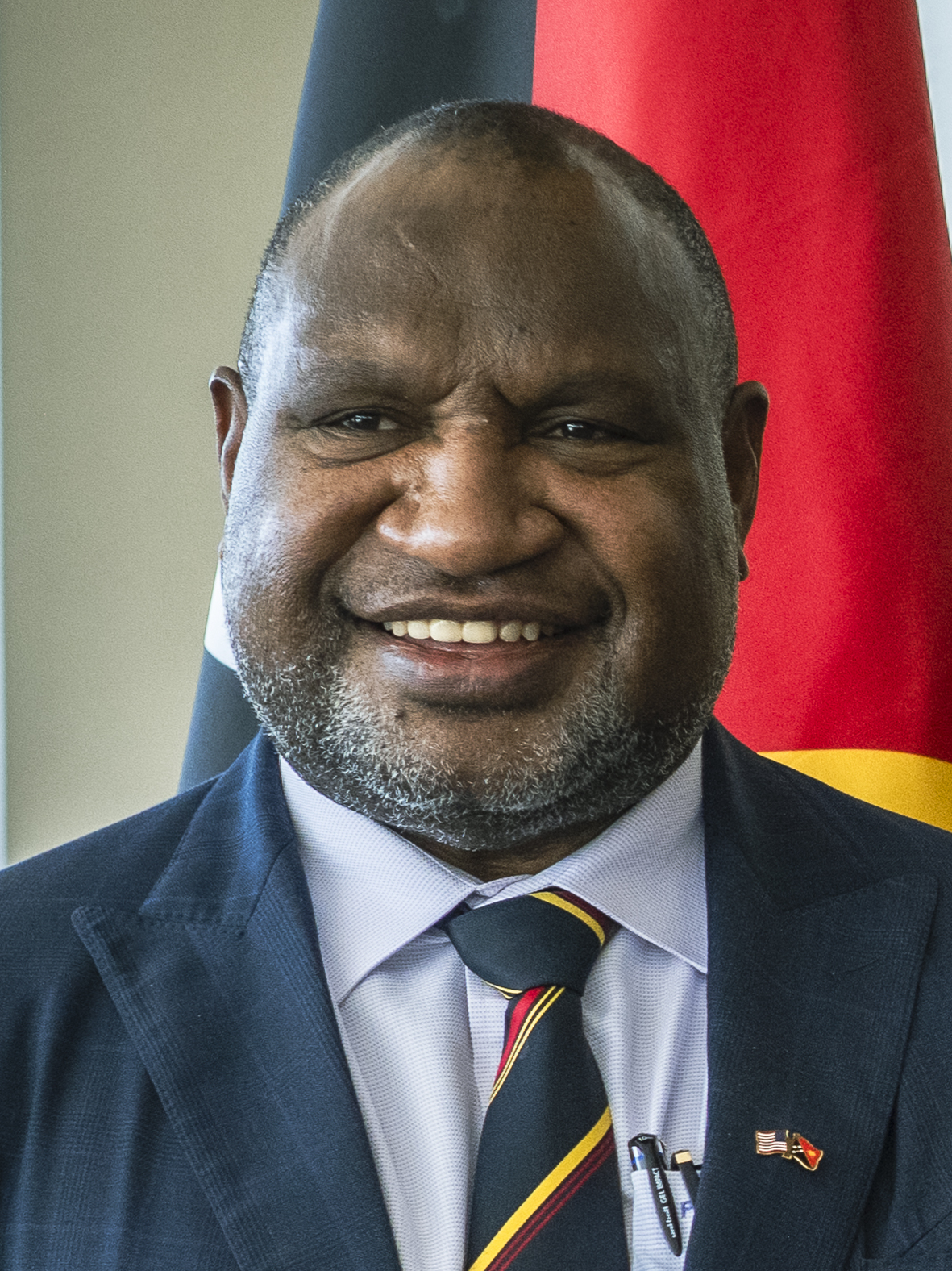
Papua New Guinea
James Marape,
Prime Minister

Peru
Keiko Fujimori,
President

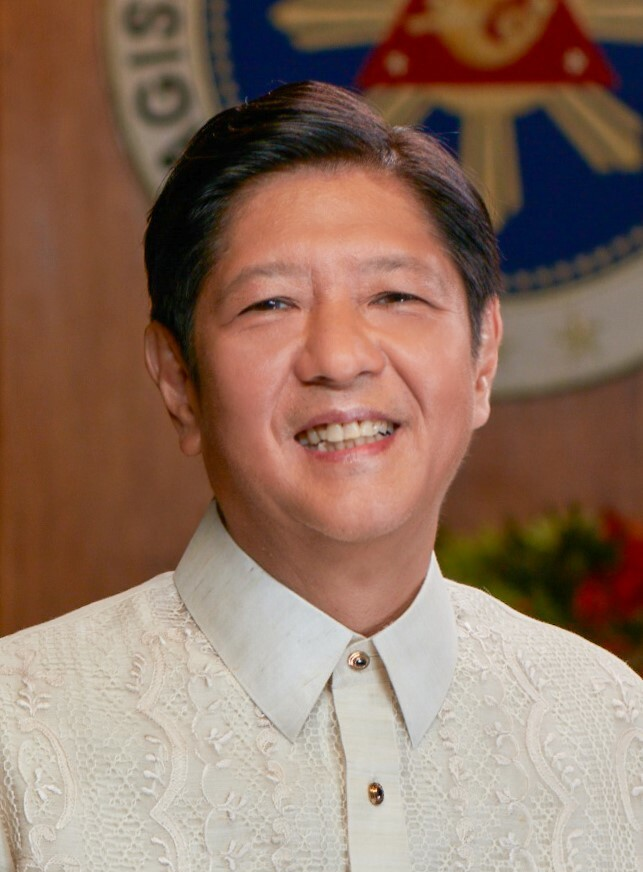
Philippines
Bongbong Marcos,
President

Russia
Vladimir Putin,
President

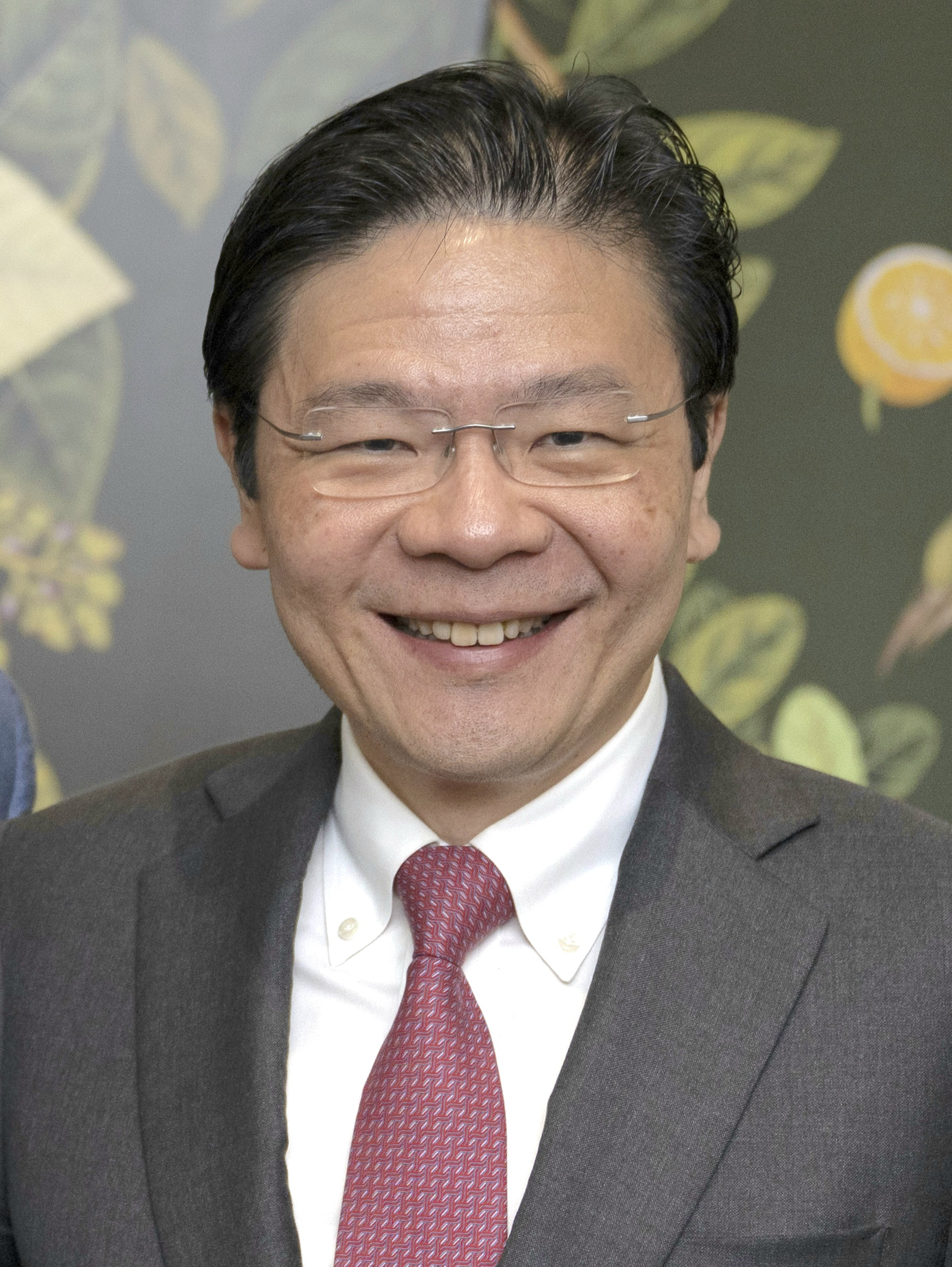
Singapore
Lawrence Wong,
Prime Minister

Chinese Taipei
Stan Shih,
Special Representative of Leader (Note: Due to the complexities of the relations between it and the People's Republic of China, the Republic of China (ROC or "Taiwan") was not represented under its official name "Republic of China" or as "Taiwan". Instead, it participates in APEC under the name "Chinese Taipei". The president of the Republic of China does not attend the annual APEC Economic Leaders' Meeting in person. Instead, it was generally represented by a ministerial-level official responsible for economic affairs or someone designated by the president. See List of Chinese Taipei representatives to APEC.)

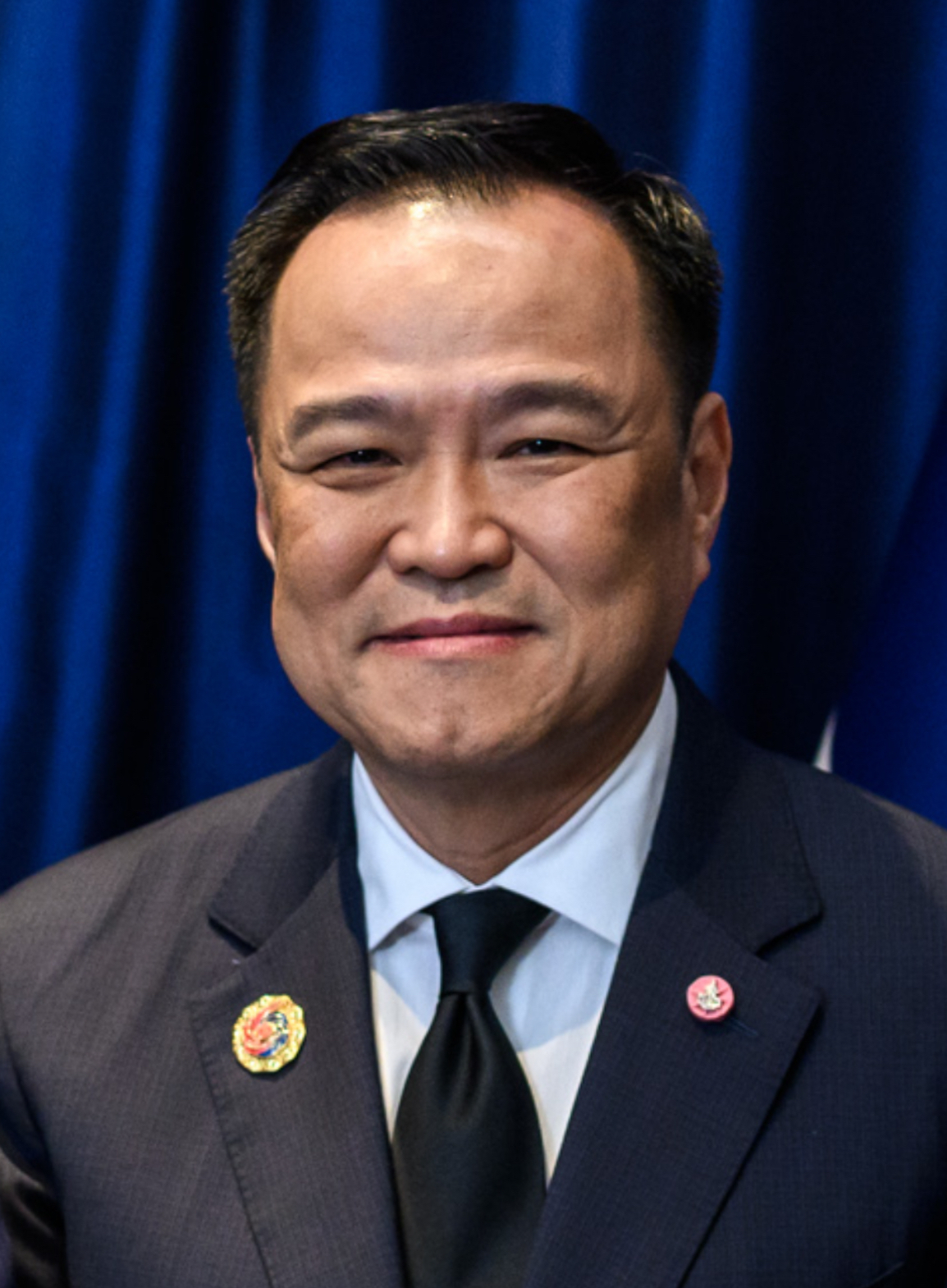
Thailand
Anutin Charnvirakul,
Prime Minister

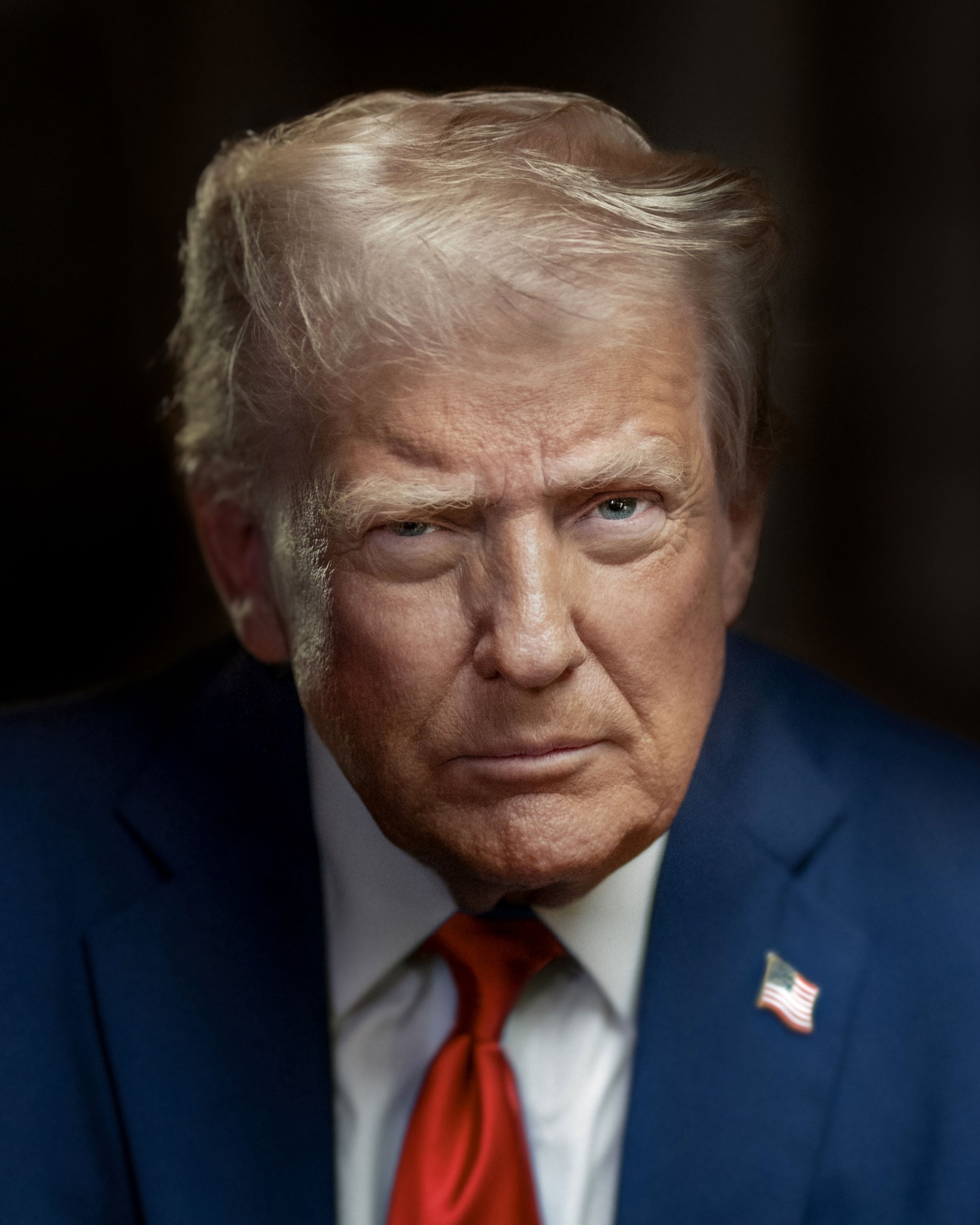
United States
Donald Trump,
President

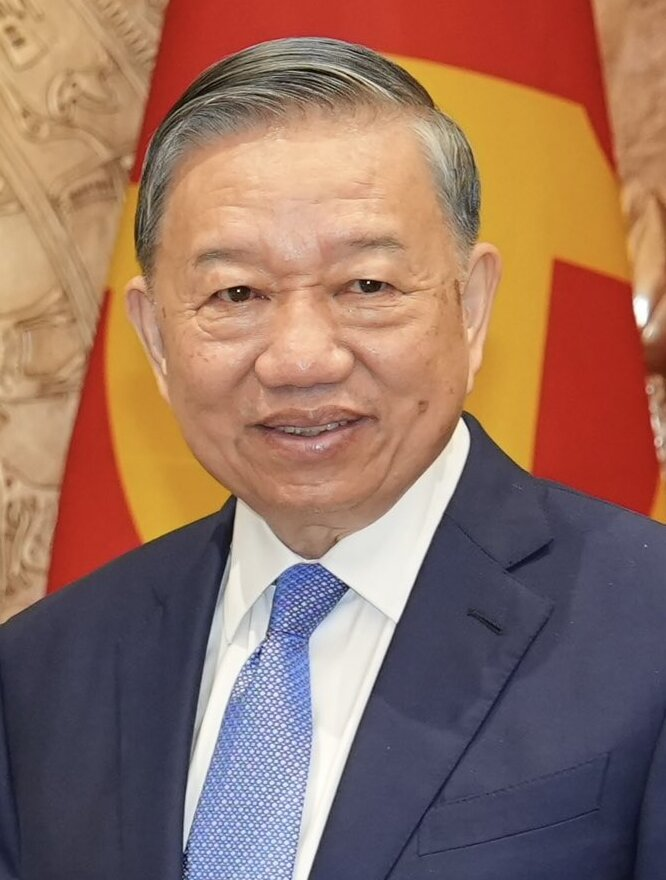
Vietnam
Tô Lâm,
CPV General Secretary and President (Note: The actual head of the executive government of Vietnam is the Prime Minister, whose current holder is Lê Minh Hưng. The President of Vietnam is legally the head of state, but the General Secretary of the Communist Party of Vietnam is the practical highest political leader in a one-party communist state. Both seats are currently held by Tô Lâm, as they are sometimes, but not always, held by the same person in Vietnam.)

=== Invited guests ===
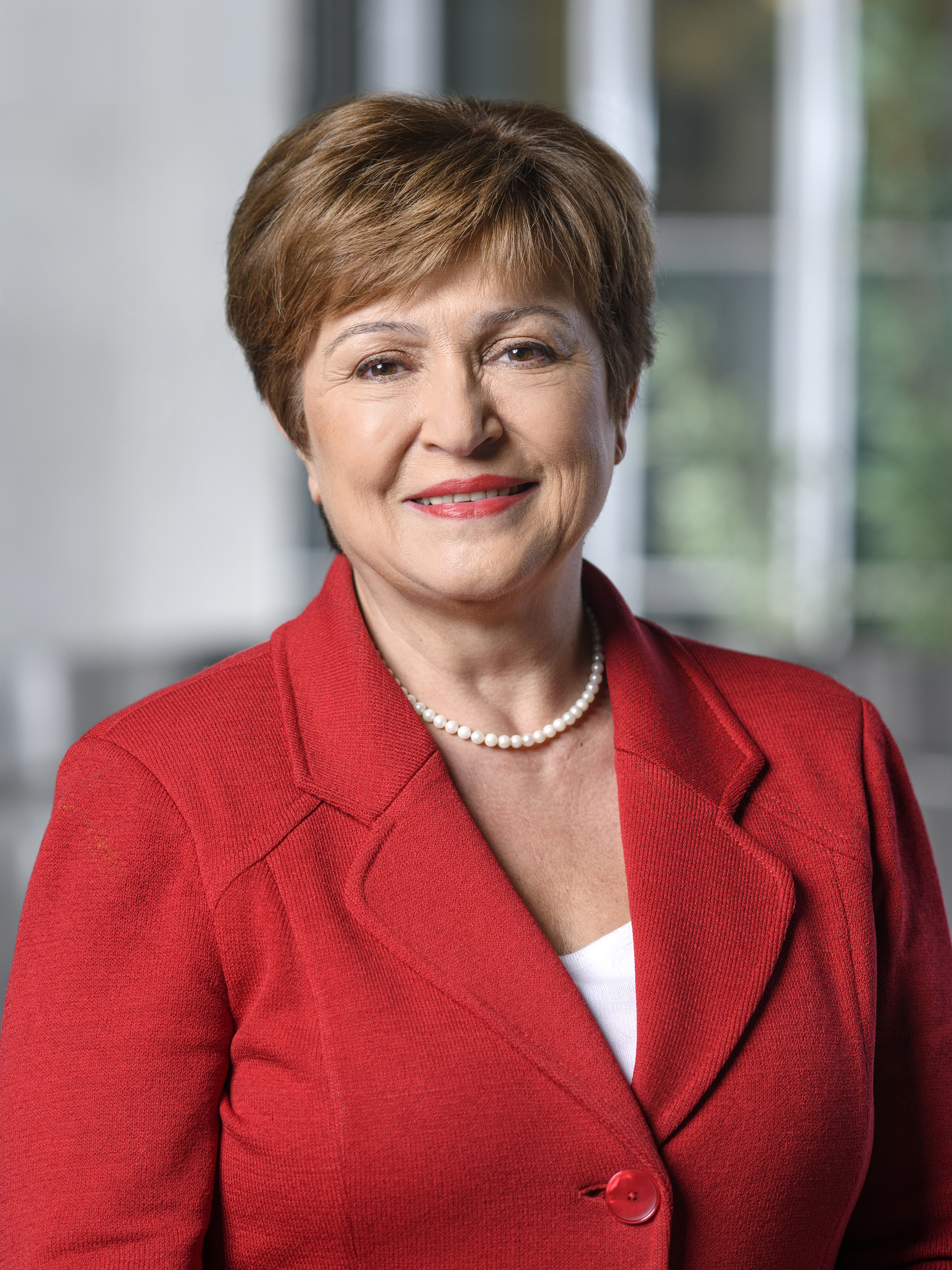
International Monetary Fund
Kristalina Georgieva,
Managing Director

== The summit ==
=== 16–17 November ===
Russian president Vladimir Putin and Chinese leader Xi Jinping holding talks in Shenzhen on the sidelines of the 2026 APEC Summit on 18 November 2026

Delegations of Canada and Mexico arrived in Shenzhen on 16 November, while the delegations of Vietnam, Chile, Papua New Guinea, Peru and Hong Kong arrived on 17 November.

On the same day, Chinese leader Xi first held a meeting with Vietnamese leader Tô Lâm, telling him that China and Vietnam were "comrades and brothers" and "should stand together all the more in turbulent times", while calling for cooperation on maritime issues. Xi then met Canadian prime minister Mark Carney, with the latter saying that Canada and China's relationship now had "greater predictability and stability". Canada also said Carney "has recalibrated our relationship with China -- strategically, pragmatically, and decisively" and said the two countries would boost trade. The meeting was followed by Xi's meeting with Papua New Guinean prime minister James Marape, who assured China that Papua New Guinea had closed Taiwan's representative office in the country, saying that he hopes it "assists you in your efforts for reunification".

In the afternoon, Xi held a meeting with Chilean president José Antonio Kast, who said relations had "remained stable, beyond internal situations that may have affected our country" and praised China for lifting people out of poverty, while adding Chile respects "the political organisations of each nation". Xi then held a meeting with Mexican president Claudia Sheinbaum, who told Xi that Mexico was interested in expanding cooperation with China on technology, agriculture, water resources, health and tourism, while Xi said the two countries should "treat each other with sincerity, deepen political mutual trust". Xi then met with Peruvian president Keiko Fujimori, who asked China for help regarding the 2026–2027 El Niño event and said Peru was "introducing countercyclical measures to prevent the economy from slowing" and "like you, ensure that poverty levels continue to decline"; Xi pledged US$15 million in non-repayable aid plus US$7.5 million in machinery. Carney and Sheinbaum also held a meeting to discuss their trade relationship.

=== 18 November ===
Donald Trump arriving at Shenzhen Bao'an International Airport and being greeted by Xi Jinping on 18 November 2026

I have often said that to see a thousand years of China, one should visit Xi’an; to see five hundred years of China, one should visit Beijing; and to see a hundred years of China, one should visit Shanghai. Today, I would like to say to you all: to see fifty years of China, come to Shenzhen.

Shenzhen is a place with a rich history. In 1978, when I first came to Shenzhen, it was still a small fishing village. More than 40 years have passed in the blink of an eye, and now it is filled with high-rise buildings and bustling traffic. The changes are truly remarkable.

— Xi Jinping at the welcome banquet for the APEC summit, 18 November 2026

The delegations of Malaysia, Russia, South Korea, Brunei, Australia, Indonesia, Thailand, the Philippines and the United States arrived on 18 November.

During the day, Xi held a two-hour meeting with Russian president Vladimir Putin, where he said relations between China and Russia are "unshaken by storms and steady as a mountain". Xi also held a meeting with South Korean president Lee Jae Myung, with both leaders marking the 35th anniversary of diplomatic ties. Xi said he was willing to assist in "various efforts aimed at easing tensions on the Korean Peninsula, including a North Korea-U.S. dialogue", while Lee asked China to play "a constructive role" in the Korean Peninsula issues, which he said was a "do or die" matter.

Later, Xi greeted Trump personally when he arrived in Shenzhen through the Shenzhen Bao’an International Airport, the first time in 45 years when a Chinese leader had welcomed a foreign dignitary at the airport. The move reciprocated from Xi's state visit to the U.S. in September 2026, where Trump greeted Xi at the airport, with Xi saying that "China is a nation of etiquette with a tradition of reciprocity". Takaichi and Putin also held a 30-minute meeting, the first meeting between Japanese and Russian leaders since the 2022 Russian invasion of Ukraine.

The leaders later attended the APEC welcome reception, where Xi greeted the leaders; Trump and Putin also shook hands in the presence of Xi. Afterwards, Xi gave a speech. The leaders' of the APEC members also posed for a "family photo". Both Australian prime minister Anthony Albanese and Canadian prime minister Mark Carney previously confirmed they would join the leaders' photo, citing respect for the wishes of the host country China, but said they would make their views clear on the Russo-Ukrainian war. Following the banquet meeting, Trump held a meeting with Carney, followed by a meeting with Sheinbaum.

=== 19 November ===
On 19 November, the leaders of the APEC countries again posed for a "family photo". The leaders then attended the plenary meeting of the APEC summit, where they gave speeches. Xi said "Members of Apec are like passengers riding the same ship. To navigate the waves of the Pacific, we must unite as one and look out for each other." Putin said "I would like to emphasise ‌that constructive partnership with Apec economies is Russia’s strategic course. We are an integral part of the ‌region and make a significant contribution to its economic prosperity". On the sidelines of the summit, Trump and Putin held a bilateral meeting; Trump described Putin as a "friend" and said "We’ve had ‌a great relationship ‌for many years. We know each other for a long ‌time, and I think a lot of wonderful things can come out of this, or at least start. But I think they’ll ‌come out of this".

Afterwards, Trump and Xi held a bilateral meeting; he also described Xi as a "friend" and said the two had a special relationship while saying the Board of Trade established following Trump's May 2026 visit to China had brought balance to the relationship. Xi said "We have established a new definition of a constructive China-US relationship of strategic stability, giving it new substance based on respect, fairness and reciprocity" and that he was looking forward "to working with President Trump to continue steering the course of China-US relations and to ensure that this big ship always sails along the right course". He said China and the U.S. should "extend the list of cooperation and shorten the list of problems" and that "Disagreements that cannot be resolved immediately should be constructively managed to prevent conflicts from escalating". He said the two countries should work together to reduce AI risks and ensure it remains under human control. Regarding Taiwan, Xi said that he hopes the U.S. to "do the right thing to avoid major setbacks".

Afterwards, the trilateral talks began. The same day, the APEC meeting concluded. The APEC leaders issued the joint "Shenzhen Outlook", which called on the countries to "improve the trade and investment environment" and encouraged "voluntary exchange of good practices" to support innovation, and flagged the risks of data breaches and the use of technology for nefarious purposes. It also emphasized the importance of maintaining the flow of energy and "other essential goods".

== China–Russia–United States summit ==
China–Russia–U.S. Shenzhen Summit 中俄美元首深圳会晤 Шэньчжэньская встреча глав государств КНР, РФ и США
- Host country: China
- Date: 19 November 2026
- Cities: Shenzhen, Guangdong, China
- Venues: Kylin Villa
- Participants: (China) Xi Jinping; (Russia) Vladimir Putin; (United States) Donald Trump

=== Preparations ===
On 19 October 2026, The Wall Street Journal reported that during a phone call on 9 October with U.S. President Donald Trump, Russian President Vladimir Putin proposed a trilateral summit with him, Trump and Chinese leader Xi Jinping to discuss Ukraine, with Trump being receptive to the idea. They also discussed the Iran War. The Kremlin proposed to hold the summit on the sidelines of the APEC summit, while Chinese officials signalled to Russia they would not object if Trump is on board. The same day, Trump told reporters he would be open to such an agreement "not so much for Ukraine, because Russia, frankly, has been fine on Ukraine, they haven’t been doing much—and the same thing with China" but that "we would have it to talk about nuclear weapons and denuclearization" and that it would be "a very positive thing for the world".

On 13 November the White House confirmed a trilateral summit would be held, with spokeswoman Olivia Wales saying "The President has made it clear that, among other topics, he will discuss the reduction of nuclear weapons in the world. This proliferation, President Trump believes, is very dangerous". Chinese analysts expressed doubts about the prospects for a trilateral nuclear arms control agreement, citing China's significantly smaller nuclear arsenal compared with those of the United States and Russia. On 16 November, China's Ministry of Foreign Affairs confirmed that Xi would host a China–Russia–U.S. Summit in Shenzhen on 19 November. The same day, foreign ministry spokesperson Mao Ning said the three leaders would "exchange views in depth on safeguarding world peace and promoting strategic stability in major-power relations, which is of groundbreaking significance". Yuri Ushakov, the assistant to the Russian President for Foreign Policy, told Interfax on the same day that "difficult diplomatic work" was underway for a possible joint statement, adding "The agenda and the text of the joint statement are being worked out at this very moment" and said "Will we come to an understanding? I hope so." He added that China and Russia had made suggestions for a joint statement and were waiting for a response from the U.S., adding they had agreed to "taking into account the mutual understandings and alliances of our three countries during the Second World War, and stressing our countries’ co-operation in building the United Nations".

=== The meeting ===
China–Russia–United States trilateral meeting at APEC China 2026

The summit began on 19 November in the Kylin Villa, and lasted one hour and 30 minutes, above the initial planned schedule of one hour. Putin said "our three states have a joint responsibility in maintaining peace and security" and added "we should discuss global and regional ties, as well as energy security", while saying the U.S. "can contribute to strengthening global stability if they cooperate constructively". Trump said the three leaders were "making history", saying "no peace is ever forged by declining opportunities" and added the three nations were "uniquely positioned” to discuss nuclear weapons", He also said the International Criminal Court is "out of control". Putin said the three countries had "many converging interests" including ending the war in Ukraine, and said they "shared responsibility for maintaining international peace and security". Xi said "every effort must be made to prevent nuclear war". Trump said the countries were "uniquely positioned" to discuss reduction of nuclear stockpiles but said "It’s not an easy thing to do – give them up". Xi said that major powers must have "positive interaction" and said the three countries can set an example by "cooperating to address global challenges, jointly safeguarding world peace and stability".

After the conclusion of the summit, the three leaders issued the "China-Russia-U.S. Heads of State Declaration toward Peace". In the declaration, the three leaders agreed to promote reform of the United Nations. They also agreed to increase supplies of refined petroleum products. They agreed that "the principle of state consent and respect for immunities of State officials are of paramount importance" and stated the International Criminal Court and similar bodies "must not abuse their jurisdiction". Regarding nuclear weapons, the three leaders agreed that "a nuclear war cannot be won and must never be fought" and said they would conduct negotiations on reducing nuclear risks and stop proliferation of nuclear weapons.

After the meeting, Trump spoke with Japanese Prime Minister Sanae Takaichi that evening, telling her the content of the meeting. The two leaders exchanged views on the situation in the Indo-Pacific region and the Russia-Ukraine war. After returning to the U.S., Trump hosted a White House press conference regarding the summit.

== See also ==
- 2026 ASEAN Summits
- 2026 G20 Miami summit

== Notes ==
Preceded by APEC South Korea 2025	APEC meetings 2026	Succeeded by (APEC Vietnam 2027)
