= Changsha International Conference Center =

- 长沙国际会议中心
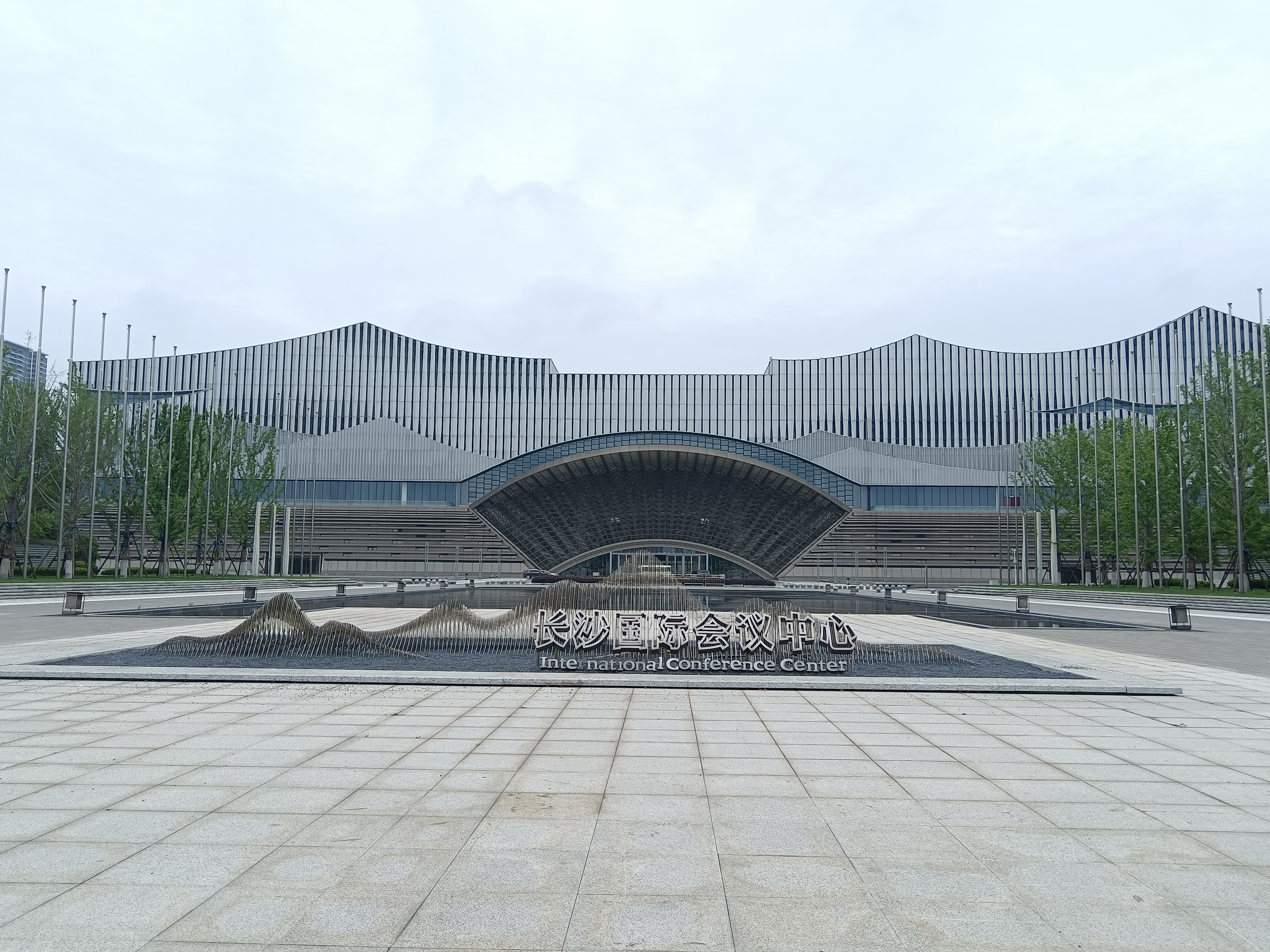
- Changsha International Conference Center in 2025

- Location within Hunan

General information
- Type: Modern architecture
- Location: Changsha County, Hunan, China
- Coordinates: 28°09′14.62″N 113°04′23.92″E
- Groundbreaking: 2019
- Completed: October 30, 2020
- Cost: 3 billion yuan

Height
- Architectural: Chinese architecture

Technical details
- Material: Glass, steel, concrete
- Floor area: 170,000 m^{2} (1,800,000 sq ft)

Design and construction
- Architect: He Jingtang
- Architecture firm: South China University of Technology Architectural Design and Research Institute Co., Ltd.

Chinese name
- Simplified Chinese: 长沙国际会议中心
- Traditional Chinese: 長沙國際會議中心
Transcriptions
Standard Mandarin
- Hanyu Pinyin: Chángshā Guójì Huìyì Zhōngxīn

Changsha International Conference Center (Chinese: 长沙国际会展中心) is a large-scale conference facility located in the town of Huangxing, Changsha County, Hunan, China. It is recognized as the largest and highest-specification international conference center in central China.

== History ==
Changsha International Conference Center was officially delivered and began operations on 30 October 2020. The total investment in the project was nearly 3 billion yuan. It was designed by He Jingtang, an academician of the Chinese Academy of Engineering.

== Facilities ==
With a total construction area of approximately 170,000 m^{2} (1,800,000 sq ft), Changsha International Conference Center houses over 60 meeting rooms and halls.

Key venues include:

- Furong Hall (芙蓉厅; 芙蓉廳; Fúróng Tīng): the main hall, covering 7,800 m^{2} (84,000 sq ft), is a column-free space that can accommodate up to 7,000 people and can be divided into three separate sections.
- A 1,800 m^{2} (19,000 sq ft) round-table conference hall.
- A 3,400 m^{2} (37,000 sq ft) banquet hall.
- A 7,000 m^{2} (75,000 sq ft) outdoor Chinese-style rooftop garden, often referred to as the "Cloud Garden" or "Cloud Academy".

== Surrounding buildings ==
Several hotels are located near Changsha International Conference Center, providing accommodation for guests:

- Novotel Changsha International Exhibition Center
- Ibis Styles Changsha International Exhibition Center
- Steigenberger Icons Hotel Changsha

== Transportation ==
The nearest metro station is Guangda station, served by Line 2 or Line 4. It is approximately a 400 m (1,300 ft) walk from the station to Changsha International Conference Center.
