= Shenzhen International Exchange Center =

Conference center in Shenzhen, China

- 深圳国际交流中心
- Interactive map of Shenzhen International Exchange Center
- Location: Xiangmihu, Futian District, Shenzhen, Guangdong, China

Convention use
- Total space: 470,000 m^{2} (5,100,000 sq ft) (entire complex, including hotel)

Construction
- Built: 2021–2026
- Opened: 2026
- Architects: He Jingtang and his team

The Shenzhen International Exchange Center (Chinese: 深圳国际交流中心) is a convention center complex in the Xiangmihu area of Futian District, Shenzhen, Guangdong, China. It consists of conference facilities and an adjoining hotel. The complex is the main venue for the 2026 APEC Economic Leaders' Meeting, scheduled for 18–19 November 2026.

== History ==
The center was developed on the former site of the Xiangmihu Resort as part of the redevelopment of the northern Xiangmihu area. Construction began on 30 June 2021.

The complex began hosting international meetings in July 2026, when it served as the venue for the Asia-Pacific Economic Cooperation (APEC) Forestry Ministers' Meeting. Preparations for the APEC Economic Leaders' Meeting were completed by 16 November 2026.

== Architecture and facilities ==
The complex was designed by a team led by Chinese architect He Jingtang. Its design incorporates elements of traditional Lingnan architecture, including window lattice patterns and broad projecting roof eaves.

The development has a total floor area of approximately 470,000 square metres, including the conference center and hotel facilities. The main conference hall occupies approximately 5,000 square metres. The complex also contains meeting rooms, exhibition facilities and spaces for accommodation and dining.
