= Shenzhen Library =

Municipal public library in Shenzhen, Guangdong, China

- 深圳图书馆
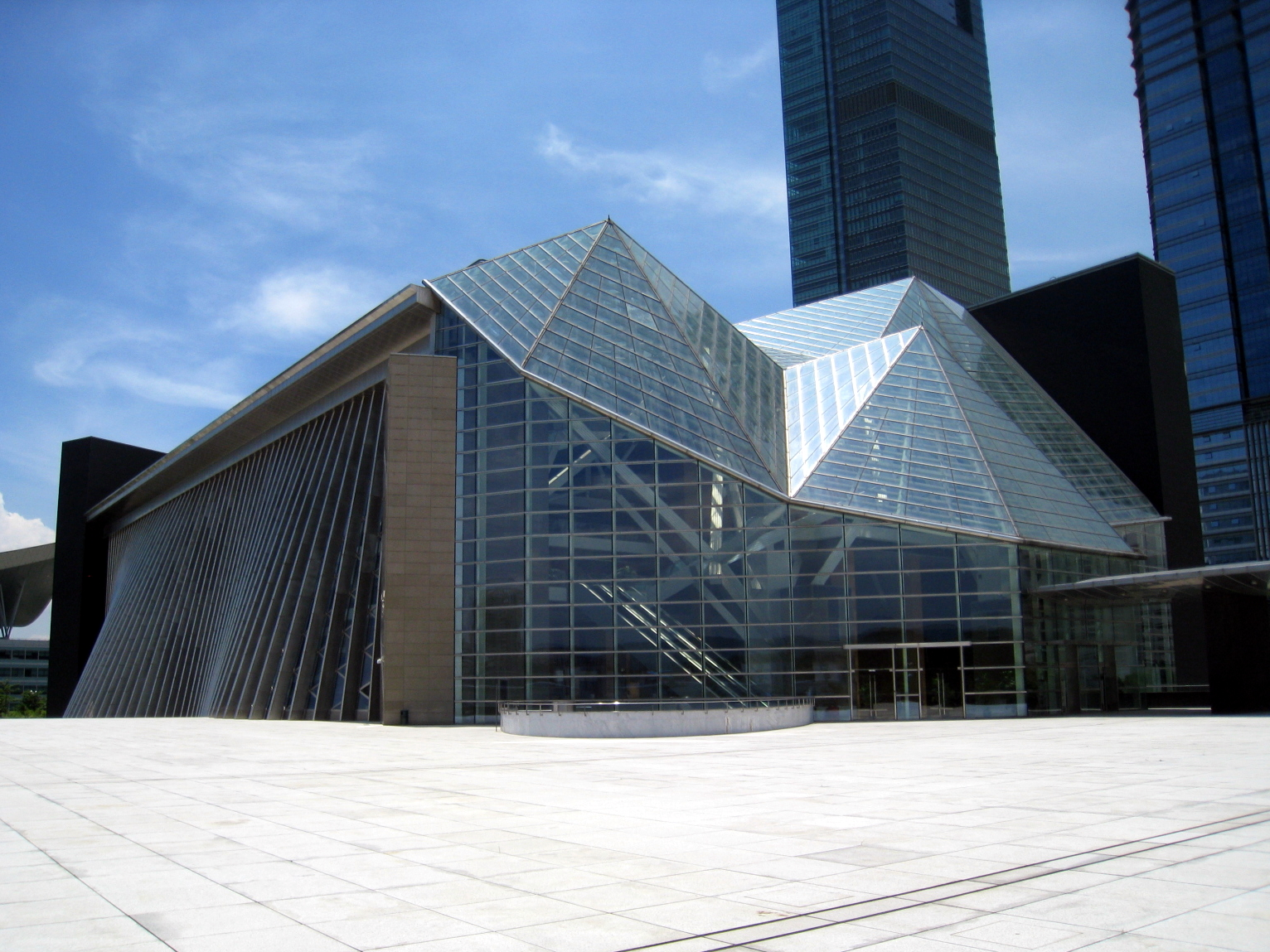
- Shenzhen Library main library
- 22°32′55″N 114°03′07″E
- Location: Shenzhen, Guangdong, China
- Type: Public library

Other information
- Website: szlib.org.cn

Shenzhen Library
- Simplified Chinese: 深圳图书馆
- Traditional Chinese: 深圳圖書館
Transcriptions
Standard Mandarin
- Hanyu Pinyin: Shēnzhèn Túshūguǎn
Yue: Cantonese
- Jyutping: sam1 zan3 tou4 syu1 gun2

Shenzhen Library is the municipal public library of Shenzhen, Guangdong, China. The main library is a part of the Shenzhen Cultural Center in Futian.

The main library occupies a 49,589-square-metre (533,770 sq ft) building on a 29,612-square-metre (318,740 sq ft) plot .

== History ==
It was previously the Bao'an County Library. As of 2016, Shenzhen had 627 public library facilities. The previous facility opened in 1986 in Lychee Park's northwest area after construction began in 1983.

In 2009, the city government began a library platform program called "City of Libraries" ("City of Library" [sic]).

== See also ==
- Shenzhen Library North Hall
- National first-class library
- List of libraries in China
