= Shenzhen Art Museum =

Art museum in Shenzhen, China

- 深圳美术馆
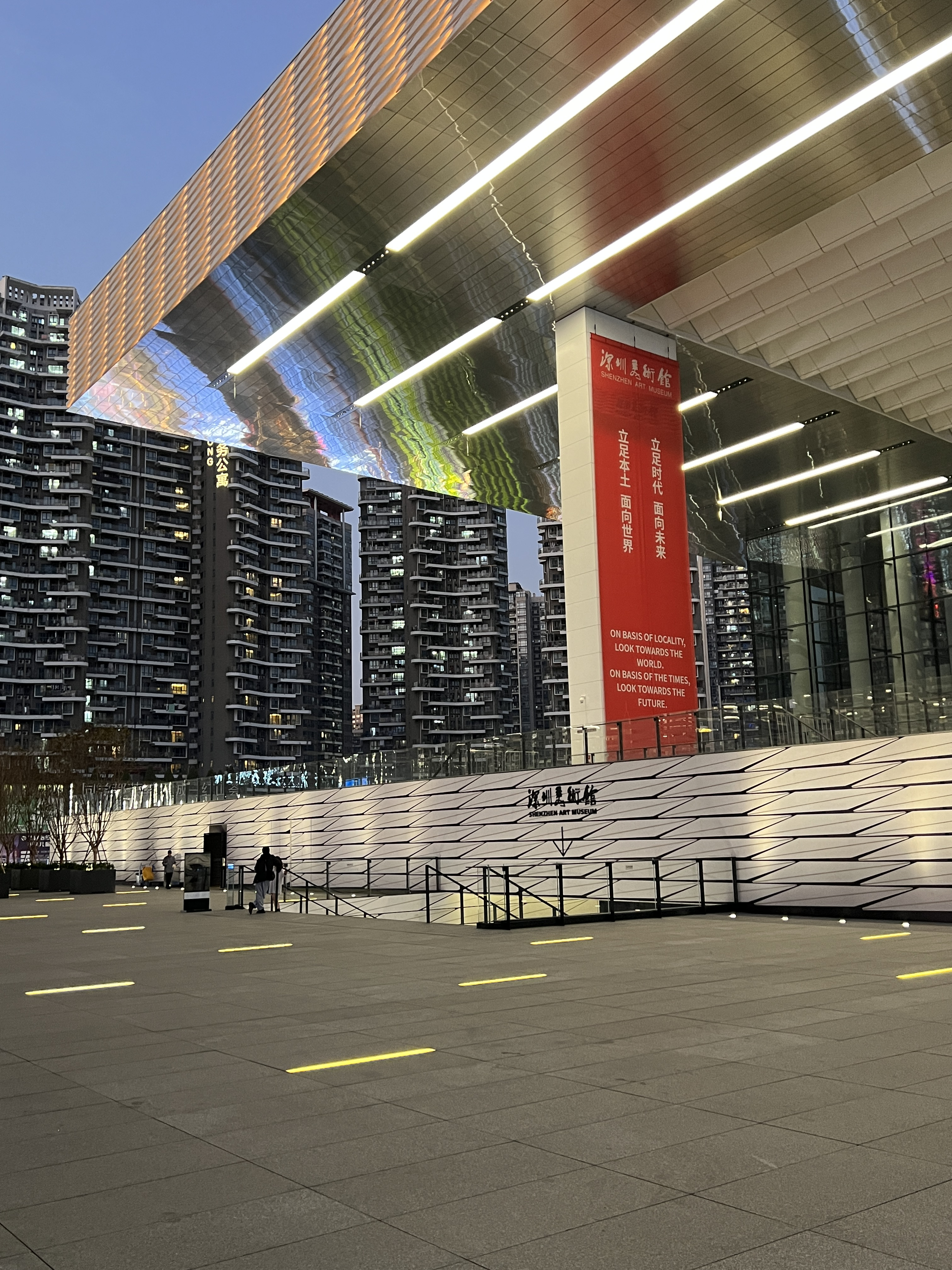
- View of the museum
- Established: 1976 (new venue: 2023)
- Location: 30 Tenglong Road, Longhua District, Shenzhen, Guangdong, China
- Coordinates: 22.5739°N 114.1423°E
- Type: Art museum
- Architects: KSP Jürgen Engel Architekten; Zhubo Design
- Website: www.szartm.com

Shenzhen Art Museum (simplified Chinese: 深圳美术馆; traditional Chinese: 深圳美術館; pinyin: Shēnzhèn Měishùguǎn) is a public art museum in Shenzhen, Guangdong, China.

The museum was founded in 1976 as the Shenzhen Exhibition Hall and was renamed Shenzhen Art Museum in 1987. The museum's main new venue is located in Longhua District, while its earlier Donghu venue is listed by the Shenzhen municipal culture authority in Luohu District.

== History ==
The institution began as the Shenzhen Exhibition Hall in Donghu Park in Luohu District in 1976. It was the earliest art exhibition institution in the city. The original venue covered about 5,500 square metres of land, with a floor area of about 2,800 square metres and an exhibition area of about 1,200 square metres. In 1987, the Shenzhen Exhibition Hall was renamed Shenzhen Art Museum.

As Shenzhen expanded, the museum's earlier facilities were considered insufficient for the city's exhibition needs. In 2018, the new venue project was included in Shenzhen's plan for major cultural and sports facilities. The new venue began trial operation on 28 September 2023 and officially opened on 6 November 2023; its opening exhibitions opened to the public on 7 November 2023.

== New venue ==
The new venue is situated at 30 Tenglong Road in Longhua District, near Hongshan Station on the Shenzhen Metro. It is located near the Shenzhen North Railway Station and forms part of a cultural complex with Shenzhen Library North.

The new venue was jointly designed by KSP Jürgen Engel Architekten and Zhubo Design. It has a gross floor area of 137,610 square metres and being completed in 2023.

The new museum building has a construction area of about 66,000 square metres, including about 20,000 square metres of exhibition space. It contains 18 exhibition halls, a 3,900-square-metre semi-outdoor sculpture exhibition area, an artwork storage area of about 6,200 square metres, lecture spaces, an art book reading room, public education areas, an art-themed restaurant and related visitor facilities.

== Exhibitions and programmes ==
The museum presents exhibitions of Chinese and international art, including collection displays, thematic exhibitions, invited-artist exhibitions and public education activities. The opening programme of the new venue included eight exhibitions and one international forum. China News Service reported that the opening exhibitions presented nearly 1,000 works from different periods and regions. Reported opening exhibitions included collection and document displays from Shenzhen Art Museum, a survey of 45 years of Shenzhen art, an exhibition of works by Qi Baishi from the Beijing Fine Art Academy, a Normandy painting and image exhibition, an art-and-technology exhibition connected with the Prix Ars Electronica, and Shiota Chiharu: The Soul Trembles.

== Transport ==
- Hongshan station, Shenzhen Metro

== See also ==
- Shenzhen Library North Hall
- Shenzhen Museum
- MOCAUP
- He Xiangning Art Museum
