= Shenzhen Library North Hall =

- 深圳图书馆北馆
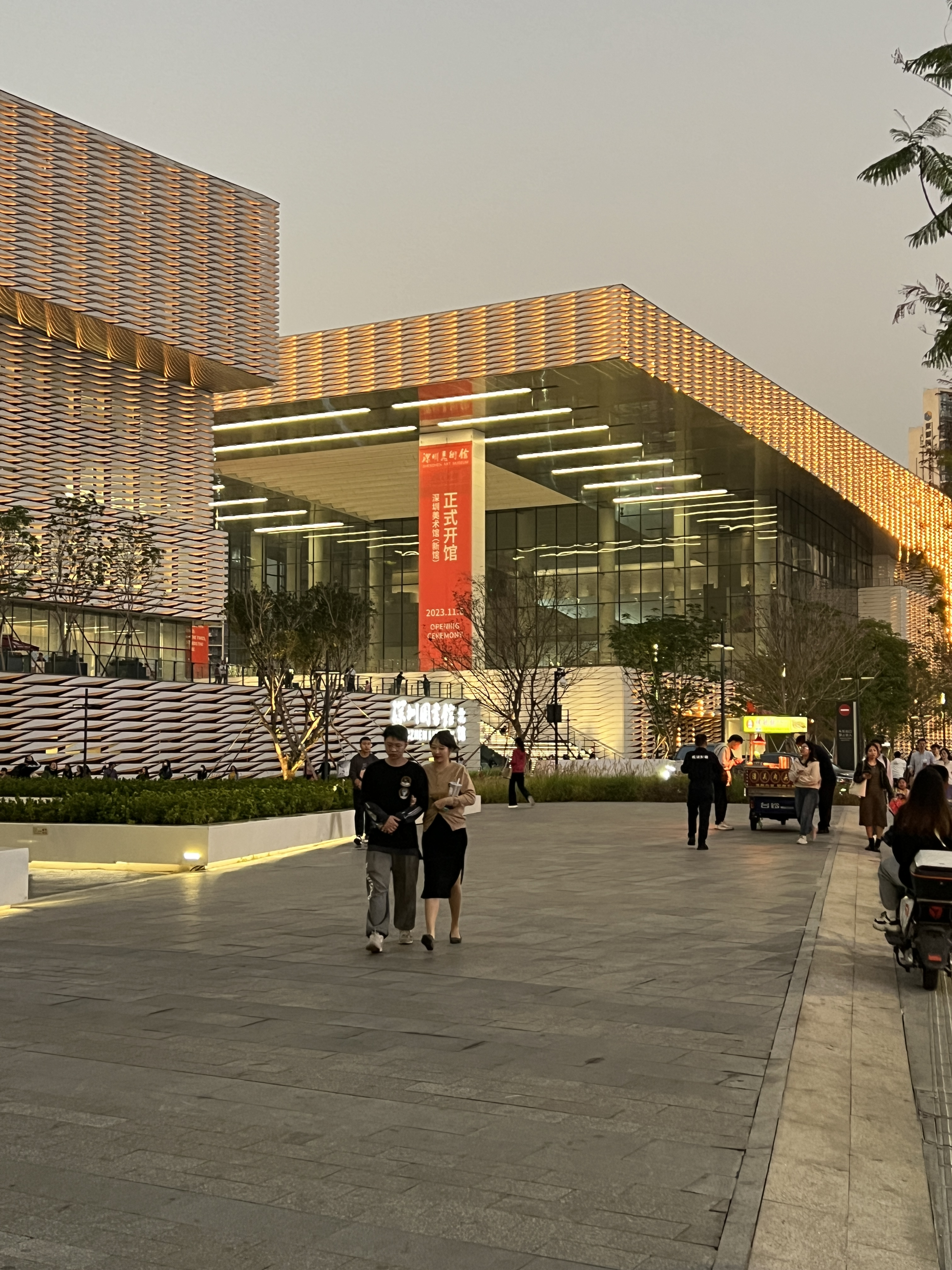
- Interactive map of the Shenzhen Library North Hall area

General information
- Type: Library
- Location: Longhua District, Shenzhen, China
- Opened: 28 December 2023

Technical details
- Floor count: 6
- Floor area: 72,000 m²

Other information
- Seating capacity: 2,500

The Shenzhen Library North Hall (Chinese: 深圳图书馆北馆) is located in Longhua District, Shenzhen, Guangdong Province, People's Republic of China. The North Hall and the main hall are located in different districts. The former is in Longhua District, while the latter is in Futian District, approximately 10 kilometers apart.

The building has an area of approximately 72,000 square meters, with 6 floors above ground and 3 floors underground. It is designed to hold 8 million books and provides 2,500 seats. The building is white, echoing the new building of the Shenzhen Art Museum. It can be reached by taking the Shenzhen Metro Line 4 or Line 6 to Hongshan Station.

== Underground Book Storage ==
The library has an intelligent three-dimensional book storage system located on the third underground floor of the library, reaching a depth of 18 meters. The total area is about 3,000 square meters, close to the size of 7 standard basketball courts, and can accommodate more than 4 million physical books. Whenever a reader places a borrowing order, the robotic arms start shuttling up and down the steel shelves to retrieve the books.

== See also ==
- Shenzhen Library
- Shenzhen Art Museum
