= Shenzhen Concert Hall =

Concert hall in Shenzhen, China

- Simplified Chinese: 深圳音乐厅
- Traditional Chinese: 深圳音樂廳
Transcriptions
Standard Mandarin
- Hanyu Pinyin: Shēnzhèn Yīnyuètīng
Yue: Cantonese
- Jyutping: sam1 zan3 jam1 ngok6 teng1

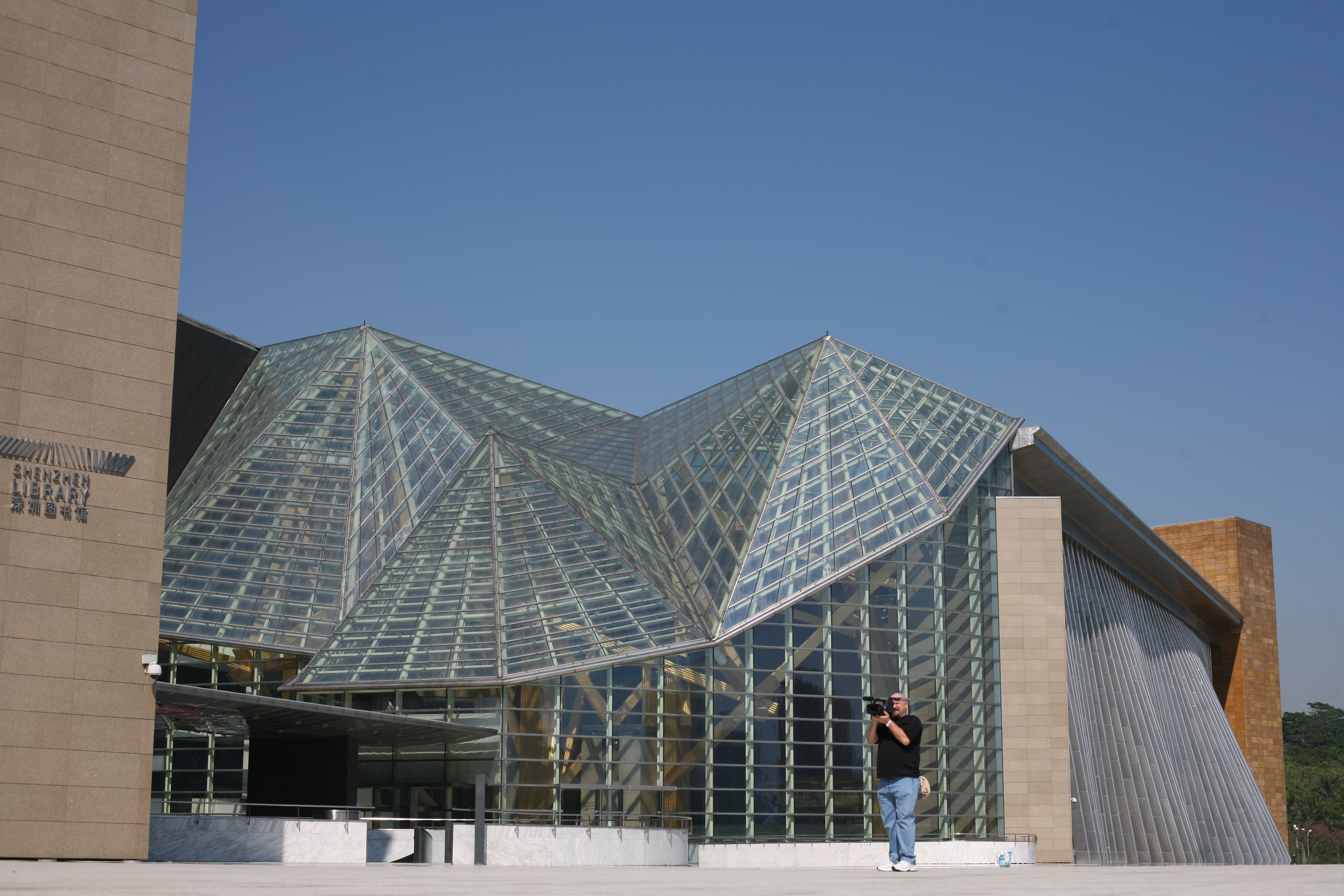
Shenzhen Concert Hall in Shenzhen

The Shenzhen Concert Hall is a concert hall in Futian District, Shenzhen, Guangdong, China.

== History and background ==
The construction of the concert hall was undertaken by Arata Isozaki and Associated in 2008, and funded by the Shenzhen city government. In 2017, about 160,000 people attended concerts there.
