= Shenzhen Museum =

Museum in Shenzhen, Guangdong, China

Coordinates: 22.5465°N 114.0568°E

- 深圳博物馆
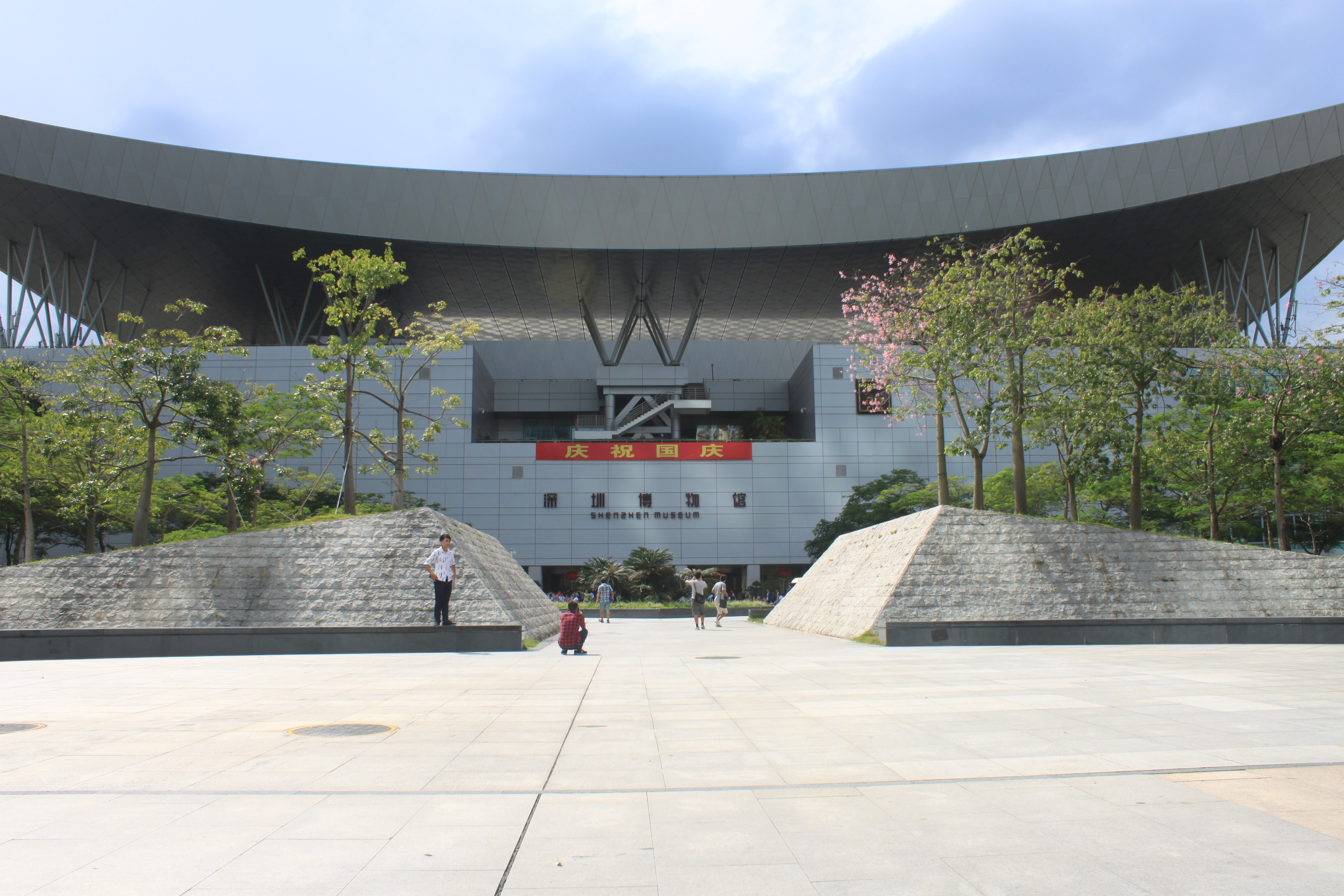
- The Shenzhen Museum of History and Folk Culture, one of the four branches of the Shenzhen Museum
- Location: District A, Citizen Center, Fuzhong Road, Futian District, Shenzhen, Guangdong, China
- Owner: Shenzhen Municipal People's Government
- Website: www.shenzhenmuseum.com

Shenzhen Museum
- Simplified Chinese: 深圳博物馆
- Traditional Chinese: 深圳博物館
Transcriptions
Standard Mandarin
- Hanyu Pinyin: Shēnzhèn Bówùguǎn
Yue: Cantonese
- Jyutping: sam1 zan3 bok3 mat6 gun2

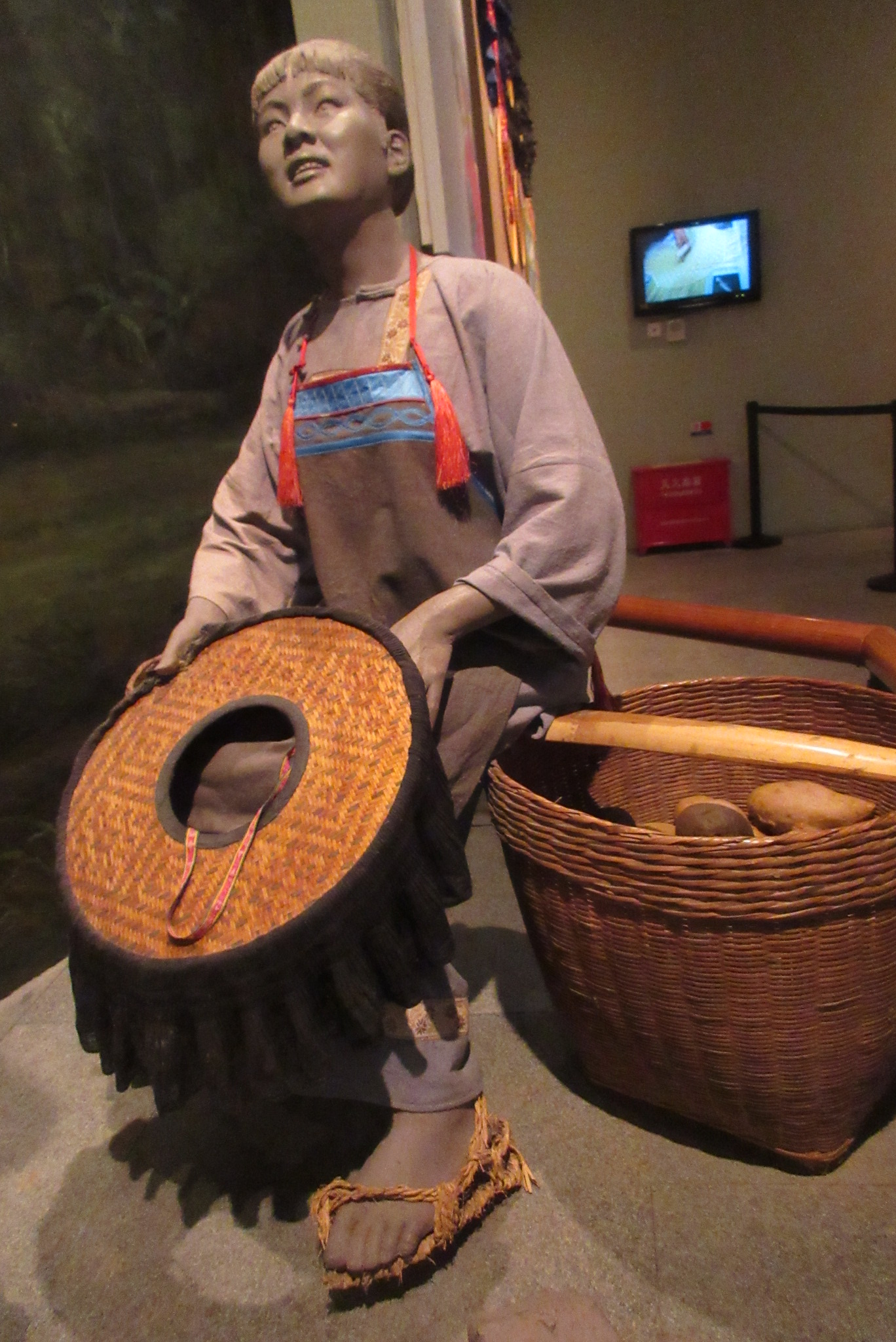
Folk Culture Exhibition Hall

Shenzhen Museum (Chinese: 深圳博物馆) is a public municipal museum in Shenzhen, Guangdong, China. It is funded by the Shenzhen Municipal People's Government.

The museum has a total area of 37,000 square meters, and a building area of 18,000 square meters. The original museum, now the Shenzhen Museum of Ancient Art, was established in 1981, but was not formally opened until 1988. It holds more than 20,000 historical and cultural relics, of which the majority originate within the city.

The Shenzhen Museum comprises four sites: the Shenzhen Museum of Ancient Art (古代艺术馆) on Tongxin Road, the Shenzhen Museum of History and Folk Culture (历史民俗馆) in Civic Center (also called the Jintian Road branch), the Shenzhen Reform and Opening-up Exhibition Hall (深圳改革开放展览馆) within the Shenzhen Museum of Contemporary Art and Urban Planning, and the Dongjiang River Guerrilla Command Headquarters Memorial Museum (东江游击队指挥部旧址纪念馆) in Luohu District.

The Shenzhen Reform and Opening-up Exhibition Hall includes an exhibit on the reform and opening up that began in the 1980s. Among the items on display in the exhibit are several from Deng Xiaoping's 1992 southern tour, including the Flying Sparrow spade he used to plant a tree in Shenzhen, the office goods and furniture from Deng Xiaoping's hotel room, and the white Toyota van in which he toured the city.
