= Civic Center (Shenzhen) =

Government building in Shenzhen, Guangdong, China

Coordinates: 22.54613°N 114.05449°E

- Chinese: 市民中心
Transcriptions
Standard Mandarin
- Hanyu Pinyin: Shìmín Zhōngxīn
Yue: Cantonese
- Jyutping: si^{5}man^{4} zung^{1}sam^{1}

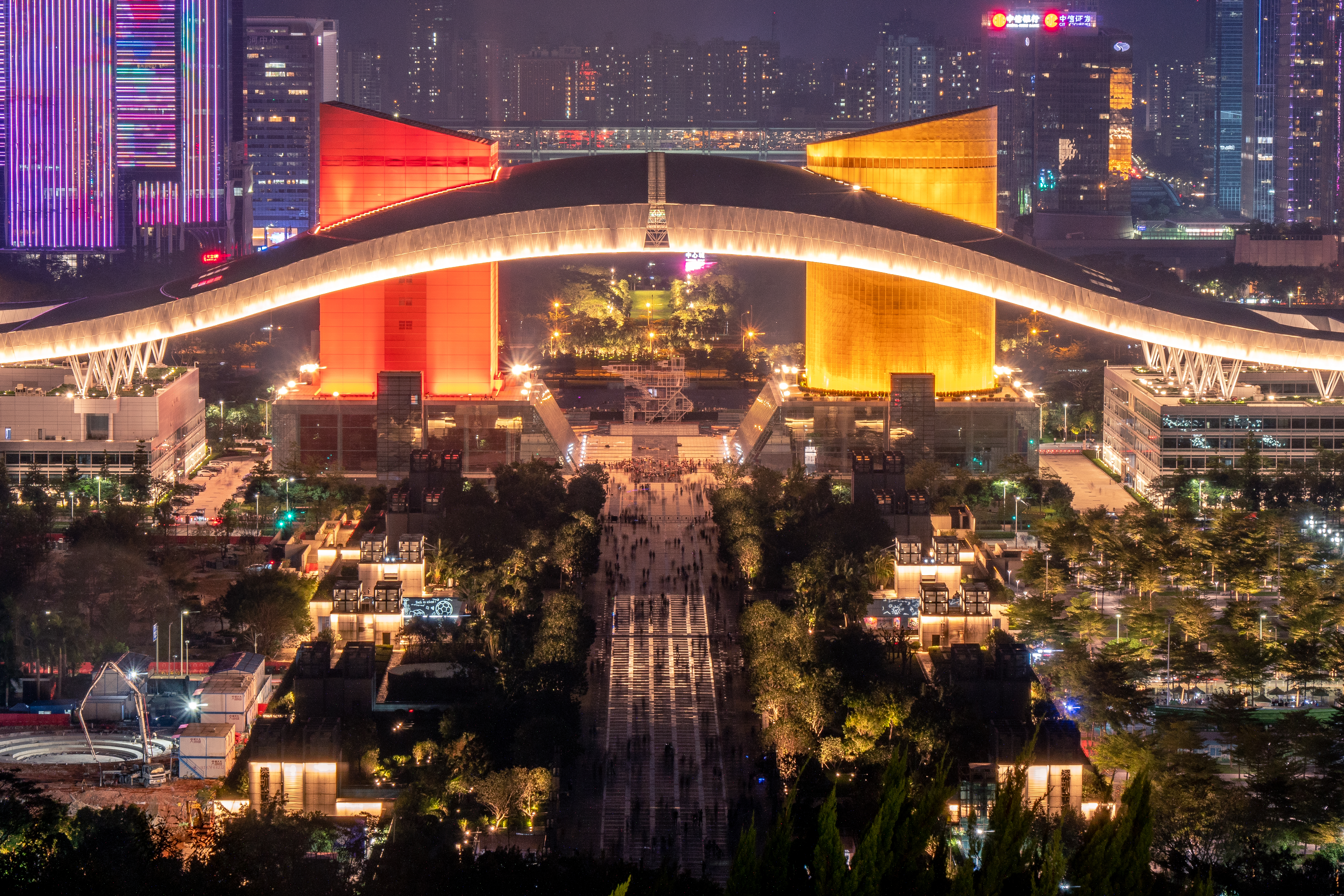
Civic Center

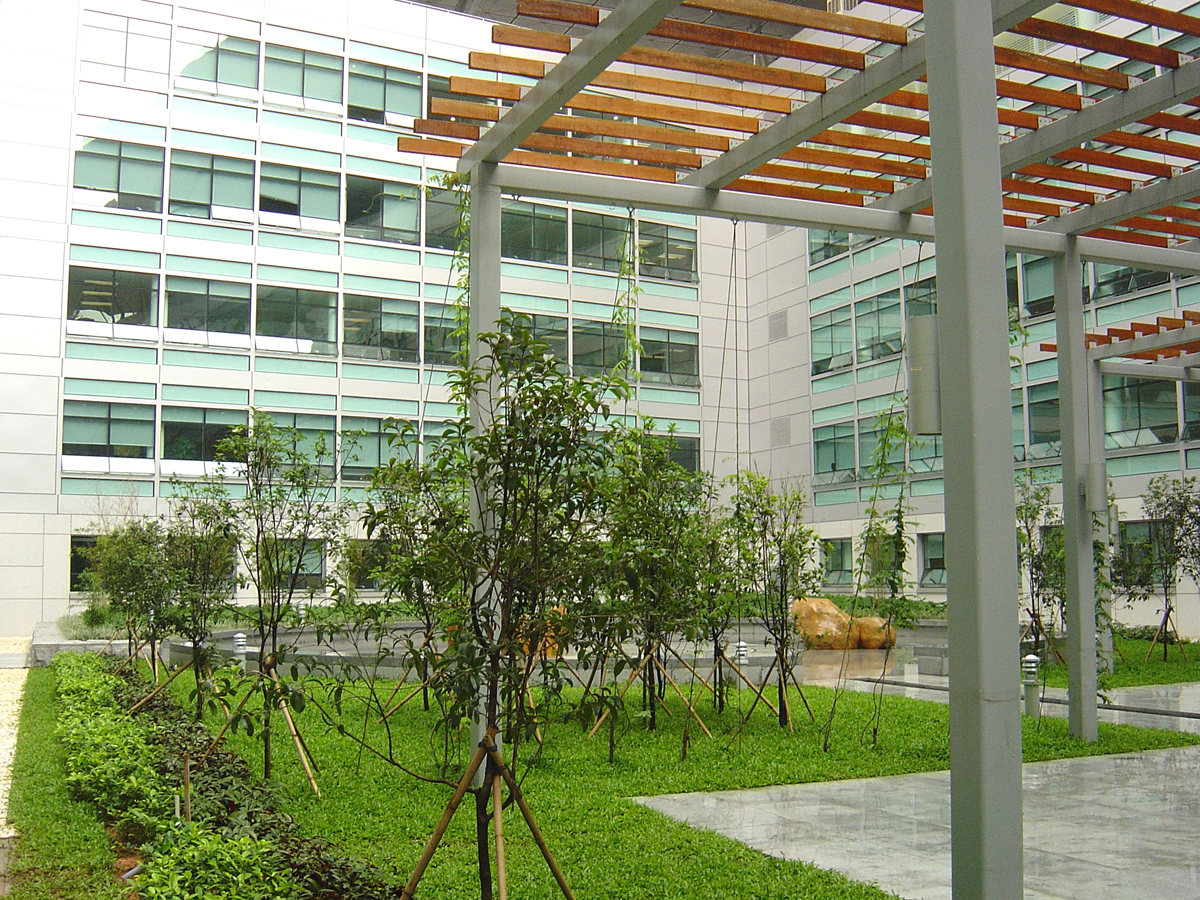
Interior gardens of Shenzhen Civic Center

Architect John MY Lee of Lee/Timchula Architecture, winners of the multi-national competition to design the civic center and urban planning of the Shenzhen Central District

Civic Center or Citizens' Center (Chinese: 市民中心) is a government building in Shenzhen, China. It is located within the Futian Central Business District and was constructed at a cost of CNY 2.172 billion. The civic building was the centerpiece plan for the Shenzhen Futian Central District Master Plan and is "attentive to traditional asian themes and traditions". The overall city plan is based on a central axis, which stretched 2km from Lianhua Mountain in the north, through the Civic Center, and to the Exhibition Center in the south. The land area of the master plan is roughly 100 city blocks and the projected total floor space of the plan is "5 times the size of the original World Trade Center Towers".

== Development ==
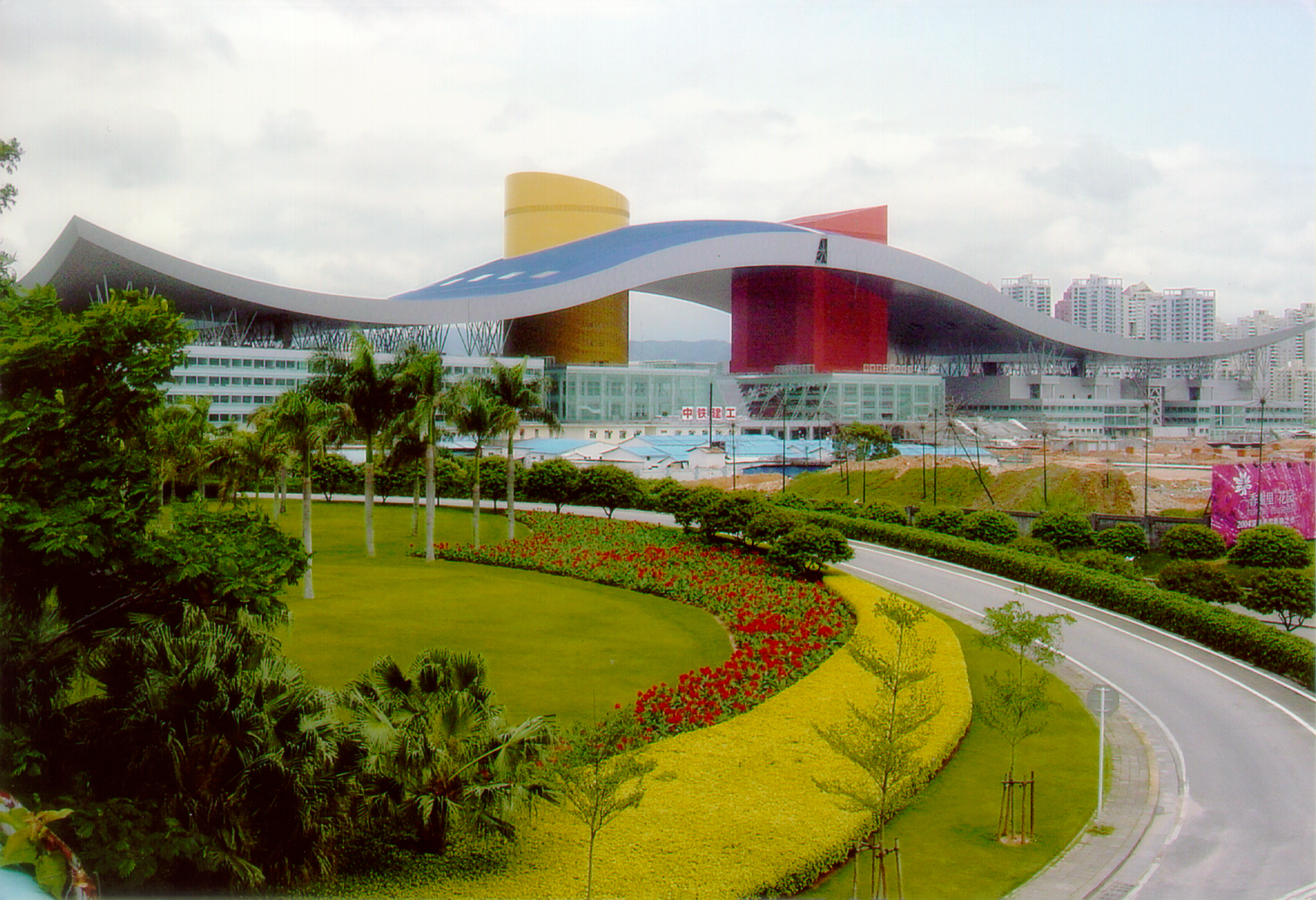
Civic Center under construction

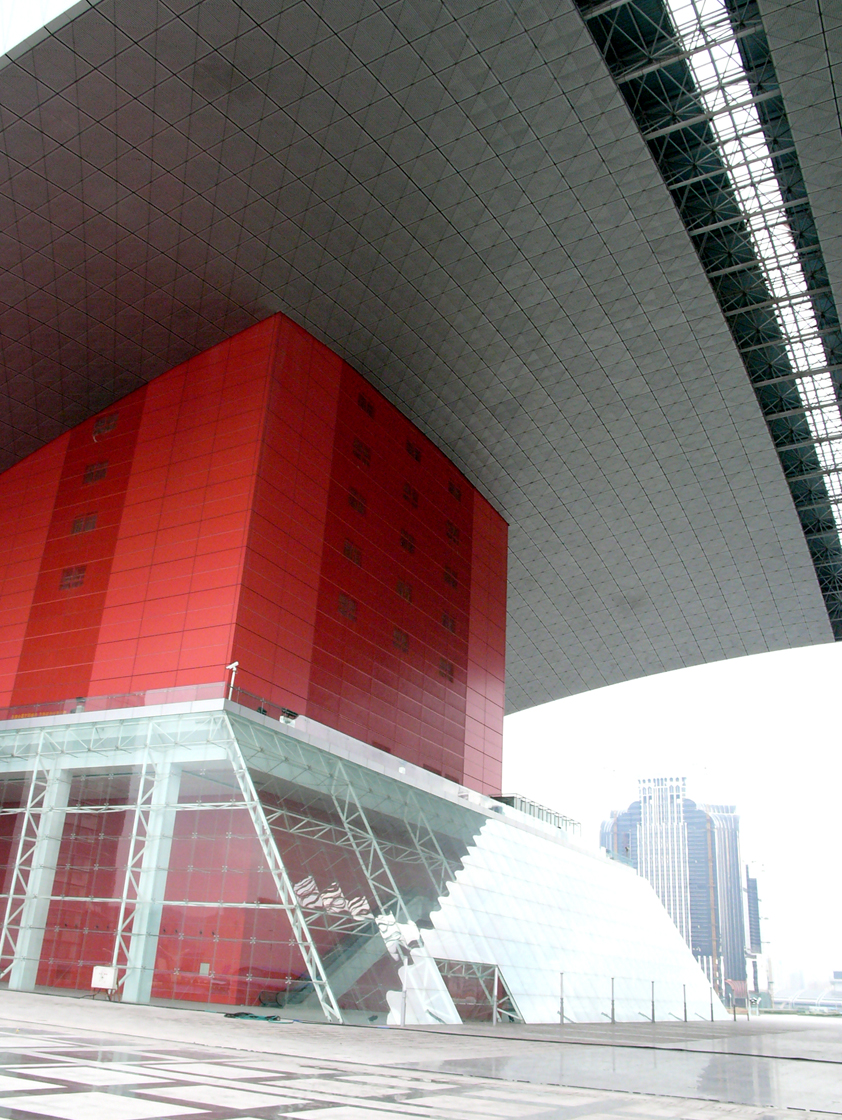
Detail of one tower of the Civic Center.

The Civic Center building and area master plan was designed by the American firm Lee/Timchula Architects, which won the international design competition in 1996. Other full submissions were from Arcurban Design and Management Services, Hyayi Design Consultants and Societe de Conception d'Architecture et d'Urbanisme; 2 other firms decided to not submit designs.

The curved-wing design of the Civic Center is based on a traditional Southern Chinese roof form and reflects Shenzhen's description as the "Eagle City". The Citizen's Center was the first iconic building in the new city center, and the final building was considerably different from the original plans. The long roof truss was built in 1998, but wasn't clad until 2004 due to a lack of funding and difficulty developing the metalwork. The roof was also intended to use solar panels as an energy source but that was removed for cost and maintenance issues.

The design was an important element that unified the various buildings and functions underneath it including meeting halls, offices and other bureaucratic functions.

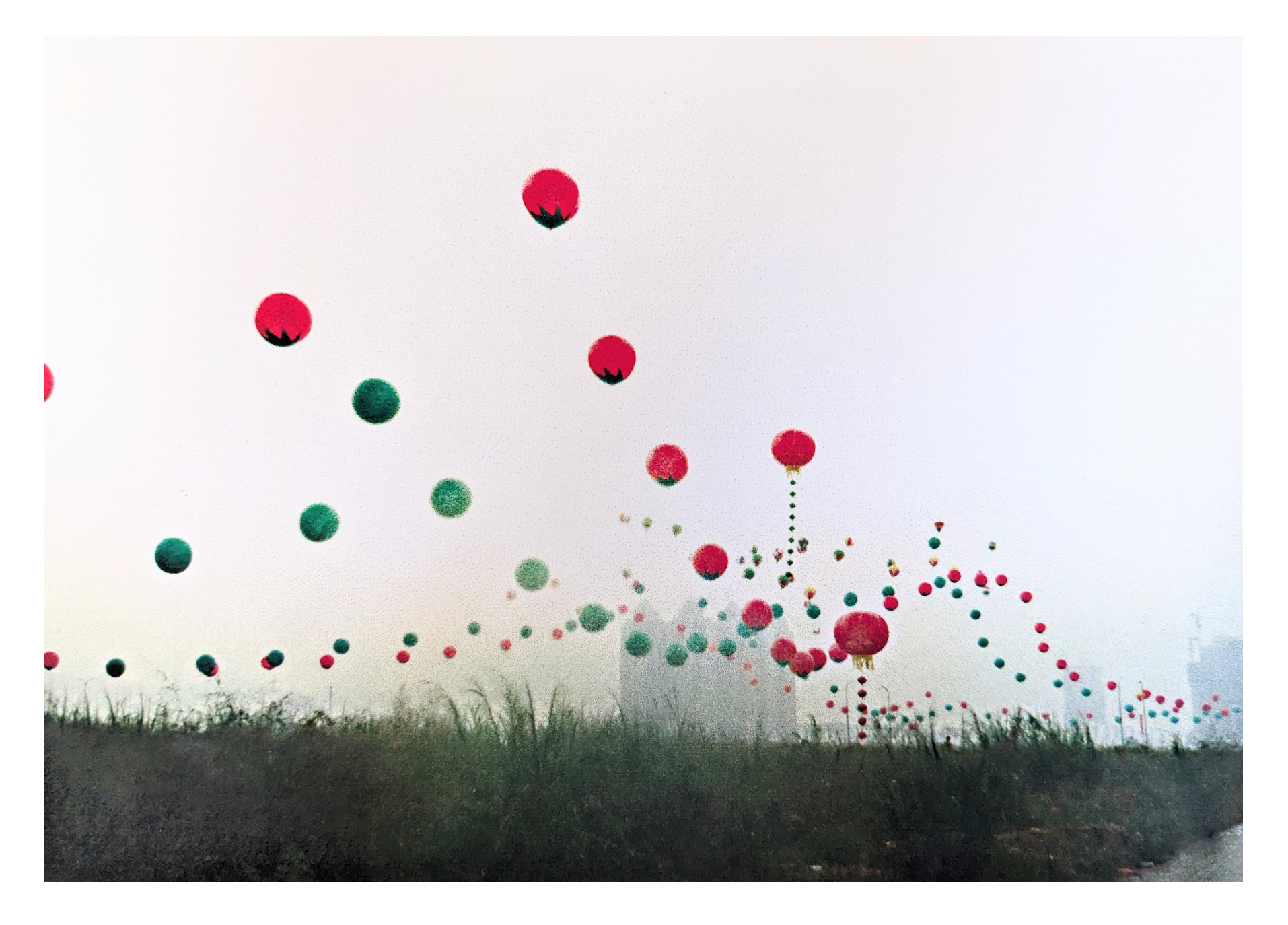
Balloons were used by team as a unique device to assess the impact of the building and roof mass on the central district plan

The building's roof spans 486 meters and has a width of 154 meters. The building is 84.7 meters tall and 200,000 square metres (2,200,000 sq ft). To show scale the architect proposed to use balloons to outline the roof design.

It was the only design that took vehicle traffic into account. The architect was inspired by the West-Side Highway in New York City and the visual pleasure it gives as a distraction and entry point into New York.

== Usage ==
The Citizen's Center Building is a multi-purpose public building with government offices but also contains a technology museum in one tower dedicated to the technical manufacturing of the Shenzhen area. The other tower contains a conference center and auditorium.

The building was also designed to cast a large shade area to protect visitors and workers from inclement weather and the higher heat of summer. It is often used as a popular viewing point for various celebrations and drone and LED light shows.

There are also interior gardens and a vast parkland nearby for pedestrians.

Master Plans

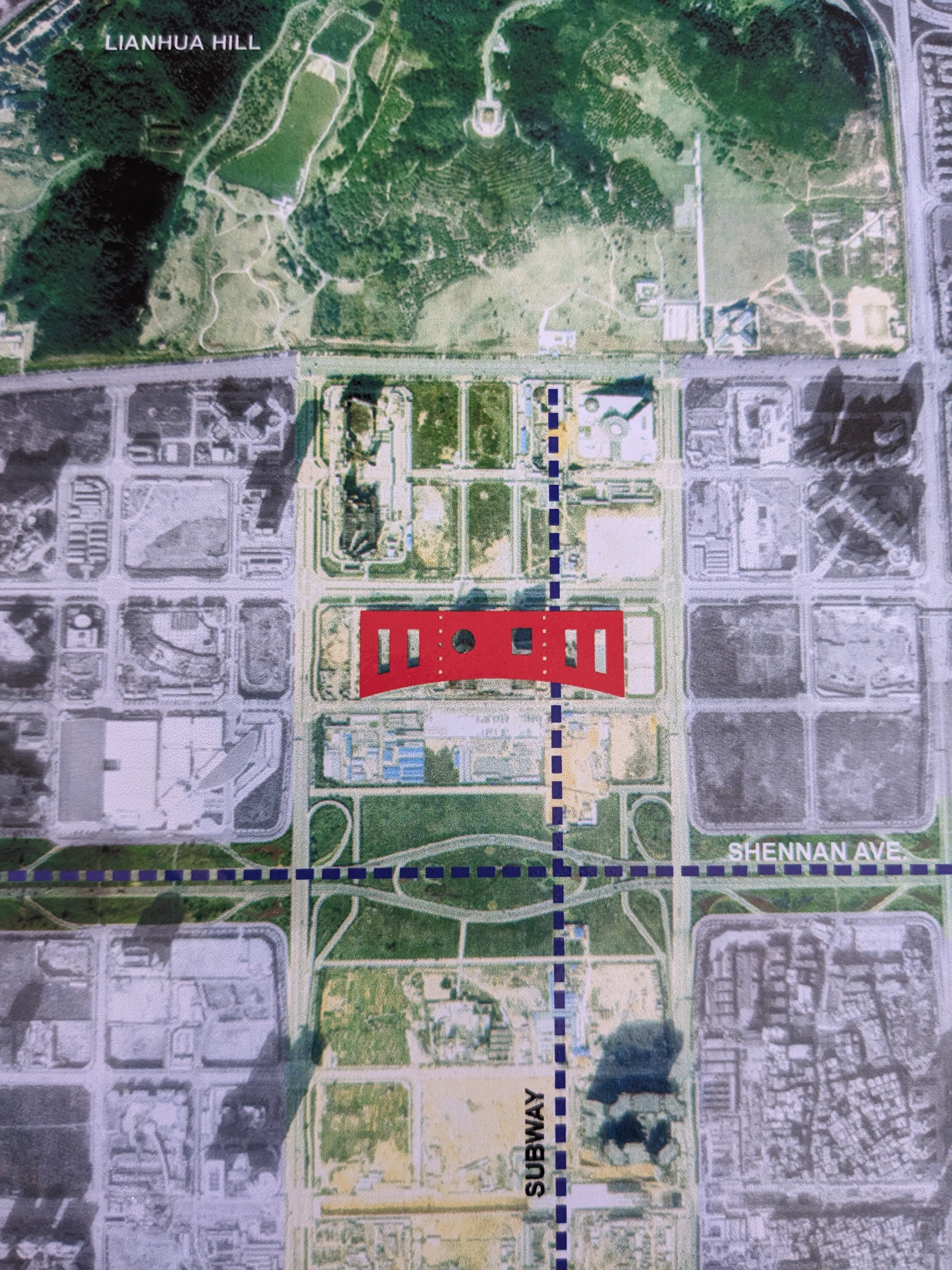
Overview plan shows central axis to Lianhua Hill. Strong central axis design was cited as one of the main reasons the design was chosen. Also, the master plan was flexible enough to accommodate future additions and a variety of different buildings.

Overview of plan without Crystal Palace building

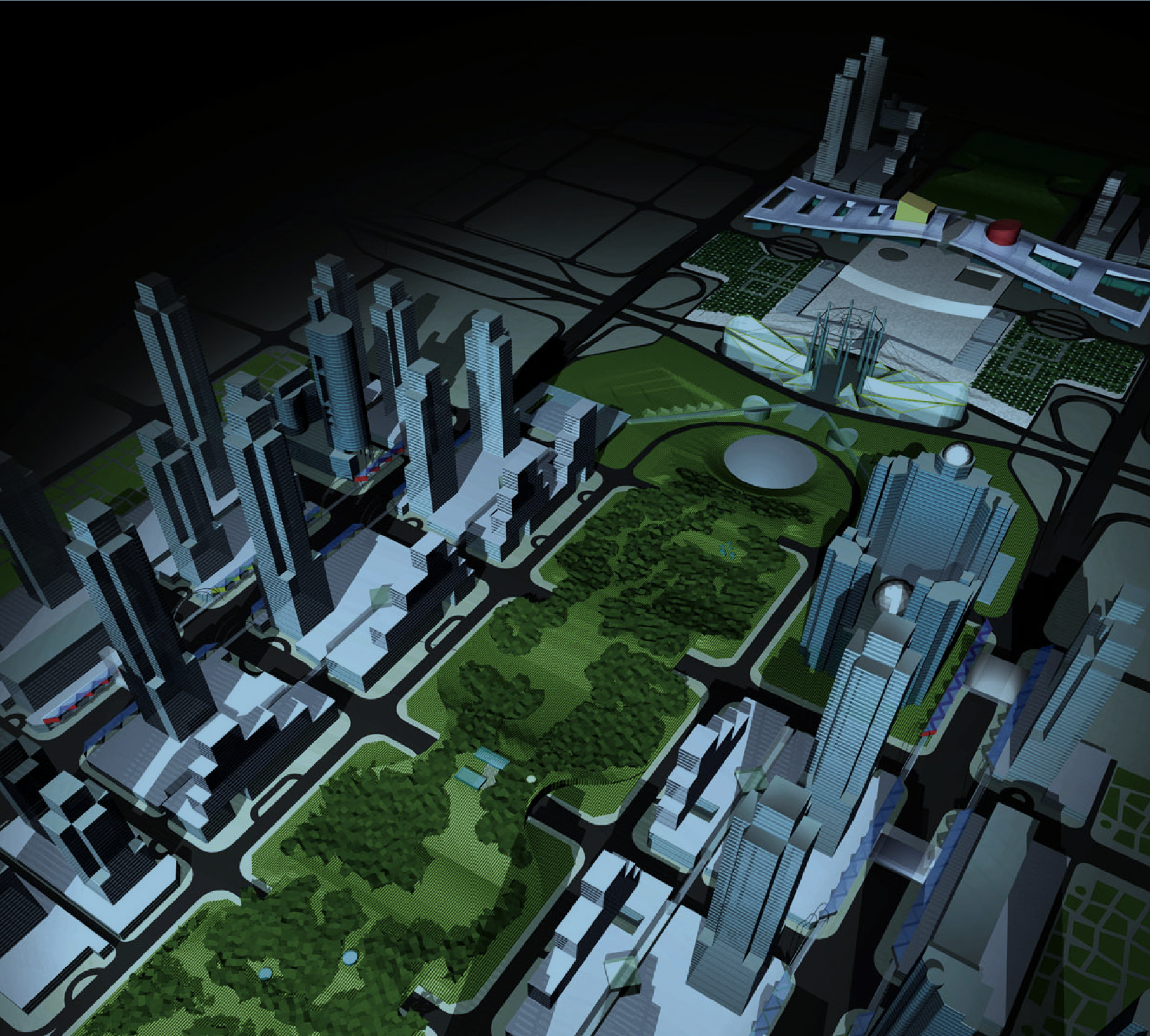
Adjacent to Civic Center was a design for a Crystal Palace art and entertainment center.

Crystal Palace proposal was to add an entertainment focal point

== See also ==
- Civic Center Station, the Shenzhen Metro station serving the building and its surroundings
- Shenzhen Museum, part of which is located within the building
