= Nanshan Cultural and Sports Center =

Sports and cultural venue in Shenzhen, China

Coordinates: 22.5396°N 113.9180°E

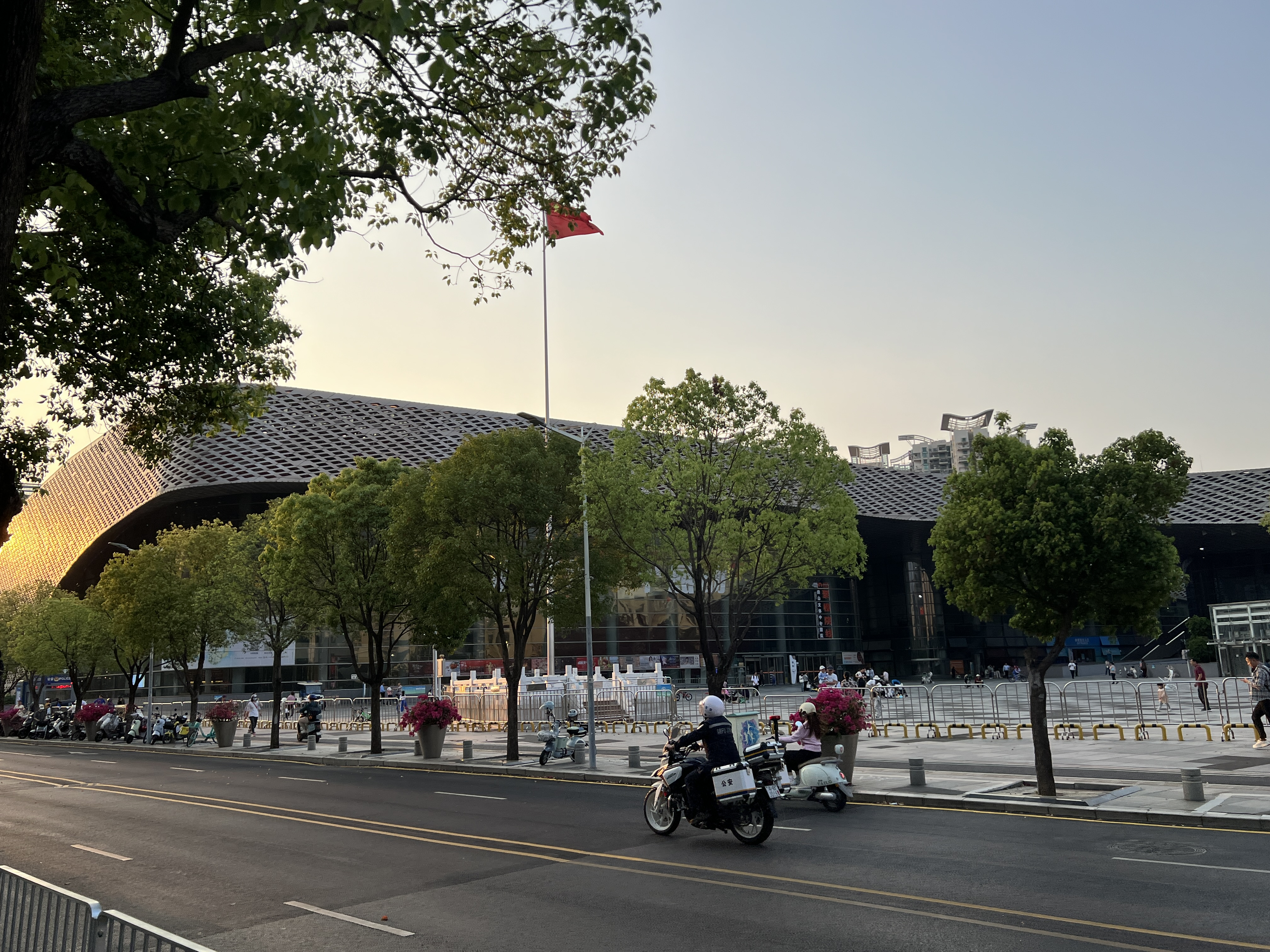
Nanshan Cultural and Sports Center

Nanshan Cultural and Sports Center (Simplified Chinese: 南山文体中心) is a public cultural and sports venue located in Nanshan District, Shenzhen City, Guangdong Province, China. It covers an area of 39,600 square meters, with a total construction area of 78,800 square meters and a project cost of 1 billion yuan. It consists of three parts: a theater, a gymnasium, and a swimming pool, and was put into use in 2014.

== Transportation ==
Located south of Shennan Boulevard, north of Taoyuan Road, west of Nanshan Boulevard, and east of Nanxin Road, it is adjacent to Nanshan District Government, Lixiang Park, Nanshan District Library, and Nanshan District Museum. It is 350 meters from Exit D of Nantou Ancient City station on Metro Line 12, and 500 meters from Exit B of Taoyuan Station on Metro Line 1.
