= He Jingtang =

Chinese architect

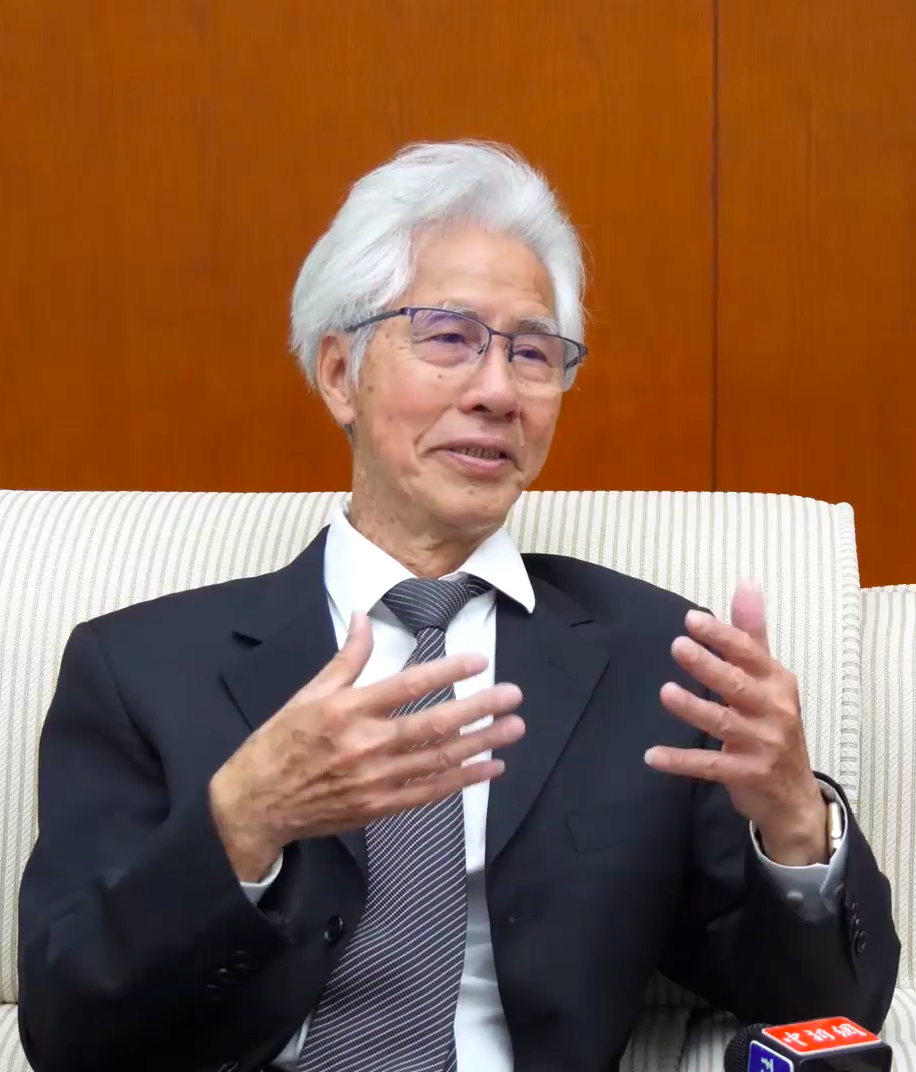
- Born: 1938 (age 86–87); Dongguan, Guangdong, China
- Occupation: Architect

He Jingtang (Chinese: 何镜堂; born 1938 Dongguan) is a Chinese architect and the head of the architecture program at the South China University of Technology's school of architecture whose works include the wrestling and badminton venues built for the 2008 Beijing Olympics and the Chinese Pavilion sometimes referred to as the "Crown of China" for Expo 2010 which was held in Shanghai and later reopened as the China Art Museum. More recently designed the new campus of the University of Macau which was completed in 2013.

In 2016 the Dachang Muslim Cultural Center designed by He opened outside Beijing. It features a colonnade of petal-shaped arches that in turn gave birth to an illuminated walkway around the outline of the cultural centre.

He participated in the 2016 Venice Biennale of Architecture, in an exhibit named "PLACE, CULTURE, TIME He Jingtang: Design for Drastically Changing China".

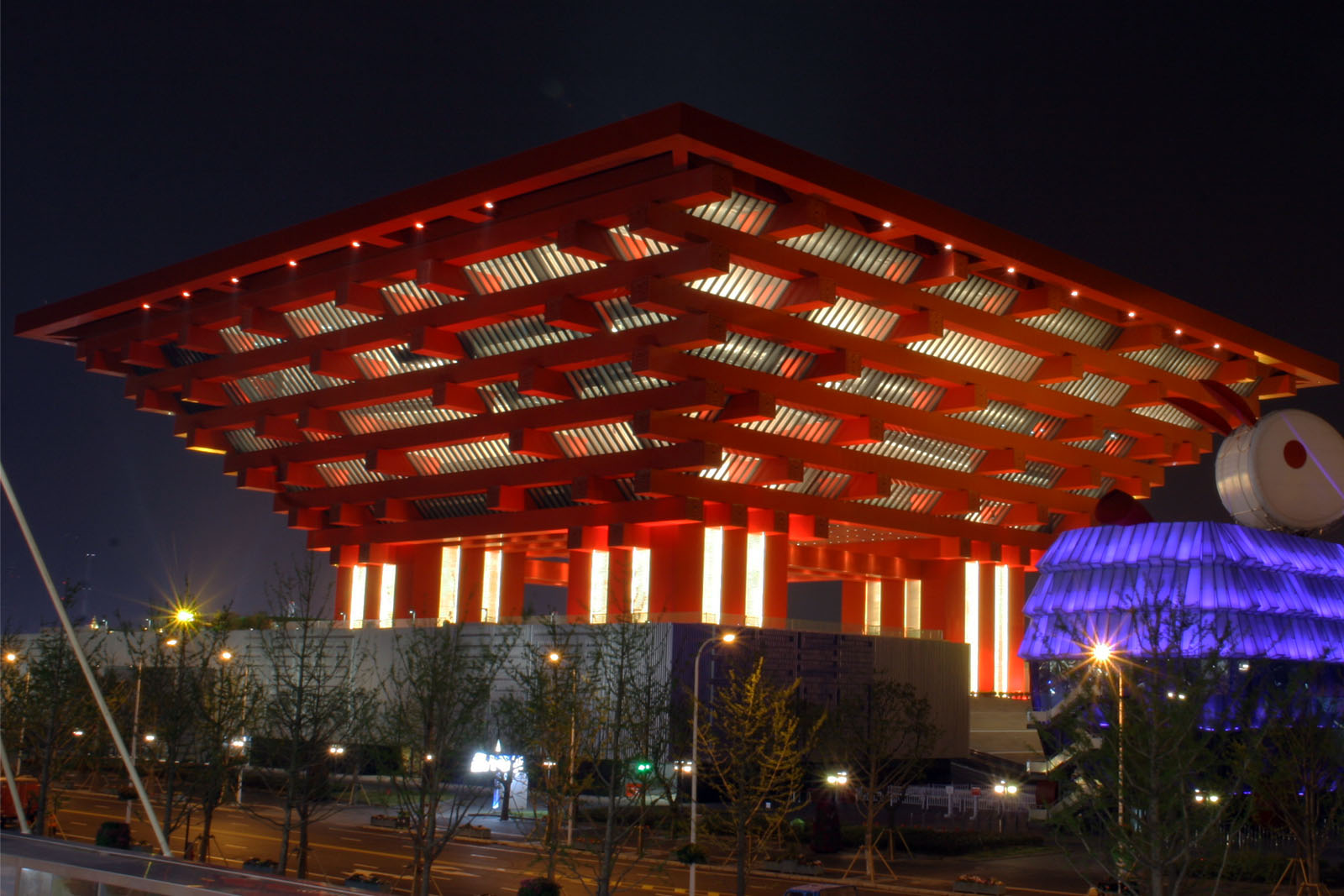
China pavilion at Expo 2010

== Notes ==
- Donghui, Liu (21 January 2010). "2010 Expo: He Jingtang and the China Pavilion". CRIENGLISH.com. Archived from the original on June 26, 2010.
- Xue, Charlie Q. L. (2005). "Portraits of Chinese Architects". Building a revolution: Chinese architecture since 1980. Hong Kong University Press. p. 125. ISBN 978-962-209-744-5.
