= List of Chinese Taipei representatives to APEC =

The Republic of China (Taiwan) joined the Asia-Pacific Economic Cooperation (APEC) in 1991 together with People's Republic of China and British Hong Kong.

The heads of government of all APEC member economies meet annually in a summit called the "APEC Economic Leaders' Meeting", rotating in location among APEC's member economies. However, owing to the nature of the Economic Forum of APEC and the One China policy, the president of the Republic of China is not allowed to appear in APEC and thus appoints a special envoy every year to attend the APEC meeting under the name Chinese Taipei.

== List ==
Year	Representative	President	Capacity as representative	Other official office(s) held	Former official office(s) held
1993	Vincent Siew	Lee Teng-hui	Chairman for Economic Planning Development	Minister without Portfolio	Minister of Economic Affairs (1990–1993)
1994	Vincent Siew	Lee Teng-hui	Chairman for Economic Planning Development	Minister without Portfolio	Minister of Economic Affairs (1990–1993)
1995	Koo Chen-fu	Lee Teng-hui	Senior Advisor to the President	Chairman, SEF	National Policy Advisor (1988–1991)
1996	Koo Chen-fu	Lee Teng-hui	Senior Advisor to the President	Chairman, SEF	National Policy Advisor (1988–1991)
1997	Koo Chen-fu	Lee Teng-hui	Senior Advisor to the President	Chairman, SEF	National Policy Advisor (1988–1991)
1998	Chiang Pin-kung	Lee Teng-hui	Chairman for Economic Planning Development	Minister without Portfolio	Minister of Economic Affairs (1993–1996)
1999	Chiang Pin-kung	Lee Teng-hui	Chairman for Economic Planning Development	Minister without Portfolio	Minister of Economic Affairs (1993–1996)
2000	Perng Fai-nan	Chen Shui-bian	Representative of the Economic Leader	Governor, Central Bank of the Republic of China (Taiwan)	
2001	none, boycott				
2002	Yuan T. Lee	Chen Shui-bian	Representative of the Economic Leader	President, Academia Sinica	National Policy Advisor (1991–1994)
2003	Yuan T. Lee	Chen Shui-bian	Representative of the Economic Leader	President, Academia Sinica	National Policy Advisor (1991–1994)
2004	Yuan T. Lee	Chen Shui-bian	Representative of the Economic Leader	President, Academia Sinica	National Policy Advisor (1991–1994)
2005	Lin Hsin-i	Chen Shui-bian	Senior Advisor to the President	Chairman, ITRI	Minister of Economic Affairs (2000 – 2002), Vice Premier, Minister of Economic Planning and Development (2002 – 2004)
2006	Morris Chang	Chen Shui-bian	Senior Advisor to the President		
2007	Stan Shih	Chen Shui-bian	Senior Advisor to the President		Co-founder, chairman of Acer Inc.
2008	Lien Chan	Ma Ying-jeou	Representative of the Economic Leader		Vice President (1996–2000), Premier (1993–1997)
2009	Lien Chan	Ma Ying-jeou	Representative of the Economic Leader		Vice President (1996–2000), Premier (1993–1997)
2010	Lien Chan	Ma Ying-jeou	Representative of the Economic Leader		Vice President (1996–2000), Premier (1993–1997)
2011	Lien Chan	Ma Ying-jeou	Representative of the Economic Leader		Vice President (1996–2000), Premier (1993–1997)
2012	Lien Chan	Ma Ying-jeou	Representative of the Economic Leader		Vice President (1996–2000), Premier (1993–1997)
2013	Vincent Siew	Ma Ying-jeou	Representative of the Economic Leader		Vice President (2008–2012), Premier (1997–2000)
2014	Vincent Siew	Ma Ying-jeou	Representative of the Economic Leader		Vice President (2008–2012), Premier (1997–2000)
2015	Vincent Siew	Ma Ying-jeou	Representative of the Economic Leader		Vice President (2008–2012), Premier (1997–2000)
2016	James Soong	Tsai Ing-wen	Senior Advisor to the President		Governor of Taiwan Province (1993–1998)
2017	James Soong	Tsai Ing-wen	Senior Advisor to the President		Governor of Taiwan Province (1993–1998)
2018	Morris Chang	Tsai Ing-wen	Senior Advisor to the President		Founder, chairman and CEO, Taiwan Semiconductor Manufacturing Company (TSMC)
2019	Morris Chang	Tsai Ing-wen	Senior Advisor to the President		Founder, chairman and CEO, Taiwan Semiconductor Manufacturing Company (TSMC)
2020	Morris Chang	Tsai Ing-wen	Senior Advisor to the President		Founder, chairman and CEO, Taiwan Semiconductor Manufacturing Company (TSMC)
2021	Morris Chang	Tsai Ing-wen	Senior Advisor to the President		Founder, chairman and CEO, Taiwan Semiconductor Manufacturing Company (TSMC)
2022	Morris Chang	Tsai Ing-wen	Senior Advisor to the President		Founder, chairman and CEO, Taiwan Semiconductor Manufacturing Company (TSMC)
2023	Morris Chang	Tsai Ing-wen	Senior Advisor to the President		Founder, chairman and CEO, Taiwan Semiconductor Manufacturing Company (TSMC)
2024	Lin Hsin-i	Lai Ching-te	Senior Advisor to the President	Chairman, ITRI	Minister of Economic Affairs (2000 – 2002), Vice Premier, Minister of Economic Planning and Development (2002 – 2004)
2025	Lin Hsin-i	Lai Ching-te	Senior Advisor to the President	Chairman, ITRI	Minister of Economic Affairs (2000 – 2002), Vice Premier, Minister of Economic Planning and Development (2002 – 2004)
2026	Stan Shih	Lai Ching-te	Senior Advisor to the President		Co-founder, chairman of Acer Inc.

== Galleries ==
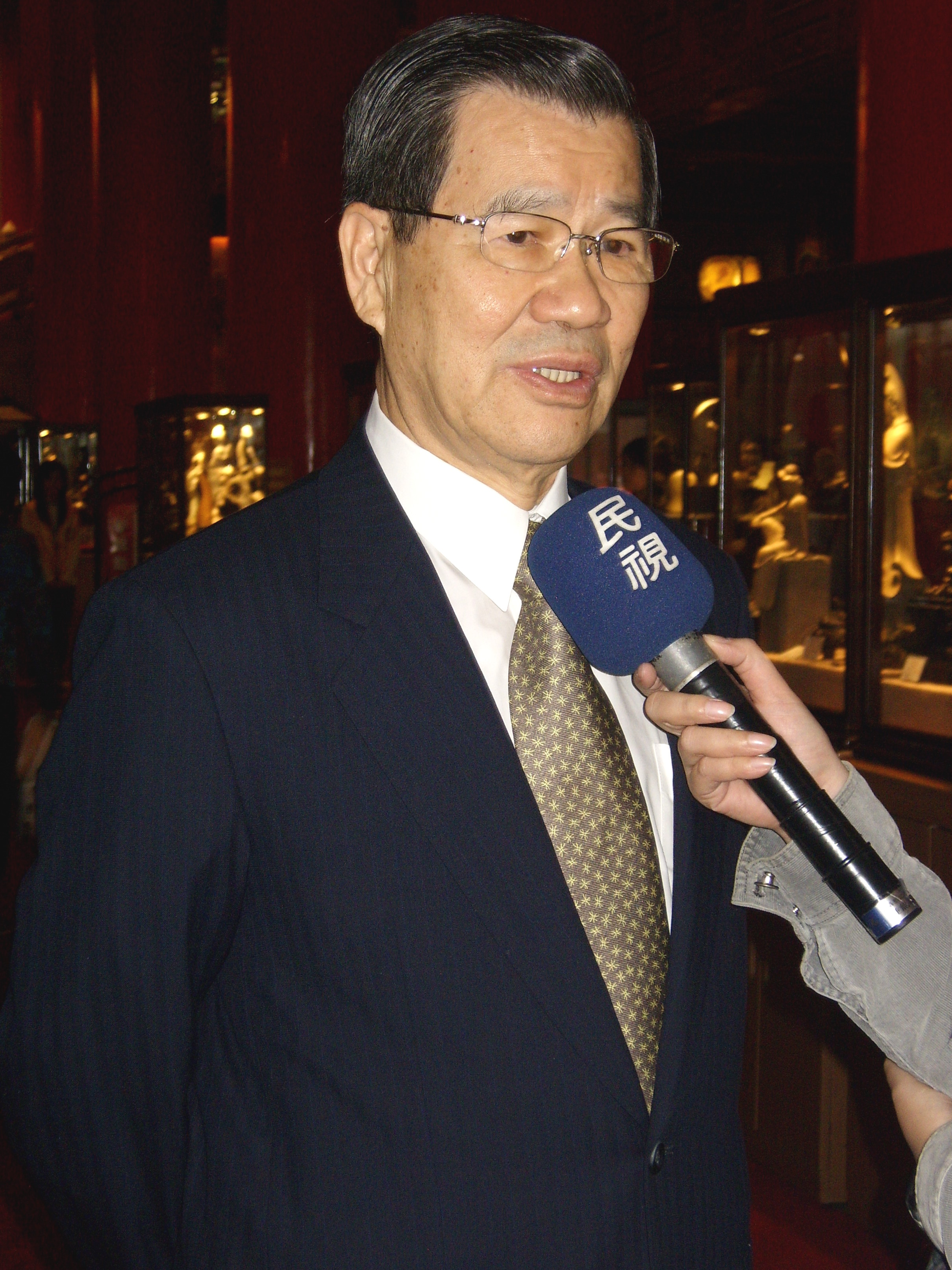
Vincent Siew

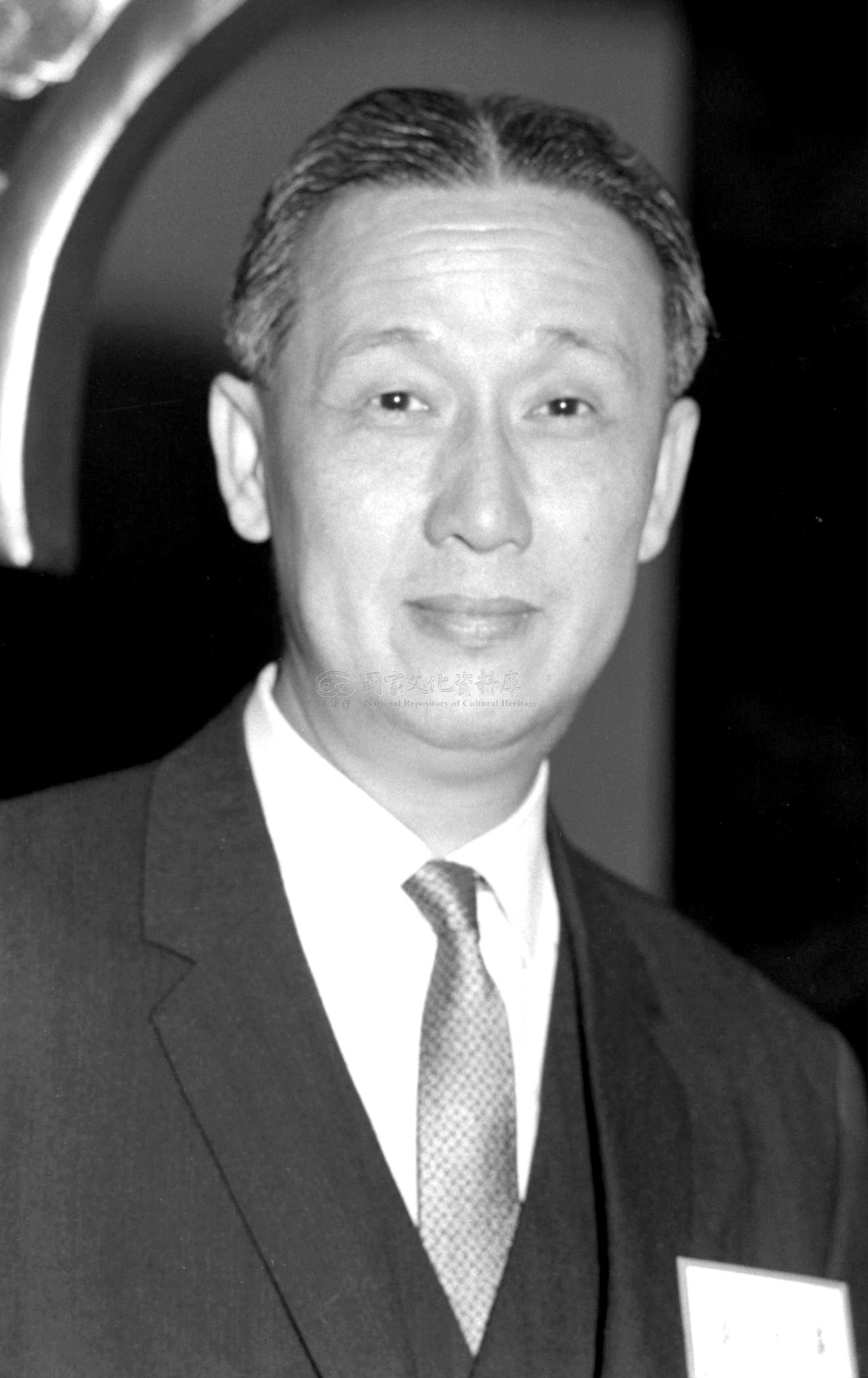
Koo Chen-fu

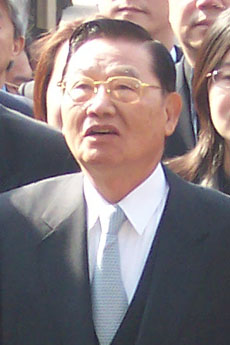
Chiang Pin-kung

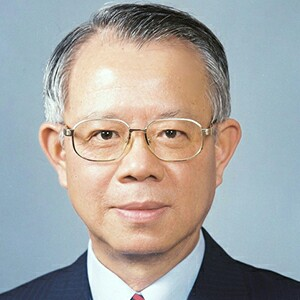
Perng Fai-nan

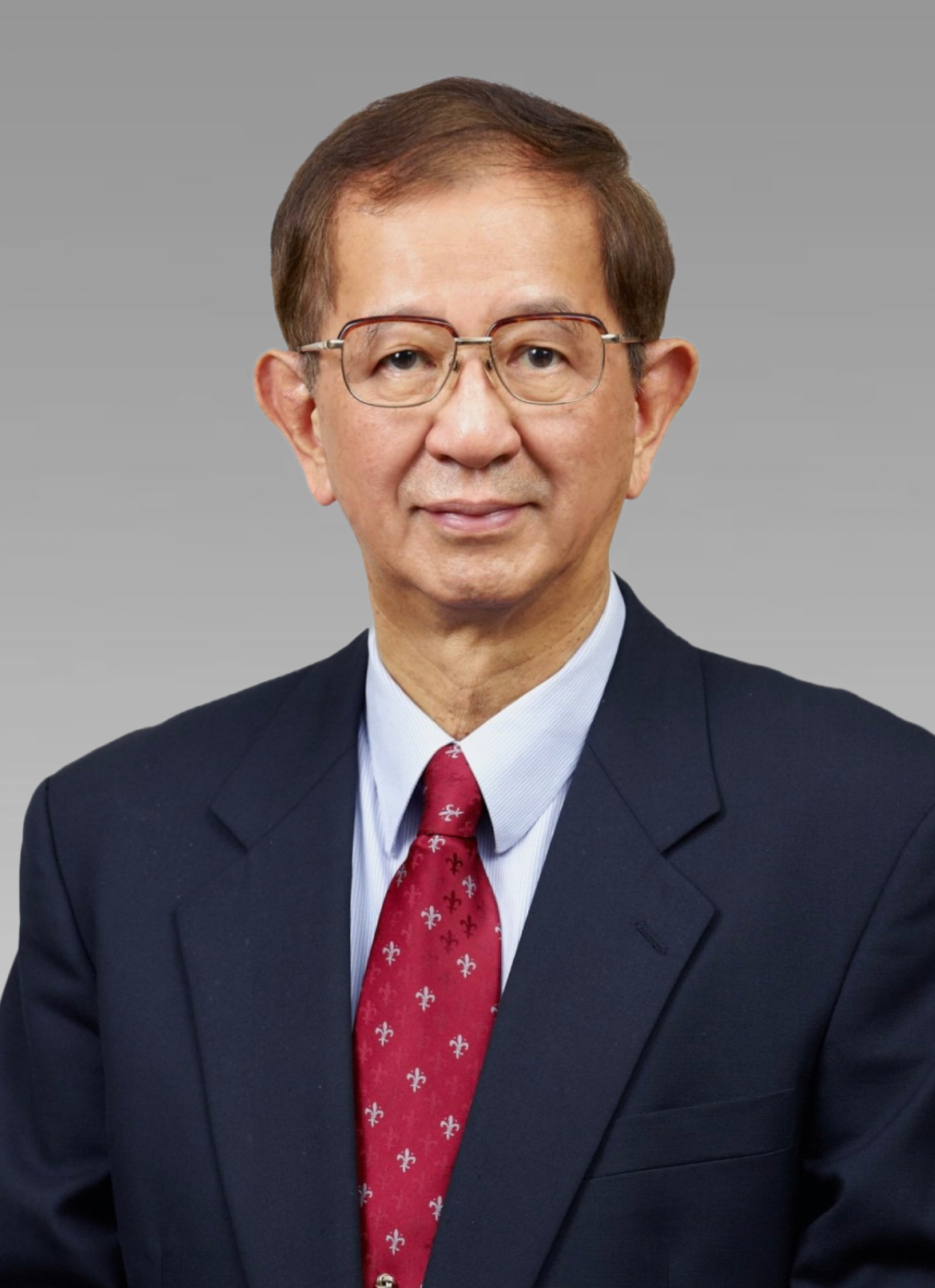
Yuan T. Lee

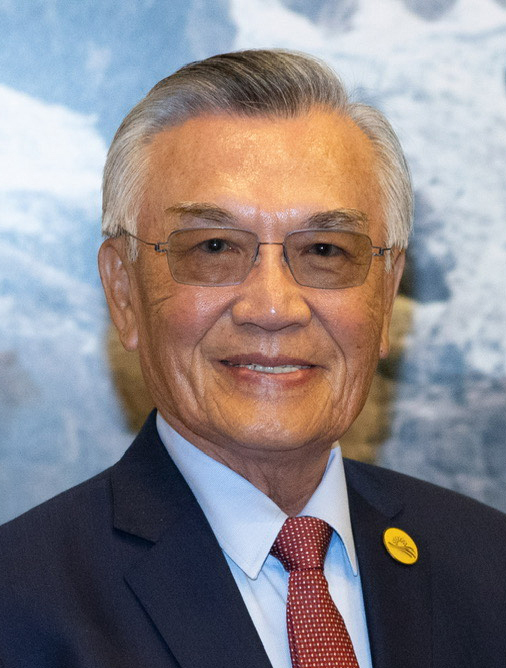
Lin Hsin-i

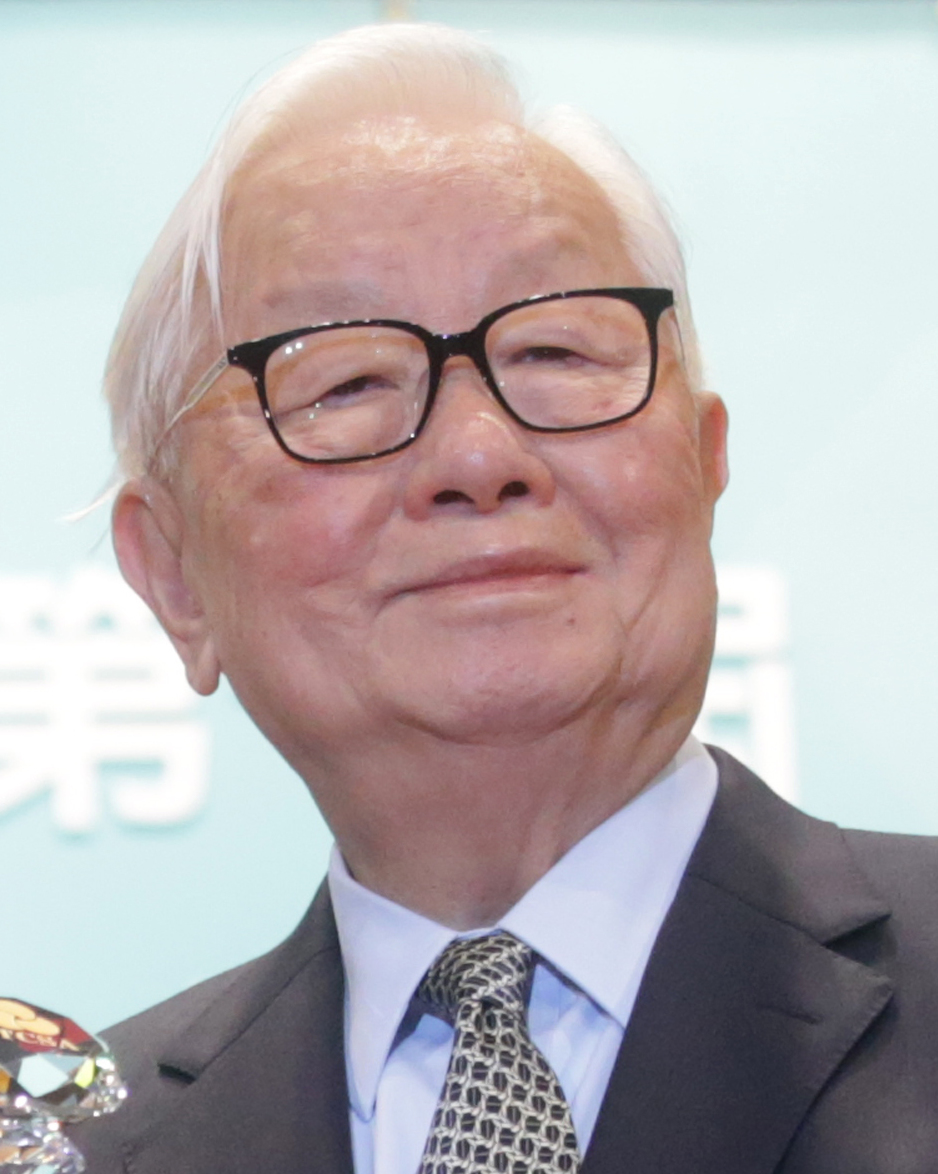
Morris Chang

Stan Shih

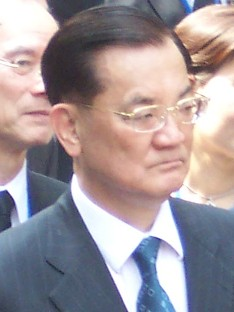
Lien Chan

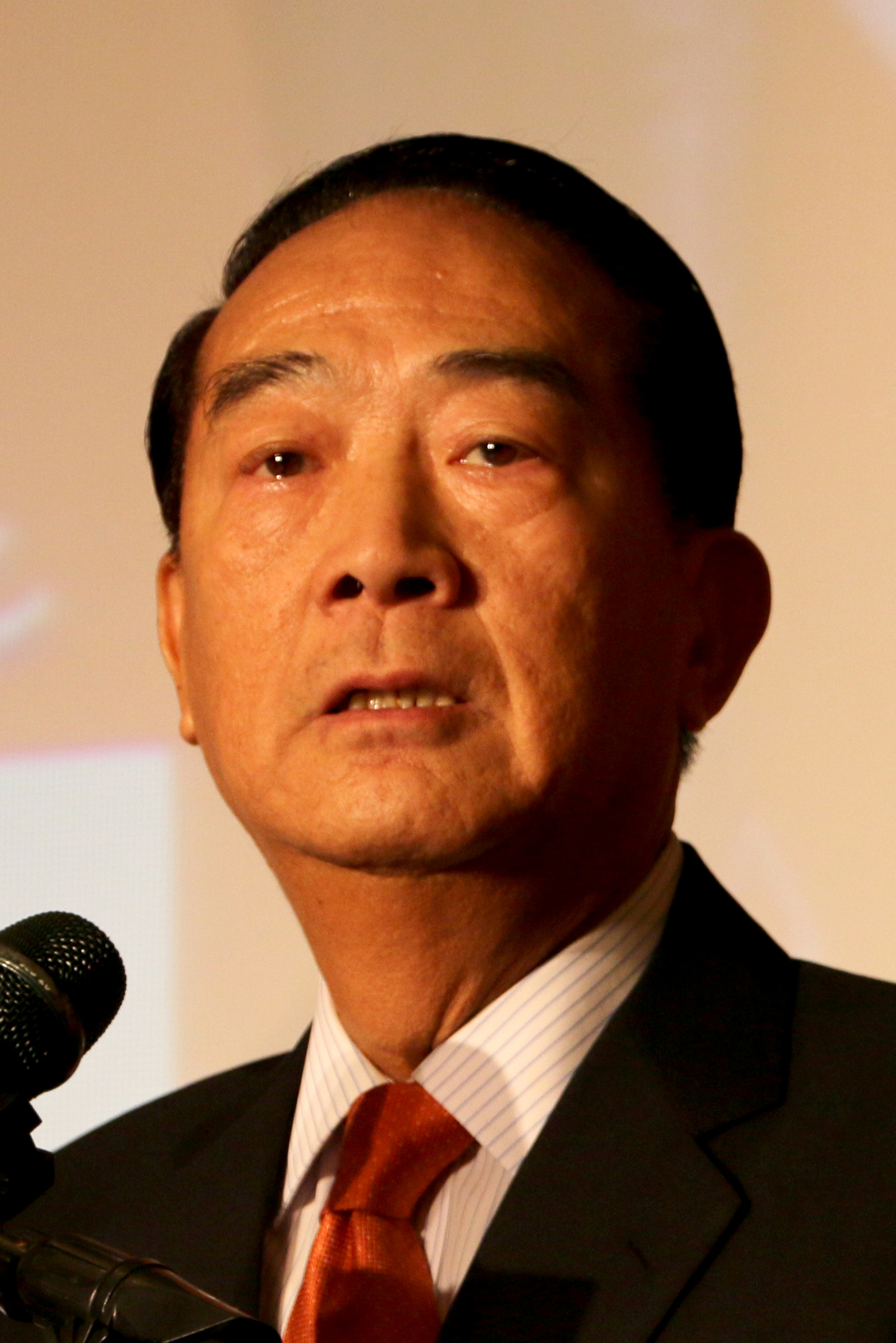
James Soong

== Notes ==
1. Leadership in semi-governmental organizations are classified here as "official offices."
2. President Chen Shui-bian had appointed former Vice President Li Yuan-zu as his envoy, but the PRC, which was hosting the summit, objected to his choice and the Chinese Taipei delegation decided to boycott.
3. President Chen's original choice of Legislative Yuan President Wang Jin-pyng was rejected by the host South Korea. Chen also applied to attend personally but was denied his request.
4. President Chen's original choice of former Vice Premier Tsai Ing-wen was rejected by Australia because of her alleged involvement in formulating the "One Country on Each Side" theory.

== See also ==
- Asia-Pacific Economic Cooperation
- Taipei
- Taiwan
