= APEC New Zealand 2021 =

Asia-Pacific economic summit

- Host country: New Zealand
- Date: 12 November 2021
- Motto: Join, Work, Grow. Together. (Māori: Haumi ē, Hui ē, Tāiki ē.)
- Venues: Auckland and various locations virtually
- Follows: APEC Malaysia 2020
- Precedes: APEC Thailand 2022
- Website: apec2021nz.org (archived)

APEC New Zealand 2021 was the year-long hosting of Asia-Pacific Economic Cooperation (APEC) meetings in New Zealand from December 2020 until November 2021. Due to the COVID-19 pandemic, it was the second consecutive year that all of the meetings were held virtually, including the culminating Economic Leaders' Meeting.

This was New Zealand's second time hosting an APEC meeting, having hosted one in 1999.

After the virtual summit held on 12 November 2021, the APEC leaders issued the Auckland Declaration.

== Theme ==
The official theme of the APEC New Zealand 2021 is "Join, Work, Grow. Together." It was chosen to reflect the Asia Pacific region's ability of work together through the COVID-19 pandemic.

== Logo ==
APEC New Zealand 2021 logo is an image of New Zealand's national plant, Alsophila dealbata, known locally as silver fern.

== Events ==
=== Participants ===
This was the first APEC Meeting for United States President Joe Biden, Peruvian President Pedro Castillo, Malaysian Prime Minister Ismail Sabri Yaakob and Japanese Prime Minister Fumio Kishida after their inaugurations and appointments on 20 January 2021, 28 July 2021, 21 August 2021, and 4 October 2021, respectively. It was also the first APEC meeting for Nguyễn Xuân Phúc as Vietnamese President, who took office on 5 April 2021, and attended the previous year as Vietnamese Prime Minister. It was also the last APEC meeting for Chilean President Sebastian Piñera, South Korean President Moon Jae-in, Philippine President Rodrigo Duterte, Peruvian President Pedro Castillo, Hong Kong Chief Executive Carrie Lam, and Australian Prime Minister Scott Morrison who stepped down on 11 March 2022 (following the 2021 Chilean election), 9 May 2022 (following the 2022 South Korean presidential election), 30 June 2022 (following the 2022 Philippine presidential election and the inauguration of Bongbong Marcos), 7 December 2022 (following the 2022 Peruvian self-coup attempt; he would later skip next year's meeting), 1 July 2022 (following the 2022 Hong Kong election), and 23 May 2022 (following the 2022 Australian federal election), respectively.

One president who did not attend was Mexican President Andrés Manuel López Obrador. López Obrador was represented by his Secretary of Economy Tatiana Clouthier.

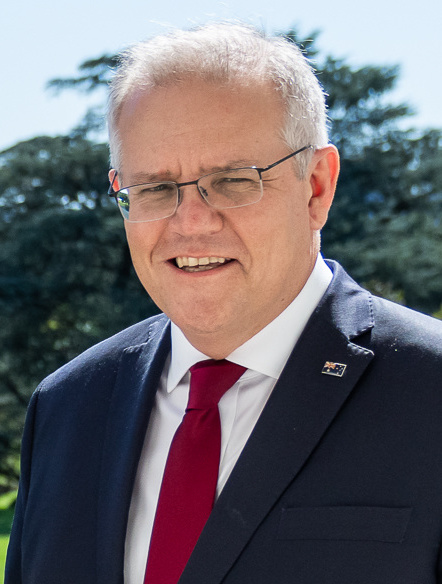
Australia
Scott Morrison,
Prime Minister

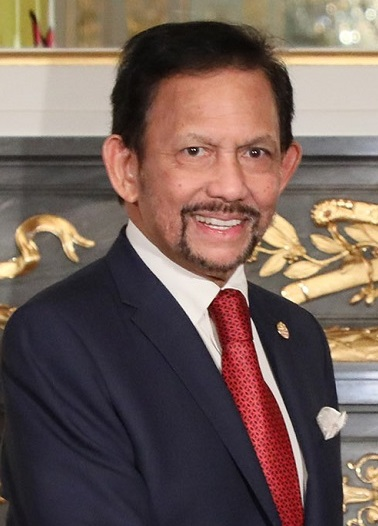
Brunei
Hassanal Bolkiah,
Sultan

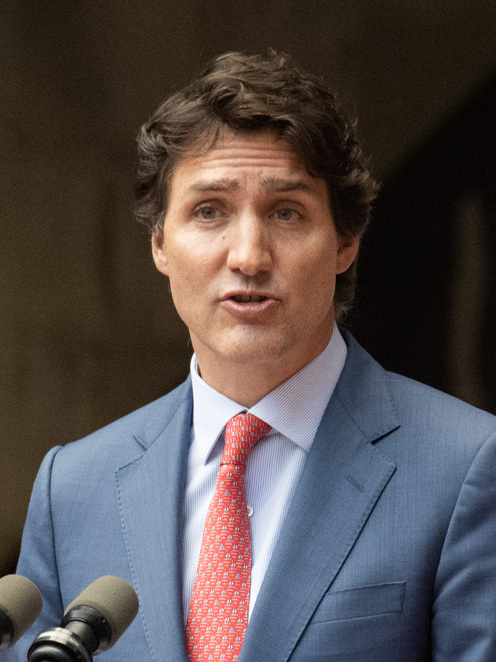
Canada
Justin Trudeau,
Prime Minister

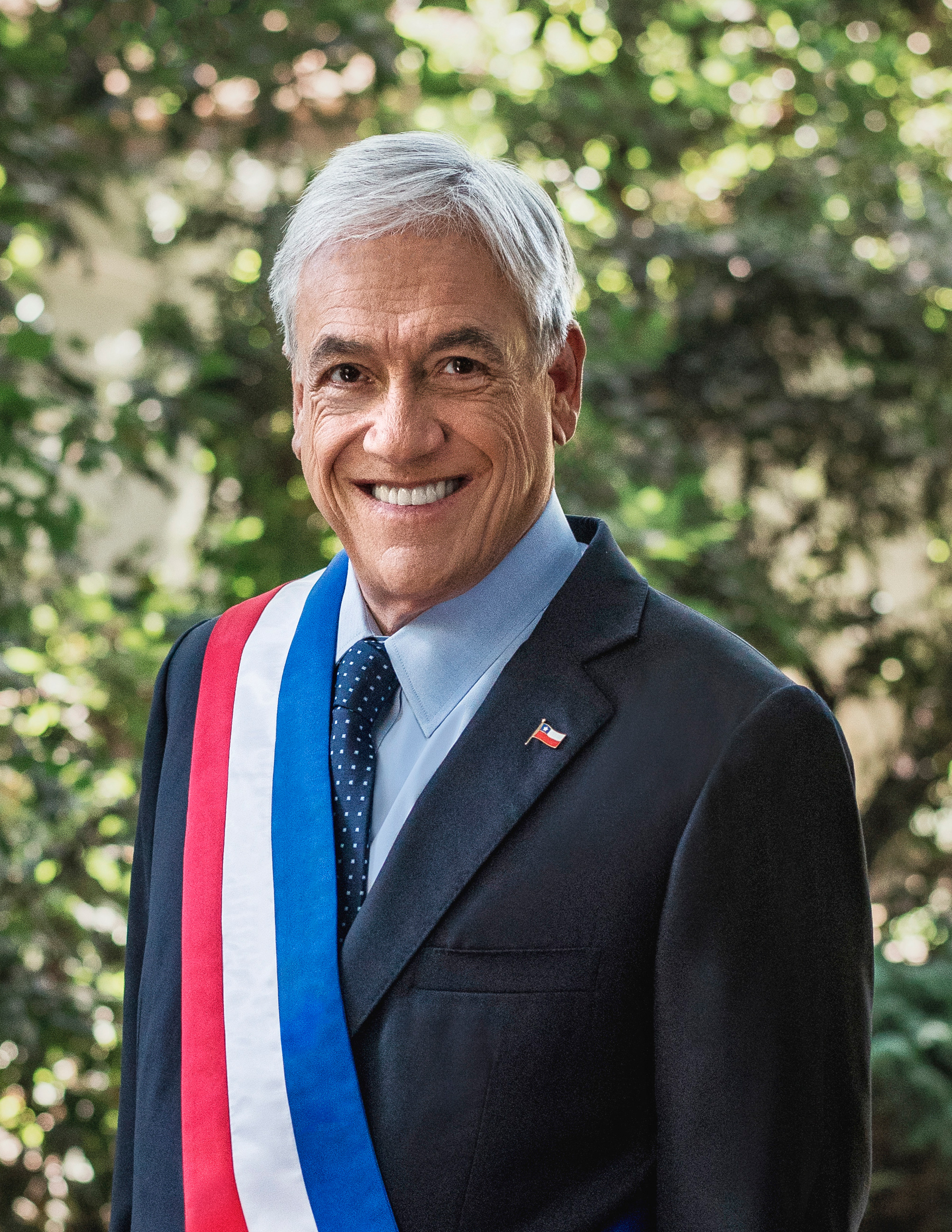
Chile
Sebastián Piñera,
President

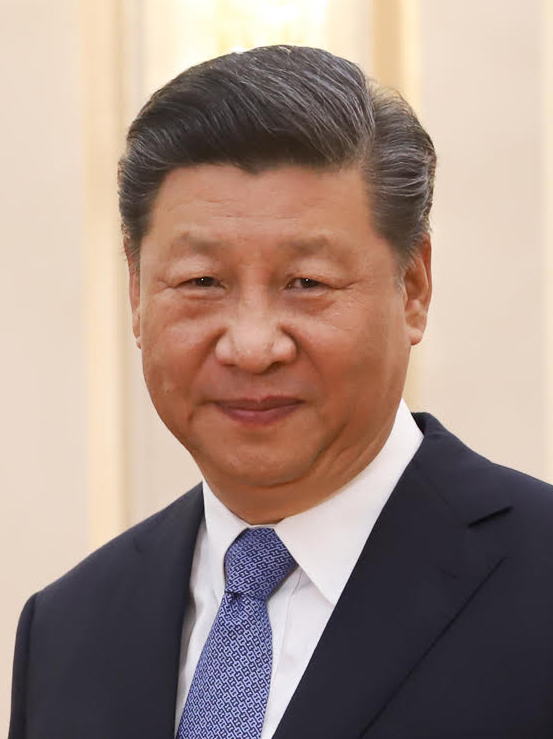
China
Xi Jinping,
President (Note: The President of China is legally a ceremonial office, but the General Secretary of the Chinese Communist Party (de facto leader in one-party communist state) has always held this office since 1993 except for the months of transition, and the current general secretary is Xi Jinping, who is also the Chinese President.)

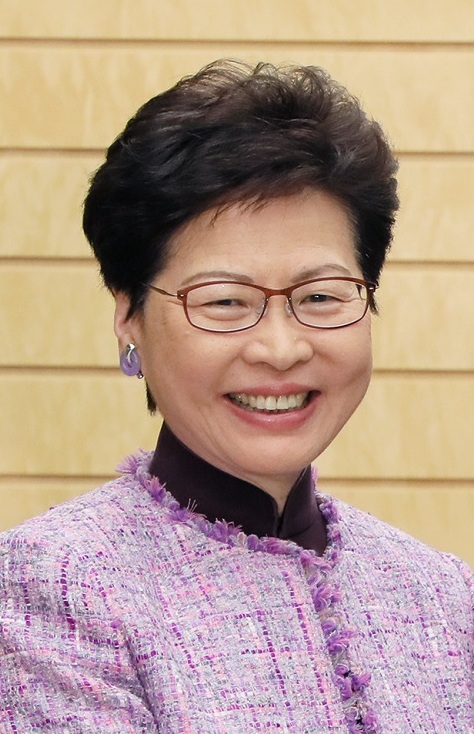
Hong Kong
Carrie Lam,
Chief Executive

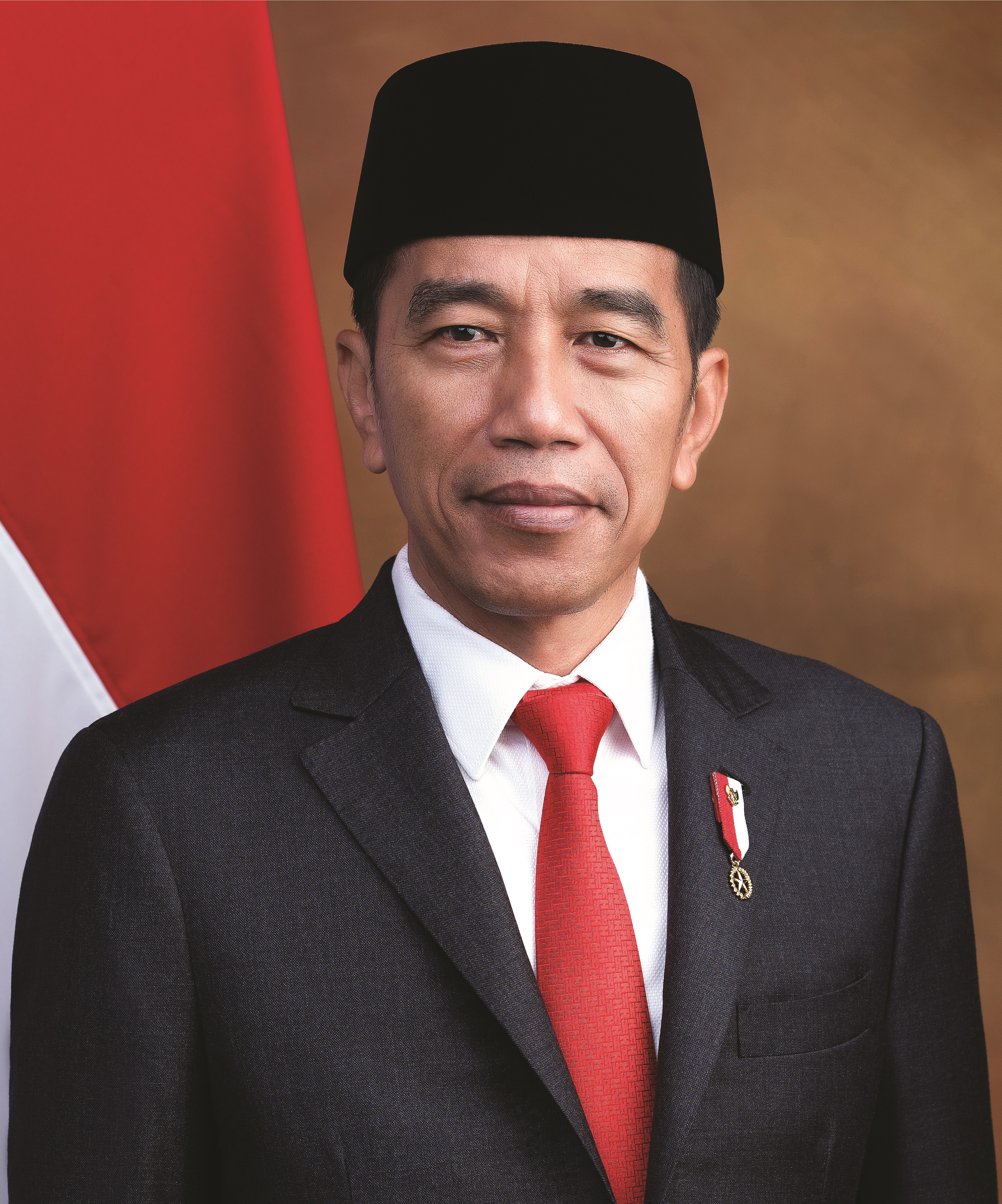
Indonesia
Joko Widodo,
President

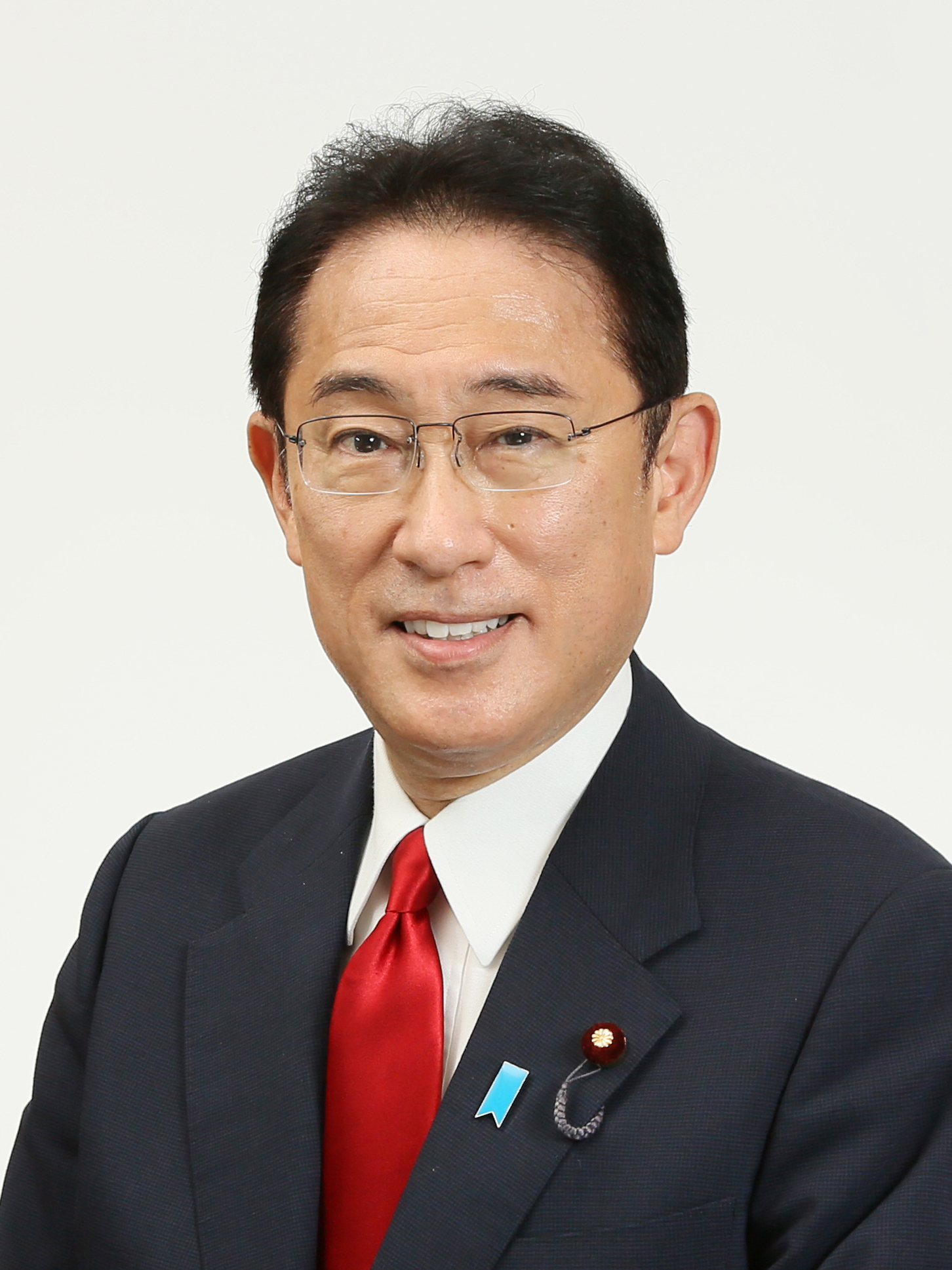
Japan
Fumio Kishida,
Prime Minister

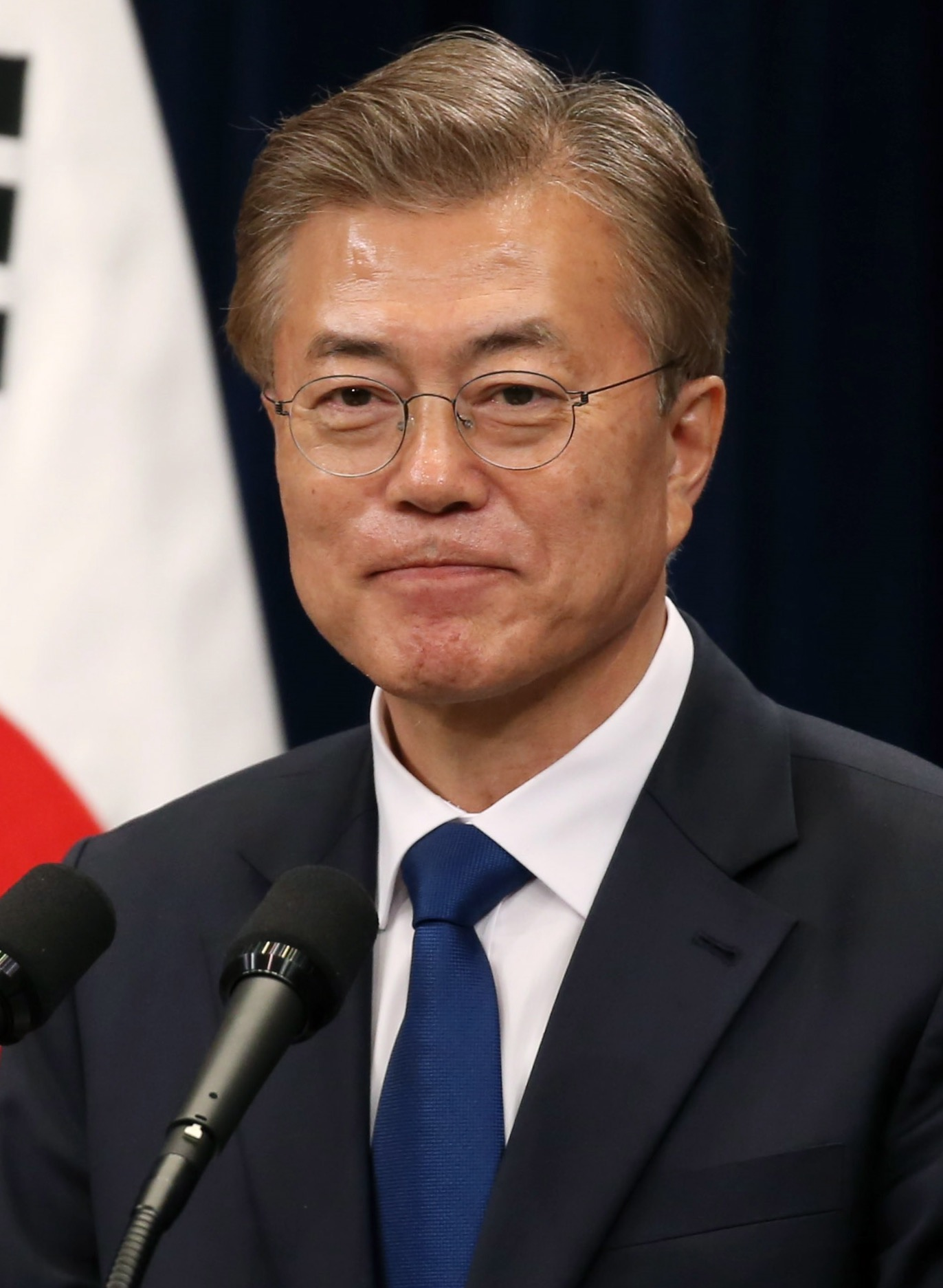
South Korea
Moon Jae-in,
President

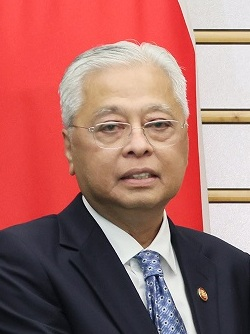
Malaysia
Ismail Sabri Yaakob,
Prime Minister

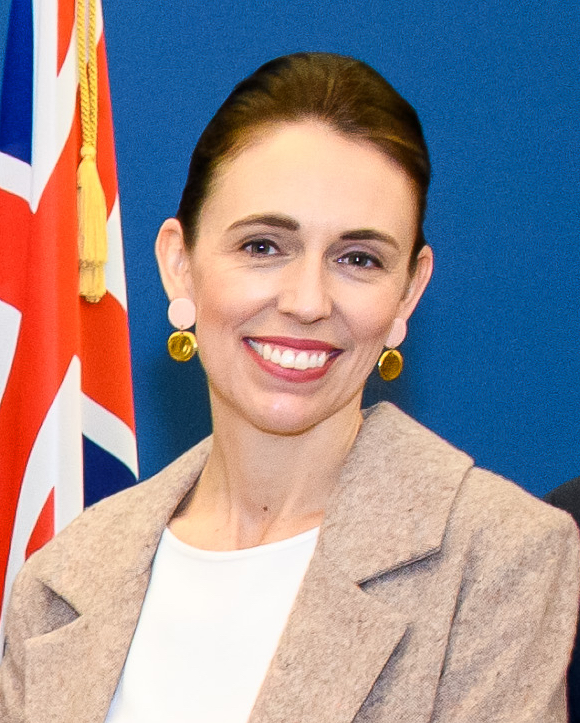
New Zealand
Jacinda Ardern,
Prime Minister (Host)

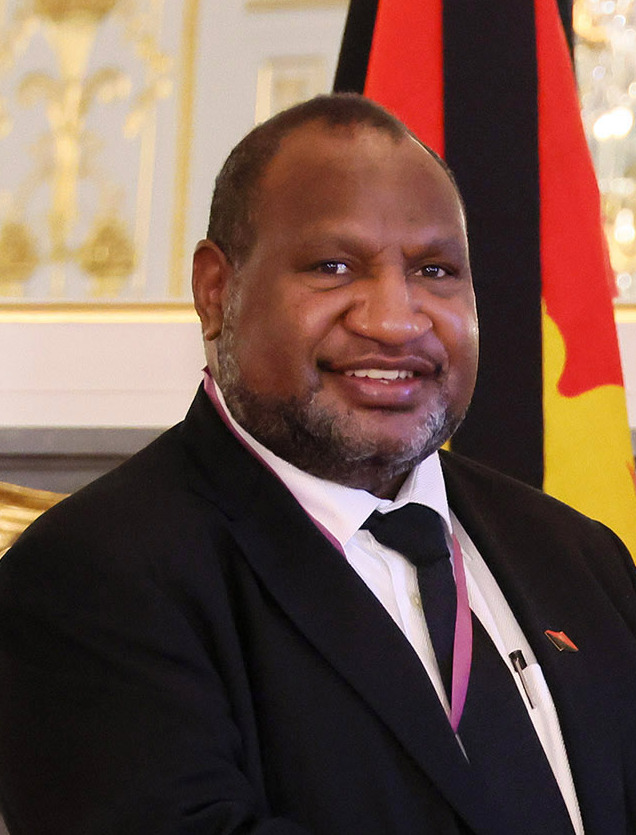
Papua New Guinea
James Marape,
Prime Minister

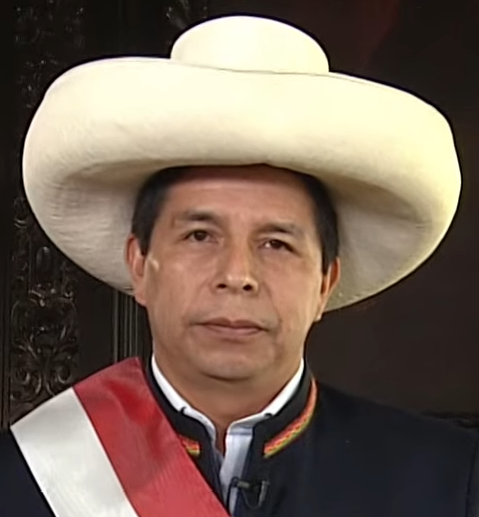
Peru
Pedro Castillo,
President

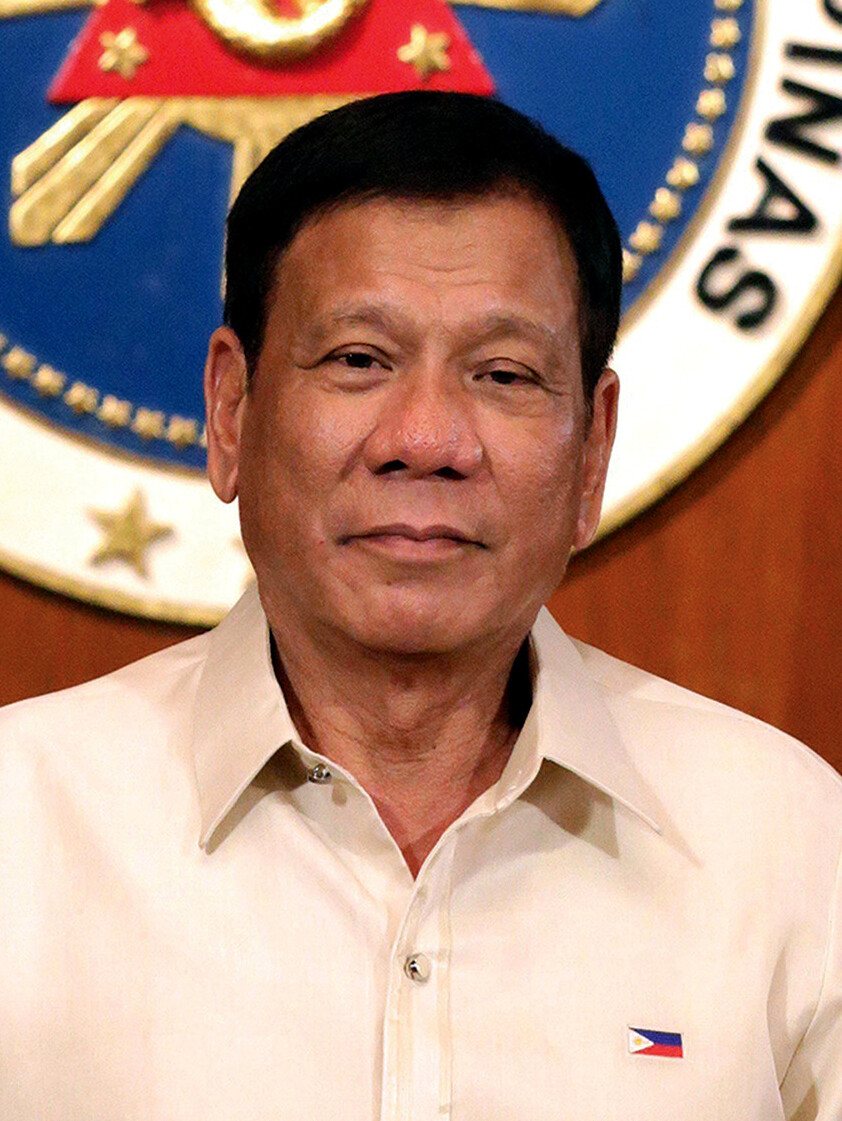
Philippines
Rodrigo Duterte,
President

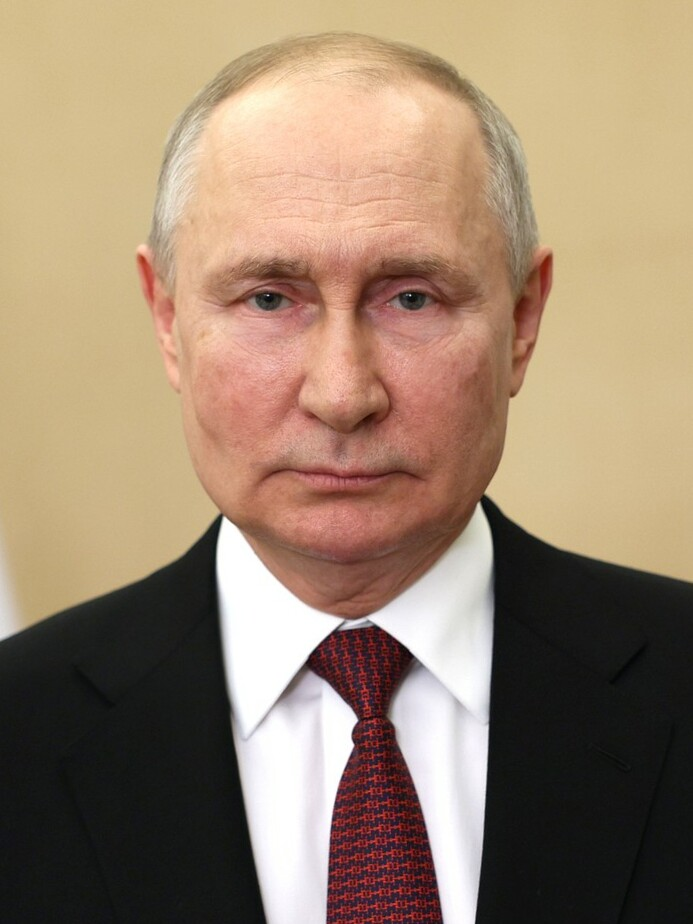
Russia
Vladimir Putin,
President

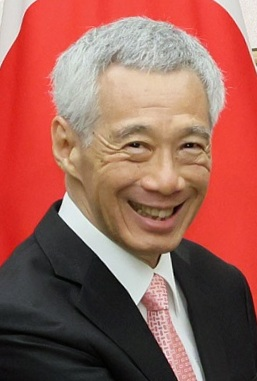
Singapore
Lee Hsien Loong,
Prime Minister

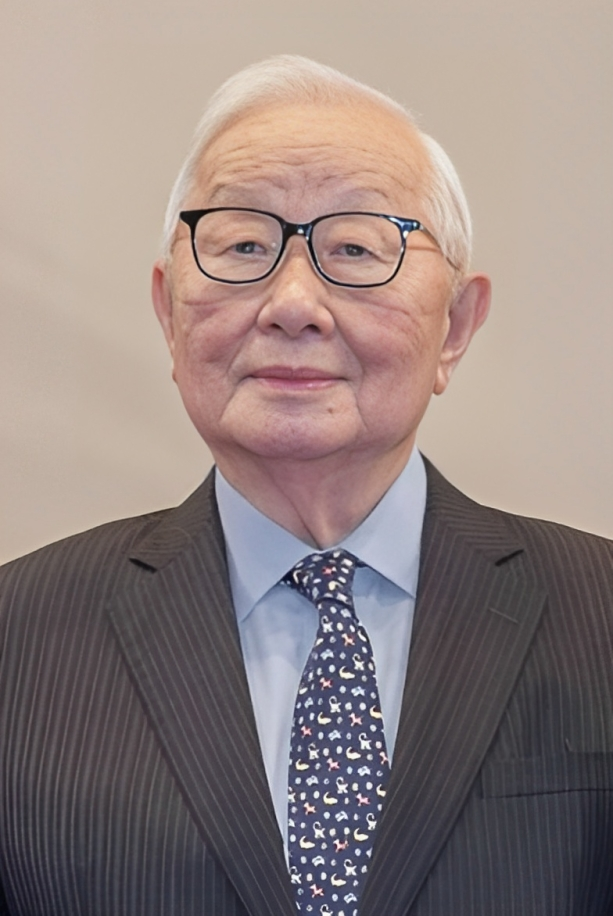
Taiwan
Morris Chang,
Special Representative of Leader (Note: Due to the complexities of the relations between it and the People's Republic of China, the Republic of China (ROC or "Taiwan") was not represented under its official name "Republic of China" or as "Taiwan". Instead, it participates in APEC under the name "Chinese Taipei". The president of the Republic of China does not attend the annual APEC Economic Leaders' Meeting in person. Instead, it was generally represented by a ministerial-level official responsible for economic affairs or someone designated by the president. See List of Chinese Taipei representatives to APEC.)
(representing President Tsai Ing-wen)

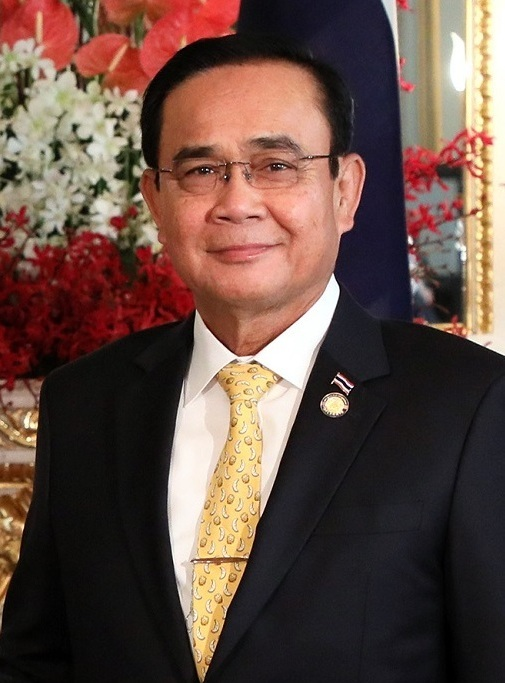
Thailand
Prayut Chan-o-cha,
Prime Minister

United States
Joe Biden,
President

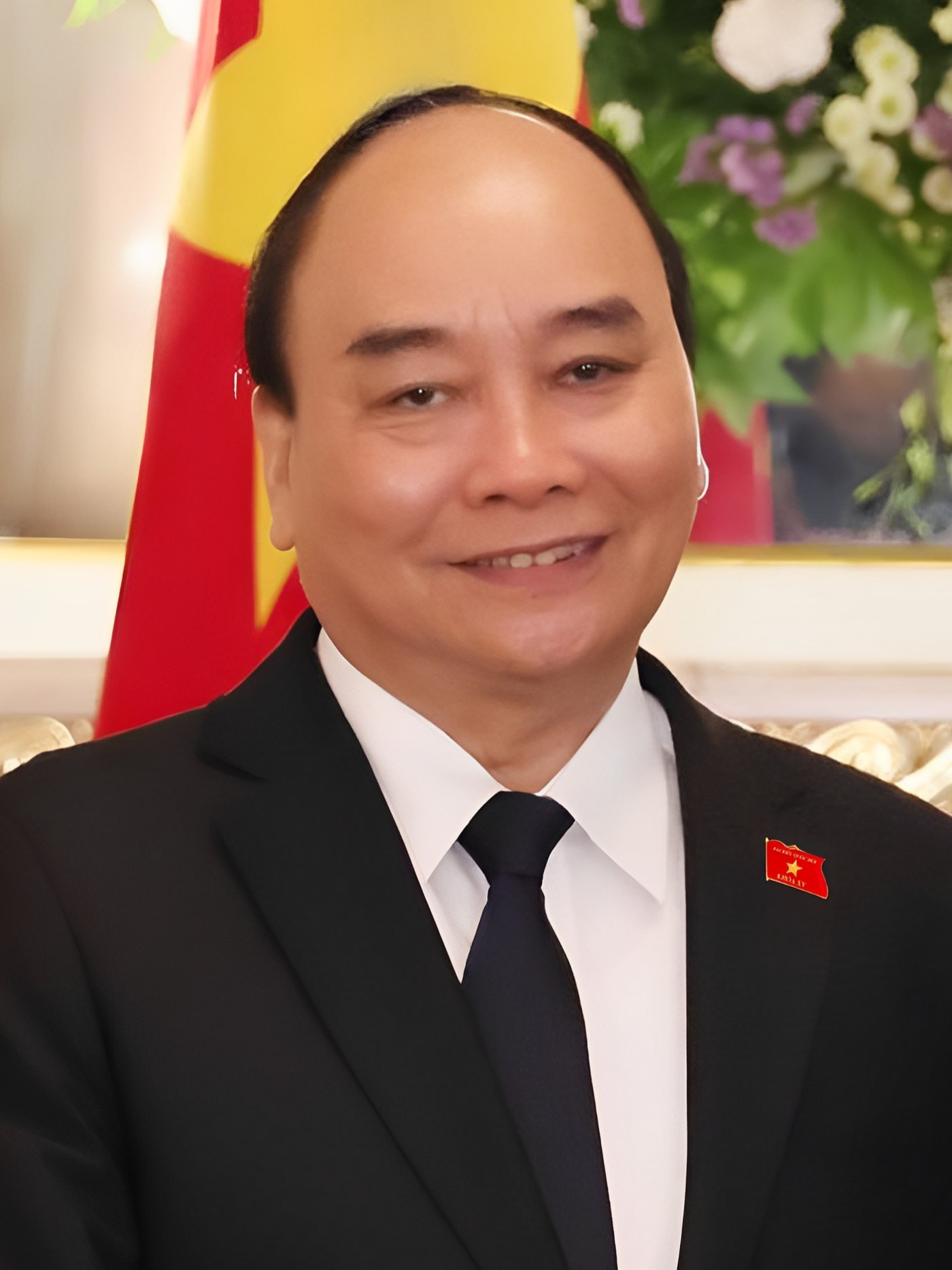
Vietnam
Nguyễn Xuân Phúc,
President (Note: The actual head of government of Vietnam is the Prime Minister. The President of Vietnam is legally the head of state, but the General Secretary of the Communist Party of Vietnam is the practical highest political leader in one-party communist state.)

== Notes ==
Preceded by APEC Malaysia 2020	APEC meetings 2021	Succeeded by APEC Thailand 2022
