= APEC United States 2011 =

Economic meeting in Honolulu

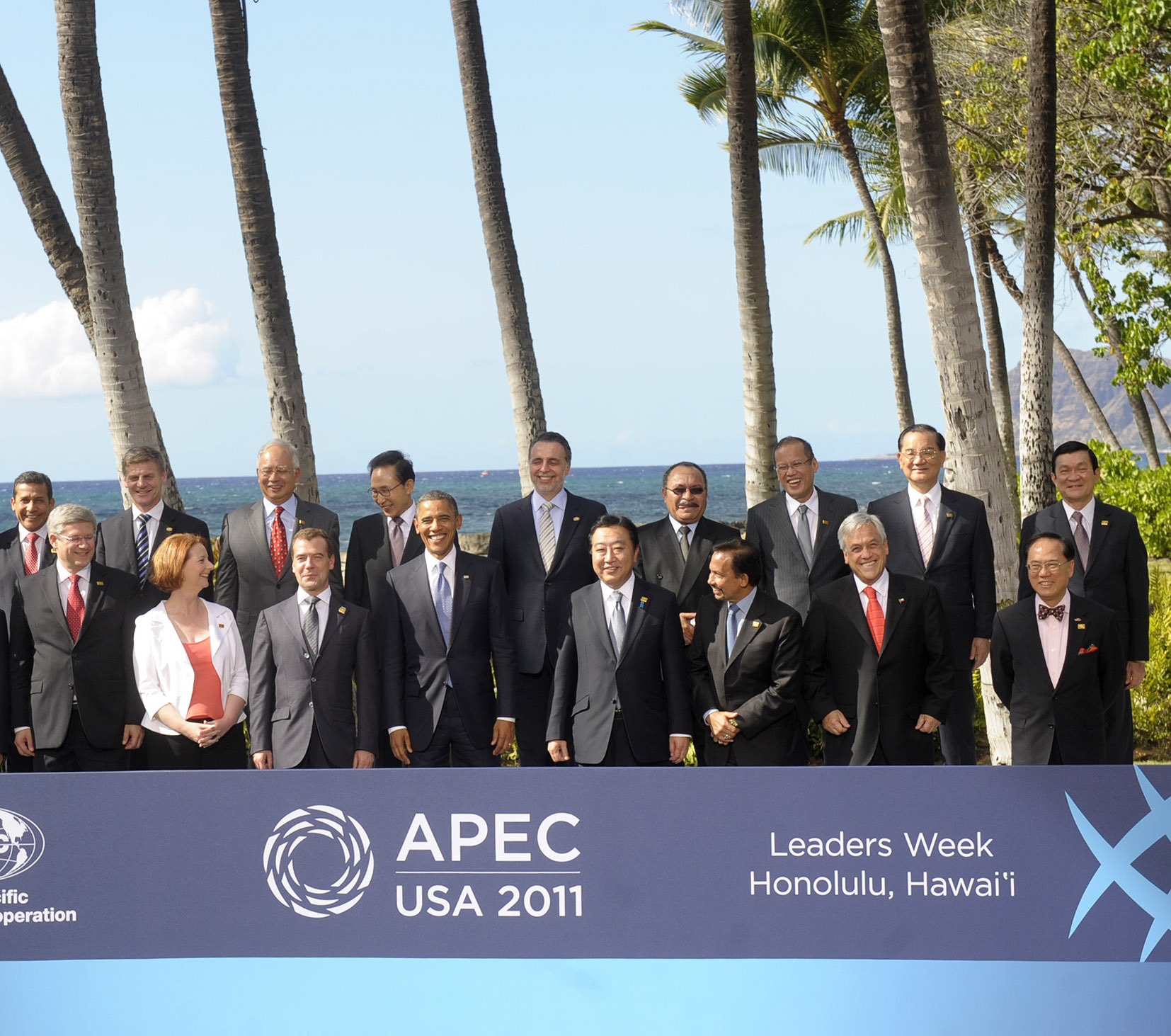
- APEC United States 2011 Delegates
- Host country: United States
- Date: 12–13 November
- Venues: Hawaii Convention Center, Honolulu
- Follows: APEC Japan 2010
- Precedes: APEC Russia 2012
- Website: apec2011.gov (archived)

APEC United States 2011 was a series of political meetings around the United States between the 21 member economies of the Asia-Pacific Economic Cooperation during 2011. It culminated in the 19th APEC Economic Leaders' Meeting held at the Hawaii Convention Center in Honolulu, Hawaii from November 12–13, 2011. The United States last hosted an APEC summit at the 1993 summit in Seattle. President Barack Obama, a Honolulu native, and First Lady Michelle Obama hosted the other leaders and spouses.

== Attendees ==
Former Vice President of the Republic of China Lien Chan represented the Republic of China (Taiwan) at the APEC summit. He served as President Ma Ying-jeou's envoy for the fourth consecutive year.

Thai Prime Minister Yingluck Shinawatra withdrew from the summit due to ongoing flood disaster in Bangkok. Shinawatra was instead represented by her Deputy Prime Minister Kittiratt Na-Ranong. Mexican President Felipe Calderón cancelled his trip to the APEC summit following the death of Mexican Secretary of the Interior Francisco Blake Mora, who died in a helicopter crash. New Zealand Prime Minister John Key did not attends to the summit due to upcoming general election. Key was represented by his Deputy Prime Minister Bill English. Japanese Prime Minister Yoshihiko Noda attends to the summit, following the resignation of Naoto Kan in last August due to poor approval ratings and rebuilding efforts in Tokyo after the felted by 2011 Tōhoku earthquake and tsunami and Fukushima nuclear disaster.

Attendees at the 2011 APEC Economic Leaders' Meeting
Country	Position	Name
Australia	Prime Minister	Julia Gillard
Brunei	Sultan	Hassanal Bolkiah
Canada	Prime Minister	Stephen Harper
Chile	President	Sebastián Piñera
China	President	Hu Jintao
Hong Kong	Chief Executive	Donald Tsang
Indonesia	President	Susilo Bambang Yudhoyono
Japan	Prime Minister	Yoshihiko Noda
South Korea	President	Lee Myung-bak
Malaysia	Prime Minister	Najib Razak
Mexico	~~President~~	~~Felipe Calderón~~
New Zealand*	Deputy Prime Minister	Bill English
Papua New Guinea	Prime Minister	Peter O'Neill
Peru	President	Ollanta Humala
Philippines	President	Benigno Aquino III
Russia	President	Dmitry Medvedev
Singapore	Prime Minister	Lee Hsien Loong
Chinese Taipei	Special Representative	Lien Chan
Thailand*	Deputy Prime Minister	Kittirat Na-Ranong
United States	President	Barack Obama
Vietnam	President	Trương Tấn Sang
(*) New Zealand Prime Minister John Key and Thai Prime Minister Yingluck Shinawatra did not attend the leaders summit. Representatives of both countries were sent and attended on their behalf.

== Issues ==
=== Trans-Pacific Strategic Economic Partnership ===
Leaders of nine APEC nations were expected to negotiate on the Trans-Pacific Strategic Economic Partnership, a multilateral free trade agreement.

=== Balanced, Sustainable, and Inclusive Growth ===
APEC leaders endorsed the Pittsburgh G20 principles and agreed to implement the policies of the G20 Framework for Strong, Sustainable, and Balanced Growth, further expanding the global commitment to achieve more balanced growth that is less prone to destabilizing booms and busts. Leaders pledged to make growth more inclusive through APEC initiatives that will support development of small and medium enterprises, facilitate worker retraining, and enhance economic opportunity for women.

=== Regional Economic Integration ===
The U.S.-led initiatives will engage with current and potential future members of the Trans-Pacific Partnership Free Trade Agreement to shape a broad-based, comprehensive, and high-standard platform to successfully integrate the economies of the Asia-Pacific. APEC leaders announced their commitment to accelerate economic integration and, to that end, endorsed a U.S.-Australia initiative in APEC to promote cross-border services trade in the region.

=== Facilitating Trade ===
APEC leaders took steps to facilitate increased trade in the region by simplifying complicated customs procedures and documentation resulting from the region's numerous trade agreements, improving the region's enforcement of intellectual property rights, and speeding the movement of goods across and within borders. They also announced an action plan designed to make it 25 percent cheaper, easier, and faster to conduct business in the region by 2015 by decreasing costs and streamlining processes associated with starting and operating a business in APEC economies.

=== Supporting the Multilateral Trading System ===
APEC leaders instructed their trade ministers to work towards a successful conclusion of the Doha Development Agenda in 2010 and reaffirmed their commitment to refrain from raising new barriers to investment or to trade in goods and services.

=== Climate Change ===
U.S. President Obama urged all APEC member economies to work together to address the shared challenge of climate change. He and APEC leaders called for collective action by all economies and committed to reaching an ambitious outcome in Copenhagen in December.

=== Low Carbon and Green Growth ===
APEC Leaders endorsed the G20 commitment to rationalize and phase out over the medium-term inefficient fossil fuel subsidies that encourage wasteful consumption. Leaders commended APEC efforts to review its members' energy efficiency policies and to foster regional trade in environmental goods and services, which would spur the growth of "green collar" jobs.

=== Food Security, Food Safety, and Secure Trade ===
Leaders instructed their officials to implement programs aimed at improving agricultural productivity and enhancing agricultural markets in the APEC region. Leaders also commended U.S.-led APEC initiatives that bring together public and private sector experts to promote international best practices that will improve regional food and product safety and combat trade in counterfeit medical products. They called for a continuation of APEC's work in areas such as trade and aviation security, counter-terrorism financing, and emergency and disaster preparedness.

== Outcomes ==
=== The Honolulu Declaration ===
At APEC 2011 Economic Leaders' Meeting, held on 11 November in Honolulu, Leaders issued the Leaders' Declaration (Honolulu Declaration) and the APEC Leaders' "Statements on Promoting Effective, Non-Discriminatory, and Market-Drive Innovation Policy; Enhancing Small and Medium Sized Enterprises Participation in Global Production Chains; Trade and Investment in Environmental Goods and Services; and Strengthening Implementation of Good Regulatory Practices".

== Media coverage ==
Over 1,250 reporters and journalists arrived in Hawaii to cover the 2011 APEC Summit.

== See also ==
- Asia-Pacific Economic Cooperation

Preceded by APEC Japan 2010	APEC meetings 2011	Succeeded by APEC Russia 2012
