= APEC Thailand 2022 =

APEC 2022 Thailand การประชุมเอเปค พ.ศ. 2565 ประเทศไทย

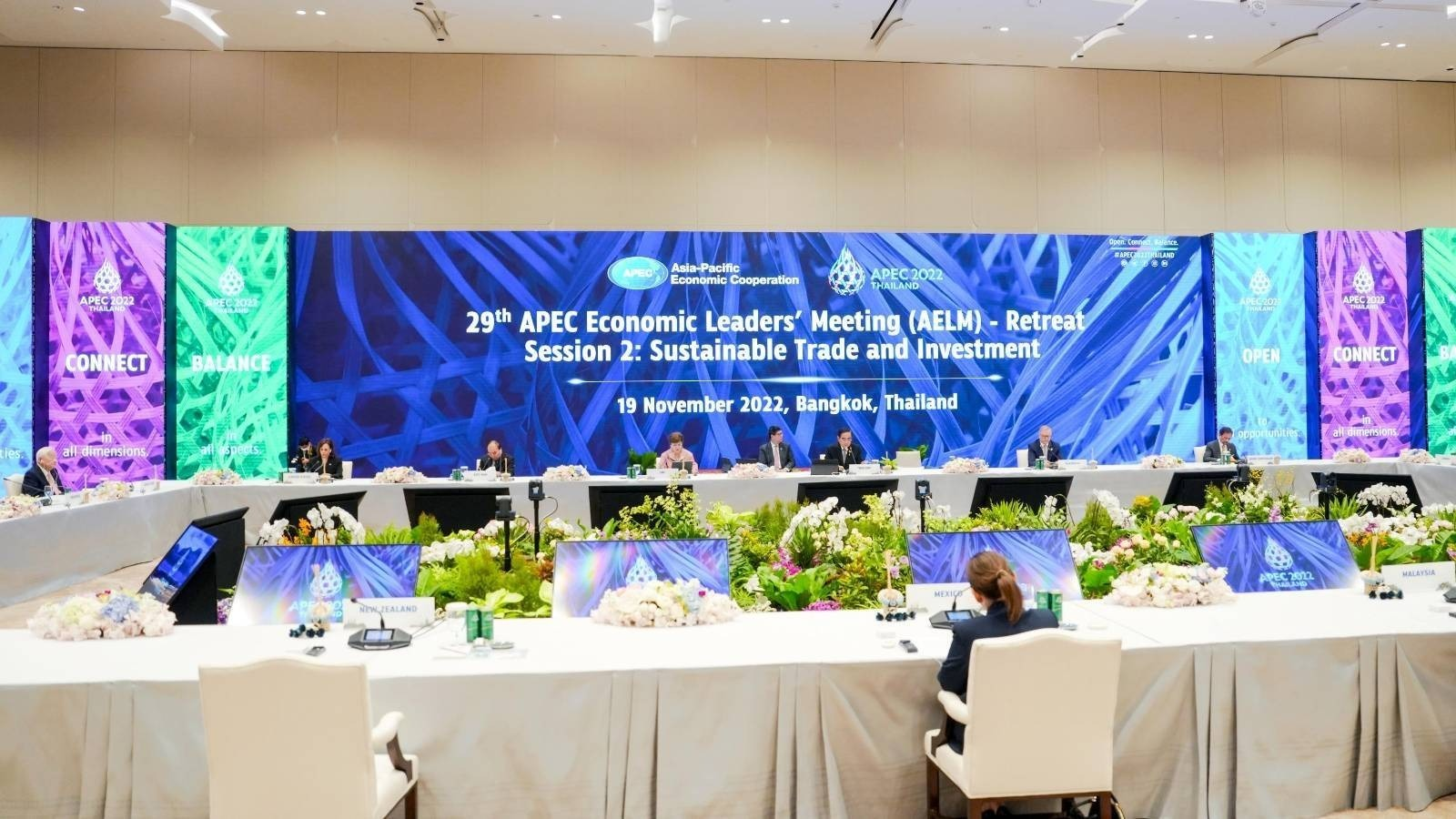
- Host country: Thailand
- Date: 16–19 November 2022
- Motto: Open. Connect. Balance. (Thai: เปิดกว้าง สร้างสัมพันธ์ เชื่อมโยงกัน สู่สมดุล)
- Venues: Main venue Queen Sirikit National Convention Center, Bangkok Other meetings 3 host locations: Bangkok; Chiang Mai; Khon Kaen; Phuket
- Follows: APEC New Zealand 2021
- Precedes: APEC United States 2023
- Website: apec2022.go.th (archived)

APEC 2022 Thailand was the year-long hosting of Asia-Pacific Economic Cooperation (APEC) meetings in Thailand that took place in 2022. Thailand previously hosted APEC meetings in 2003 and 1992.

The theme for the 2022 APEC meetings is "Open. Connect. Balance."

The summit returned into an in-person meeting since the 2018 summit after the 2019 summit in Chile was cancelled due to protests in the country and the last two editions were held virtually due to the COVID-19 pandemic.

Following the assassination of Shinzo Abe, former Prime Minister of Japan, on 8 July 2022, security concerns were raised for the event that was only four months away, which led to heightened security measures being taken by Thailand.

== Logo ==
The APEC 2022 logo was selected from the 2021 National Youth Design Award competition, jointly organized by the Thai Foreign ministry and several Thai universities. Logo submissions were accepted from 1 May to 30 June 2021. 598 logos were submitted by people under 25 year old from many countries.

The logo selected from the contest was made by Chawanon Wongtrakuljong, an architecture student from Chulalongkorn University in Bangkok. It features a Chalom, an ancient traditional bamboo basket used to carry products and goods in Thailand. Chaloms are made with bamboo strips, tied and interlaced together to serve as a strong structure. Thus, it is used to symbolize strength, resilience, and cooperation between the nations in the region. Chalom also represents prosperous trading and commerce, since it is used to carry goods. Additionally, the logo also represents sustainability, because Chaloms are made from bamboo, an environmentally friendly material.

The 21 openings between the woven bamboo stands for the 21 APEC nations. The 3 colors used in the logo represents the motto of the meeting:

Blue represents "Open"
Pink represents "Connect"
Green represents "Balance"

== Events ==
=== Participants ===
This was the first APEC Meeting for Australian Prime Minister Anthony Albanese, Chilean President Gabriel Boric, Philippine President Bongbong Marcos, and Hong Kong Chief Executive John Lee after their inaugurations on 23 May 2022, 11 March 2022, 30 June 2022, and 1 July 2022, respectively. It was also the last APEC meeting for Vietnamese President Nguyễn Xuân Phúc, New Zealand Prime Minister Jacinda Ardern and the host Thai Prime Minister Prayut Chan-o-cha who stepped down on 18 January 2023 (following the Pres. Phúc's resignation), 24 January 2023 (following the Prime Minister Ardern's resignation and appointment of Chris Hipkins as Prime Minister) and 22 August 2023 (following the 2023 Thai general election and election of Srettha Thavisin as Prime Minister), respectively.

Among those who chose not to attend were United States President Joe Biden, South Korean President Yoon Suk-yeol and Peruvian President Pedro Castillo, which would have been their first in-person APEC meetings. Biden, who attended the wedding of his granddaughter instead, was represented by Vice President Kamala Harris in his place, Yoon himself was represented by South Korean Prime Minister Han Duck-soo in his place, while Castillo was also represented by Vice President Dina Boluarte in his place. Mexican President Andrés Manuel López Obrador, who rarely undertakes foreign trips, also chose not to travel to Thailand and attend the meeting. López Obrador was represented by his Mexican ambassador to Thailand Bernardo Tello. Malaysian Prime Minister Ismail Sabri Yaakob also skipped the meeting as its schedule conflicts with the 2022 Malaysian general election, where he sought re-election as leader of the United Malays National Organisation. Russian president Vladimir Putin also did not attend the summit due to the country's invasion of neighboring Ukraine; he was represented by Deputy Prime Minister Andrey Belousov.

Additionally, recently inaugurated leaders Papua New Guinean Prime Minister James Marape and Japanese Prime Minister Fumio Kishida, who had to go entirely remote for the 2020 and 2021 summits, had their first in-person APEC meeting.

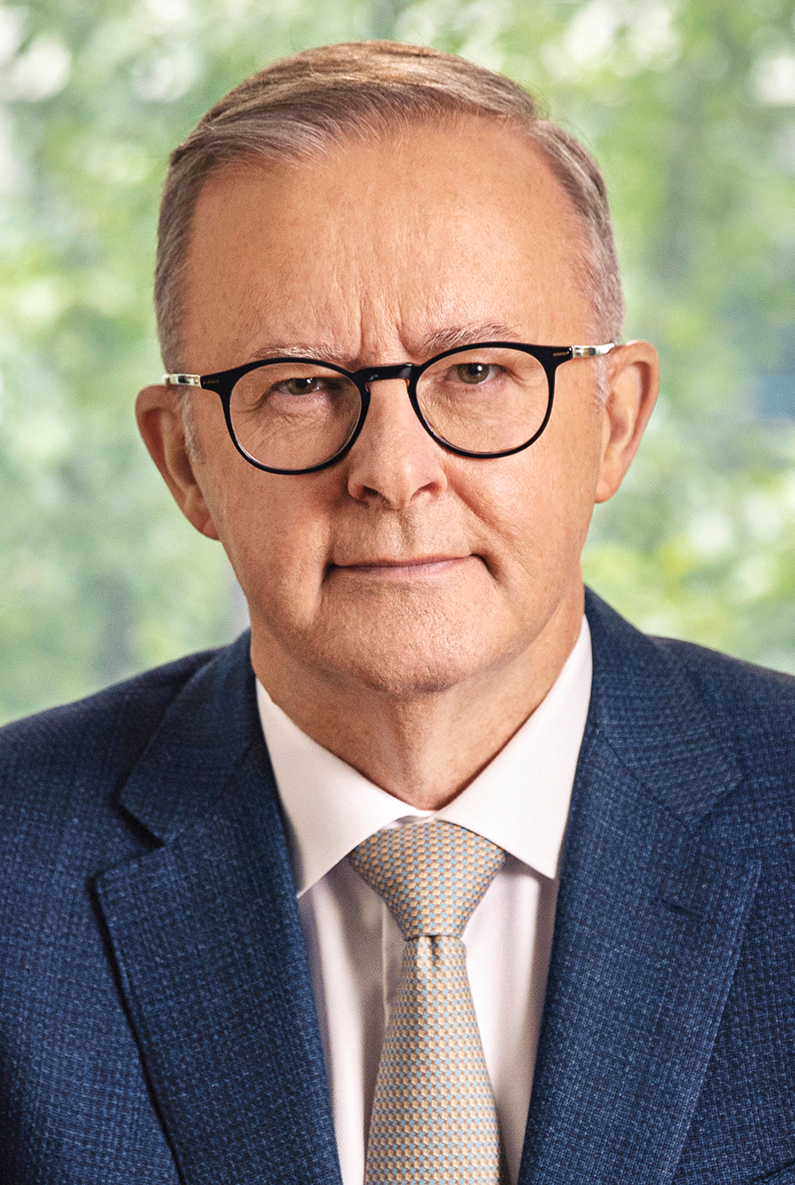
Australia
Anthony Albanese,
Prime Minister

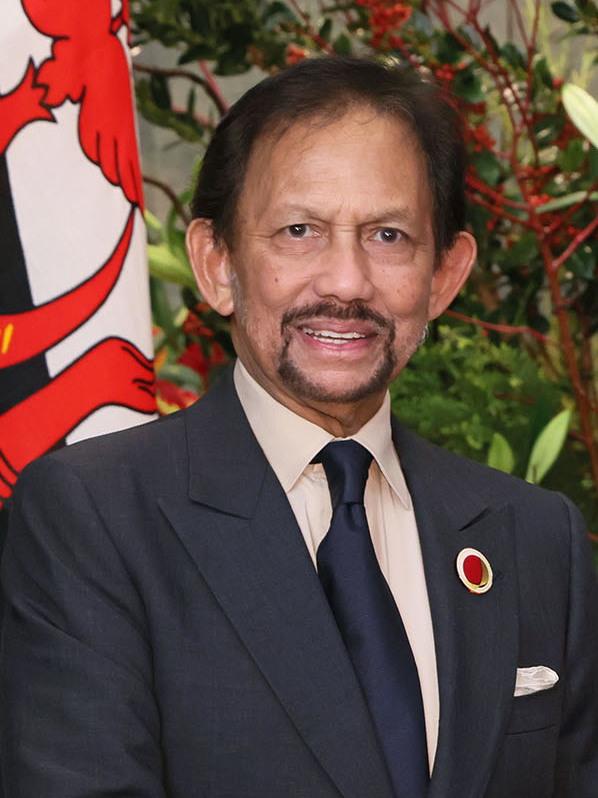
Brunei
Hassanal Bolkiah,
Sultan

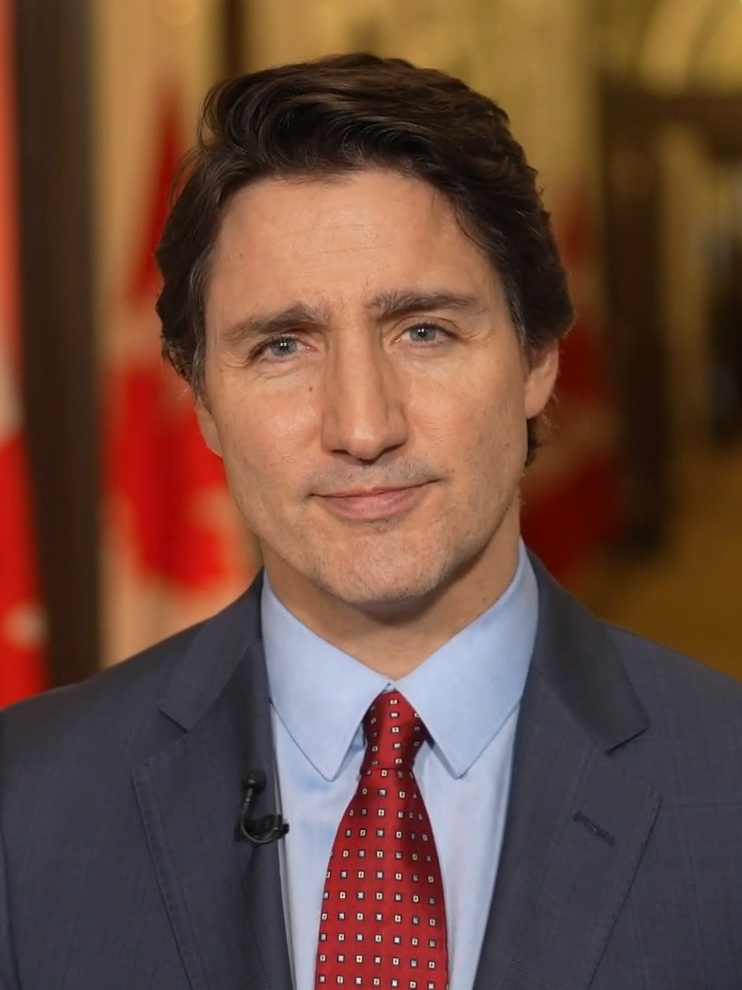
Canada
Justin Trudeau,
Prime Minister

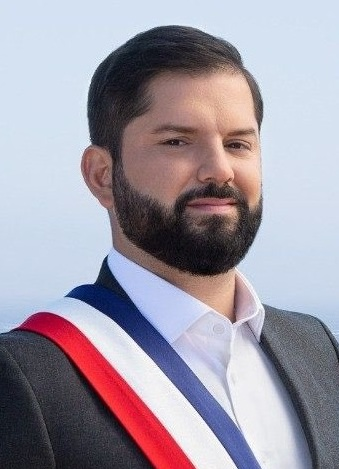
Chile
Gabriel Boric,
President

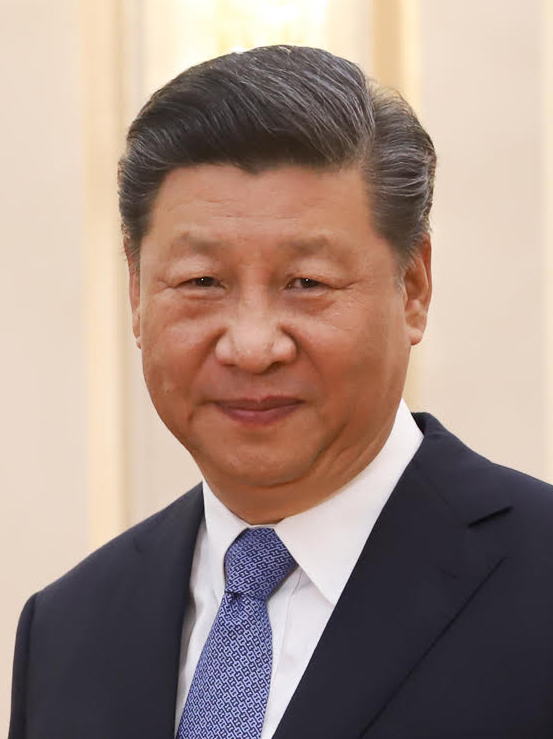
China
Xi Jinping,
President (Note: The President of China is legally a ceremonial office, but the General Secretary of the Chinese Communist Party (de facto leader in one-party communist state) has always held this office since 1993 except for the months of transition, and the current general secretary is Xi Jinping, who is also the Chinese President.)

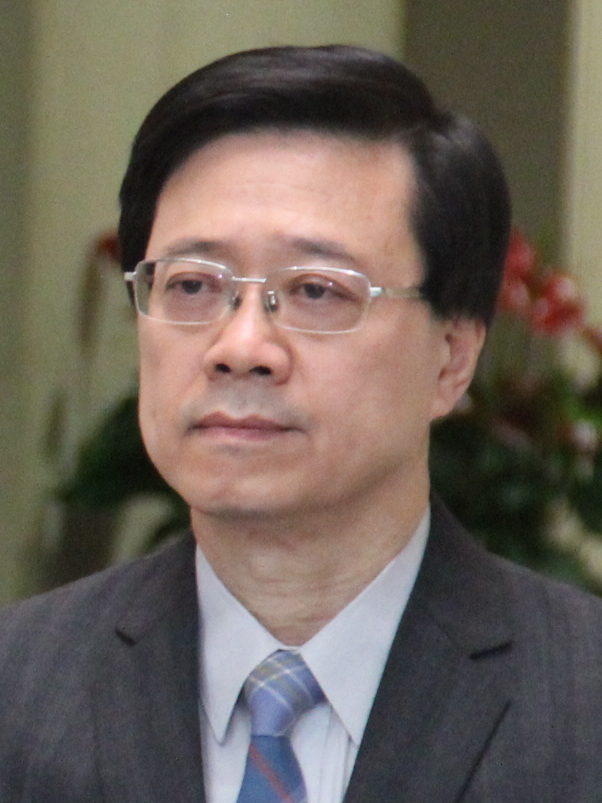
Hong Kong
John Lee,
Chief Executive

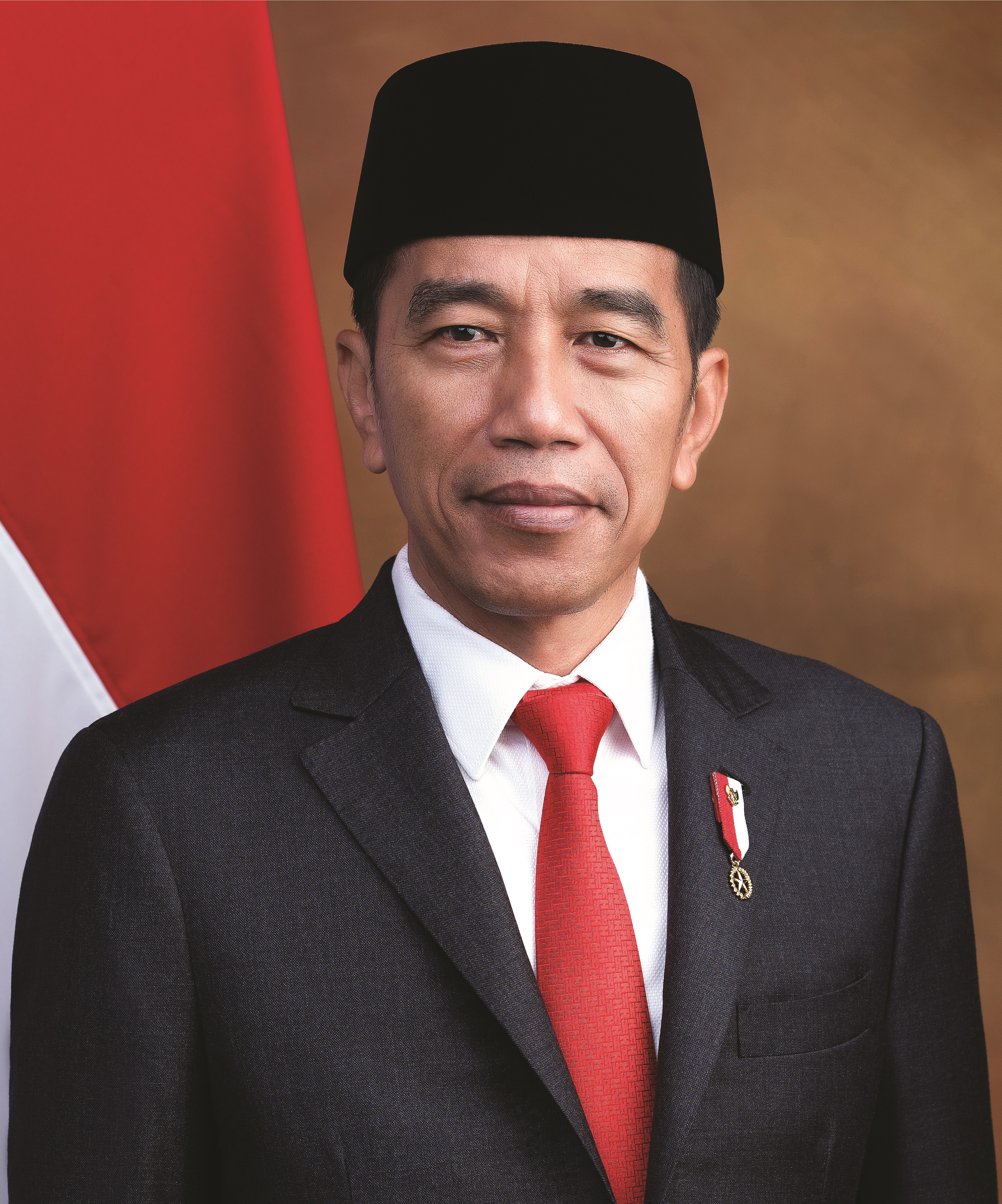
Indonesia
Joko Widodo,
President

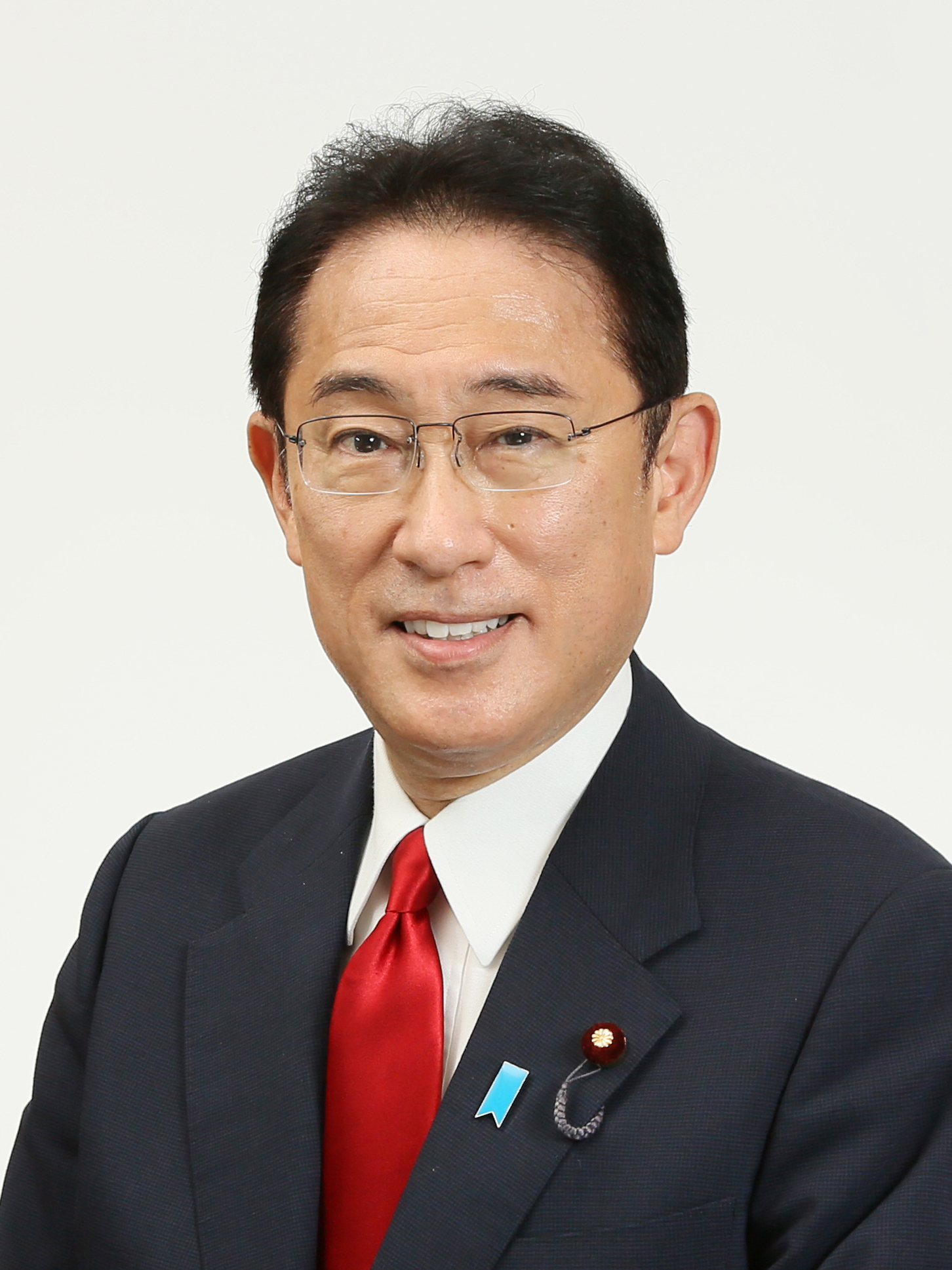
Japan
Fumio Kishida,
Prime Minister

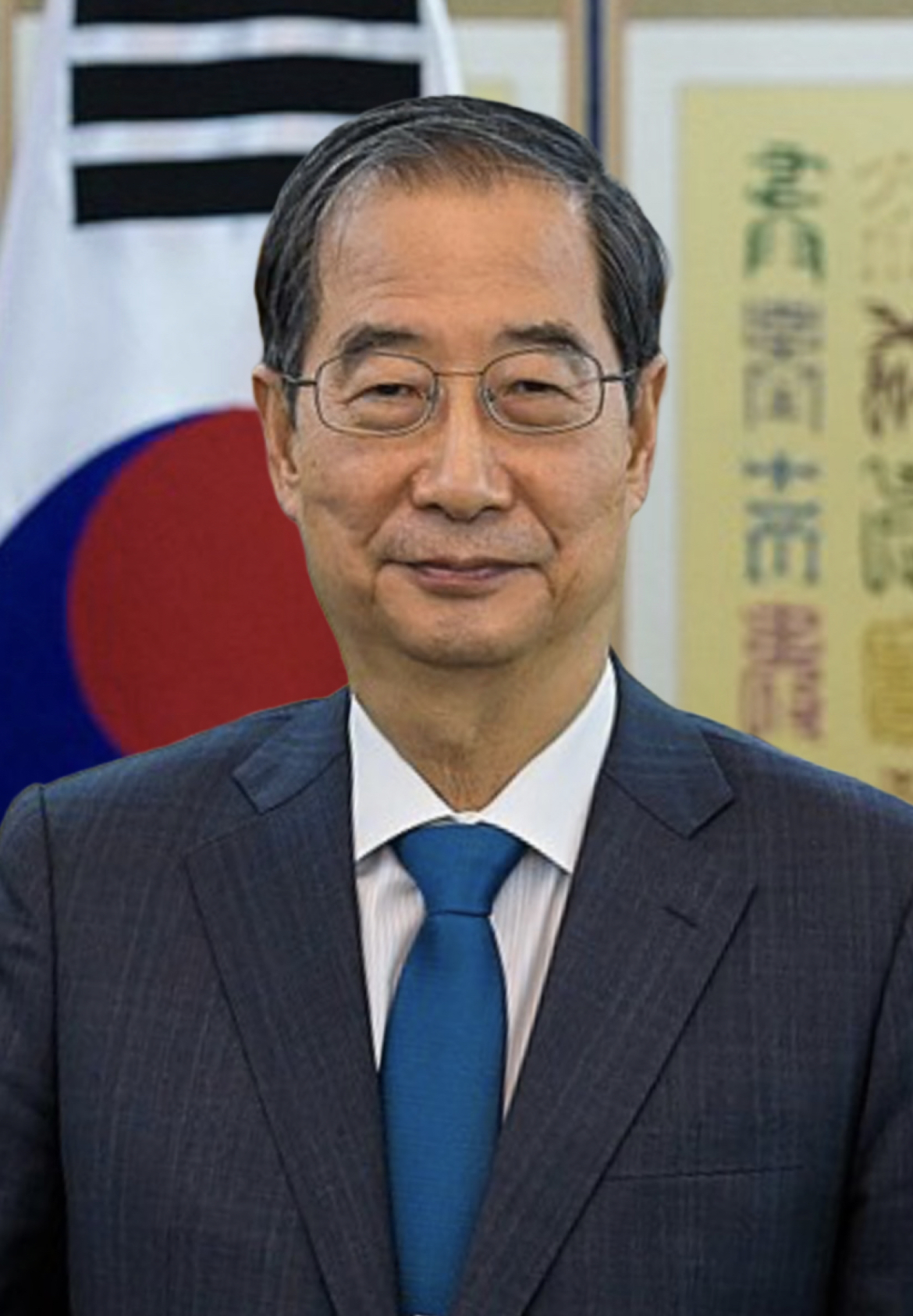
South Korea* (Note: (*) Mexican President Andrés Manuel López Obrador, United States President Joe Biden, Malaysian Prime Minister Ismail Sabri Yaakob, Peruvian President Pedro Castillo, Russian President Vladimir Putin, and South Korean President Yoon Suk-yeol did not attend the leaders' summit. Representatives of each country were sent to attend on their behalf.)
Han Duck-soo,
Prime Minister

Malaysia*
Mohd Zuki Ali,
Chief Secretary

Mexico*
Bernardo Tello,
Mexican Ambassador to Thailand

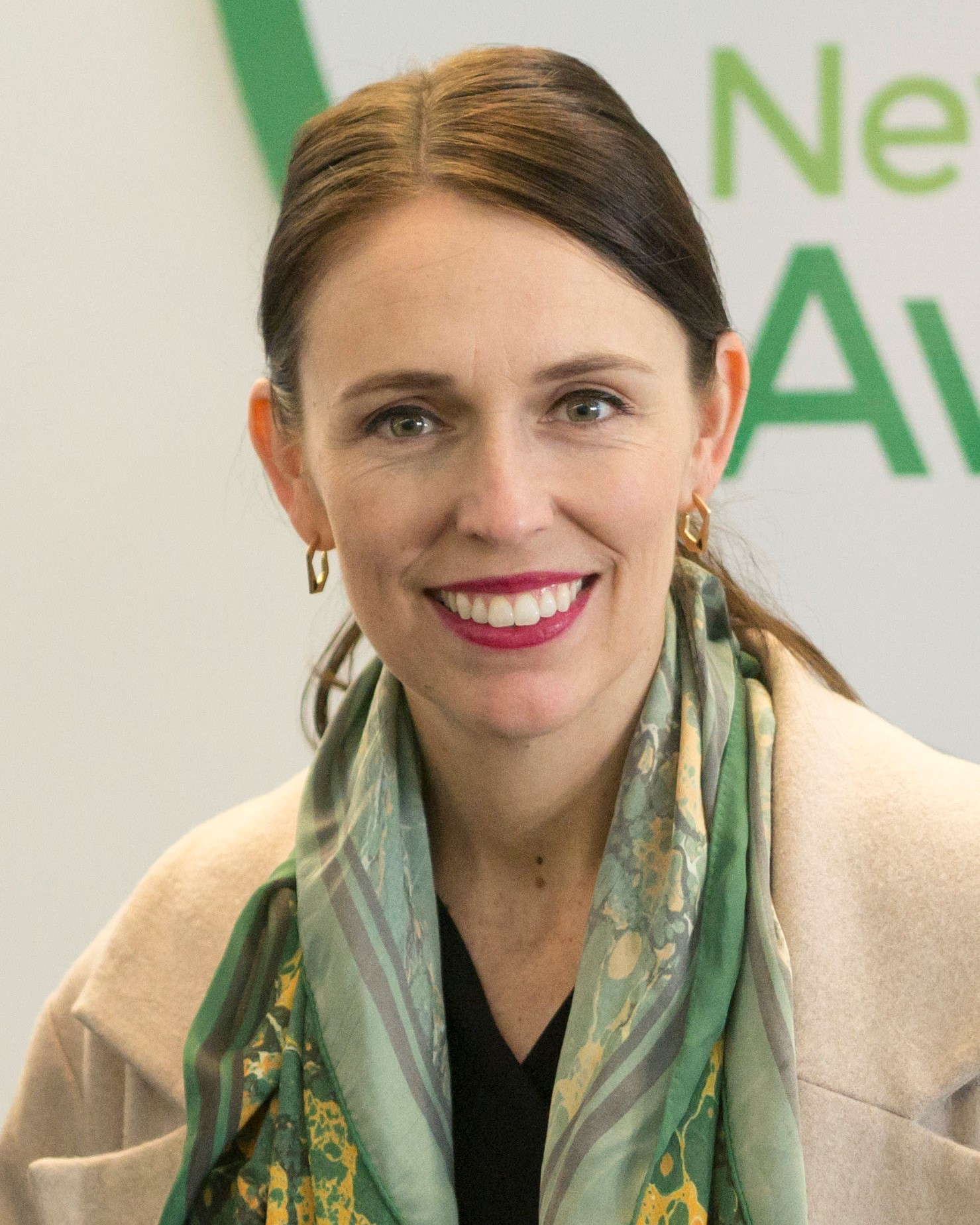
New Zealand
Jacinda Ardern,
Prime Minister

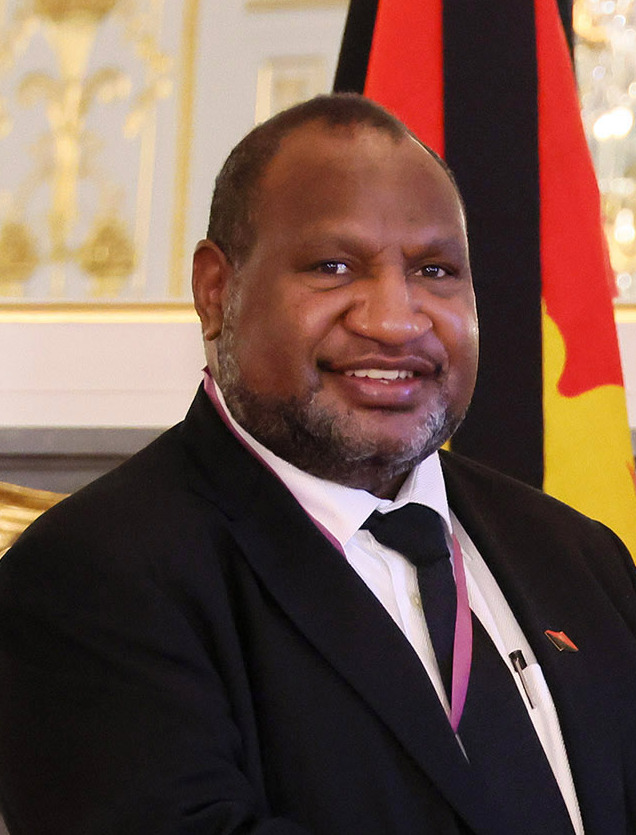
Papua New Guinea
James Marape,
Prime Minister

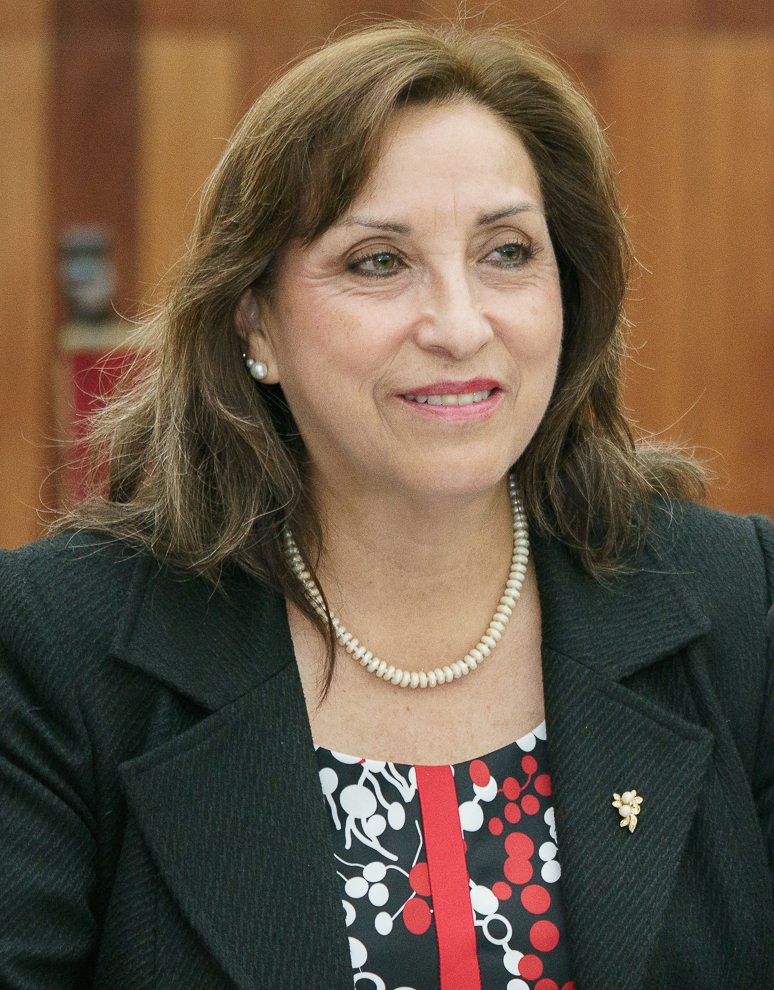
Peru*
Dina Boluarte,
First Vice President of Peru

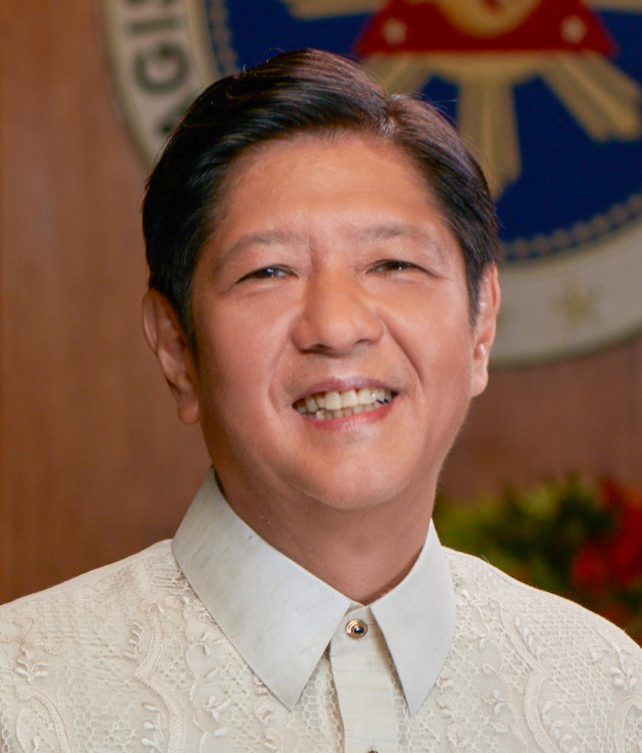
Philippines
Bongbong Marcos,
President

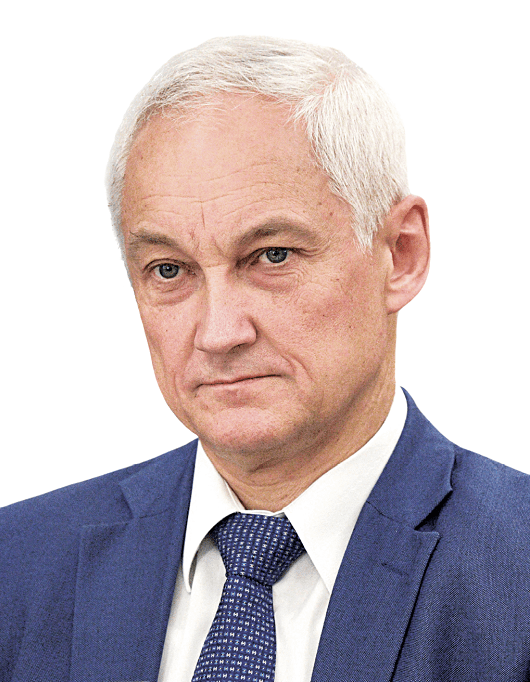
Russia*
Andrey Belousov,
Deputy Prime Minister (Note: Russian President Vladimir Putin and Russian Prime Minister Mikhail Mishustin chose not to attend the leaders summit. Deputy Prime Minister Andrey Belousov attended on his behalf.)

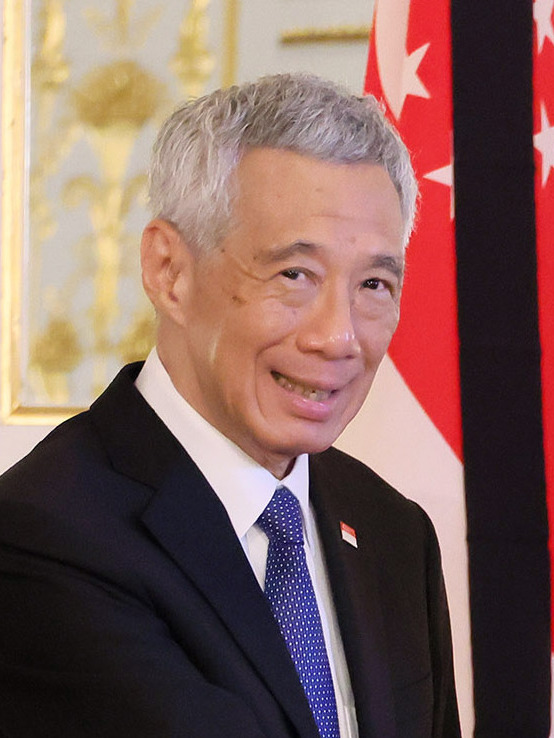
Singapore
Lee Hsien Loong,
Prime Minister

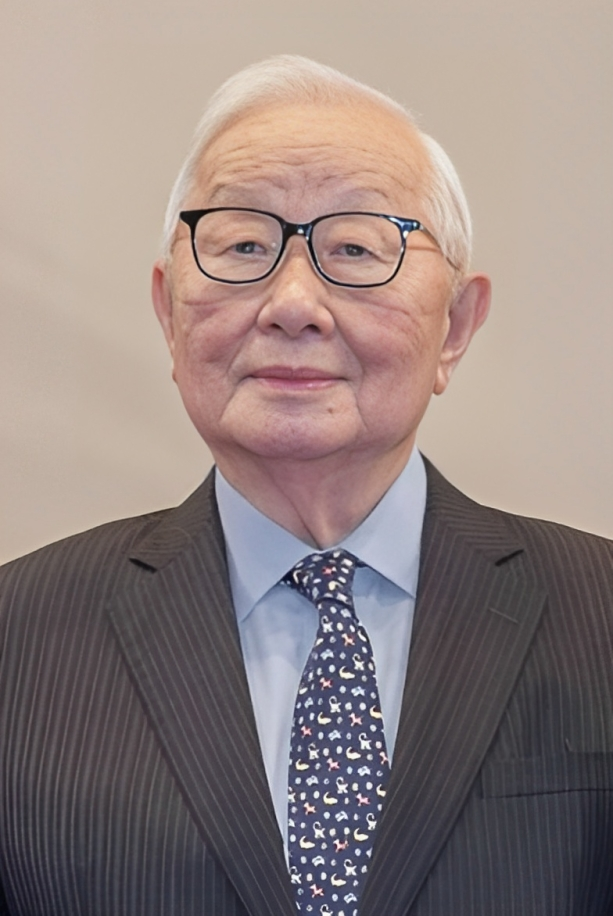
Taiwan
Morris Chang,
Special Representative of Leader (Note: Due to the complexities of the relations between it and the People's Republic of China, the Republic of China (ROC or "Taiwan") was not represented under its official name "Republic of China" or as "Taiwan". Instead, it participates in APEC under the name "Chinese Taipei". The president of the Republic of China does not attend the annual APEC Economic Leaders' Meeting in person. Instead, it was generally represented by a ministerial-level official responsible for economic affairs or someone designated by the president. See List of Chinese Taipei representatives to APEC.)
(representing President Tsai Ing-wen)

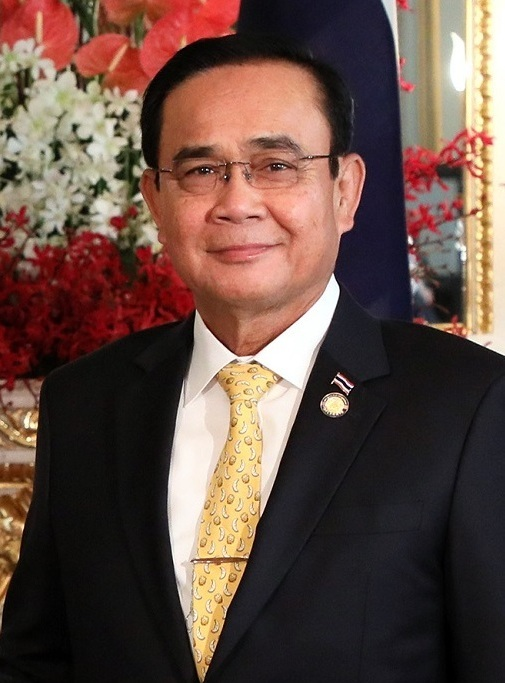
Thailand
Prayut Chan-o-cha,
Prime Minister (Host)

United States*
Kamala Harris,
Vice President (Note: U.S. President Joe Biden chose not to attend the leaders summit. Vice President Kamala Harris attended on his behalf.)

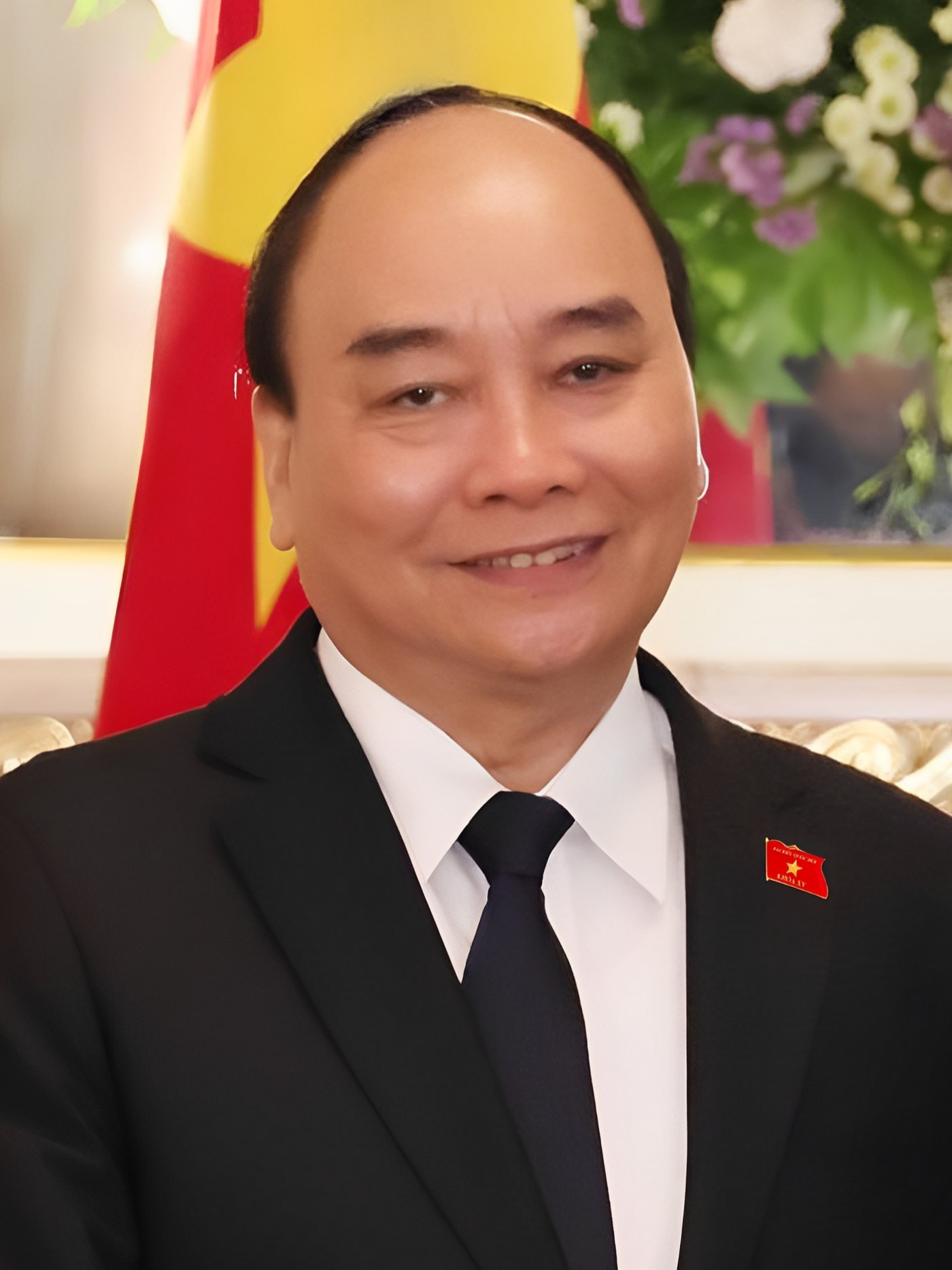
Vietnam
Nguyễn Xuân Phúc,
President (Note: The actual head of government of Vietnam is the Prime Minister. The President of Vietnam is legally the head of state, but the General Secretary of the Communist Party of Vietnam is the practical highest political leader in one-party communist state.)

=== Invited guests ===
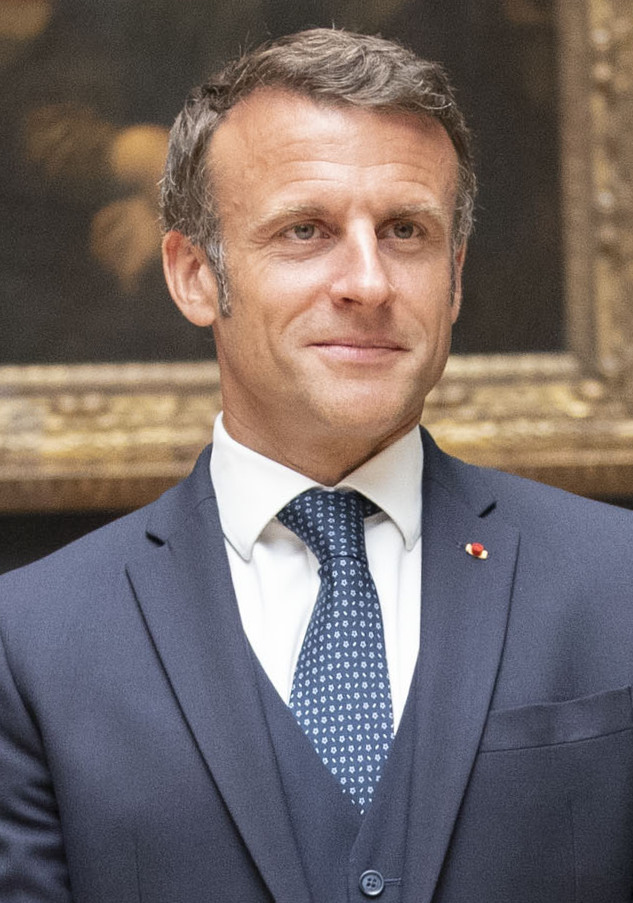
France
Emmanuel Macron (Note: The leaders of France and Saudi Arabia attended the meeting as the invited guests of host Prayut Chan-o-cha.), President

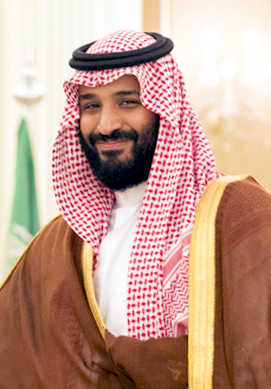
Saudi Arabia
Mohammed bin Salman, Crown Prince and Prime Minister

Cambodian Prime Minister Hun Sen, who was also the 2022 Chairperson of ASEAN, cancelled his guest attendance and returned to Cambodia before the start of the summit because he tested positive for COVID-19.

== Protests ==
Multiple protests took place during APEC. Activists and civil society groups stated that the government of Thailand wanted to improve its legitimacy and to greenwash the image of the major polluters in the country. Activists say that they were monitored and intimidated in the weeks leading up to the summit.

On 18 November clashes broke out between several hundred protesters and riot police, which resulted in multiple protesters and journalists being injured and one protester losing sight in one eye.

== See also ==
APEC summits hosted by Thailand

- APEC Thailand 1992
- APEC Thailand 2003

Preceded by APEC New Zealand 2021	APEC meetings 2022	Succeeded by APEC United States 2023
