= APEC Singapore 2009 =

Asia-Pacific Economic Cooperation meeting

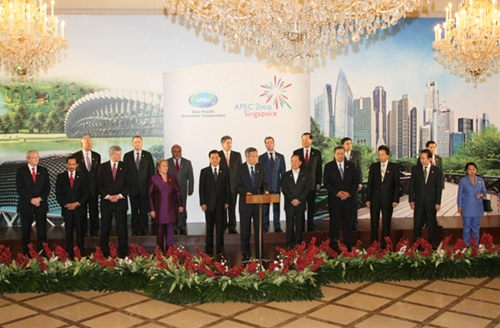
- APEC Singapore 2009 Delegates
- Host country: Singapore
- Date: 14–15 November
- Motto: Sustaining Growth, Connecting the Region
- Follows: APEC Peru 2008
- Precedes: APEC Japan 2010
- Website: apec2009.sg (archived)

APEC Singapore 2009 was a series of political meetings held around Singapore between the 21 member economies of the Asia-Pacific Economic Cooperation during 2009. It culminated in the 17th APEC Economic Leaders' Meeting (AELM) held in Singapore from 14 to 15 November 2009.

== Theme ==
The theme for 2009 is 'Sustaining Growth, Connecting the Region'. APEC Singapore 2009 will build on APEC's work to date in promoting economic growth, cooperation, trade and investment across the Asia-Pacific region. In addition, given today's challenging global economic environment, APEC Singapore 2009 is also focused on overcoming the economic crisis and positioning member economies for a sustainable recovery in the post-crisis world. The main areas for discussion during the year are: Positioning for Economic Recovery; Supporting Multilateral Trading Systems; and Accelerating Regional Economic Integration.

== Logo ==
The APEC Singapore 2009 logo depicts a spark image made up of 21 strokes which represents the 21 APEC member economies coming together to convene at a single point and working towards unity, cooperation and synergy to advance common interests. It also signifies the dynamism within the APEC community and a catalyst that inspires new ideas and initiatives to further the vision of APEC.

== Entertainment ==
The APEC Singapore 2009 is also used as a platform for Singapore's local talent to show off their creativity to world leaders during the performance, “Singapore Evening at The Esplanade”, in the evening on November 14, 2009 outside the Esplanade, Singapore. Themed “Our World, One World”, Singapore Evening at The Esplanade features a concert enhanced with multimedia projections, directed by Dick Lee, a Cultural Medallion Award winner.

It featured a unique dining concept set against Singapore's iconic architecture and waterfront landscape, a wide variety of food are presented representing the different cultures of Singapore as it included the unique dishes from the three main races of Singapore: Chinese, Malay and Indian. The concert featured a total of 376 local artistes in a 30-minute musical extravaganza as well as in the interactive cultural pavilions and performances along the Waterfront.

The highlights of the night are the performance of the theme song by popular local artiste Kit Chan, written by Dick Lee, and a cover of popular songs such as Heal the World by the first Singapore Idol winner, Taufik Batisah.

== See also ==
- Asia-Pacific Economic Cooperation

| Preceded by APEC Peru 2008 | APEC meetings 2009 | Succeeded by APEC Japan 2010 |
