= APEC Peru 2008 =

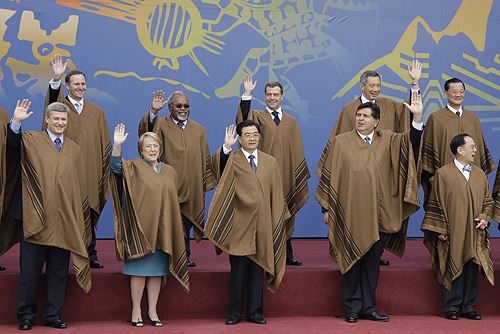
- APEC Peru 2008 delegates
- Host country: Peru
- Date: 22–23 November
- Motto: A new commitment to Asia-Pacific Development.
- Venues: Lima
- Follows: APEC Australia 2007
- Precedes: APEC Singapore 2009
- Website: apec2008.org.pe (archived)

APEC Peru 2008 was a series of political meetings held around Peru between the 21 member economies of the Asia-Pacific Economic Cooperation during 2008. Although business leaders of the region also met before the summit officially began. Leaders from all the member countries met during November 22–23, 2008, in the capital city of Lima.

The 21 members accounted for approximately 60 percent of the world's gross domestic product.

== Peruvian history in APEC ==
Peru has been a full member of APEC since 1998. Its participation began when Malaysia hosted the forum's summit in Kuala Lumpur.

The admission of Peru into APEC was a result of the coordinated efforts of representatives of the government and the business and academic communities. Peru developed a strategy that, together with visits of high-level public officials to the various Asia-Pacific economies, gained the support of the members in order to achieve this end.

== Expansion ==
Since 2004, Colombia and Ecuador had been expecting to join APEC when Peru hosts the meeting; but in APEC Australia 2007, the leaders agreed not to allow any more members until 2010.

== Logo ==
The logo for the APEC Peru 2008 summit was created by the advertising designer Nilton García Tejada, who, in 2004, won a contest convened by the Peruvian Ministry of Foreign Affairs. The logo blended a strong sense of modernity and history. The red and white colours represented the colours of the national flag of Peru, while the mysterious shapes represented Machu Picchu, a UNESCO World Heritage Site and one of the New Seven Wonders of the World.

== Theme ==
The President of Peru, as host of the summit, chose to dedicate the meeting to "A new commitment to Asia-Pacific Development." In order to foster such commitment, APEC hoped to integrate various sectors of society in meeting its goals, public and private sectors, civil society and international financial institutions. Additional focal points included the development of individuals and the economy, as well as devising a cohesive plan to address regional issues including energy security, personal security, climate change and sustainable economic growth.

Other issues under discussion also included: corporate social responsibility, trade liberalization and the 2008 financial crisis, investment "which aims to establish measures in order to provide greater economic integration and free trade among the Economies", anti-corruption and transparency, climate change issues and new ways to reduce risks regarding environmental matters, regional economic integration, Doha Round support, APEC Reform, structural reform, food security, economic and technical cooperation, and global economic issues and human security.

== Goals ==
According to an official from the host country, it was expected that the leaders of the regional economies would issue a call against protectionism and back free trade, despite the 2008 financial crisis. Prior to the meeting of the national leaders, some 800 business leaders had gathered in Peru for commercial discussions. Senior officials also met behind closed doors to lay out the agenda for the weekend summit. Peru's deputy foreign minister, Gonzalo Gutierrez, said of the meeting before the leaders gathered that "The main theme we followed in this ... meeting is that we should avoid at any cost protectionism." Senior officials sought to use the meeting to follow up on the previous week's G20 meeting in Washington, D.C. In warning against "protectionism" the host country's Foreign Minister, José Antonio García Belaúnde, said that "We reaffirm our opposition to trade and investment barriers. We've [instead] decided to continue supporting the multilateral trade system, including the World Trade Organization, and to support a conclusion to the Doha trade round.

APEC trade and foreign ministers issued a statement before the meeting rejecting trade protectionism and warning about a decline in growth due to the 2008 financial crisis.

U.S. President George W. Bush also set his hopes on leaders of the summit to back the 2008 G-20 Washington summit and declaration to the 2008 financial crisis. He also hoped to foster closer trade ties among the group's 21 members.

Bush's assistant for international economic affairs, Dan Price, said: "Certainly one of our priorities ... would seek to broaden the support for that declaration by having it endorsed by the other members of APEC." He, however, refused to build up talk of such affirmation, "I don't want to pre-judge what it is they will do." Only 9 APEC members were at the previous Washington summit, but as Bush was on his last summit in South America he sought to enlist more states to combat the 2008 financial crisis and the Great Recession.

Canadian prime minister Stephen Harper targeted an expectation that free trade could be the antidote for the global economic crisis running at the time, as he too sought to get support for some sort of a free trade agreement, either informal declarations or formal treaties. His Foreign Affairs Minister, Lawrence Cannon, supported APEC as a follow-up to get a consensus on actions from Washington a week earlier: "My colleagues as well as myself recognize the importance of this particular moment of time, the importance of being able to follow up on the Washington declaration." The president of the Canadian Council of Chief Executives, Tom d'Aquino, also wanted the APEC leaders to push hard to keep markets open. "The worst thing in the world at a time of great difficulty would be if people would try to build up barriers and fortresses against direct foreign investment or the openness of international trade." Moreover, APEC countries were expected to sign on to the G20 action plan's 47-point strategy that endorsed new safeguards for the global financial system.

The Australian Prime Minister Kevin Rudd sought to push for his plan to have a European Union-style forum in the Asia-Pacific region. Rudd's long-term vision was to see a new Asia-Pacific grouping to address the regional economic, security and political challenges. In order to do this, he wanted to see the establishment of a trade bloc that would include such "powerhouse economies" as that of the United States, China and Japan, although he played down a great overhaul by keenly stressing that such a new union would not be a substitute for any current organization including the ASEAN. "Our ambition remains to create an Asia-Pacific community by 2020 that brings together the United States, China, India, Indonesia, Japan and the other countries of the region, with a broad agenda to deal with the political, economic and security challenges of the future. As we know, no such body in the region does that at present."

== Summit weekend ==
After the first day of talks, heads of state issued a statement pledging to push forward on global trade talks and to reform global lending institutions so as to keep the world from sliding into a recession. They also said they would refrain from raising new barriers to investment or trade over the next 12 months. The statement, however, was read in the nonbinding capacity it had and was further devalued as it largely echoed the same conclusions of the Washington meeting a week earlier.

The summit concluded with a declaration to step up to the plate and affirm measures to deal with the global economic crisis.

=== Multilateral meetings ===
==== Cross-strait relations ====
Former Republic of China (Taiwan) Premier and Vice President Lien Chan met with General Secretary of the Chinese Communist Party Hu Jintao for about 40 minutes at a hotel in Lima, Peru. Officials in the Chinese Taipei summit delegation called it the highest-level meeting in an international setting since 1949. This came just weeks after China's envoy Chen Yunlin visited Taipei, Taiwan.

==== Russia–United States ====
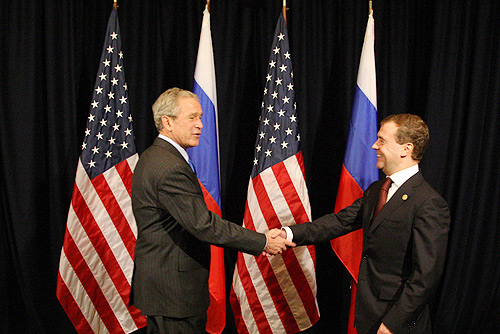
President of Russia Dmitry Medvedev meeting with President of the United States George W. Bush at the APEC Summit on 23 November

Bush held his last meeting as U.S. president with a Russian leader, meeting with Russian President Dmitry Medvedev. Bush talked about the meeting, adding that "It's an interesting moment because I've had a lot of meetings with Dmitry and Vladimir Putin. This will be my last meeting as the sitting president with the leader of Russia. We've had our agreements. We have had our disagreements. I've tried to work hard to make it a cordial relationship so when we need to work together we can, and when we disagree we're able to do so in a way that is respectful to our two nations." Medvedev added that "Generally, despite the existence of points in which we strongly differ, we have worked well and will continue this work."

Their discussion included the Georgia conflict and missile defence to Iran's nuclear program. The two also agreed to explore a joint strategy towards the bout of piracy off the Horn of Africa. Russian Foreign Minister Sergei Lavrov concluded that "The meeting went in a very good atmosphere, with both leaders understanding the importance of relations between the two countries. There was a clear desire not to get obsessed with differences." White House spokeswoman Dana Perino also added that "President Bush and President Medvedev had a cordial, but honest and direct exchange. They discussed a variety of issues, including our differences on Georgia, which continue."

==== Canada, Mexico, Hong Kong ====
In discussing the repercussion of the global economic crisis, Hong Kong's leader, Donald Tsang, joined other leaders in signaling a need for "Strengthening global free trade and investment: which should be key priorities?" He also stressed the need to support the WTO in order to achieve global trade liberalization to reduce poverty, as he added that "The world is convulsed, but we should have a bit of calmness and peace of mind. It's time to share experiences and knowledge to build a more coordinated economy." Canada's Harper asked "How does financial crisis affects the APEC agenda: is it necessary to re-think the priorities?" In response he answered that "Direct government involvement in bank regulation, instead of banks led by governments, is the solution for the financial crisis." Mexico's Felipe Calderón talked about the errors made in the lead-up to the current fiasco as he talked about structural reforms that Mexico had carried out in the past year. He added that "Free trade generates public welfare: the market solution and no problem in this crisis;" he then highlighted the growth of economies like China and Peru as he declared "this is where opportunities are."

== Post-summit conclusions ==
Colombia reiterated an interest to be included as a full member of APEC in the future. The country's president, Álvaro Uribe, emphasized the virtues and achievements of Colombia as he also ensured an "absolute respect for private investment."

A declaration by APEC leaders showed a commitment with free markets and an openness of the economy, while they also refrained from raising new barriers to investment or trade in goods and services over the next 12 months.

They addressed the issue of the 2008 financial crisis, saying they had "already taken urgent and extraordinary actions," while stressing that they would "continue to work closely coordinated and integrated to implement further actions to help us deal with this crisis." The Lima Declaration thus proposed concrete measures, such as the regulation and supervision of financial systems, as well as the need to develop more effective standards of corporate administration, with Corporate Social Responsibility. They also supported the Washington Declaration signed by the Group of 20.

Additionally, they also supported the "Action Plan" for the reform of financial markets proposed at the summit. In such manner there was need for "a close macroeconomic cooperation, avoid negative surplus, to support emerging economies and developing countries, and reflect and strengthen the International Financial Institutions." All in all, the declaration supported the firm conviction that "the principles of free trade and investment rules and open trade will continue to guide global growth, job creation and poverty reduction."

Preceded by APEC Australia 2007	APEC meetings 2008	Succeeded by APEC Singapore 2009
