= APEC Japan 2010 =

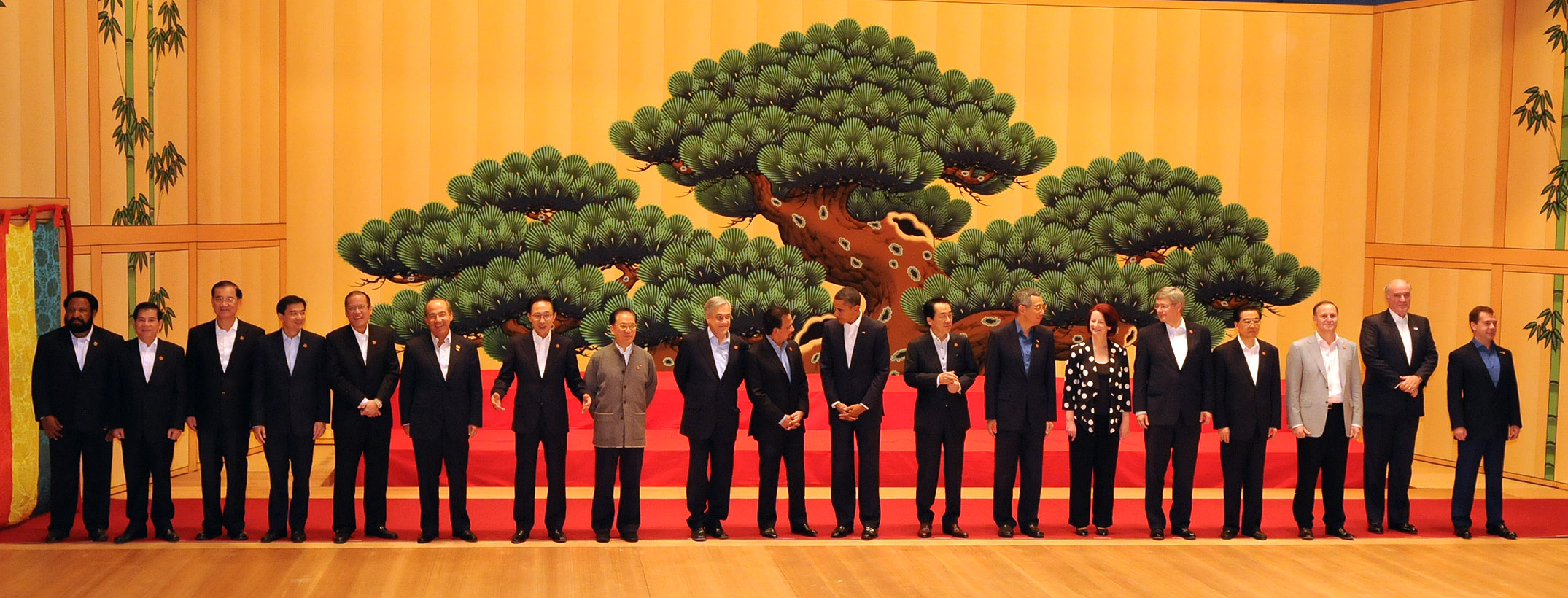
- APEC Japan 2010 Delegates
- Host country: Japan
- Date: 13–14 November
- Motto: Change and Action
- Venues: Yokohama
- Follows: APEC Singapore 2009
- Precedes: APEC United States 2011
- Website: apec2010.go.jp/en/ (archived)

APEC Japan 2010 was a series of political meetings held around Japan between the 21 member economies of the Asia-Pacific Economic Cooperation during 2010. It culminated in the 18th APEC Economic Leaders' Meeting held in Yokohama from November 13–14, 2010. Japan last hosted an APEC summit in 1995 in Osaka.

A major focus of the meetings were the so-called Bogor Goals, as 2010 was the target year for developed members of the Pacific Rim to achieve free trade and investment.

== Theme ==
Change and action was chosen to represent the need for APEC to build upon its past successes to propose necessary "changes" and execute concrete "actions" during the period of significant change in the global political and economic order to ensure that it will continue to play an important and relevant role in the 21st century.

== Issues ==
=== Post-Crisis Economic Recovery & Growth Strategy ===
Leaders focused on transitioning from emergency stimulus to long-term "balanced, sustainable, and inclusive" growth. This involved addressing currency volatility, reducing excessive current account imbalances, and promoting domestic demand-led growth.

=== Regional Economic Integration (FTAAP) ===
A major focus was concrete steps to advance the Free Trade Area of the Asia-Pacific (FTAAP), aiming to link advanced and developing economies across Asia and Latin America.

=== The "Yokohama Vision" ===
The 2010 Leaders' Declaration aimed to solidify the "Bogor Goals" (free and open trade by 2010/2020) and set a new, long-term vision for regional cooperation.

=== Structural Reform & Governance ===
Reports highlighted the need for better corporate governance, including protecting shareholder rights and improving board effectiveness to attract investment.

=== Non-Economic Threats (Human Security) ===
Discussions emphasized food security, energy security, and strengthening responses to pandemics (specifically referencing lessons from the 2009 H1N1 influenza).

=== Environmental Protection ===
The 2010 Leaders' Growth Strategy recognized the need for environmental protection, addressing climate change, and promoting green growth.

=== APEC Structural Reform ===
Initiatives were launched to improve the efficiency of the APEC Secretariat itself.

== Outcomes ==
The outcomes of the 2010 APEC Leaders’ Meeting have the potential to significantly influence economies across the Asia-Pacific region and beyond. As these economies continue to drive global economic growth, the effects of APEC’s initiatives are felt worldwide, highlighting the importance of its decisions and accomplishments.

The annual APEC Summit in Japan concluded last week following four days of discussions among leaders of the world’s major economies. Focused on addressing the global economic crisis, participating nations made progress toward one of the summit’s primary objectives: initiating the development of the Free Trade Area of the Asia-Pacific (FTAAP). This initiative seeks to strengthen economic ties between advanced economies and developing nations across Asia and Latin America. To examine the outcomes of the Yokohama Summit and their implications for the region’s future, Asia Society will host a post-APEC Summit panel discussion titled “Seeking Prosperity After Crisis” in New York on November 30. The event will feature a conversation between U.S. Senior Official for APEC Kurt Tong and Monica Whaley. The program will also highlight important private sector initiatives designed to support the United States’ hosting of APEC 2011.

•Free Trade Area of the Asia-Pacific (FTAAP): Leaders agreed to develop the FTAAP as a major regional undertaking, building upon ongoing regional undertakings like ASEAN+3 and TPP.

•The Yokohama Vision (Bogor Goals): Leaders adopted the "Yokohama Vision—Which Way for APEC," declaring that the 2010 Bogor Goals of free and open trade and investment had been met by industrialized members and outlining further actions for developing economies.

•Growth Strategy: A comprehensive strategy for high-quality, balanced, and sustainable growth was adopted to ensure a resilient post-crisis economic recovery.

•Supply-Chain Connectivity: A new framework was launched to streamline logistics and strengthen supply chain connectivity to reduce the time, cost, and uncertainty of business transactions in the region.

•Food Security: The Niigata Declaration on APEC Food Security was adopted, highlighting the role of trade and cooperation in addressing price spikes and agricultural sustainability.

== See also ==
- Asia-Pacific Economic Cooperation

Preceded by APEC Singapore 2009	APEC meetings 2010	Succeeded by APEC United States 2011
