= APEC South Korea 2025 =

APEC annual meeting

APEC 2025 KOREA 2025 아시아태평양경제협력체

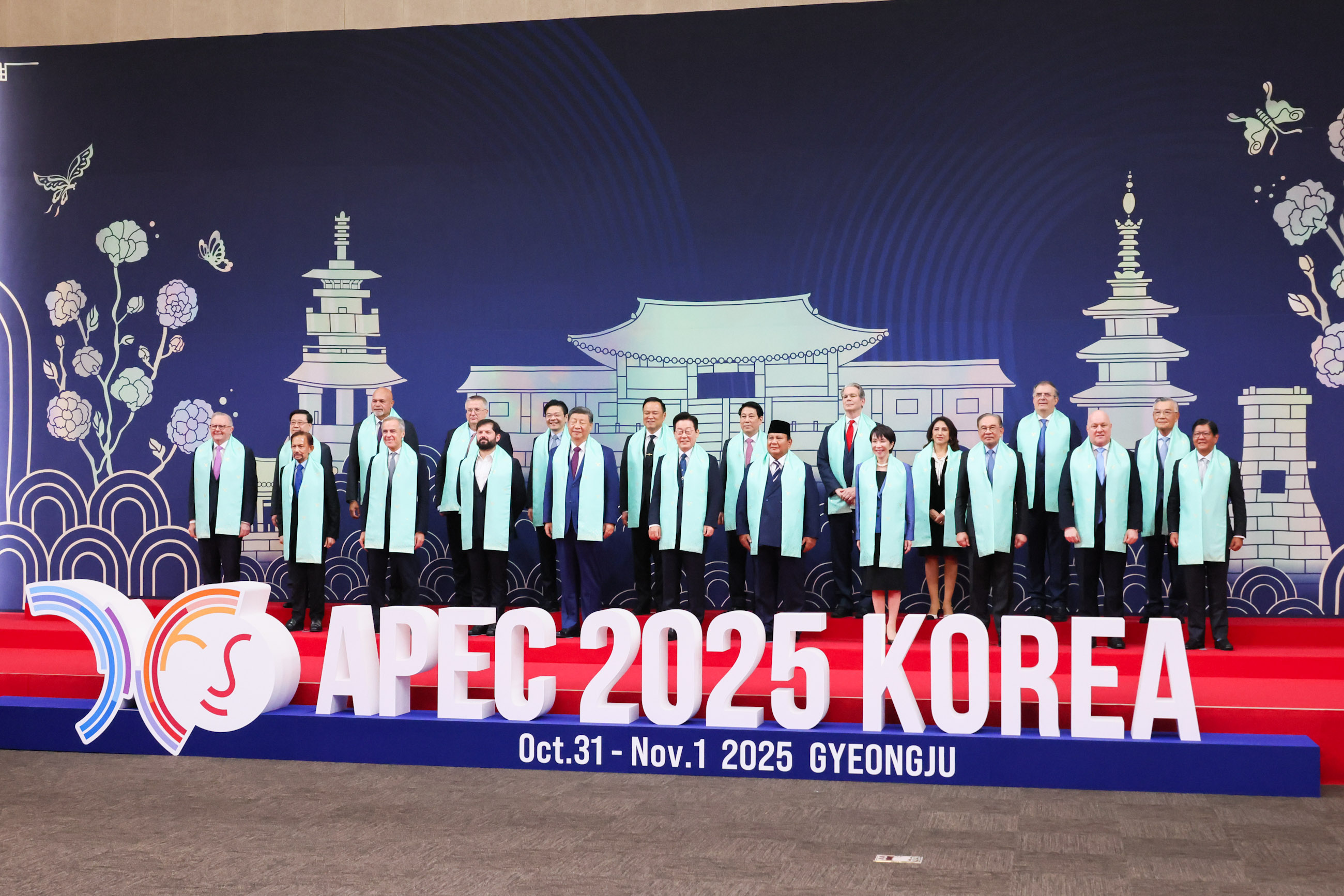
- APEC family photo in Gyeongju
- Host country: South Korea
- Date: October 31 – November 1, 2025
- Motto: Building a Sustainable Tomorrow: Connect, Innovate, Prosper (Korean: 우리가 만들어가는 지속가능한 내일: 연결, 혁신, 번영)
- Venues: Main venue Gyeongju Hwabaek International Convention Center Other meetings
- Follows: APEC Peru 2024
- Precedes: APEC China 2026
- Website: apec2025.kr (archived)

External view of the HICO venue

The APEC South Korea 2025 (officially stylized as APEC 2025 Korea) was a year-long hosting of the Asia-Pacific Economic Cooperation (APEC) meetings, which concluded with the APEC Economic Leaders' Meeting on November 1, 2025. It was the second time South Korea hosted the summit, having previously hosted in 2005.

== Preparations ==
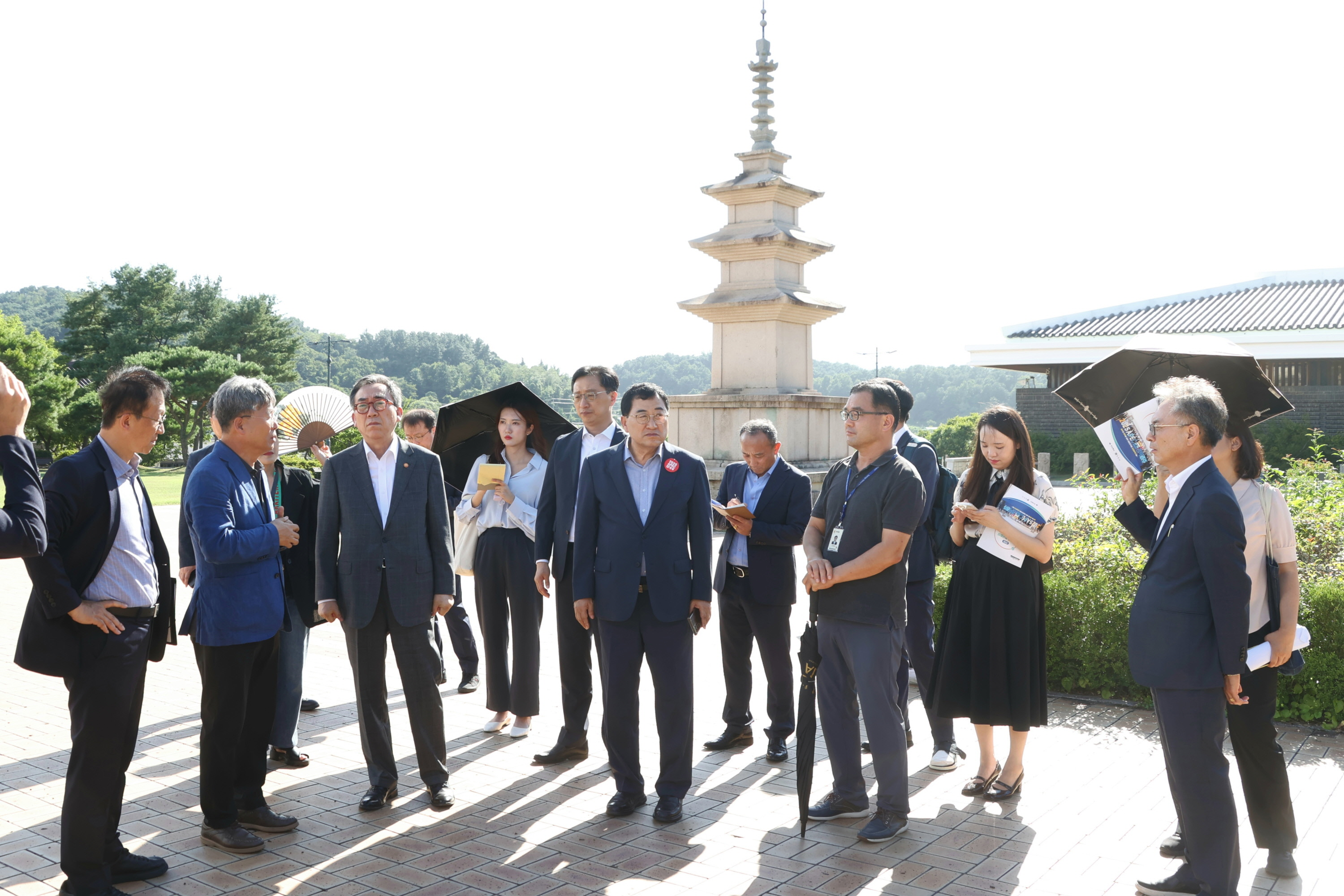
South Korean then-foreign minister Cho Tae-yul visits the Gyeongju National Museum in Gyeongju, August 2024

In March 2024, the Ministry of Foreign Affairs of South Korea formed the 2025 APEC Summit Host City Selection Committee and began the process of selecting the host city. The committee was led by Yoon Jin-sik, chairperson of the Korea International Trade Association, and had 17 members including government officials and private members. At the second meeting of the selection committee the same month, applications from each local government were reviewed, and Gyeongju, Incheon and Jeju Province were selected as the three finalists.

On May 28, the South Korean government held a ceremony to unveil the 2025 APEC Summit Preparation Committee and began full-scale preparations. This committee had 33 members ranging from government ministries and economic organizations.

In June, the host city was finally confirmed as Gyeongju. In August, the Ministry of Foreign Affairs' APEC Preparatory Planning Team, including Minister of Foreign Affairs Cho Tae-yul visited Gyeongju and inspected key facilities to be used during the summit. The Gyeongju Hwabaek International Convention Center was used as the main conference hall.

== Participants ==
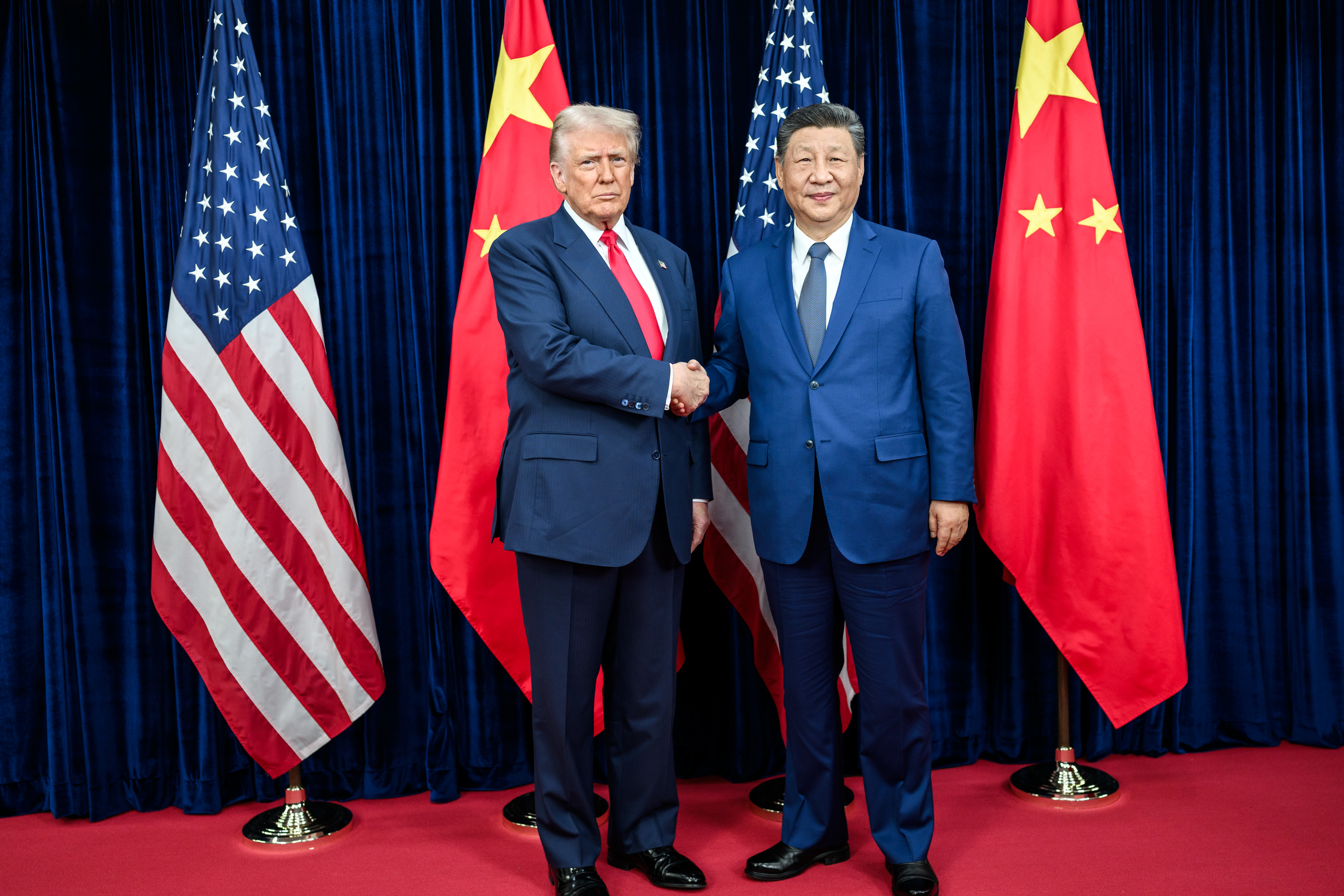
U.S. President Donald Trump and Chinese leader Xi Jinping at the summit meeting in Busan, South Korea, October 30, 2025

APEC South Korea 2025 was the first Asia-Pacific Economic Cooperation (APEC) meeting for U.S. president Donald Trump in his second presidency, (Note: U.S. president Donald Trump only attended the APEC CEO Summit and the U.S.–APEC Leaders Working Dinner, skipping the APEC Economic Leaders' Meeting, which was attended by treasury secretary Scott Bessent instead.) who re-assumed the presidency on January 20, 2025, he would have had to attend his second in-person meeting having previously attended in the 2017 summit during his first presidency; Canadian prime minister Mark Carney, who assumed the premiership on March 14; South Korean president and host Lee Jae Myung, who assumed office on June 4; and Japanese prime minister Sanae Takaichi, who assumed the premiership on October 21.

Republic of China president Lai Ching-te appointed Lin Hsin-i as Chinese Taipei's representative to the summit, marking Lin's third time representing Chinese Taipei at the summit.

Russian president Vladimir Putin did not attend the summit, as South Korea is a state party to the International Criminal Court (ICC), which has issued an arrest warrant against Putin over alleged war crimes related to the Russo-Ukrainian war. It was therefore highly likely that South Korea's Ministry of Justice would be obligated to implement the warrant should Putin enter the country. As a result, Russian deputy prime minister Alexey Overchuk represented Russia at the summit, as he had done in 2023 and in 2024.

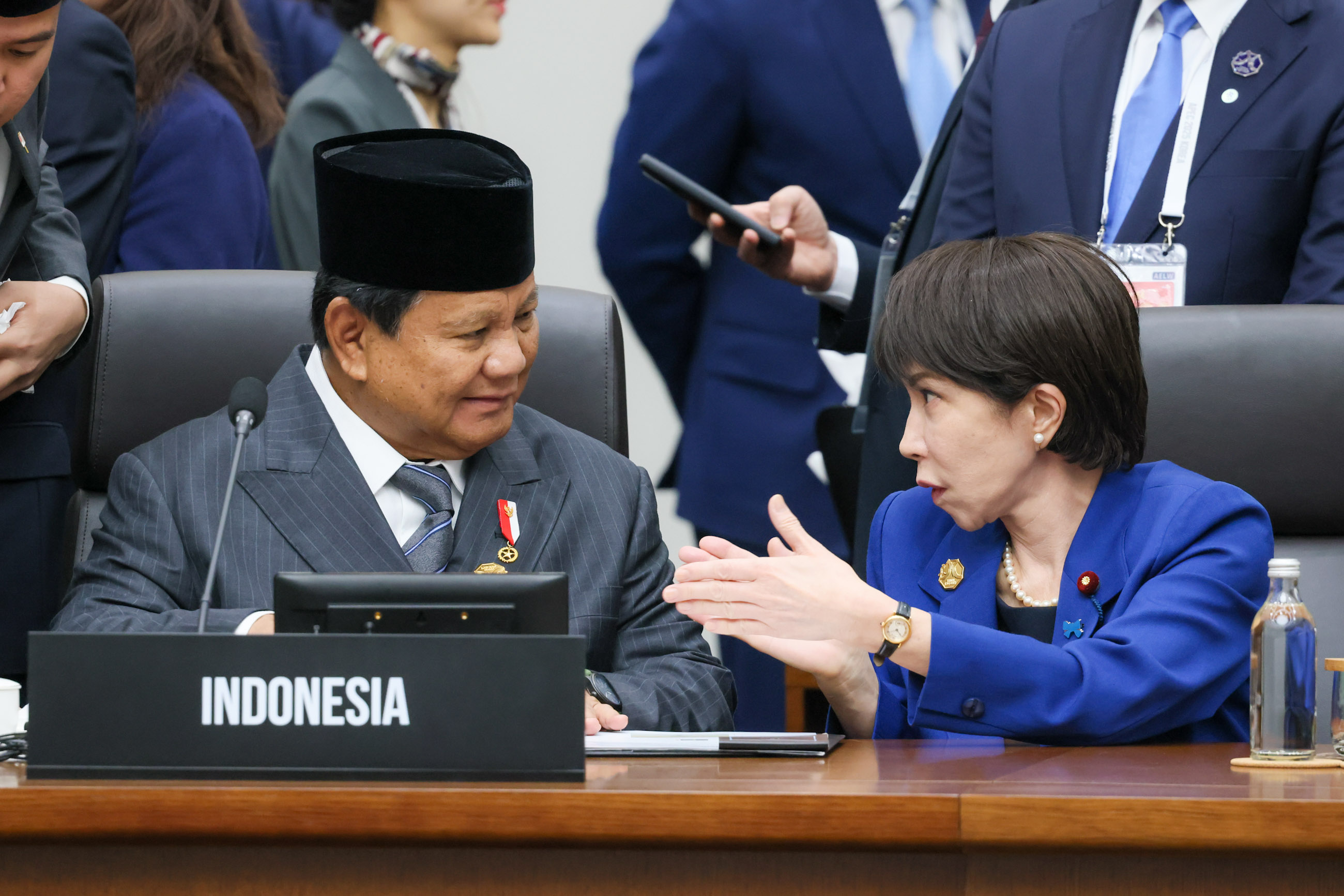
Indonesian President Prabowo Subianto with Japanese Prime Minister Sanae Takaichi

It's also the second APEC meeting which Mexican President Claudia Sheinbaum (who assumed the presidency on October 1, 2024, after opting to skip the 2024 APEC meeting in Peru) and Papua New Guinean Prime Minister James Marape didn't attend in-person, and both designated Mexican Economic Secretary Marcelo Ebrard and Deputy Prime Minister John Rosso as their respective representatives. Peruvian president José Jerí, who took office on October 10, also didn't participate in-person and designed Foreign Trade and Tourism Minister Teresa Mera Gómez as his representative to the summit.

Trump did not attend the APEC Economic Leaders' Meeting (AELM), participating only in the APEC CEO Summit and the U.S.–APEC Leaders' Working Dinner before departing South Korea on October 30. Treasury secretary Scott Bessent represented the U.S. at the AELM.

Thai prime minister Anutin Charnvirakul, who assumed office on September 7, was initially expected to skip his first APEC meeting following the death of Queen Sirikit The Queen Mother on October 24, 2025. Her death prompted a year-long mourning period for Thai government officials and a 90-day mourning period for the general public. However, Anutin later reversed his decision and attended the summit as initially planned.

On the other hand, this was the last APEC meeting for Chilean President Gabriel Boric following the 2025 Chilean general election.

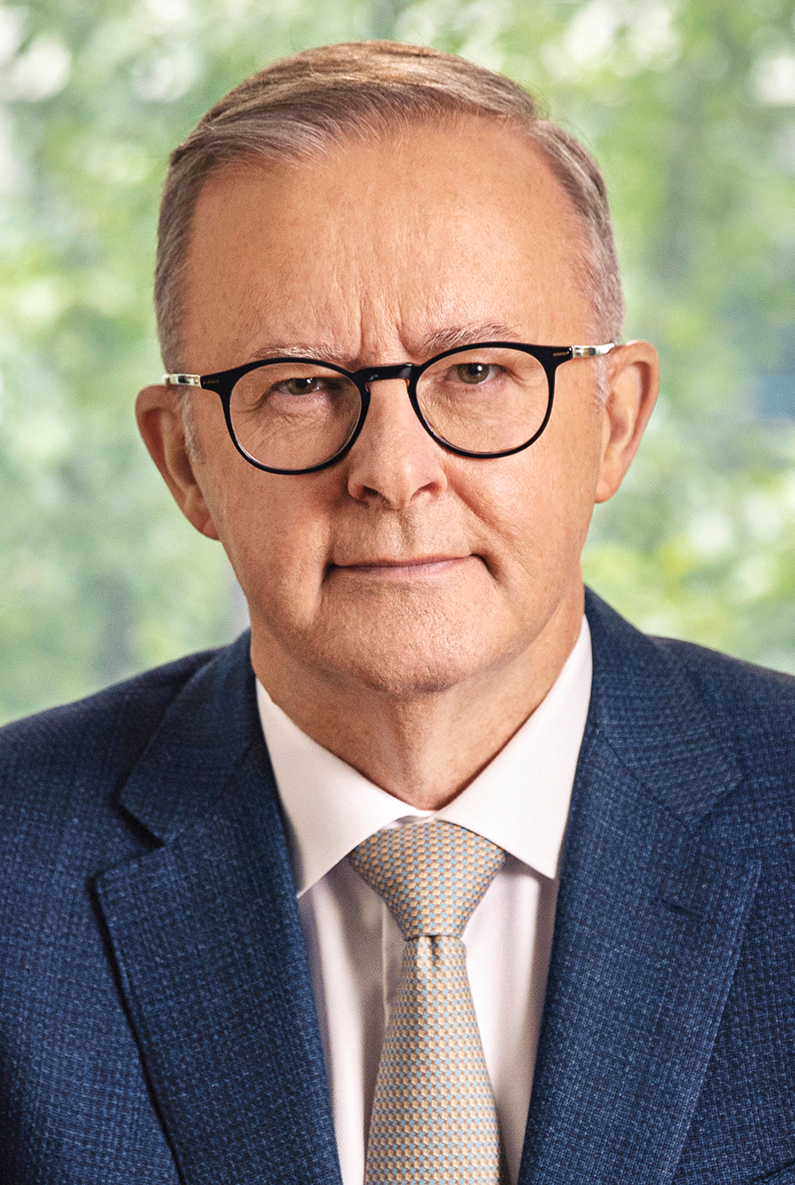
Australia
Anthony Albanese,
Prime Minister

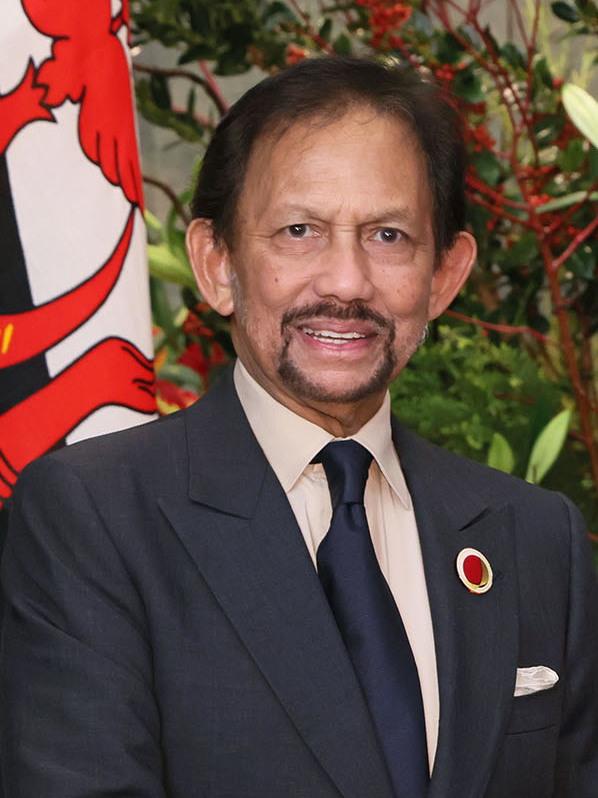
Brunei
Hassanal Bolkiah,
Sultan

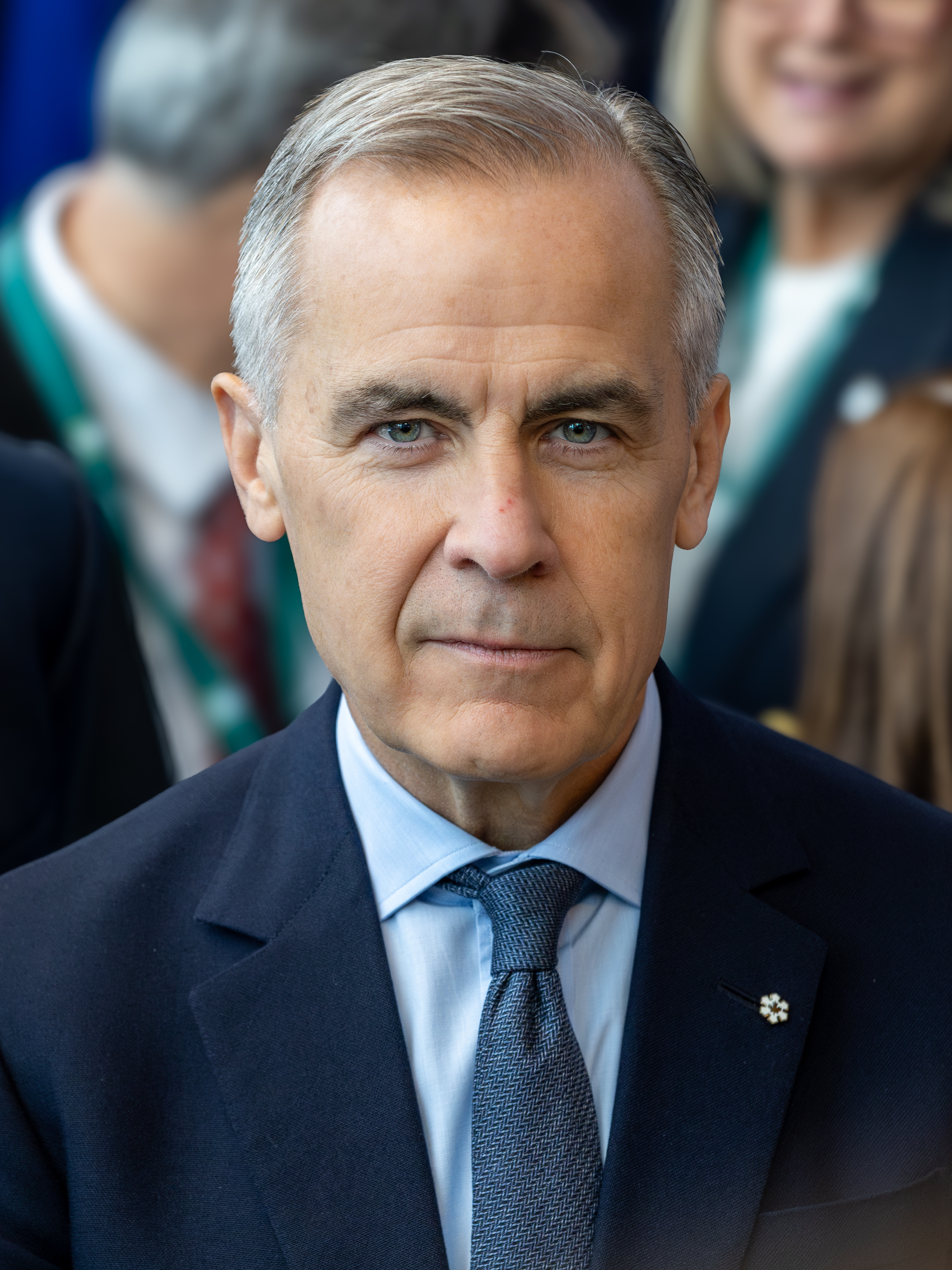
Canada
Mark Carney,
Prime Minister

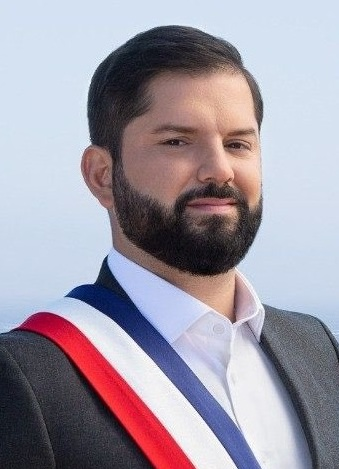
Chile
Gabriel Boric,
President

China
Xi Jinping,
CCP General Secretary and President (Note: The president of China is legally a ceremonial office, but the general secretary of the Chinese Communist Party (de facto leader in a one-party communist state) has always held this office since 1993 except for the months of transition.)

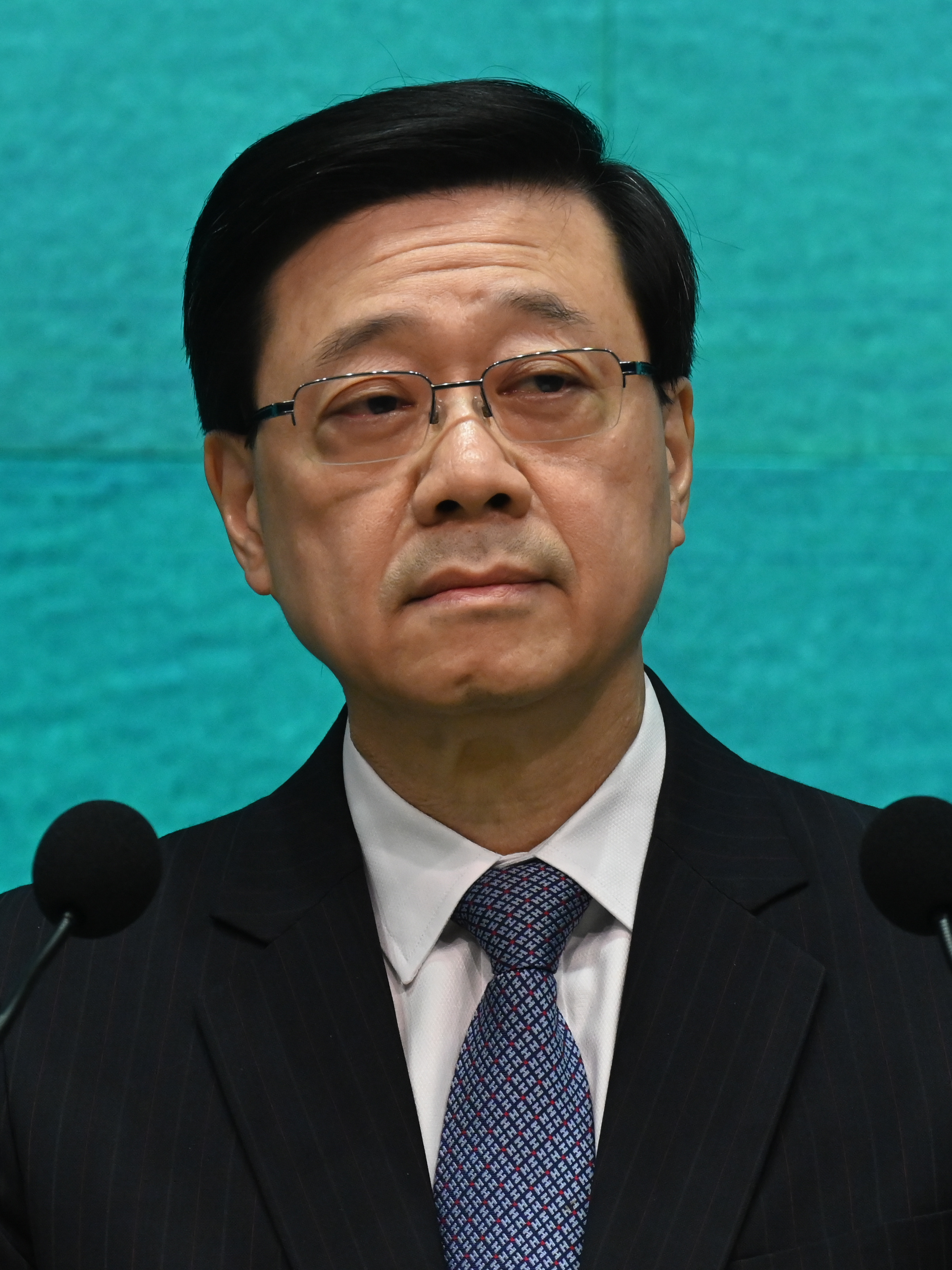
Hong Kong
John Lee Ka-chiu,
Chief Executive

Indonesia
Prabowo Subianto,
President

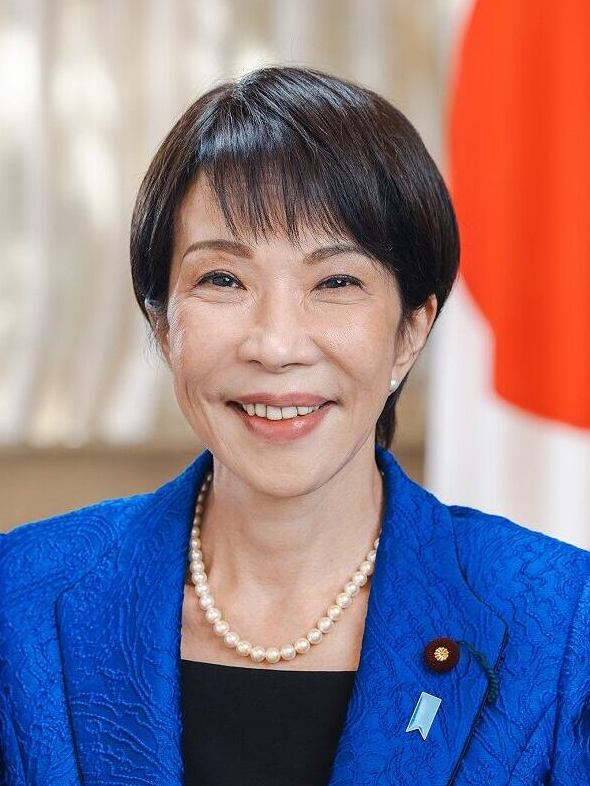
Japan
Sanae Takaichi,
Prime Minister

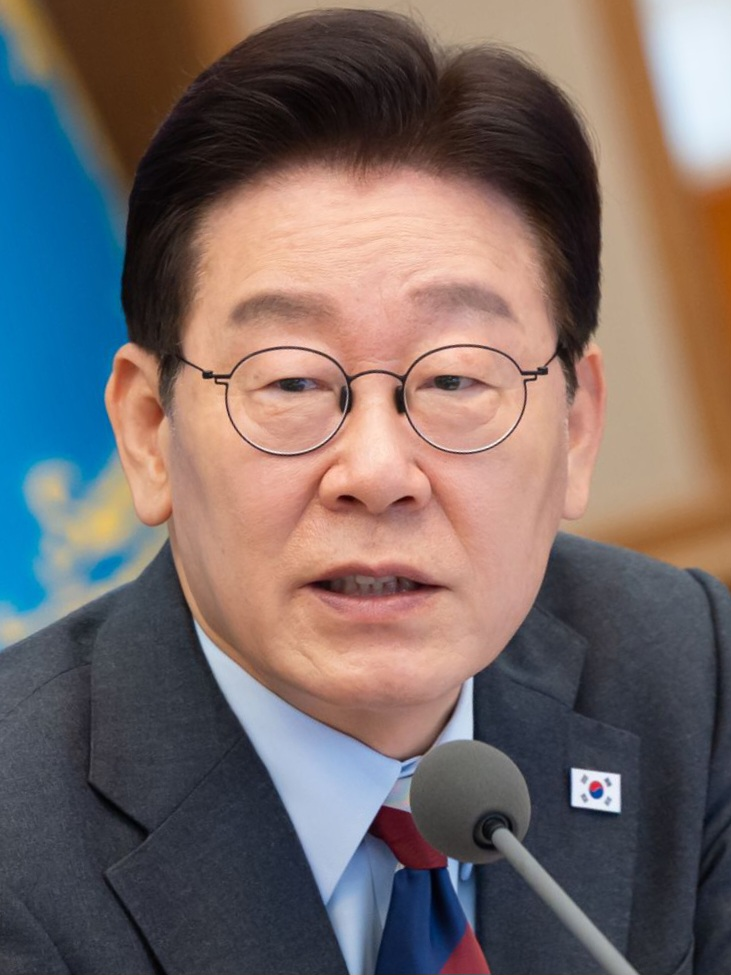
South Korea
Lee Jae Myung,
President (Host)

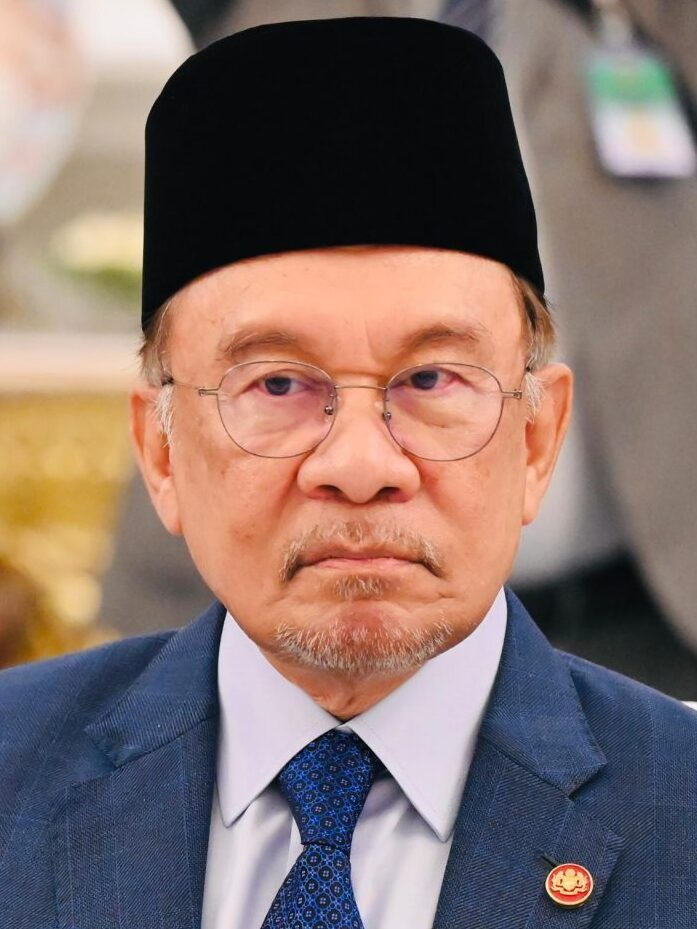
Malaysia
Anwar Ibrahim,
Prime Minister

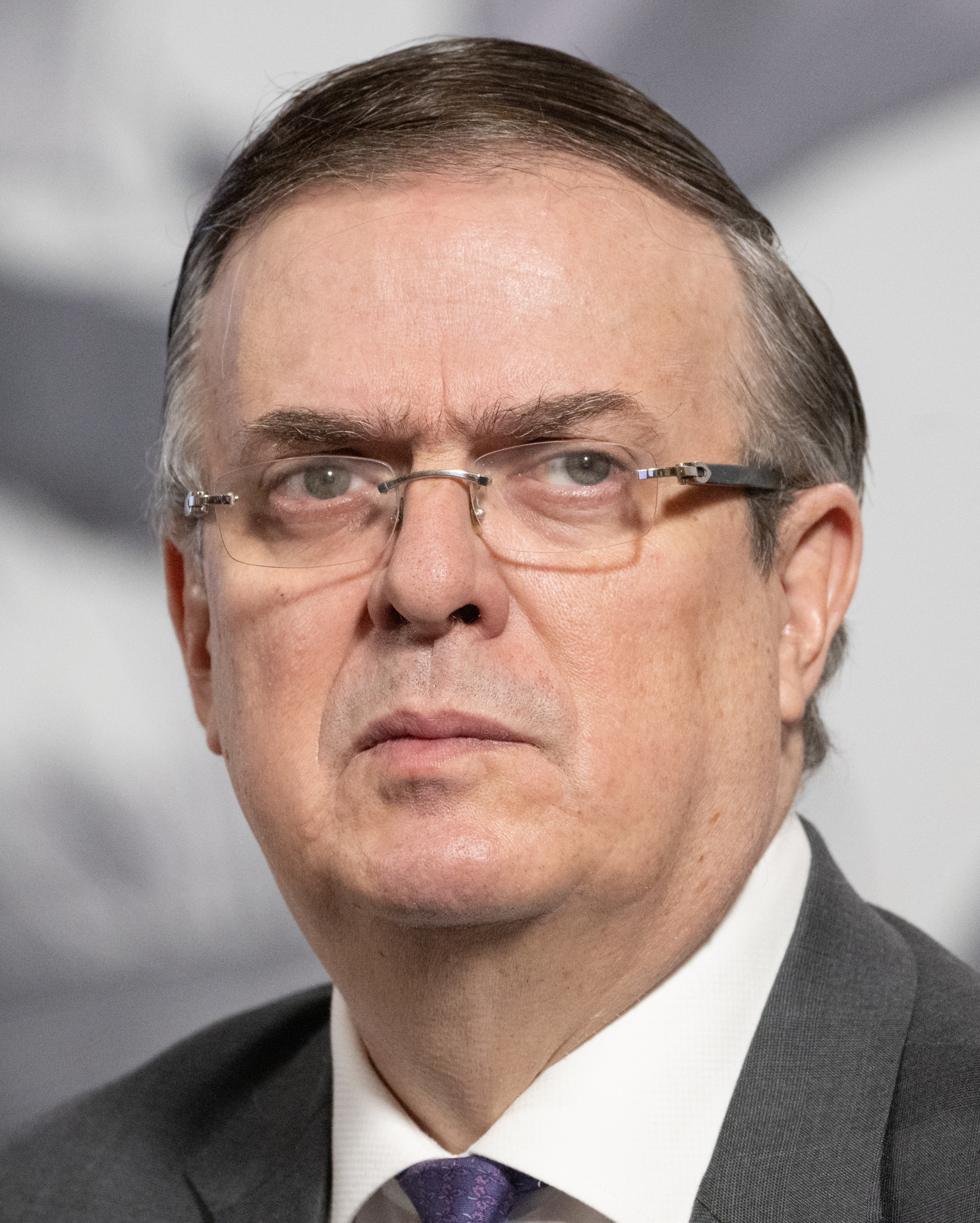
Mexico
Marcelo Ebrard,
Secretary of Economy

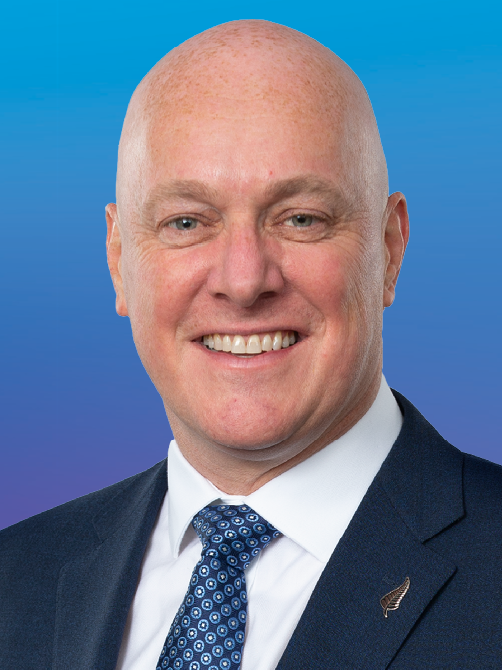
New Zealand
Christopher Luxon,
Prime Minister

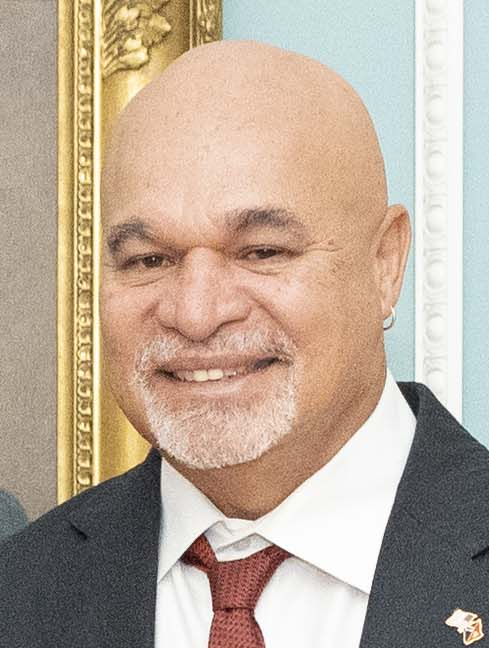
Papua New Guinea
John Rosso,
Deputy Prime Minister

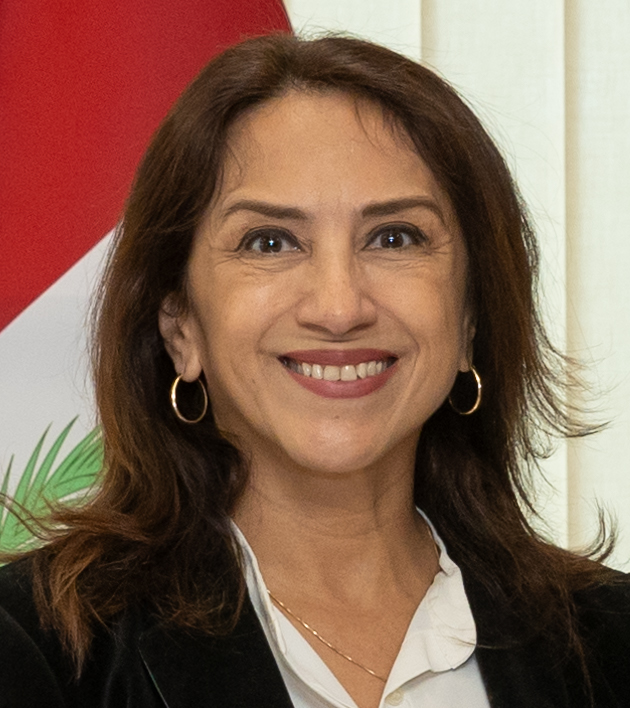
Peru
Teresa Mera Gómez,
Minister of Foreign Trade and Tourism

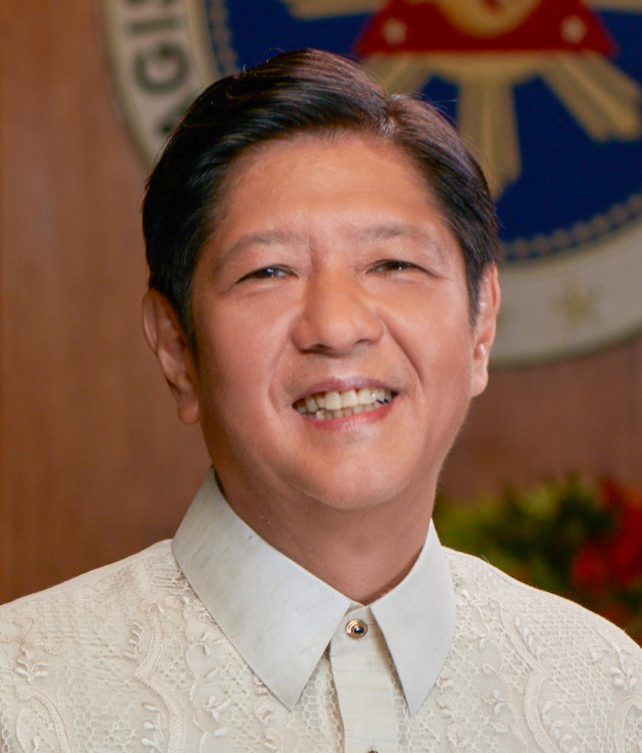
Philippines
Bongbong Marcos,
President

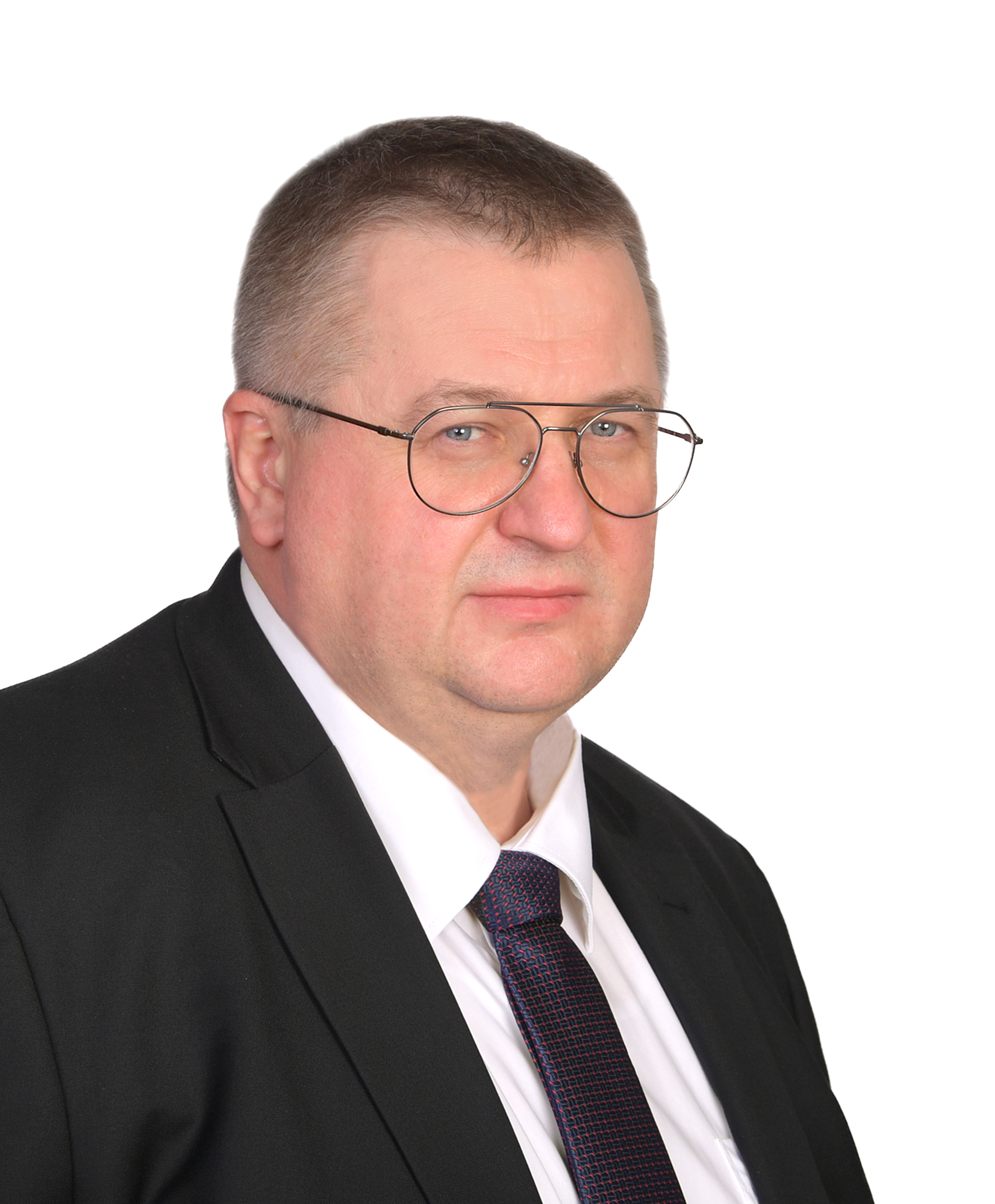
Russia
Alexey Overchuk,
Deputy Prime Minister

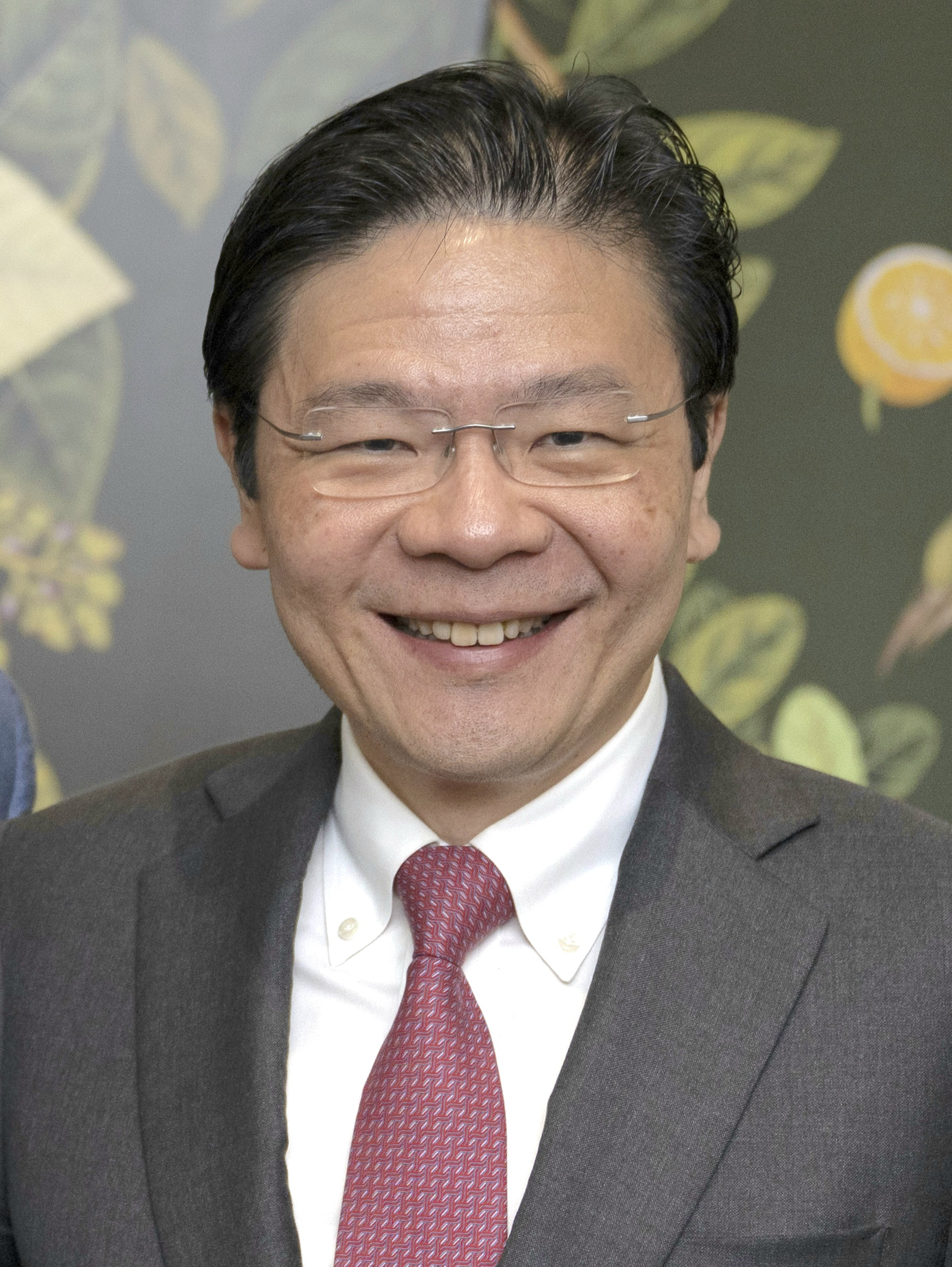
Singapore
Lawrence Wong,
Prime Minister

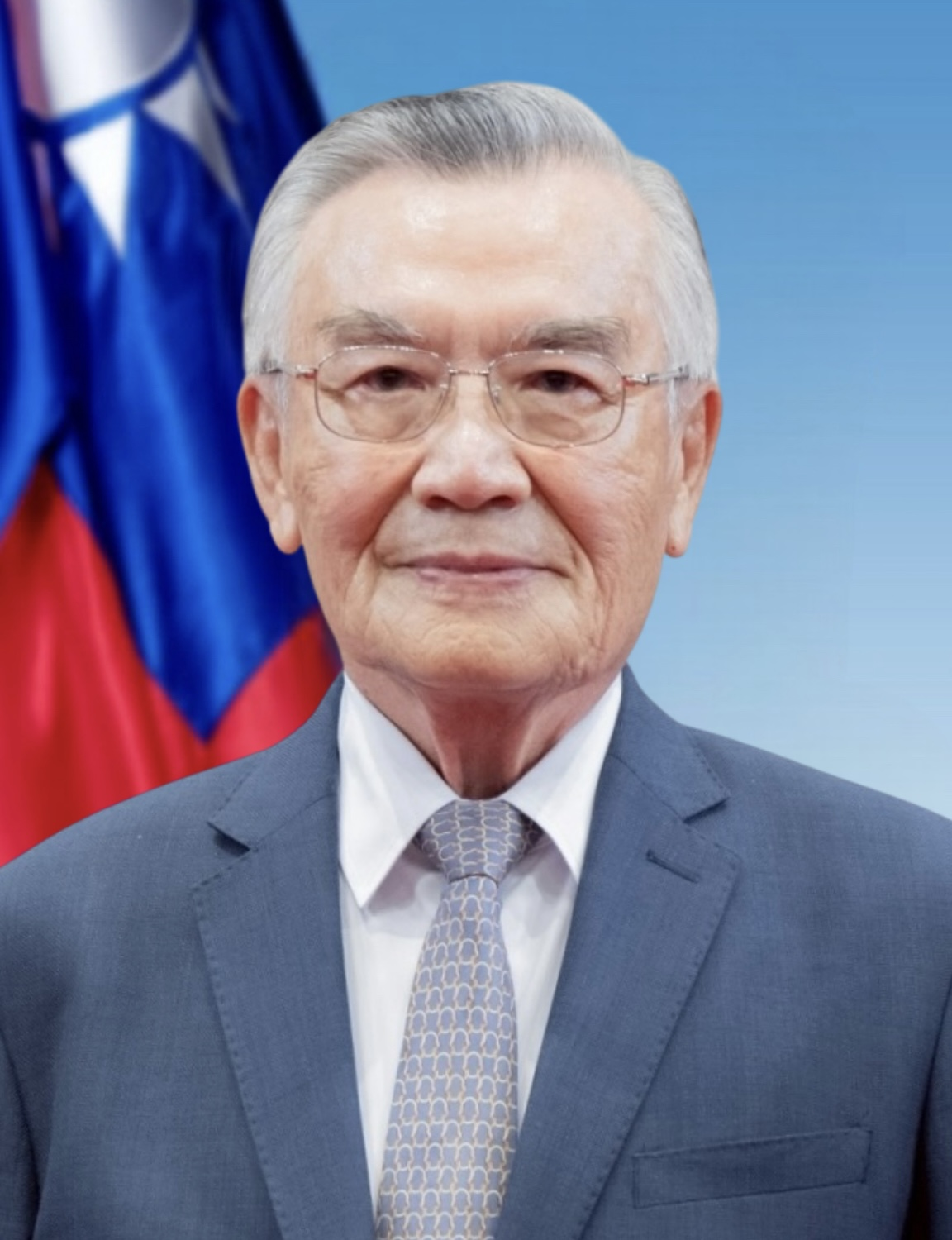
Taiwan
Lin Hsin-i,
Special Representative of Leader (Note: Due to the complexities of the relations between it and the People's Republic of China, the Republic of China (ROC or "Taiwan") was not represented under its official name "Republic of China" or as "Taiwan". Instead, it participates in APEC under the name "Chinese Taipei". The president of the Republic of China does not attend the annual APEC Economic Leaders' Meeting in person. Instead, it was generally represented by a ministerial-level official responsible for economic affairs or someone designated by the president. See List of Chinese Taipei representatives to APEC.)
(representing President Lai Ching-te)

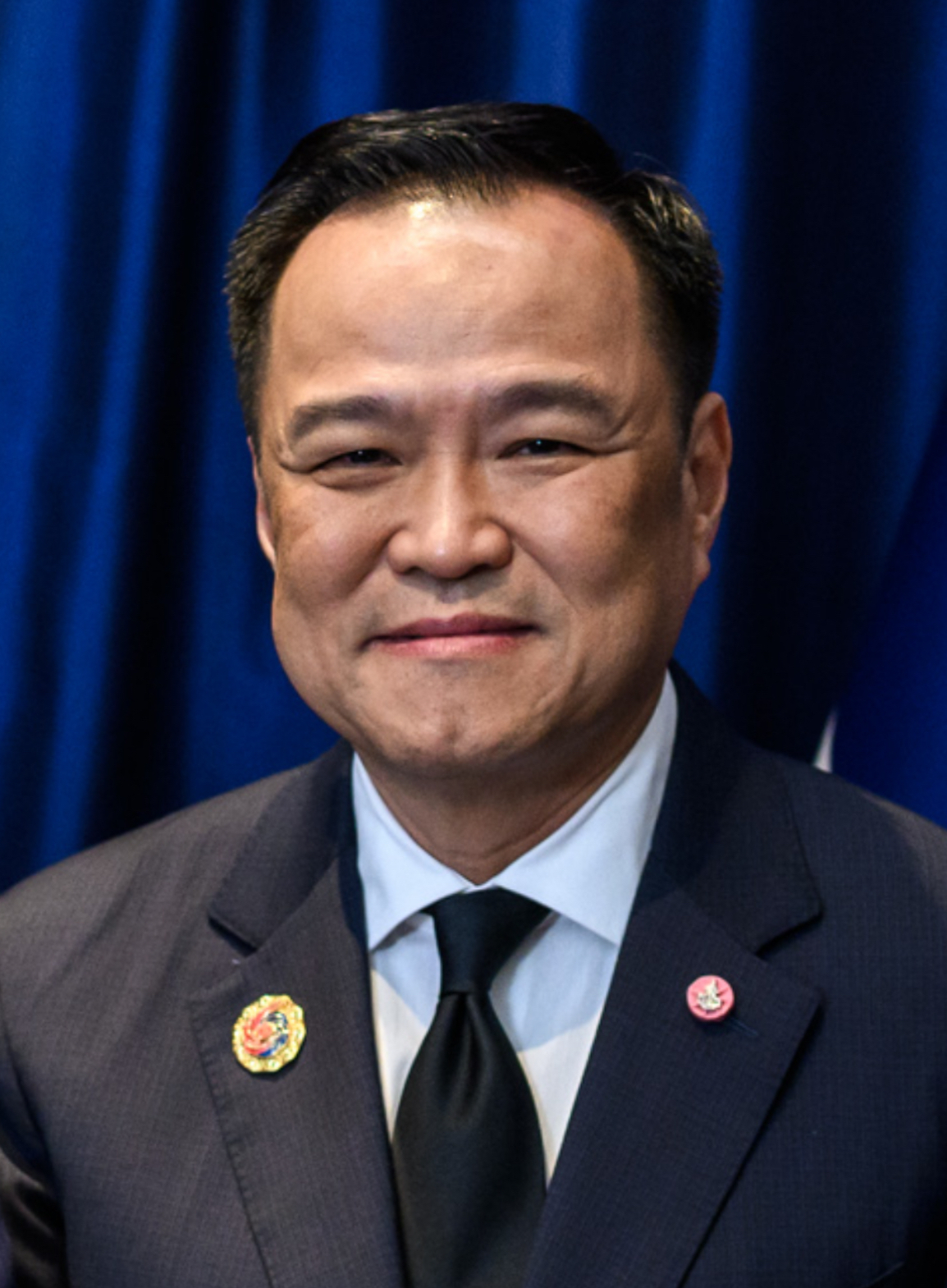
Thailand
Anutin Charnvirakul,
Prime Minister

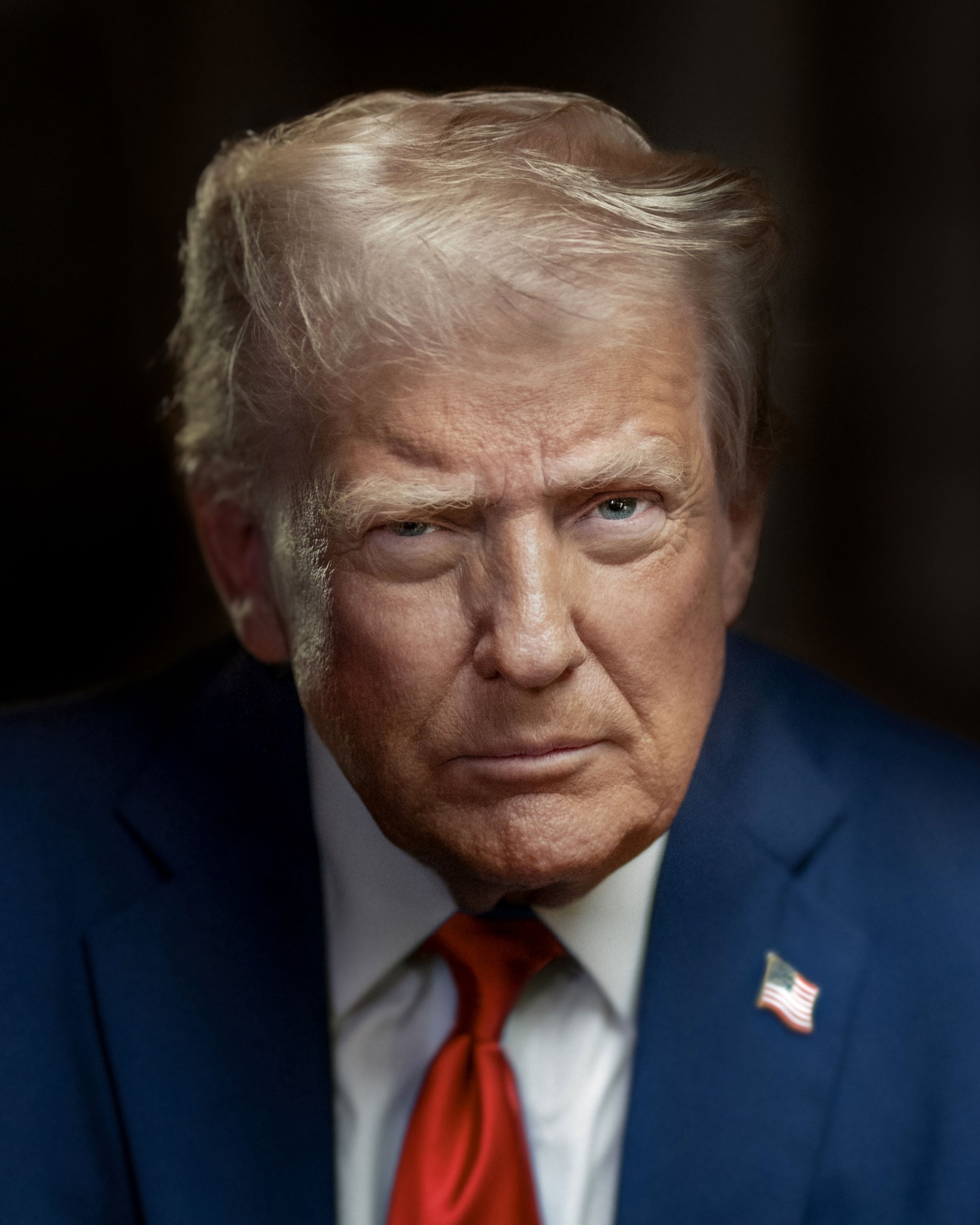
United States
Donald Trump,
President

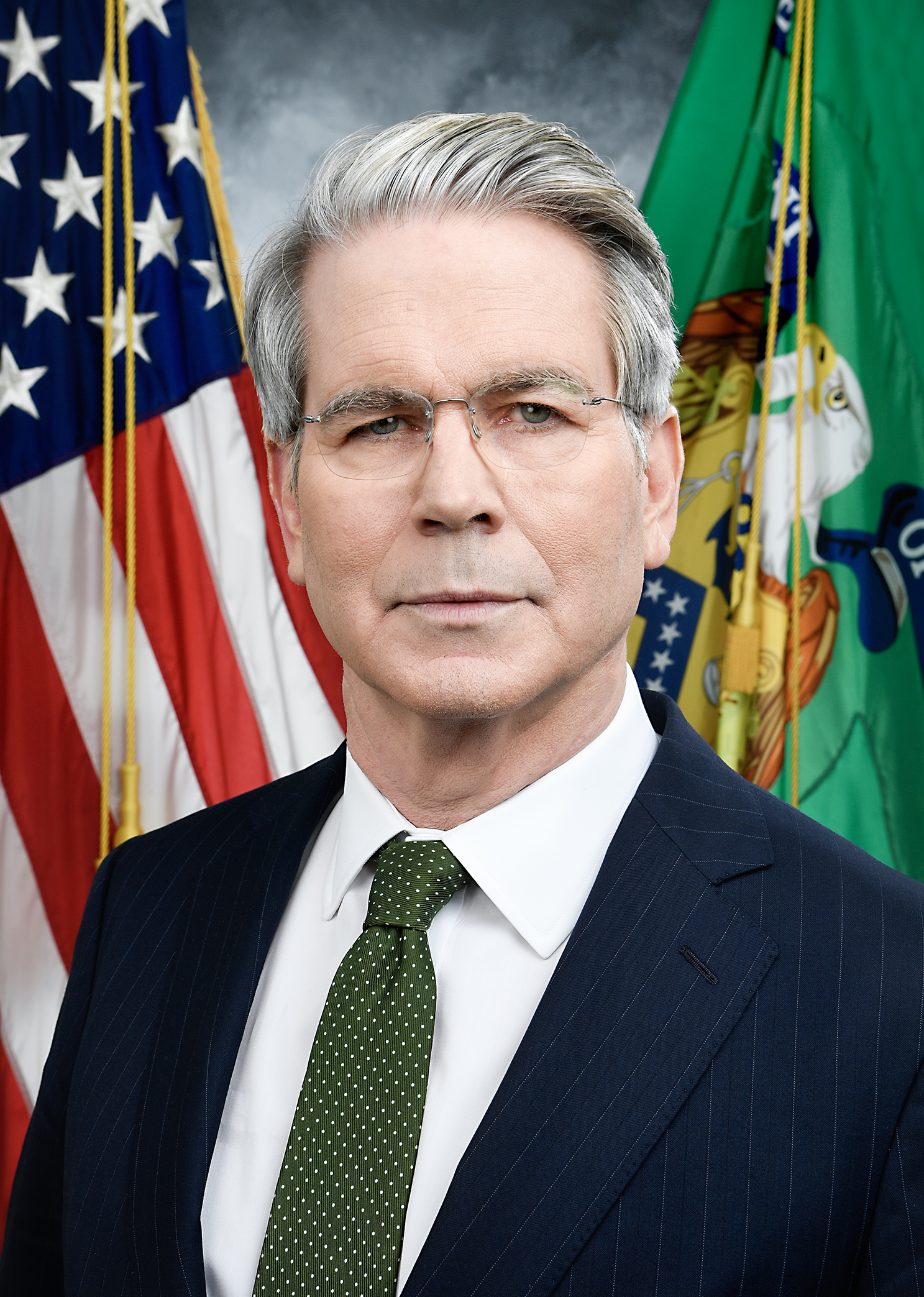
United States
Scott Bessent,
Secretary of the Treasury

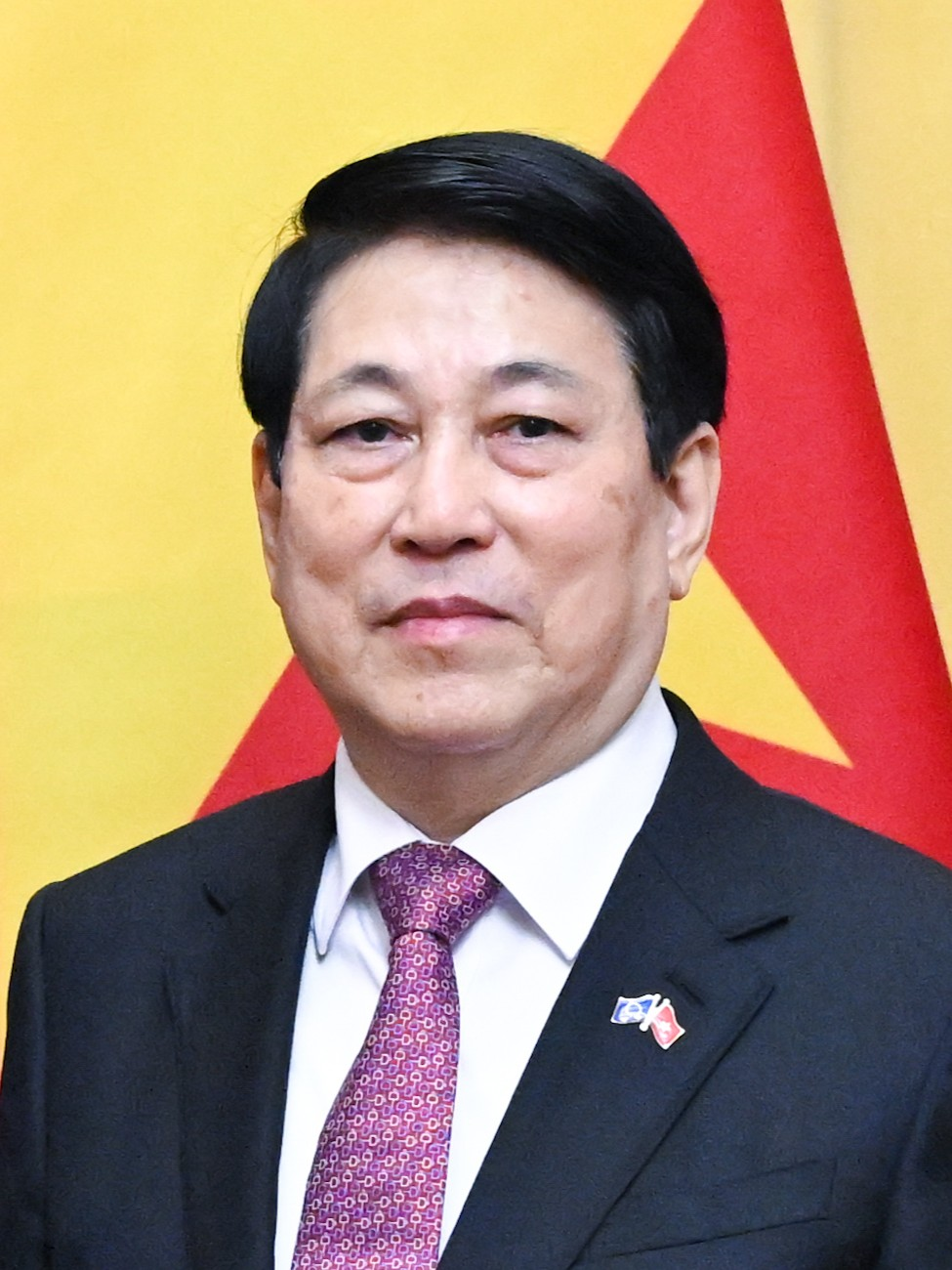
Vietnam
Lương Cường,
President (Note: The actual head of government of Vietnam is the Prime Minister. The President of Vietnam is legally the head of state, but the General Secretary of the Communist Party of Vietnam is the practical highest political leader in a one-party communist state.)

== Invited guests ==
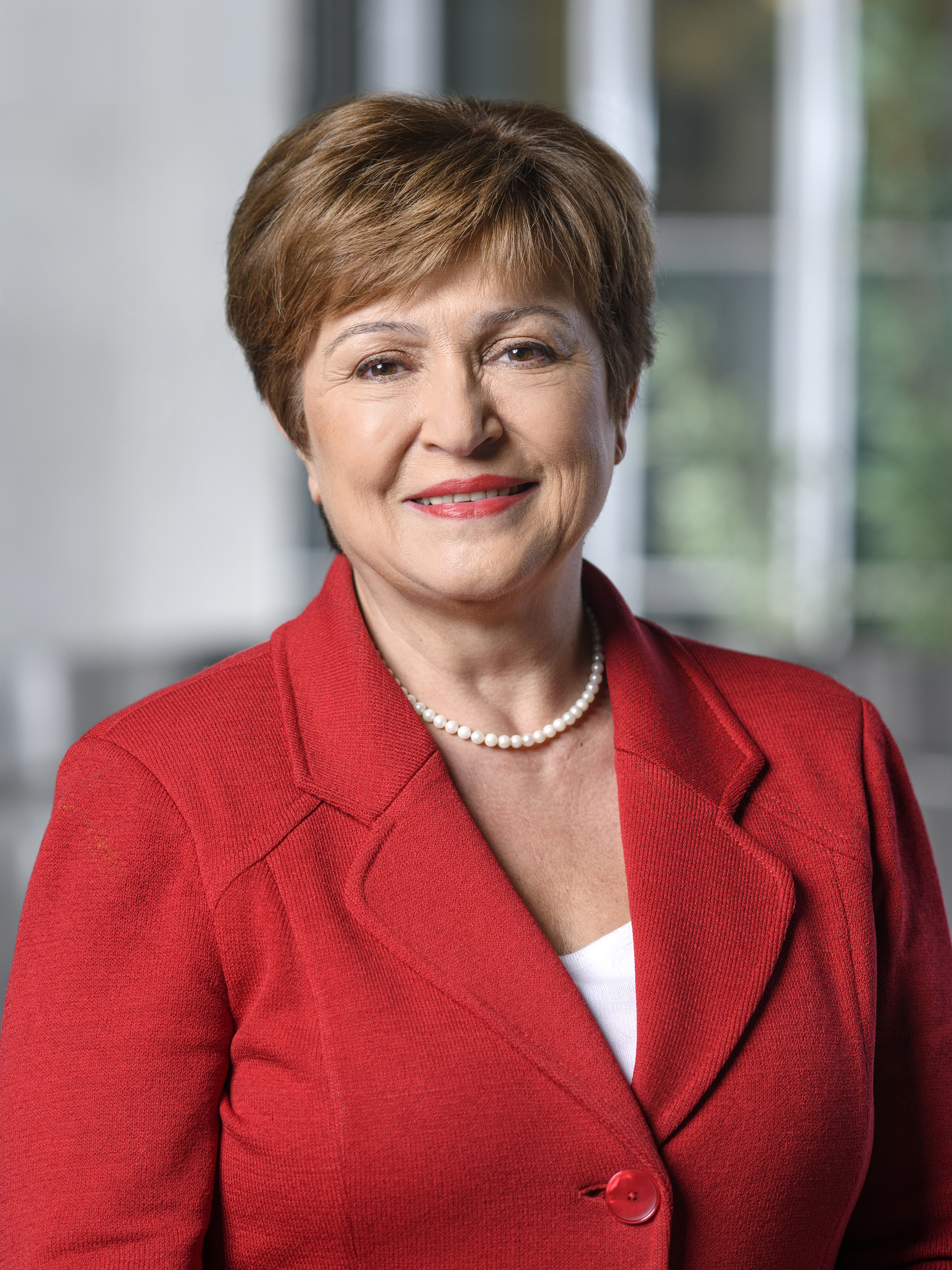
International Monetary Fund
Kristalina Georgieva,
Managing Director

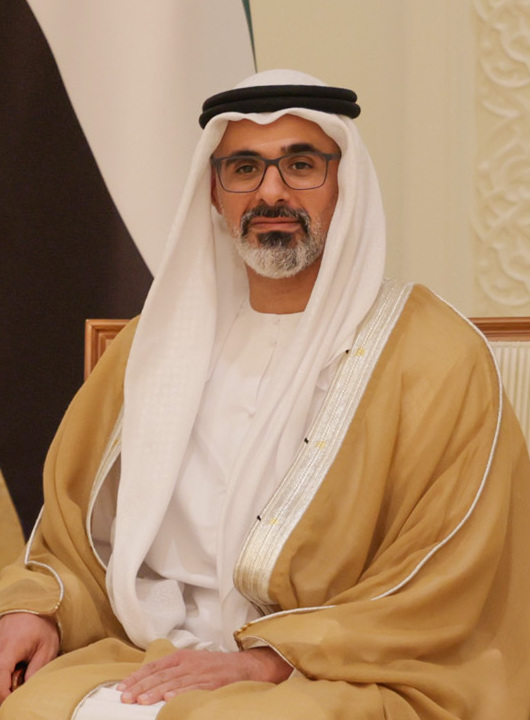
United Arab Emirates
Khaled bin Mohamed Al Nahyan,
Crown Prince of Abu Dhabi

== Events ==
=== CEO Summit ===
The APEC CEO Summit was held on October 28–31 at Gyeongju Arts Center in North Gyeongsang Province. The theme of the summit was "Bridge, Business, Beyond". Notable speakers included : Antony Cook (Vice President - Microsoft), Jensen Huang, Joaquin Duato, Matt Garman (CMO - AWS APAC) and musician RM.

=== Gala dinner ===
The official gala dinner of the APEC Economic Leaders' Meeting was held on the evening of October 31, 2025, at the Lahan Select Hotel in Gyeongju, North Gyeongsang Province. It was hosted by President Lee Jae Myung and First Lady Kim Hye-kyung for approximately 400 guests, including the leaders and spouses of the 21 APEC member economies, representatives of international organizations, and global business leaders.

The multicourse menu was designed by Korean-American celebrity chef Edward Lee and featured a fusion of Korean and Western cuisine prepared with local Gyeongju ingredients.

The cultural performance, themed "Journey of Butterfly: Together, We Fly", was emceed by actor and singer Cha Eun-woo, who was selected to promote K-pop and Korean culture on the global stage while serving his mandatory military service. APEC 2025 Korea ambassador G-Dragon delivered a special performance that included the songs "Power", "Home Sweet Home", and "Drama". The program also featured traditional Korean music and dance, contemporary dance crews, a children's choir, and a closing segment in which a robot dog accompanied young violinist Kim Yeon-ah.

=== Women and economy forum ===
The APEC Women and the Economy Forum (WEF) took place on August 12 at Songdo Convensia in Incheon. The theme of the forum was "Promoting Women's Economic Participation for Sustainable Growth".

== See also ==
- 2025 ASEAN Summits – several leaders attending APEC South Korea 2025 also attended the 47th ASEAN Summit in October 2025

== Notes ==
| Preceded by APEC Peru 2024 | APEC meetings 2025 | Succeeded by APEC China 2026 |
