= APEC Peru 2024 =

APEC annual meeting

APEC 2024 Peru

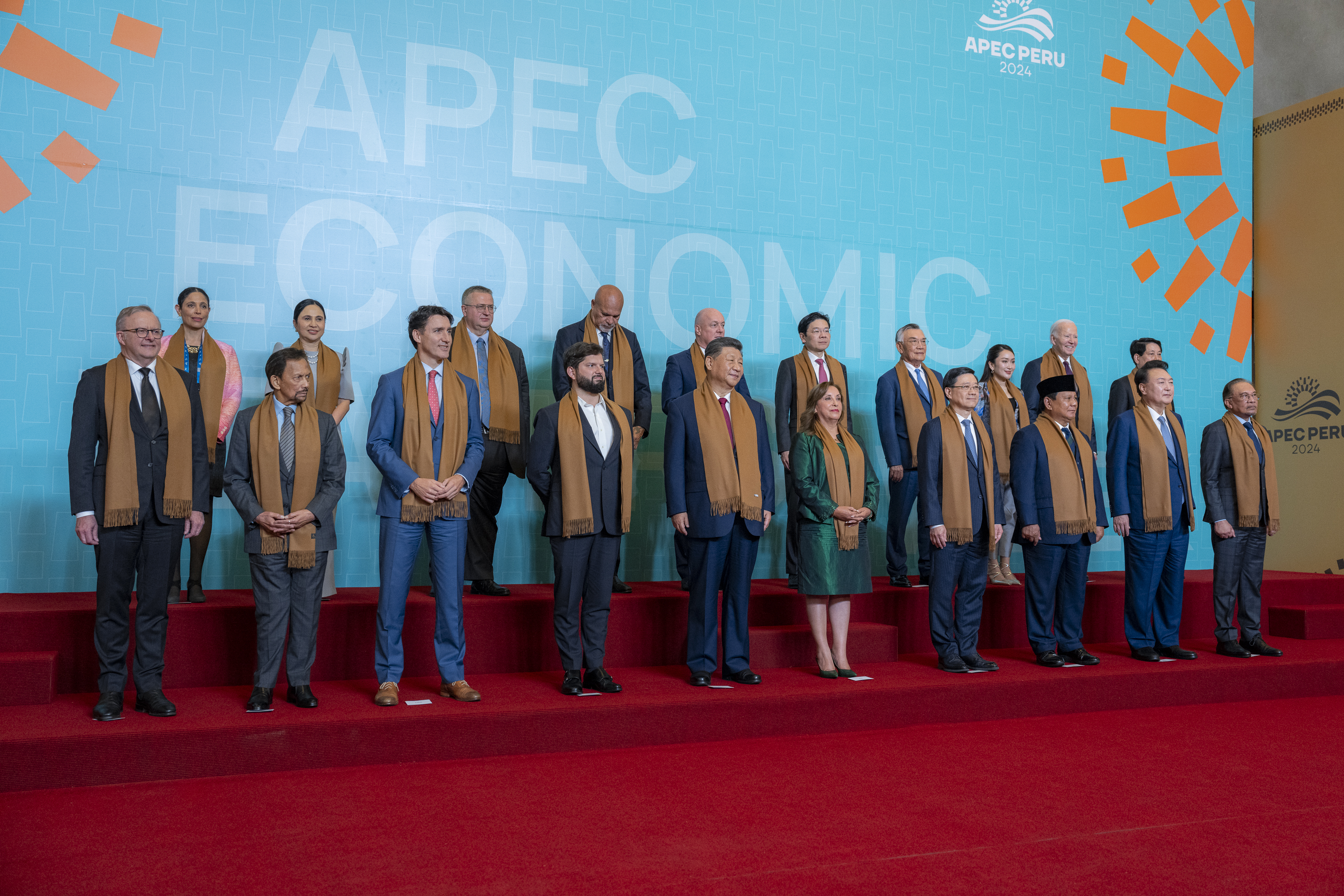
- APEC Peru 2024 delegates
- Host country: Peru
- Date: 15–16 November 2024 (Economic Leaders' Meeting)
- Venues: Main venue Lima Convention Center, Lima Other meetings 5 host locations: Lima; Arequipa; Pucallpa; Trujillo; Urubamba
- Follows: APEC United States 2023
- Precedes: APEC South Korea 2025
- Website: apecperu.pe (archived)

The APEC Peru 2024 was the annual meeting of the Asia-Pacific Economic Cooperation Forum of its leaders that was held from 15 to 16 November 2024. It was the third time Peru has hosted the summit, having previously hosted in 2016 and 2008.

In 2021, Óscar Maúrtua, the minister of foreign affairs of Peru, announced the organization of the 2024 APEC summit. On 10 February 2022, the prime minister of Thailand, Prayut Chan-o-cha, in his capacity as current president of APEC, announced the United States as host of the 2023 meeting and Peru for 2024.

== Participants ==
APEC Peru 2024 was the first APEC meeting for New Zealand Prime Minister Christopher Luxon, who assumed the premiership on 27 November 2023; Singaporean Prime Minister Lawrence Wong, who assumed the premiership on 15 May 2024; Indonesian President Prabowo Subianto, who assumed the presidency on 20 October; and Vietnamese President Lương Cường, who assumed the presidency on 21 October. This meeting would also be Taiwanese President Lai Ching-te's first APEC summit under his presidency, having assumed it on 20 May. However, Lai appointed Lin Hsin-i as Taiwan's representative to the summit; Lin previously represented Taiwan at the 2005 summit.

It was also the last APEC meeting for United States President Joe Biden after withdrawing from the 2024 U.S. presidential election and the second inauguration of Donald Trump, Canadian Prime Minister Justin Trudeau after his resignation on 6 January 2025 and following the 2025 Canadian federal election, South Korean President Yoon Suk Yeol due to the impeachment upheld by the South Korean Constitutional Court that led to his removal from office on 4 April 2025, and for Peruvian President and host, Dina Boluarte after she was impeached and removed from office by the Peruvian Congress on 10 October 2025.

On the other hand, this was the only APEC meeting for Thai Prime Minister Paetongtarn Shinawatra, who assumed the premiership on 16 August, as well as for Japanese Prime Minister Shigeru Ishiba, who assumed the premiership on 1 October. Both Shinawatra and Ishiba stepped down from their respective posts the following year, as the Thai Constitutional Court upheld the verdict of Shinawatra's removal from office on 29 August 2025, while Ishiba resigned a few days later on 7 September 2025 to avoid a rift in the ruling Liberal Democratic Party.

Mexican President Claudia Sheinbaum, Papua New Guinean Prime Minister James Marape and Philippine President Bongbong Marcos announced that they would not attend APEC Peru 2024 meeting, which would have been the first in-person APEC meeting for Sheinbaum; while on the other hand, Marcos cited the recent typhoons affecting the Philippines as a reason of his absence to the summit. Instead, Sheinbaum, Marape and Marcos have designated Mexican Economic Secretary Marcelo Ebrard, Papua New Guinean Deputy Prime Minister John Rosso and then-acting Philippine Trade and Industry Secretary Cristina Aldeguer-Roque as their respective representatives to the summit. Meanwhile, Russian President Vladimir Putin did not attend the summit because Peru is a member of the International Criminal Court, which has issued an arrest warrant against Putin for his war crimes relating on the Russian invasion of Ukraine, and hence it is highly likely that the Peruvian Ministry of Justice would implement the warrant to arrest the Russian president; with Deputy Prime Minister Alexey Overchuk designated to serve as Putin's representative to the summit, instead.

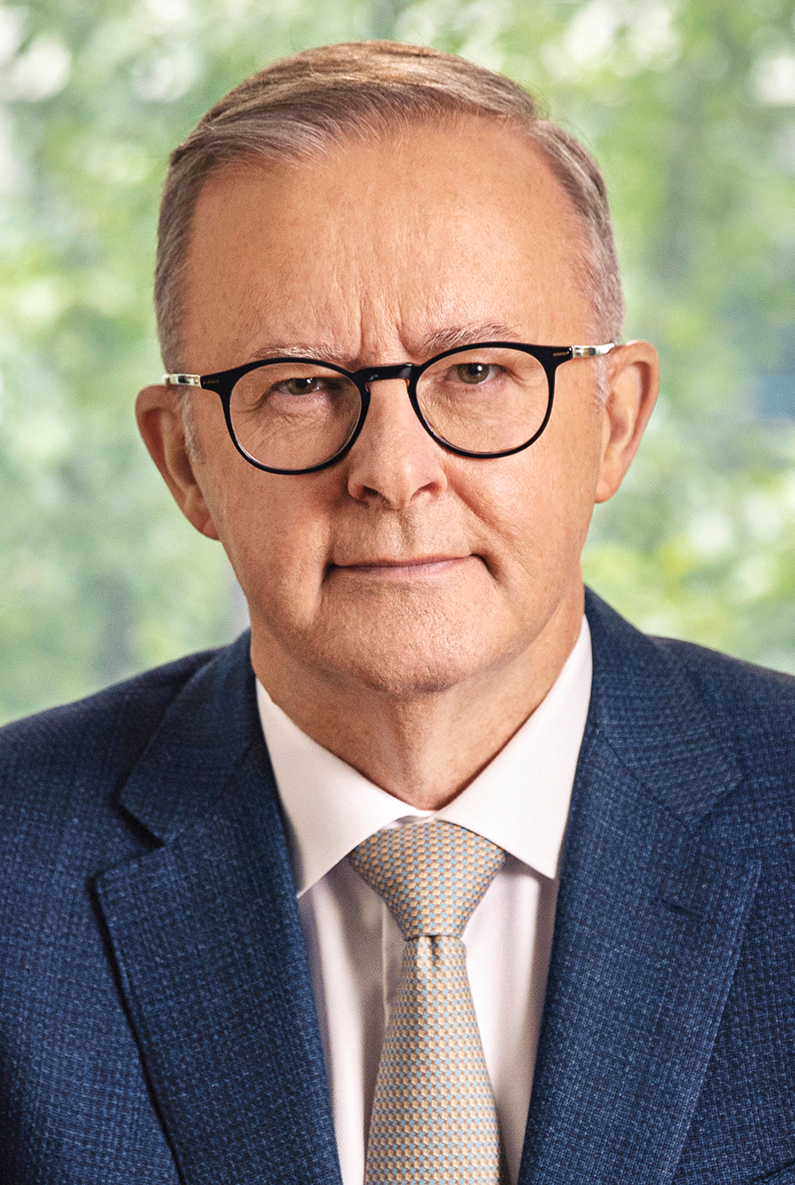
Australia
Anthony Albanese,
Prime Minister

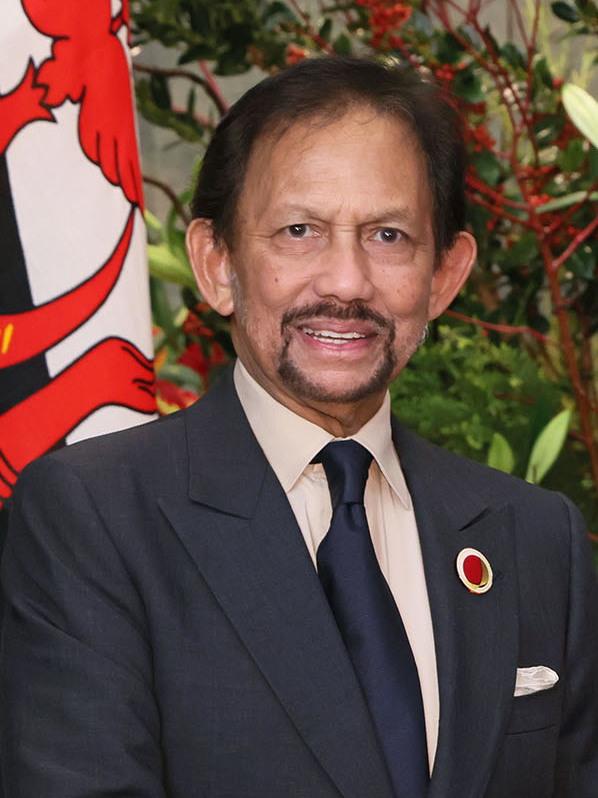
Brunei
Hassanal Bolkiah,
Sultan

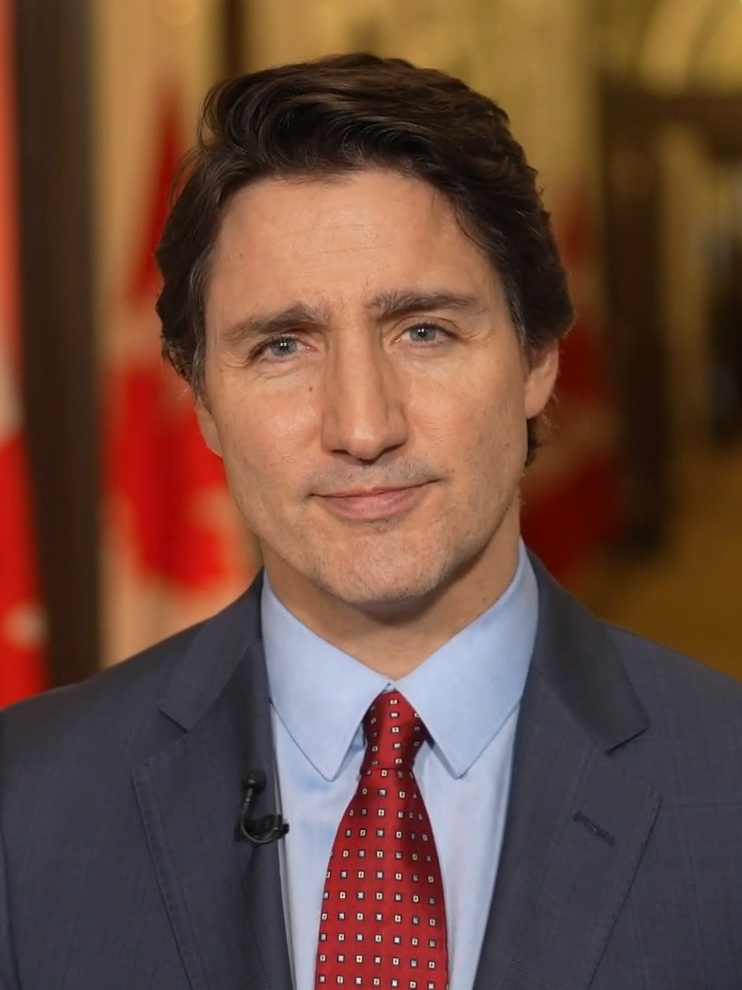
Canada
Justin Trudeau,
Prime Minister

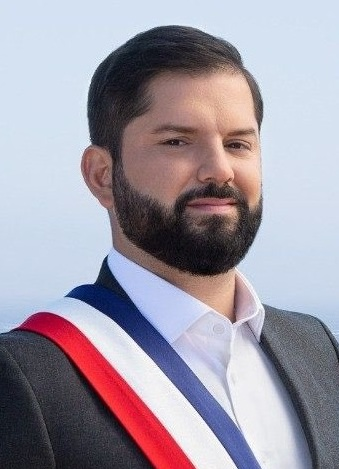
Chile
Gabriel Boric,
President

China
Xi Jinping,
CCP General Secretary and President (Note: The president of China is legally a ceremonial office, but the general secretary of the Chinese Communist Party (de facto leader in one-party communist state) has always held this office since 1993 except for the months of transition.)

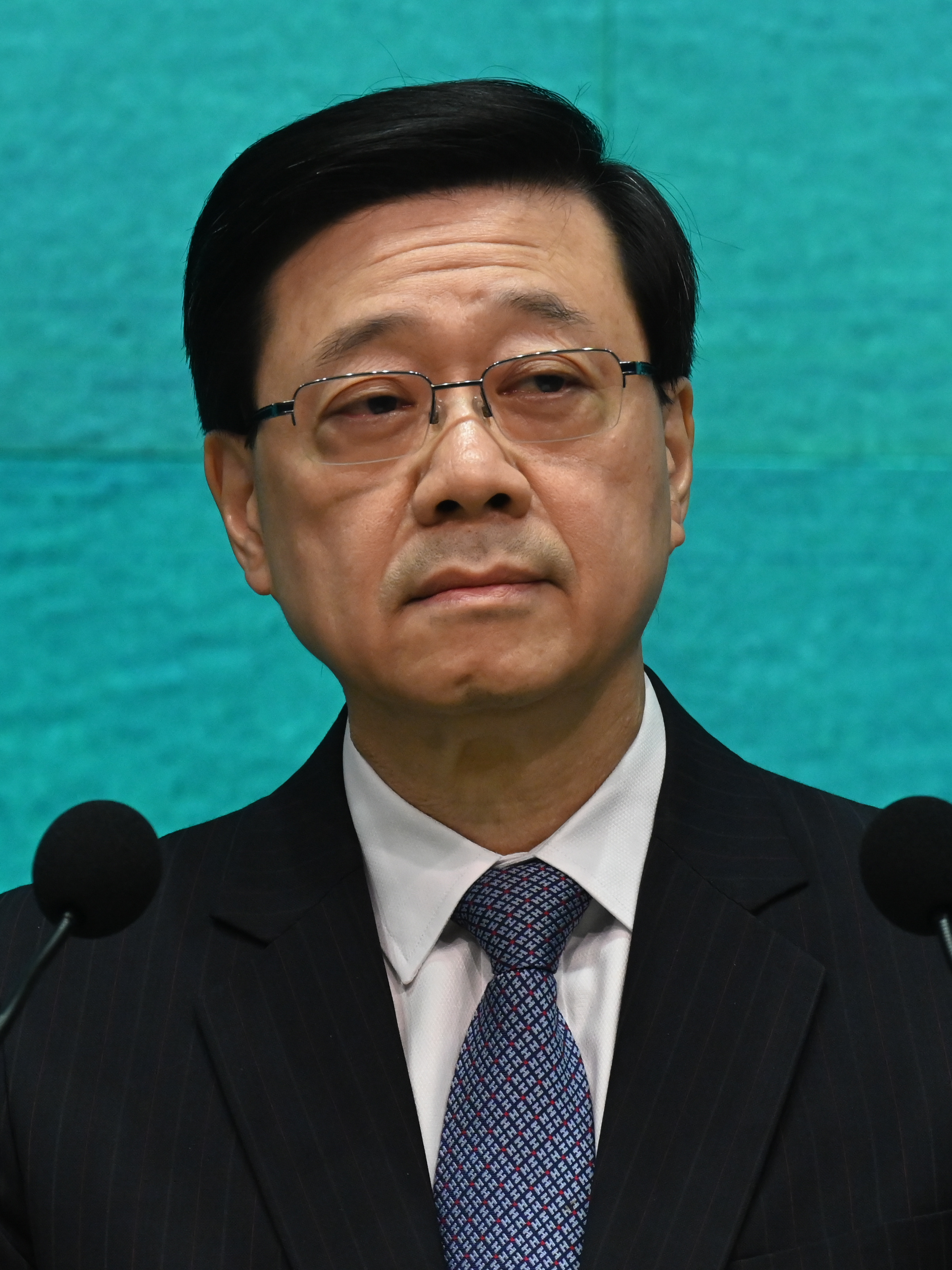
Hong Kong
John Lee,
Chief Executive

Indonesia
Prabowo Subianto,
President

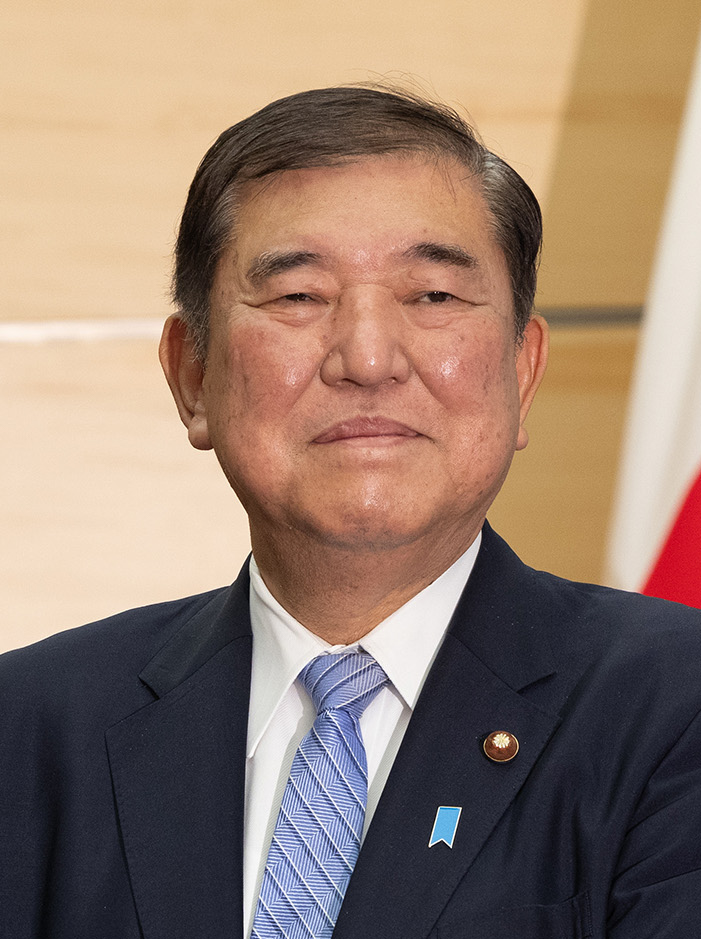
Japan
Shigeru Ishiba,
Prime Minister

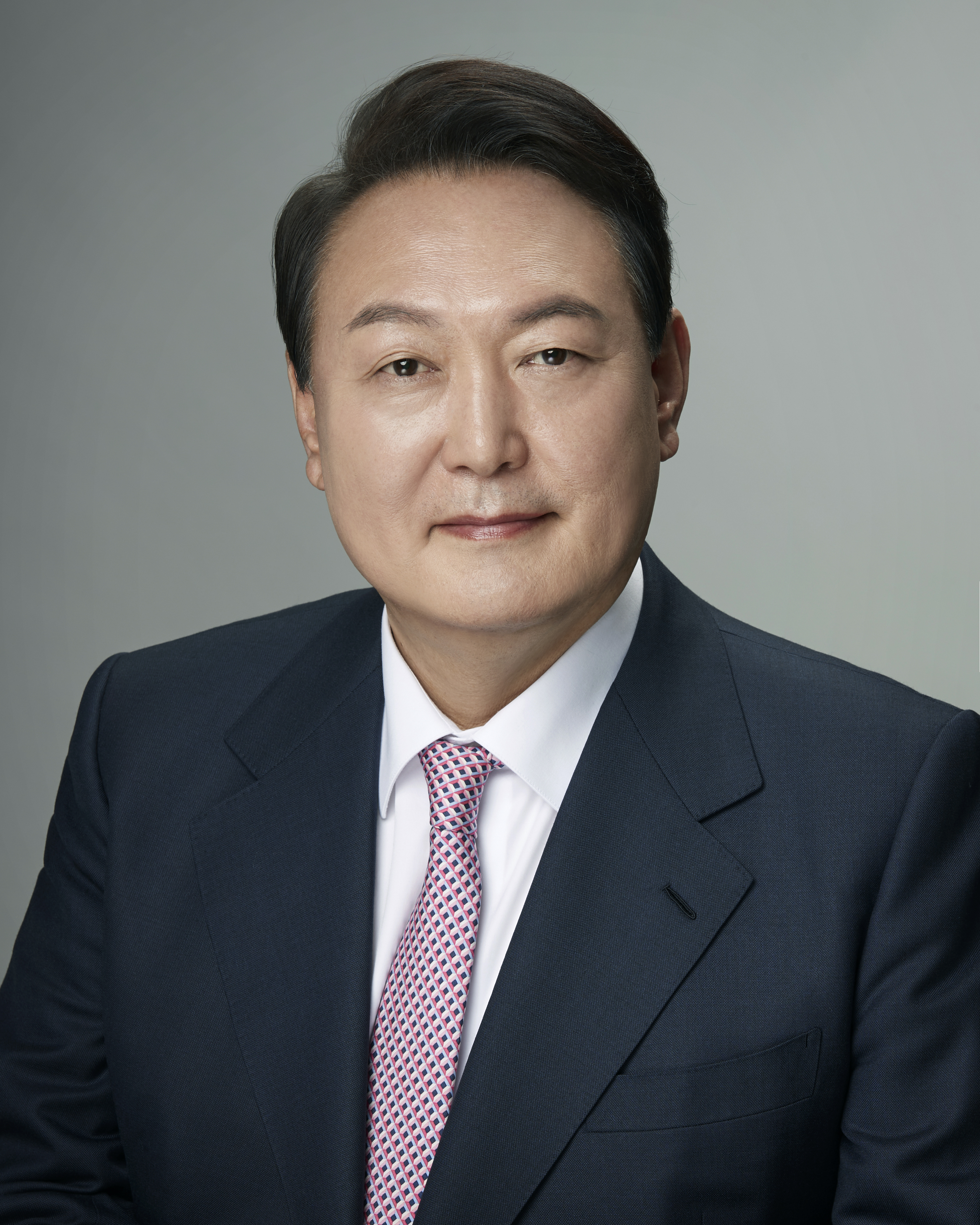
South Korea
Yoon Suk Yeol,
President

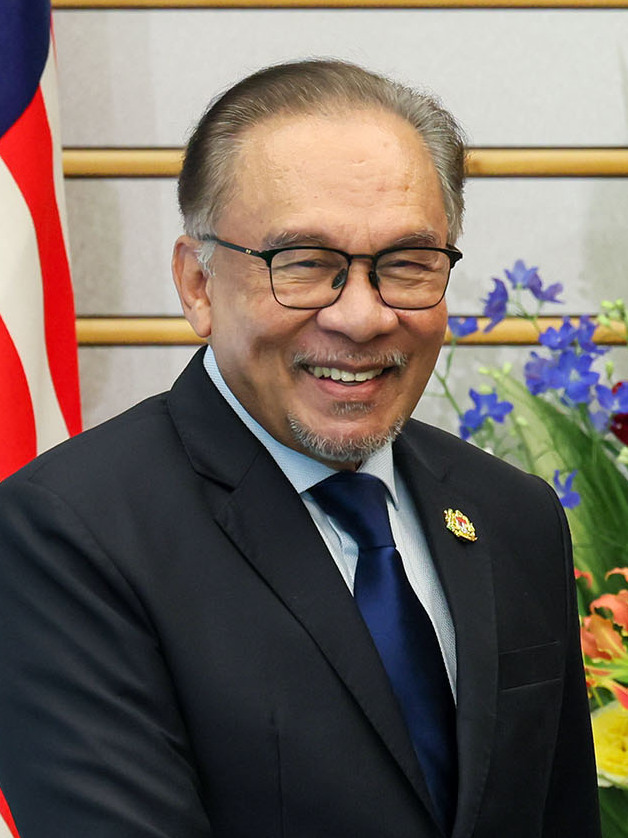
Malaysia
Anwar Ibrahim,
Prime Minister

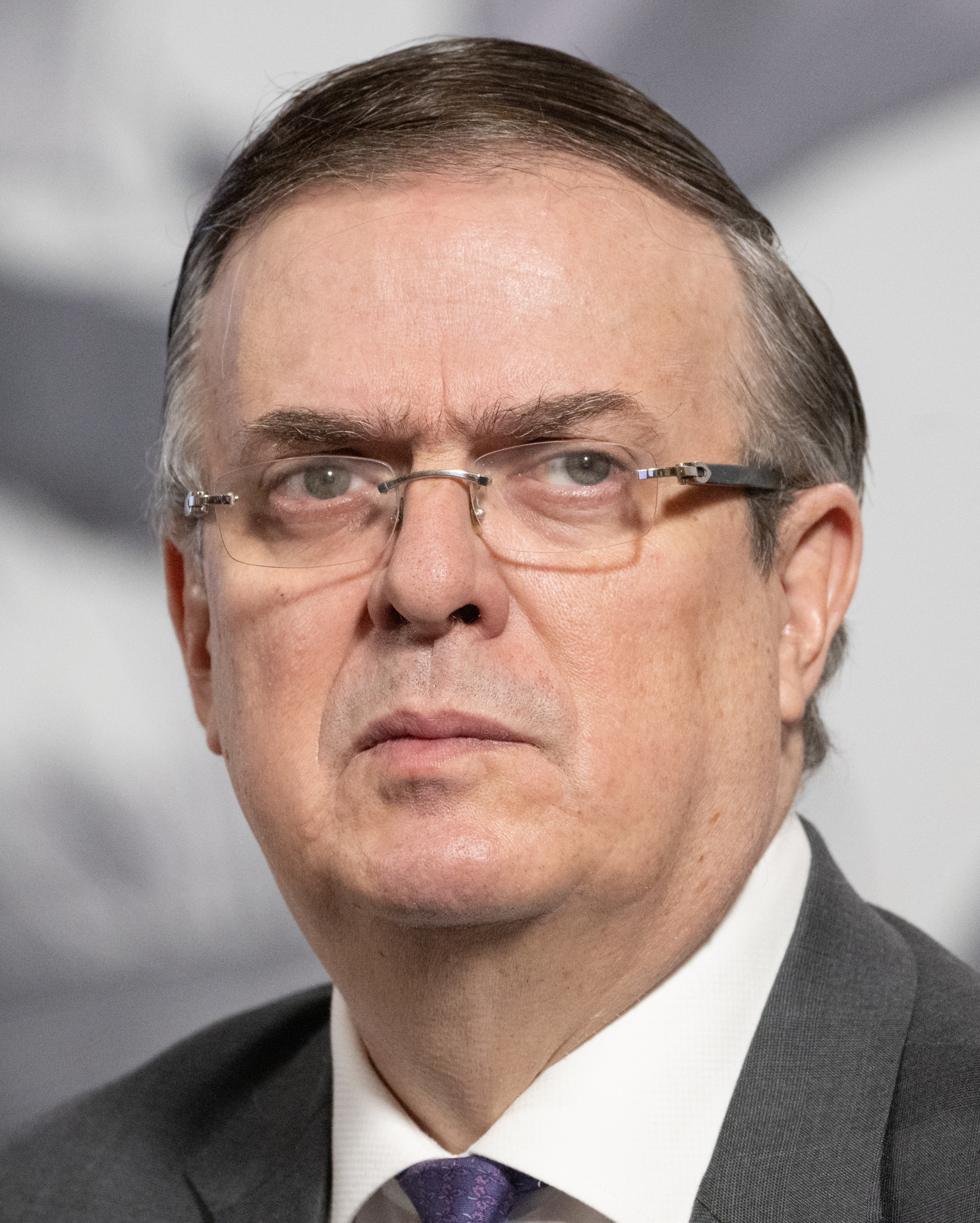
Mexico
Marcelo Ebrard,
Secretary of Economy

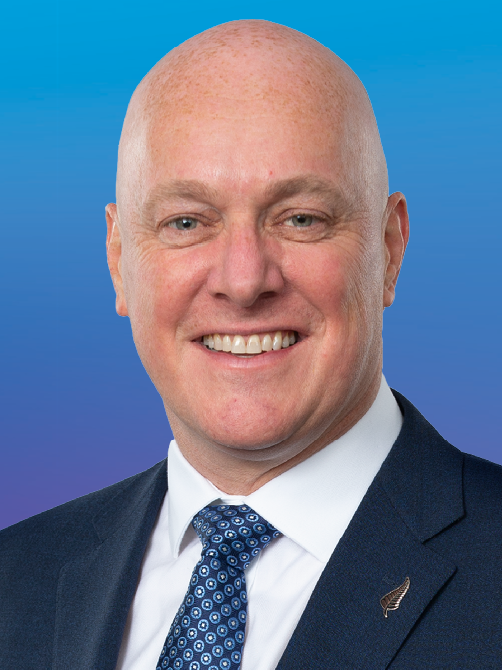
New Zealand
Christopher Luxon,
Prime Minister

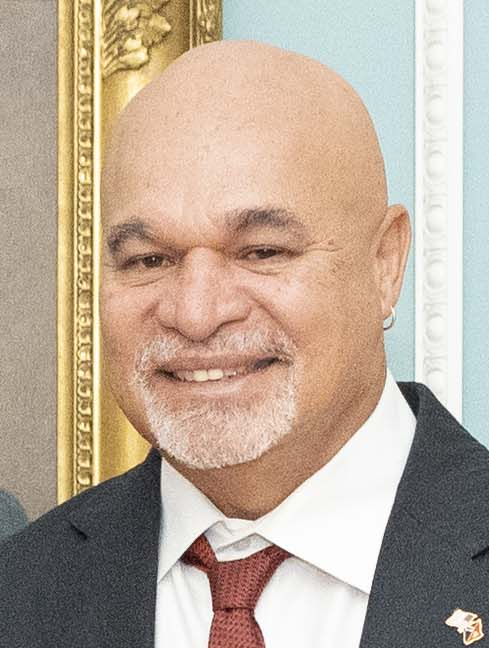
Papua New Guinea
John Rosso,
Deputy Prime Minister

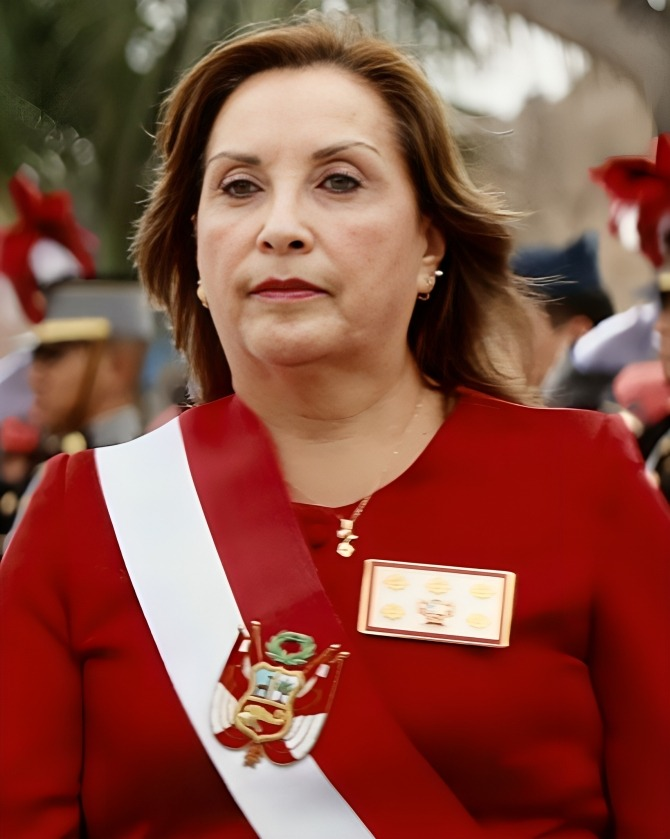
Peru
Dina Boluarte,
President (Host)

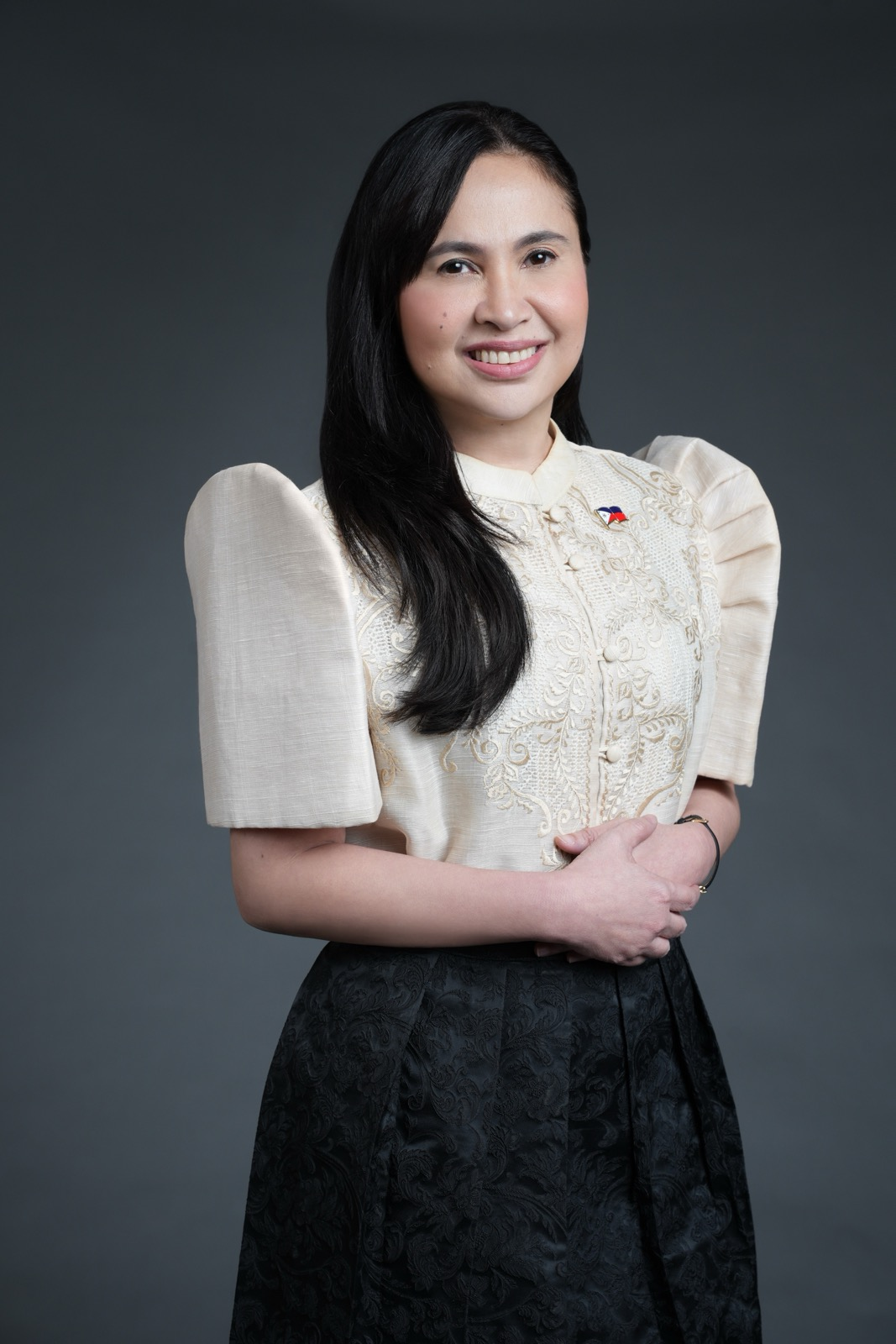
Philippines
Cristina Aldeguer-Roque,
Secretary of Trade and Industry (acting)

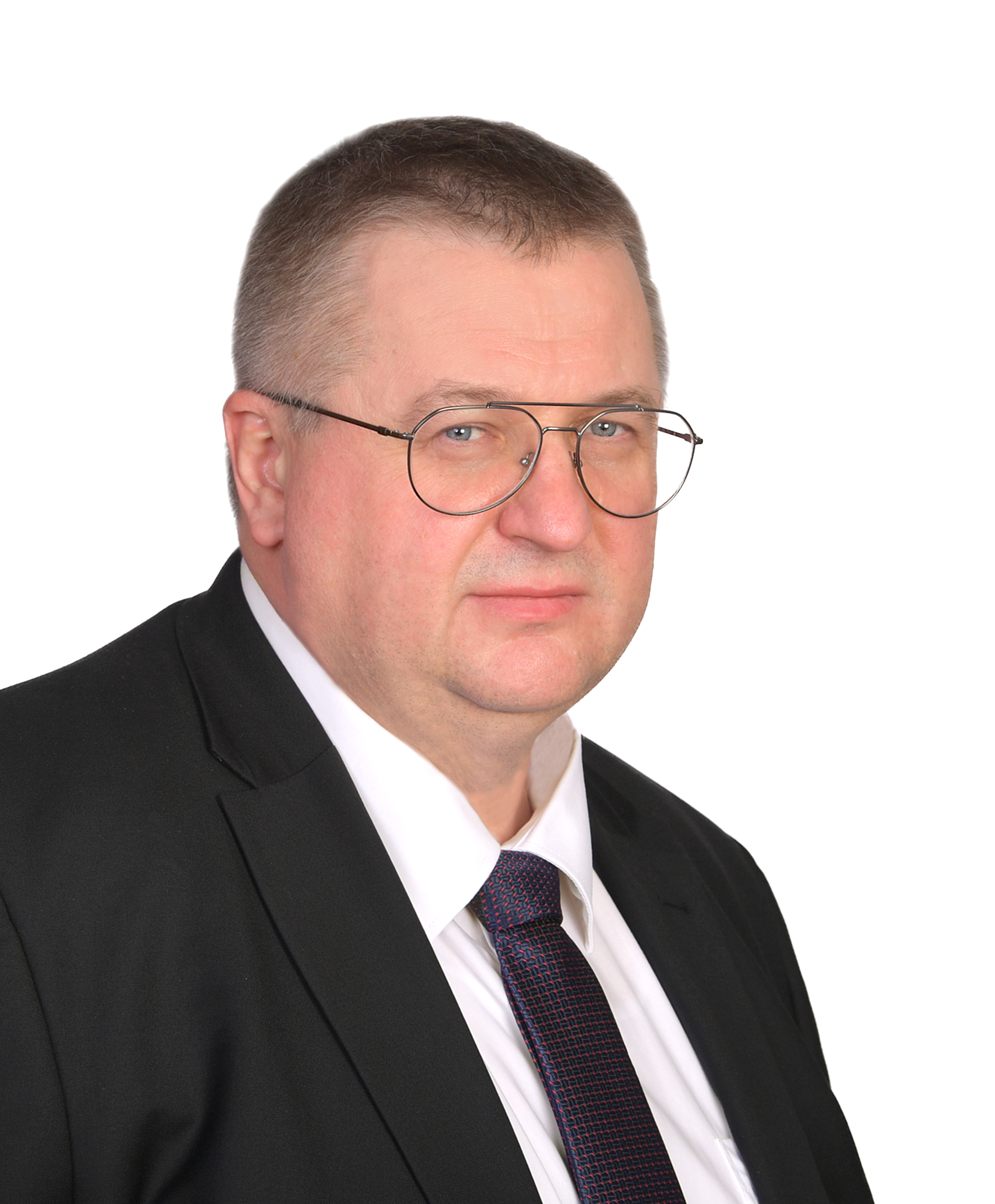
Russia
Alexey Overchuk,
Deputy Prime Minister

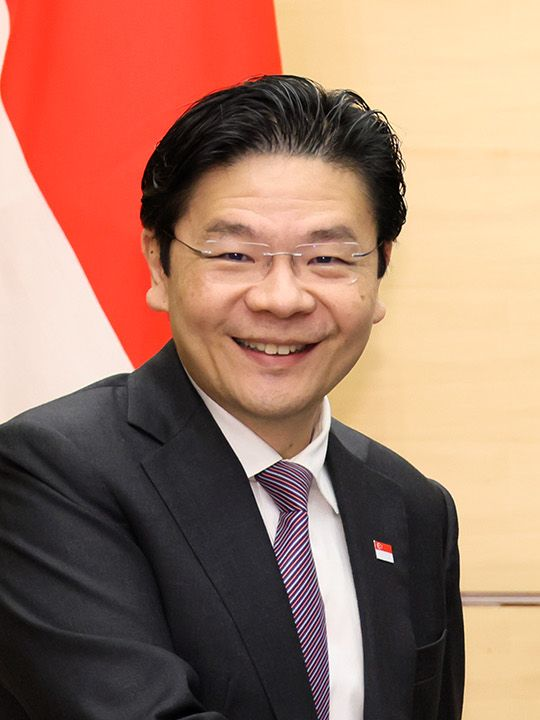
Singapore
Lawrence Wong,
Prime Minister

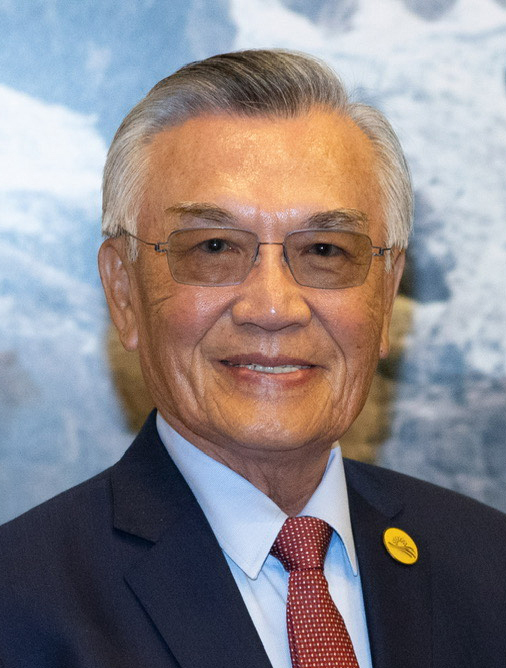
Taiwan
Lin Hsin-i,
Special Representative of Leader (Note: Due to the complexities of the relations between it and the People's Republic of China, the Republic of China (ROC or "Taiwan") was not represented under its official name "Republic of China" or as "Taiwan". Instead, it participates in APEC under the name "Chinese Taipei". The president of the Republic of China does not attend the annual APEC Economic Leaders' Meeting in person. Instead, it was generally represented by a ministerial-level official responsible for economic affairs or someone designated by the president. See List of Chinese Taipei representatives to APEC.)
(representing President Lai Ching-te)

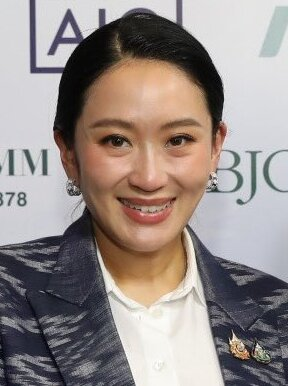
Thailand
Paetongtarn Shinawatra,
Prime Minister

United States
Joe Biden,
President

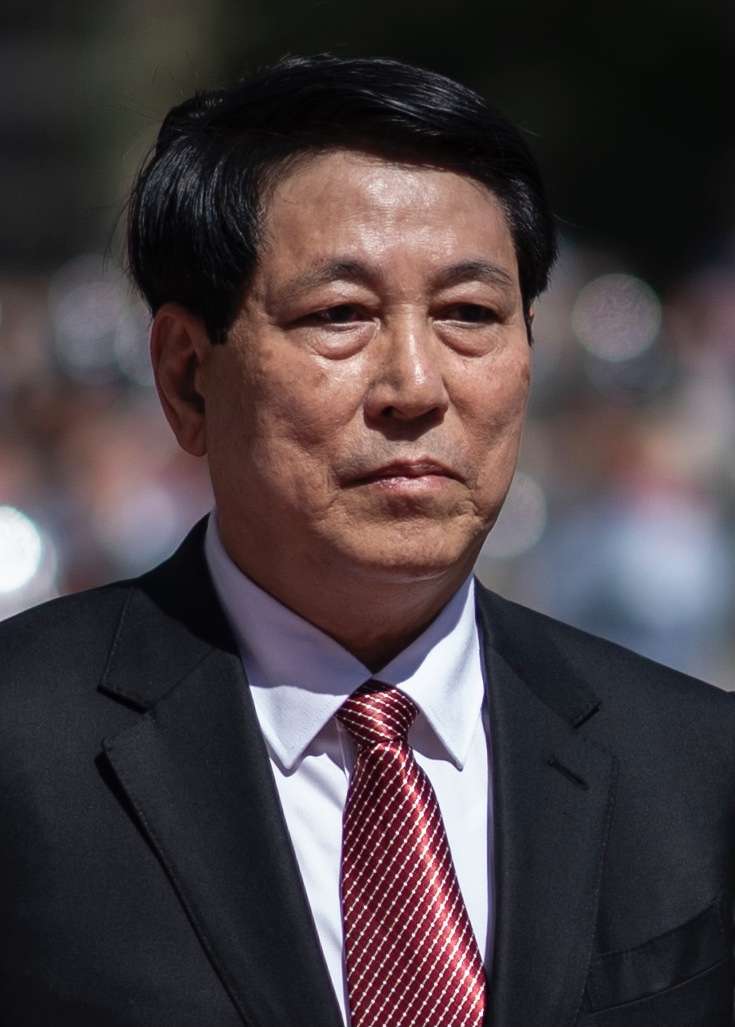
Vietnam
Lương Cường,
President (Note: The actual head of the executive government of Vietnam is the Prime Minister, whose current holder is Phạm Minh Chính. The President is legally the head of state, but the General Secretary of the Communist Party of Vietnam (practical highest political leader in one-party communist state) is being Tô Lâm.)

== Notes ==
Preceded by APEC United States 2023	APEC meetings 2024	Succeeded by APEC South Korea 2025
