= Gyeongju Hwabaek International Convention Center =

Convention center in Gyeongju, South Korea

- 경주화백컨벤션센터
- Interactive map of the Gyeongju Hwabaek International Convention Center area

General information
- Location: 507 Bomun-ro, Gyeongju-si, Gyeongsangbuk-do, Gyeongju, North Gyeongsang Province, South Korea
- Coordinates: 35.8383°N 129.2879°E
- Construction started: 5 December 2012; 13 years ago
- Completed: 12 February 2015; 11 years ago
- Opened: 12 March 2015; 11 years ago

Technical details
- Floor count: 5

Design and construction
- Main contractor: Kyeryong Construction Industrial

Gyeongju Hwabaek Convention Center (Korean: 경주화백컨벤션센터), commonly known as HICO (하이코), is a convention center located in Bomun Tourist Complex in Gyeongju, South Korea.

== Construction ==
Korea Hydro & Nuclear Power invested 120 billion won to support Gyeongju in hosting a radioactive waste disposal facility, and construction began in September 2012. The exterior was inspired by a Silla pavilion, and features an outdoor pond shaped like Donggung Palace and Wolji Pond.

=== Expansion ===
In May 2019, North Gyeongsang Province presided over the Urban Planning Committee and conditionally approved an amendment to the urban management plan designating the center as a minimum site restriction zone for expansion. In July 2021, the city invested 29.5 billion won to expand the exhibition hall by 4,000 m^{2} (43,056 sq ft), the underground parking lot by 2,000 m^{2} (21,528 sq ft), and other convenience facilities by 2,745 m^{2} (29,547 sq ft).

== Facilities ==
It has a site area of 42,774 m^{2} (460,400 sq ft), a total floor area of 41,336 m^{2} (444,900 sq ft), in one underground floor and four above-ground floors. It has a conference room that seats 3,500, 12 medium and small conference rooms, an indoor/outdoor exhibition hall of 6,273 m^{2} (67,500 sq ft), and convenience facilities. The maximum number of people who can be accommodated at the same time is 4,300. In December 2022, the Ministry of Culture, Sports and Tourism additionally designated 1,780,000 m^{2} (19,159,800 sq ft) of the center and Bomun Tourist Complex as an international conference complex.
