= John Rosso =

Papua New Guinea politician

The Honourable John Rosso MP
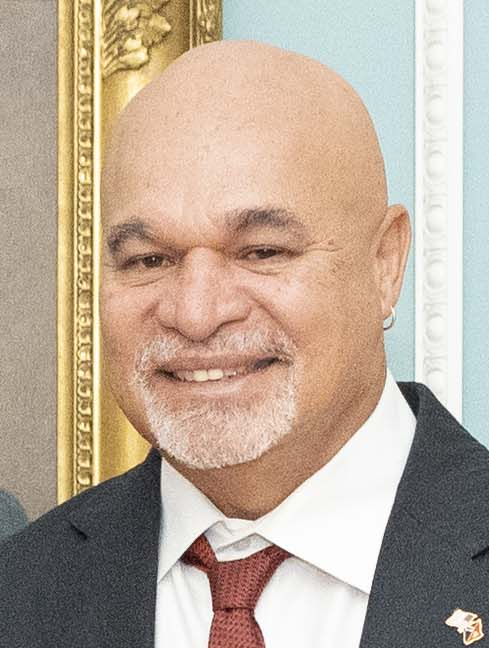
- Rosso in 2024

Deputy Prime Minister of Papua New Guinea
- Incumbent
- Assumed office 25 May 2022
- Prime Minister: James Marape
- Preceded by: Sam Basil

Minister for Lands and Physical Planning
- Incumbent
- Assumed office 7 June 2019
- Prime Minister: James Marape
- Preceded by: Justin Tkatchenko

Member of the National Parliament of Papua New Guinea
- Incumbent
- Assumed office August 2017
- Preceded by: Loujaya Kouza
- Constituency: Lae Open

Personal details
- Party: Pangu Party
- Profession: Business

John Rosso is a Papua New Guinea politician and Member of the 10th Parliament of Papua New Guinea. He is also a businessman and owns two companies based in Lae. Elected as an independent, he joined the Pangu Party shortly after the election. He is currently Minister for Lands and Physical Planning in the Marape-Rosso Government.

== Career ==
Rosso has been active in private enterprise and is the owner of FTM Construction and ESS Security Systems.

Rosso was first elected to the Lae Open seat in the 2017 General Elections as an independent candidate. He subsequently joined Pangu Party (Pangu Pati). He was appointed Minister for Lands & Physical Planning in the government of James Marape and was sworn in to office on 7 June 2019.
