= Alexey Overchuk =

Russian politician

- Алексей Оверчук
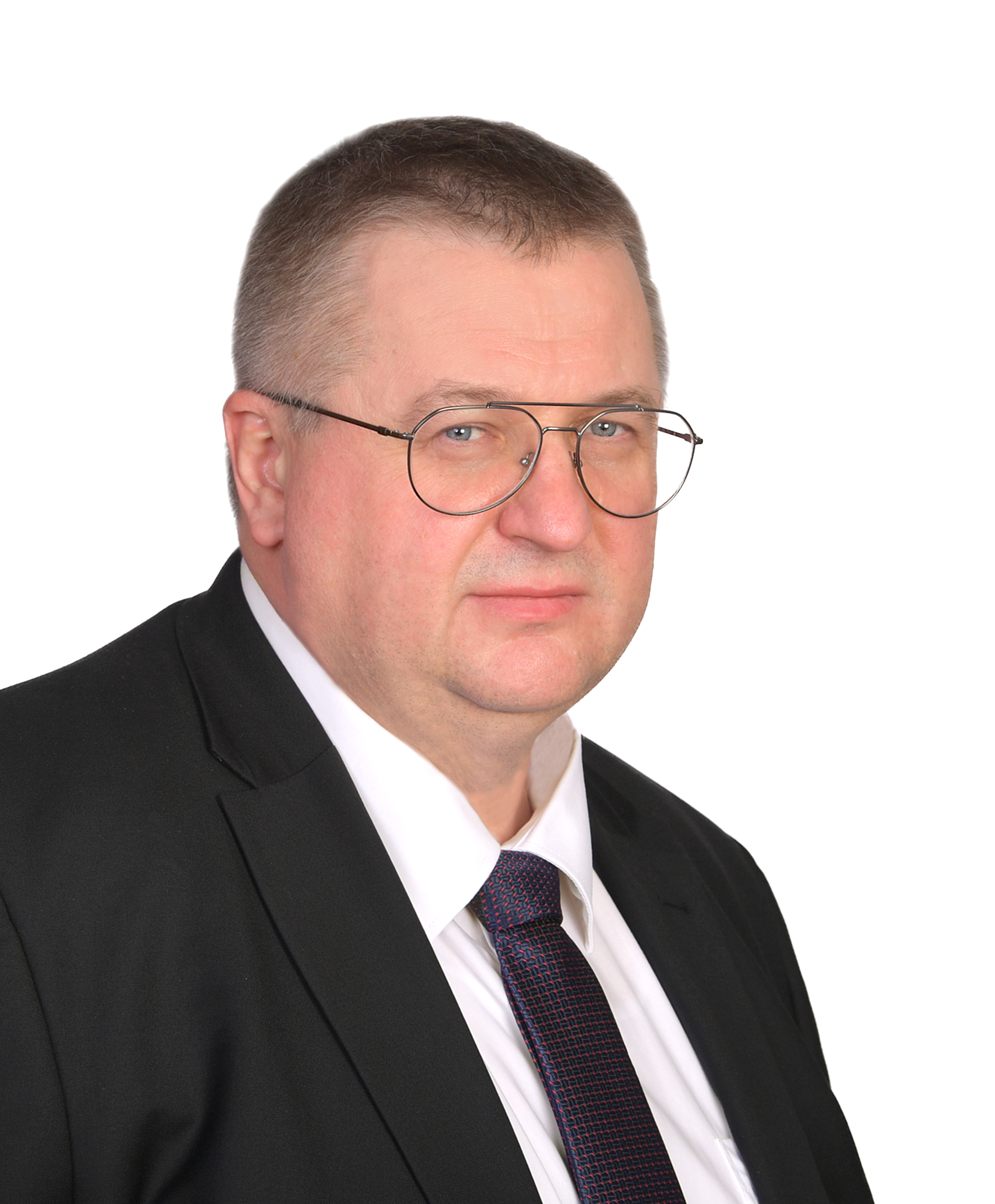
- Official portrait, 2020

Deputy Prime Minister of Russia for Eurasian Integration, cooperation with the CIS, BRICS and G20 and International Events
- Incumbent
- Assumed office 21 January 2020
- Prime Minister: Mikhail Mishustin

Personal details
- Born: 9 December 1964 (age 61) Korostyshiv, Ukrainian SSR, Soviet Union (now Ukraine)
- Party: Independent

Alexey Logvinovich Overchuk (Note: Russian: Алексе́й Лóгвинович Оверчу́к Ukrainian: Олексій Логвинович Оверчук, romanized: Oleksiy Lohvynovych Overchuk) (born 9 December 1964) is a Russian politician serving as Deputy Prime Minister of Russia for Eurasian integration, cooperation with the Commonwealth of Independent States, BRICS, G20, and international events since 21 January 2020.

== Early life and career ==
Alexey Overchuk was born on 9 December 1964 in Korostyshiv, Zhytomyr Oblast, in what is now Ukraine. In 1986, he graduated from the K.A. Timiryazev Moscow Agricultural Academy, specialising in economic cybernetics. In 1992, he defended his PhD thesis on "Organisation of management of cooperative form of farming in industrial agriculture" at the K.A. Timiryazev Moscow Academy of Agriculture, PhD in Economics.

From 1994 to 1998, he was deputy head of the international department of the presidential administration.

== Cadastral and economic career ==
Since 1998, head of the department of state registration of real estate rights at the State Committee for Land Resources and Land Management (Roskomzem).

From August 2000, he was Deputy Head of the Russian Federal Land Cadastre Service (Roszemkadastr), which was reorganised into the Federal Service for State Registration, Cadastre and Cartography in 2004.

In 2007, he became deputy head of the Federal Agency for Management of Special Economic Zones under Mikhail Mishustin, coordinating work to attract investors. Since March 2011 he has been deputy head of the Federal Tax Service. He coordinated and supervised the activities of the Department of Standards and International Cooperation.

== Deputy Prime Minister ==
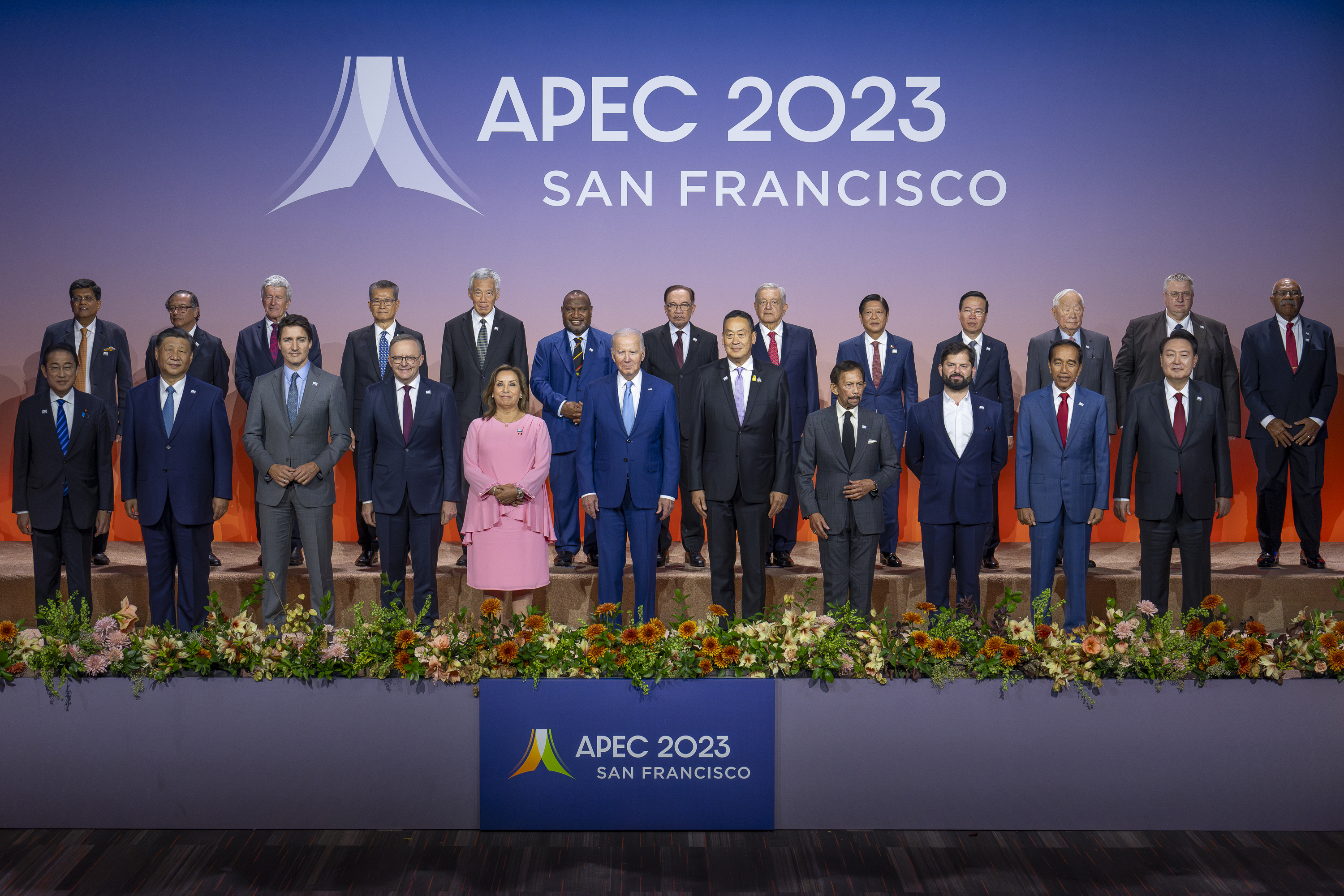
Overchuk participating in a group photo at the APEC Summit in San Francisco, 16 November 2023

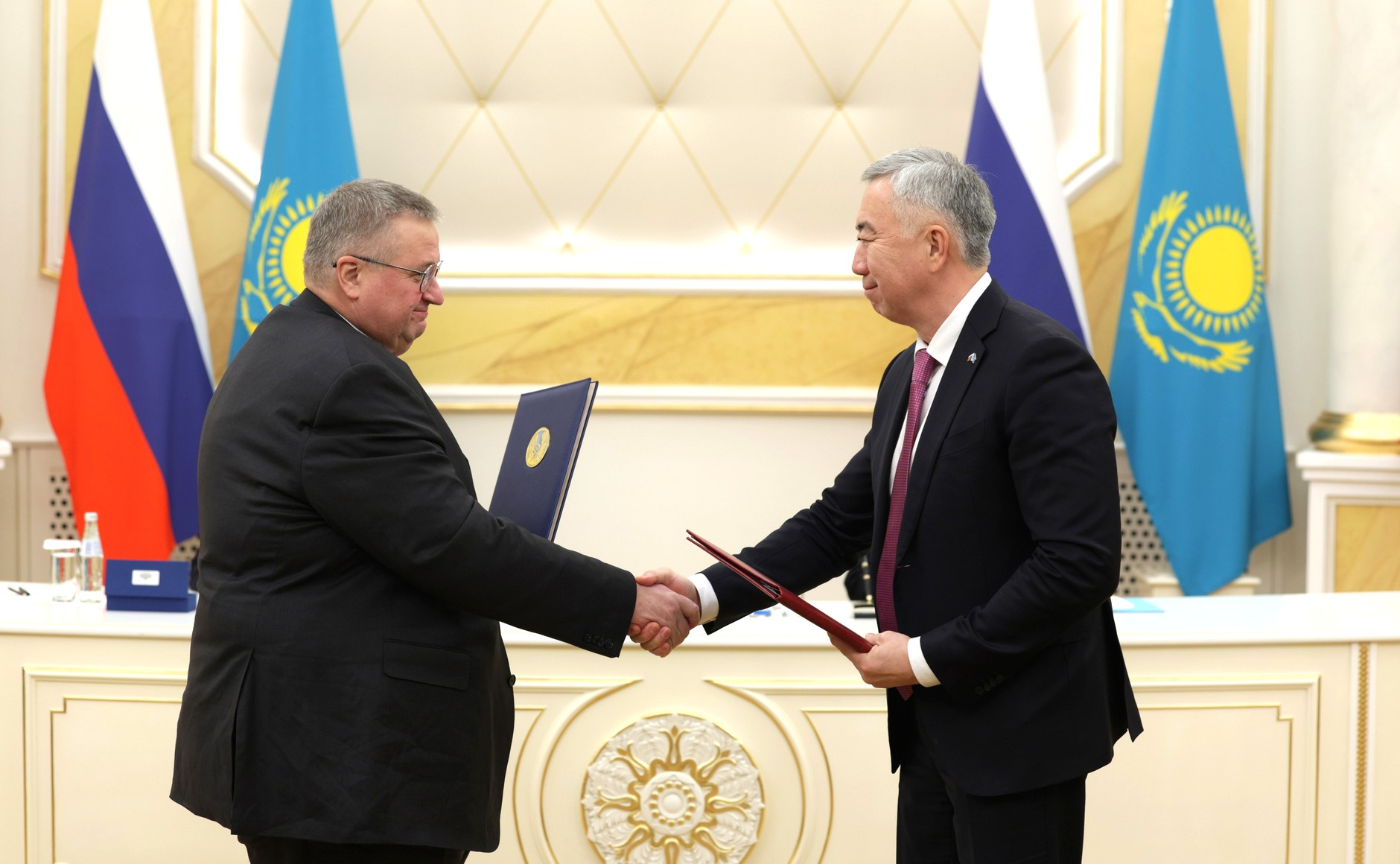
Overchuk with Kazakh Deputy Prime Minister Serik Jumanğarin in Astana, Kazakhstan, 27 November 2024

Since 21 January 2020, he has been Deputy Prime Minister of Russia. Originally, Overchuk was intended to oversee IT issues, but these were distributed among other deputy prime ministers. His responsibilities in government include Eurasian integration, cooperation with international organisations (CIS, BRICS, G20, etc.) and planning and organising international events with the Prime Minister.

He has been placed on the sanctions list of the European Union in December 2022 in relation to the Russian invasion of Ukraine.

== Family ==
His father, Logvin Alekseevich Overchuk, was born on 7 November 1932. He worked at the All-Russian Research Institute of Agricultural Economics and served as an agricultural attaché at the Embassy of the Russian Federation in the United States. He died on 25 June 2007, and was buried at the Troyekurovskoye Cemetery in Moscow.

His mother, Nelli Alexandrovna Overchuk, was born in April 1936. She worked at the All-Russian Research Institute for Technical and Economic Studies of the Agro-Industrial Complex (VNIITEIagroprom). She died on 18 May 2009.
