= APCC =

APCC may refer to:

- American Potash and Chemical Company, American chemical manufacturer
- Anaphase-promoting complex (sometimes abbreviated as APC/C), an enzyme that regulates the spindle checkpoint
- APCC, former Nasdaq symbol for APC by Schneider Electric, an American manufacturer
- APEC Climate Center, the Climate Centre for the Asia-Pacific Economic Cooperation
- Asia Pop Comic Convention, an annual comic book fan convention in Metro Manila, Philippines
- Asian and Pacific Coconut Community, an intergovernmental organization of coconut-producing nations
- Andhra Pradesh Congress Committee, a branch of the Indian National Congress political party in Andhra Pradesh, India
- Arunachal Pradesh Congress Committee, a branch of the Indian National Congress political party in Arunachal Pradesh, India
- Assam Pradesh Congress Committee, a branch of the Indian National Congress political party in Assam, India
- Association of Police and Crime Commissioners, a group of elected officials in England and Wales
