= APEC Australia 1989 =

Organization

- Host country: Australia
- Date: 5–7 November
- Venues: Canberra
- Precedes: 1990

APEC Australia 1989 was composed of a series of political meetings held around Australia between the 12 member economies of the Asia-Pacific Economic Cooperation. These meetings were the first of a series of meetings and were held between 5 and 7 November 1989 in Canberra, the capital of Australia.

== Leader ==
Attendees at the 1989 APEC Economic Leaders' Meeting
Member economy	Name as used in APEC	Position	Name
Australia	Australia	Prime Minister	Bob Hawke
Brunei	Brunei Darussalam	Sultan	Hassanal Bolkiah
Canada	Canada	Prime Minister	Brian Mulroney
Indonesia	Indonesia	President	Soeharto
Japan	Japan	Prime Minister	Toshiki Kaifu
South Korea	Republic of Korea	President	Roh Tae-woo
Malaysia	Malaysia	Prime Minister	Mahathir Mohamad
New Zealand	New Zealand	Prime Minister	Geoffrey Palmer
Philippines	Philippines	President	Corazon Aquino
Singapore	Singapore	Prime Minister	Lee Kuan Yew
Thailand	Thailand	Prime Minister	Chatichai Choonhavan
United States	The United States	President	George H. W. Bush

Preceded by First Meeting	APEC meetings 1989	Succeeded by APEC Singapore 1990
