= APEC Singapore 1990 =

APEC annual meeting

APEC Singapore 1990 Second APEC Ministerial Meeting
- Host country: Singapore
- Date: 29–31 July 1990
- Cities: Singapore
- Follows: APEC Australia 1989
- Precedes: APEC South Korea 1991

The APEC Singapore 1990 was the second ministerial meeting of the Asia-Pacific Economic Cooperation (APEC) forum, held in Singapore from 29 to 31 July 1990. Foreign and economic ministers from the forum's 12 founding economies took part, and the meeting was chaired by the Singaporean ministers Wong Kan Seng and Lee Hsien Loong. The ministers adopted a declaration urging the successful conclusion of the Uruguay Round of world trade talks by the end of 1990, endorsed seven work projects, and agreed to seek arrangements for China, Hong Kong and Taiwan to join the forum.

== Background ==
APEC was founded at a meeting of ministers from 12 economies in Canberra on 6–7 November 1989, following a proposal by Australian prime minister Bob Hawke. At that meeting, ministers judged it too early to decide on a formal structure for the forum, and they welcomed Singapore's offer to host the second meeting. They also agreed that future meetings would be held in Singapore in 1990 and in South Korea in 1991, and that at least every second meeting would be held in a member of the Association of Southeast Asian Nations (ASEAN). Before the Singapore meeting, ASEAN economic ministers set out the terms of their participation in the Kuching Consensus, which stated that APEC should not lead to binding directives for any participant. In May 1990, the Chinese and Australian committees of the Pacific Economic Cooperation Conference agreed in principle that the three Chinese economies should be included.

== Preparations ==
At a meeting in Singapore earlier in 1990, senior officials approved a work programme covering seven areas: trade and investment data, trade promotion, investment and technology transfer, human resource development, energy, marine resource conservation and telecommunications. Each project was to be managed by one or more member economies, known as "shepherds". The Trade Development Board provided staff to host the delegations.

== Participants ==
The meeting brought together ministers from the 12 founding economies of APEC. About 25 foreign and trade ministers attended. The ASEAN Secretariat, the Pacific Economic Cooperation Conference and the South Pacific Forum attended as observers.

- Australia
- Brunei
- Canada
- Indonesia
- Japan
- Malaysia
- New Zealand
- Philippines
- South Korea
- Singapore (Host)
- Thailand
- United States

The host, Singapore, was represented by the foreign minister Wong Kan Seng and the trade and industry minister Lee Hsien Loong, who jointly chaired the meeting. Japan was represented by the foreign minister Taro Nakayama and the minister of international trade and industry Kabun Muto. The United States delegation was led by the secretary of state James Baker. South Korea was represented by the foreign minister Choi Ho-joong, and Malaysia by the trade and industry minister Rafidah Aziz.

== The meeting ==
=== 30 July ===
Singaporean prime minister Lee Kuan Yew gave the keynote address. He argued that APEC could contribute to world growth by supporting free trade, and he warned against a division of the world economy into blocs along racial lines. He urged APEC members to be "good GATT abiding citizens of the world". Baker missed much of the first day because of a fever.

On the first day, the ministers adopted the APEC Declaration on the Uruguay Round, which described the conclusion of the round as "the single most important issue on the international agenda". The declaration expressed concern at the lack of progress, called for major results by December 1990 in agriculture, textiles and clothing, services and market access, and stressed the need for a more effective GATT dispute settlement system.

=== 31 July ===
Baker rejoined the meeting on 31 July and held a private meeting with Choi Ho-joong before the session. He announced a US plan for an education partnership among APEC members, which would link universities and widen internships. The ministers agreed that senior officials would study ways to reduce trade barriers among members, while stressing that the grouping would not become a trading bloc. Lee Hsien Loong said that APEC would approach problems cautiously because its members had widely different interests. Rafidah said that Malaysia had no objection to the inclusion of China, Taiwan and Hong Kong.

== Outcomes ==
=== Joint statement ===
The joint statement said that the primary objective of APEC in 1990 was the successful conclusion of the Uruguay Round. It reaffirmed that APEC was outward-looking and not intended to form a trading bloc, that trade liberalisation should be consistent with GATT principles, and that APEC should complement rather than displace ASEAN. It also welcomed the opening of the economies of Central and Eastern Europe, and expressed the hope that the European Single Market would be outward-looking.

=== Work projects ===
The ministers endorsed seven work projects: a review of trade and investment data, trade promotion, investment and technology transfer, human resource development, regional energy cooperation, marine resource conservation and telecommunications. They also asked senior officials to assess possible new projects in transport, tourism and fisheries.

=== China, Hong Kong and Taiwan ===
The ministers acknowledged the important role of China, Taiwan and Hong Kong in the region and agreed that their participation in future meetings was desirable. Consultations were to seek arrangements acceptable to the three economies and to the existing members, with the aim of having all three join at the same time, at the Seoul meeting or soon afterwards. South Korea, as the next chair, was entrusted with the consultations. All three economies joined APEC at the Seoul meeting in November 1991.

=== Future meetings ===
The ministers agreed to hold the third meeting in Seoul in 1991, the fourth in Thailand in 1992 and the fifth in the United States in 1993. APEC trade ministers were to meet in Vancouver on 11–12 September 1990 to review the Uruguay Round, and a special meeting of trade ministers was to follow its conclusion.

== See also ==
- Uruguay Round

Preceded by Australia 1989	APEC meetings 1990	Succeeded by South Korea 1991
