= Asia-Pacific Economic Cooperation =

Economic forum of Asia–Pacific nations

- Member economies of APEC
- Headquarters: Singapore
- Type: Economic meeting
- Membership: 21 economies: Australia; Brunei; Canada; Chile; China; Hong Kong; Indonesia; Japan; Malaysia; Mexico; New Zealand; Papua New Guinea; Peru; Philippines; Russia; Singapore; South Korea; Taiwan (Note: Due to the complexities of the relations between it and Communist China (officially the People's Republic of China), the Republic of China (ROC or "Taiwan"; retroactively known as Nationalist China) is not represented under its official various names such as the "Republic of China", "Nationalist China" or "Taiwan". Instead, it participates in APEC under the name "Chinese Taipei". The President of the Republic of China cannot attend the annual APEC Economic Leaders' Meeting in person. Instead, it is generally represented by a ministerial-level official responsible for economic affairs or someone designated by the president. See List of Chinese Taipei Representatives to APEC.); Thailand; United States; Vietnam

Leaders
  - Chairman (incumbent): Chinese President Xi Jinping (Note: The de jure head of government of China is the Premier, whose current holder is Li Qiang. The President of China is legally a ceremonial office, but the General Secretary of the Chinese Communist Party (de facto leader in one-party communist state) has always held this office since 1993 except for the months of transition, and the current general secretary is Xi Jinping.)
  - Executive director: Eduardo Pedrosa
- Establishment: 1989; 37 years ago
- Website www.apec.org

The Asia-Pacific Economic Cooperation (APEC /ˈeɪpɛk/ AY-pek) is an inter-governmental forum for 21 member economies in the Pacific Rim which promotes free trade throughout the Asia-Pacific region. Following the success of ASEAN's series of post-ministerial conferences launched in the mid-1980s, APEC started in 1989, in response to the growing interdependence of Asia-Pacific economies and the advent of regional trade blocs in other parts of the world; it aimed to establish new markets for agricultural products and raw materials beyond Europe. Headquartered in Singapore, APEC is recognised as one of the highest-level multilateral blocs and oldest forums in the Asia-Pacific / Americas region, and exerts significant global influence.

The heads of government of all APEC members except Taiwan (which is represented by a ministerial-level official as economic leader) attend an annual APEC Economic Leaders' Meeting. The location of the meeting rotates annually among the member economies, and a famous tradition, followed for most (but not all) summits, involves the attending leaders dressing in a national costume of the host country. APEC has three official observers: the Association of Southeast Asian Nations Secretariat, the Pacific Economic Cooperation Council and the Pacific Islands Forum Secretariat. APEC's Host Economy of the Year is considered to be invited in the first place for geographical representation to attend G20 meetings following G20 guidelines.

== History ==
ABC news report of the first APEC meeting in Canberra, November 1989, featuring delegates watching the Melbourne Cup

The initial inspiration for APEC came when the Association of Southeast Asian Nations (ASEAN)'s series of post-ministerial conferences, launched in the mid-1980s, had demonstrated the feasibility and value of regular conferences among ministerial-level representatives of both developed and developing economies. By 1986, the post-ministerial conferences had expanded to embrace 12 members (the then six members of ASEAN and its six dialogue partners). The developments led Australian Prime Minister Bob Hawke to believe in the necessity of region-wide co-operation on economic matters. In January 1989, Bob Hawke called for more effective economic co-operation across the Pacific Rim region. This led to the first meeting of APEC in the Australian capital of Canberra in November, chaired by Australian Foreign Affairs Minister Gareth Evans. Attended by ministers from twelve countries, the meeting concluded with commitments to hold future annual meetings in Singapore and South Korea. Ten months later, representatives of 12 Asia-Pacific economies met in Canberra, Australia, to establish APEC. The APEC Secretariat, based in Singapore, was established to co-ordinate the activities of the organisation. The organisation was initially an Australian initiative intended to secure greater Japanese engagement in the region, but it quickly evolved into a forum for broader economic cooperation. Its early years were characterised by a dynamic tension between members favouring a structured trade agreement and those, like the United States, who preferred a looser, more consultative approach.

During the 1994 meeting in Bogor, Indonesia, APEC leaders adopted the Bogor Goals, which aimed for free and open trade and investment in the Asia-Pacific by 2010 for industrialised economies and by 2020 for developing economies. During the November 1995 Ministerial Meeting in Osaka, Japan, a business advisory body named the APEC Business Advisory Council (ABAC) composed of three business executives from each member-country was agreed to be established in 1996.

In April 2001, APEC, in collaboration with five other international organisations (Eurostat, International Energy Agency, Organización Latinoamericana de Energía (OLADE), Organization of the Petroleum Exporting Countries and the United Nations Statistics Division) launched the Joint Oil Data Exercise, which in 2005 became the Joint Organisations Data Initiative (JODI).

The Policy Support Unit (PSU) was established by APEC Ministers in September 2007 and commenced operations in 2008 as a research and analysis arm for APEC. As a part of the APEC Secretariat, the PSU is supported by voluntary donations and overseen by a governance board, and to support objective and high-quality research, analytical capacity and policy support capability to the APEC Senior Officials in order to promote policies that support the achievement of APEC's goals.

=== Meeting locations ===
The location of the annual meeting rotates among the members.

APEC ministers' meeting
Year	#	Dates	Country	City	Host leader
1989	1st	6–7 November	Australia	Canberra	Prime Minister Bob Hawke
1990	2nd	29–31 July	Singapore	Singapore	Prime Minister Lee Kuan Yew
1991	3rd	12–14 November	South Korea	Seoul	President Roh Tae-woo
1992	4th	10–11 September	Thailand	Bangkok	Prime Minister Anand Panyarachun

APEC economic leaders' meeting
Year	#	Dates	Country	City	Host leader
1993	1st	19–20 November	United States	Blake Island (Seattle)	President Bill Clinton
1994	2nd	15–16 November	Indonesia	Bogor	President Suharto
1995	3rd	18–19 November	Japan	Osaka	Prime Minister Tomiichi Murayama
1996	4th	24–25 November	Philippines	Subic	President Fidel Ramos
1997	5th	24–25 November	Canada	Vancouver	Prime Minister Jean Chrétien
1998	6th	17–18 November	Malaysia	Kuala Lumpur	Prime Minister Mahathir Mohamad
1999	7th	12–13 September	New Zealand	Auckland	Prime Minister Jenny Shipley
2000	8th	15–16 November	Brunei	Bandar Seri Begawan	Sultan Hassanal Bolkiah
2001	9th	20–21 October	China	Shanghai	General Secretary and President Jiang Zemin
2002	10th	26–27 October	Mexico	Los Cabos	President Vicente Fox
2003	11th	20–21 October	Thailand	Bangkok	Prime Minister Thaksin Shinawatra
2004	12th	20–21 November	Chile	Santiago	President Ricardo Lagos
2005	13th	18–19 November	South Korea	Busan	President Roh Moo-hyun
2006	14th	18–19 November	Vietnam	Hanoi	President Nguyễn Minh Triết (Note: The official head of the executive government of Vietnam is the Prime Minister, whose current holder is Lê Minh Hưng. The President of Vietnam is legally the head of state, but the General Secretary of the Communist Party of Vietnam is the practical highest political leader in a one-party communist state. Both seats are currently held by Tô Lâm, as they are sometimes, but not always, held by the same person.)
2007	15th	8–9 September	Australia	Sydney	Prime Minister John Howard
2008	16th	22–23 November	Peru	Lima	President Alan Garcia Perez
2009	17th	14–15 November	Singapore	Singapore	Prime Minister Lee Hsien Loong
2010	18th	13–14 November	Japan	Yokohama	Prime Minister Naoto Kan
2011	19th	12–13 November	United States	Honolulu	President Barack Obama
2012	20th	9–10 September	Russia	Vladivostok	President Vladimir Putin
2013	21st	5–7 October	Indonesia	Bali	President Susilo Bambang Yudhoyono
2014	22nd	10–11 November	China	Beijing	General Secretary and President Xi Jinping
2015	23rd	18–19 November	Philippines	Pasay	President Benigno Aquino III
2016	24th	19–20 November	Peru	Lima	President Pedro Pablo Kuczynski
2017	25th	10–11 November	Vietnam	Da Nang	President Trần Đại Quang
2018	26th	17–18 November	Papua New Guinea	Port Moresby	Prime Minister Peter O'Neill
2019	~~27th~~	16–17 November (cancelled)	Chile	Santiago	President Sebastián Piñera
2020	28th	20 November	Malaysia	Kuala Lumpur (hosted virtually)	Prime Minister Muhyiddin Yassin
2021	–	16 July	New Zealand	Auckland (hosted virtually)	Prime Minister Jacinda Ardern
2021	29th	12 November	New Zealand	Auckland (hosted virtually)	Prime Minister Jacinda Ardern
2022	30th	18–19 November	Thailand	Bangkok	Prime Minister Prayut Chan-o-cha
2023	31st	15–17 November	United States	San Francisco	President Joe Biden
2024	32nd	10–16 November	Peru	Lima	President Dina Boluarte
2025	33rd	31 October – 1 November	South Korea	Gyeongju	President Lee Jae Myung
2026	34th	18–19 November	China	Shenzhen	General Secretary and President Xi Jinping
2027	35th	TBA	Vietnam	Phú Quốc	General Secretary and President Tô Lâm
2028	36th	TBA	Mexico	TBA	President Claudia Sheinbaum
2029	37th	TBA	TBA	TBA	TBA
2030	38th	TBA	Singapore	Singapore	TBA
2031	39th	TBA	Japan	TBA	TBA
2032	40th	TBA	Chile	TBA	TBA
2033	41st	TBA	Papua New Guinea	TBA	TBA
2034	42nd	TBA	Peru	TBA	TBA

== Member economies ==
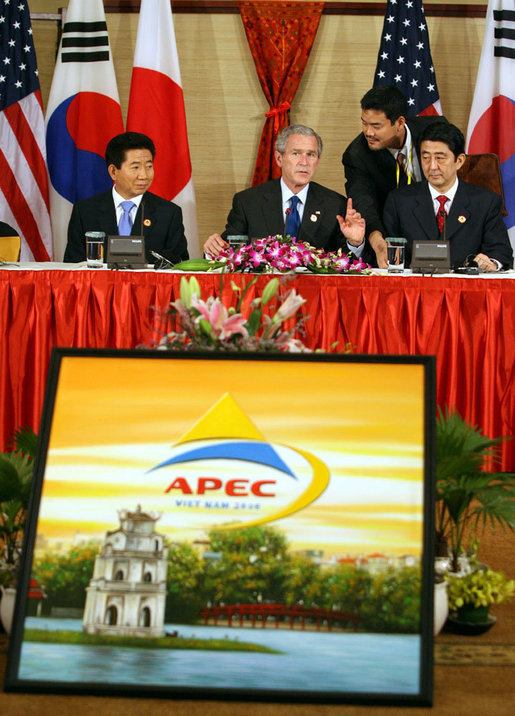
Former South Korean President Roh Moo-hyun with former Japanese Prime Minister Shinzō Abe and Former U.S. President George W. Bush at APEC 2006 in Hanoi, Vietnam

Currently, APEC has 21 members. The criterion for membership, however, is that each member must be an independent economic entity, rather than a sovereign state. As a result, APEC uses the term member economies rather than member countries to refer to its members. One result of this criterion is that membership of the forum includes Taiwan (officially the Republic of China, participating under the name "Chinese Taipei") alongside People's Republic of China (see Cross-Strait relations), as well as Hong Kong, which entered APEC as a British colony but it is now a Special Administrative Region of the People's Republic of China. APEC also includes three official observers: ASEAN, the Pacific Islands Forum and the Pacific Economic Cooperation Council.

Member economy	Name as used in APEC	Date of accession	GDP (nominal) in 2024 (millions of US$)
Australia	Australia	November 1989	1,802,006
Brunei	Brunei Darussalam	November 1989	15,510
Canada	Canada	November 1989	2,214,796
Chile	Chile	November 1994	328,720
China	People's Republic of China	November 1991	18,273,357
Hong Kong	Hong Kong, China (Note: Hong Kong joined APEC in 1991 during British administration with the name "Hong Kong." In 1997, Hong Kong became a Special Administrative Region of the People's Republic of China and took the name "Hong Kong, China.")	November 1991	401,751
Indonesia	Indonesia	November 1989	1,402,590
Japan	Japan	November 1989	4,070,094
Malaysia	Malaysia	November 1989	439,748
Mexico	Mexico	November 1993	1,848,125
New Zealand	New Zealand	November 1989	252,236
Papua New Guinea	Papua New Guinea	November 1993	31,716
Peru	Peru	November 1998	318,480
Philippines	Republic of the Philippines	November 1989	470,062
Russia	Russian Federation	November 1998	2,184,316
Singapore	Singapore	November 1989	530,708
South Korea	Republic of Korea	November 1989	1,869,916
Taiwan	Chinese Taipei	November 1991	775,017
Thailand	Thailand	November 1989	528,919
United States	United States of America	November 1989	29,167,779
Vietnam	Viet Nam	November 1998	468,485

=== Leaders ===
Member	Leader position	Leader (mostly head of government)	Finance portfolio	Portfolio minister
Australia	Prime Minister	Anthony Albanese	Treasurer	Jim Chalmers
Brunei	Sultan; Prime Minister	Hassanal Bolkiah	Minister of Finance and Economy; Second Minister of Finance and Economy	Hassanal Bolkiah; Amin Liew Abdullah
Canada	Prime Minister	Mark Carney	Minister of Finance	François-Philippe Champagne
Chile	President	José Antonio Kast	Minister of Finance	Jorge Quiroz
China	CCP General Secretary; President	Xi Jinping	Minister of Finance	Lan Fo'an
Hong Kong	Chief Executive	John Lee Ka-chiu	Financial Secretary	Paul Chan
Indonesia	President	Prabowo Subianto	Minister of Finance	Suahasil Nazara
Japan	Prime Minister	Sanae Takaichi	Minister of Finance	Satsuki Katayama
South Korea	President	Lee Jae Myung	Minister of Economy and Finance	Lee Hyoung-il
Malaysia	Prime Minister	Anwar Ibrahim	Minister of Finance; Second Minister of Finance	Anwar Ibrahim; Amir Hamzah Azizan
Mexico	President	Claudia Sheinbaum	Secretary of Finance and Public Credit	Edgar Amador Zamora
New Zealand	Prime Minister	Christopher Luxon	Minister of Finance	Nicola Willis
Papua New Guinea	Prime Minister	James Marape	Minister for Finance and Rural Development	Thomas Opa
Peru	President	Keiko Fujimori	Minister of Economy and Finance	Elmer Cuba
Philippines	President	Bongbong Marcos	Secretary of Finance	Frederick Go
Russia	President	Vladimir Putin	Minister of Finance	Anton Siluanov
Singapore	Prime Minister	Lawrence Wong	Minister of Finance	Lawrence Wong
Taiwan	President / Leader Envoy	Lai Ching-te (represented by Stan Shih)	Minister of Finance	Chuang Tsui-yun
Thailand	Prime Minister	Anutin Charnvirakul	Minister of Finance	Ekniti Nitithanprapas
United States	President	Donald Trump	Secretary of the Treasury	Scott Bessent
Vietnam	CPV General Secretary; President	Tô Lâm	Minister of Finance	Ngô Văn Tuấn

==== Current leaders ====
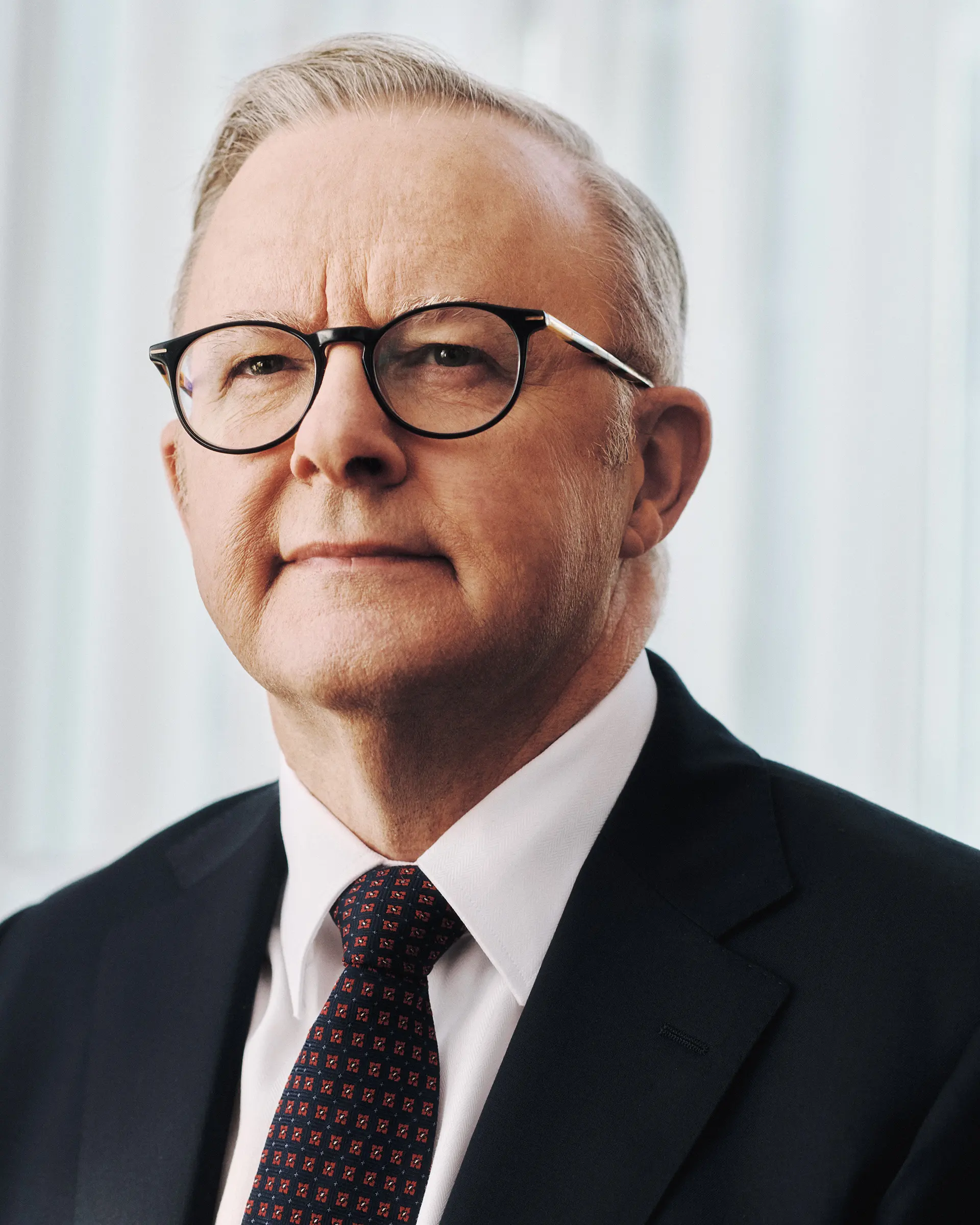
Australia
Anthony Albanese,
Prime Minister

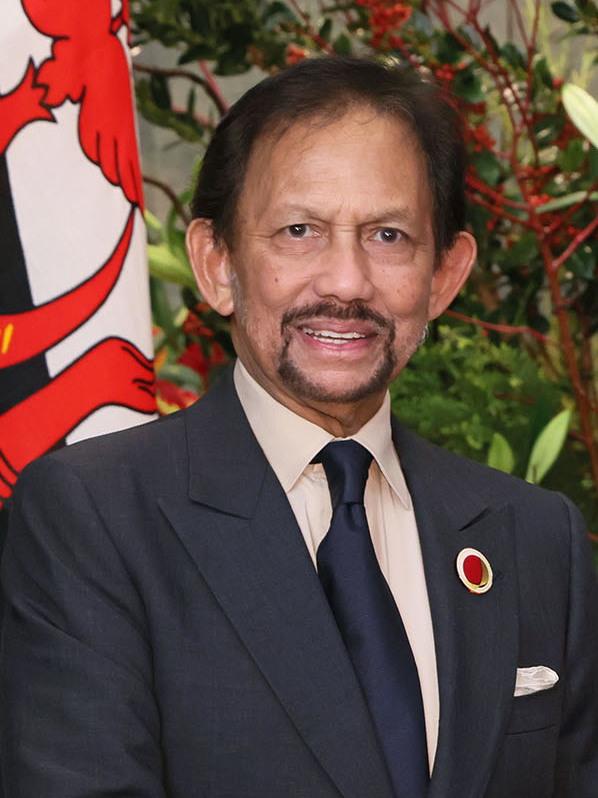
Brunei
Hassanal Bolkiah,
Sultan

Canada
Mark Carney,
Prime Minister

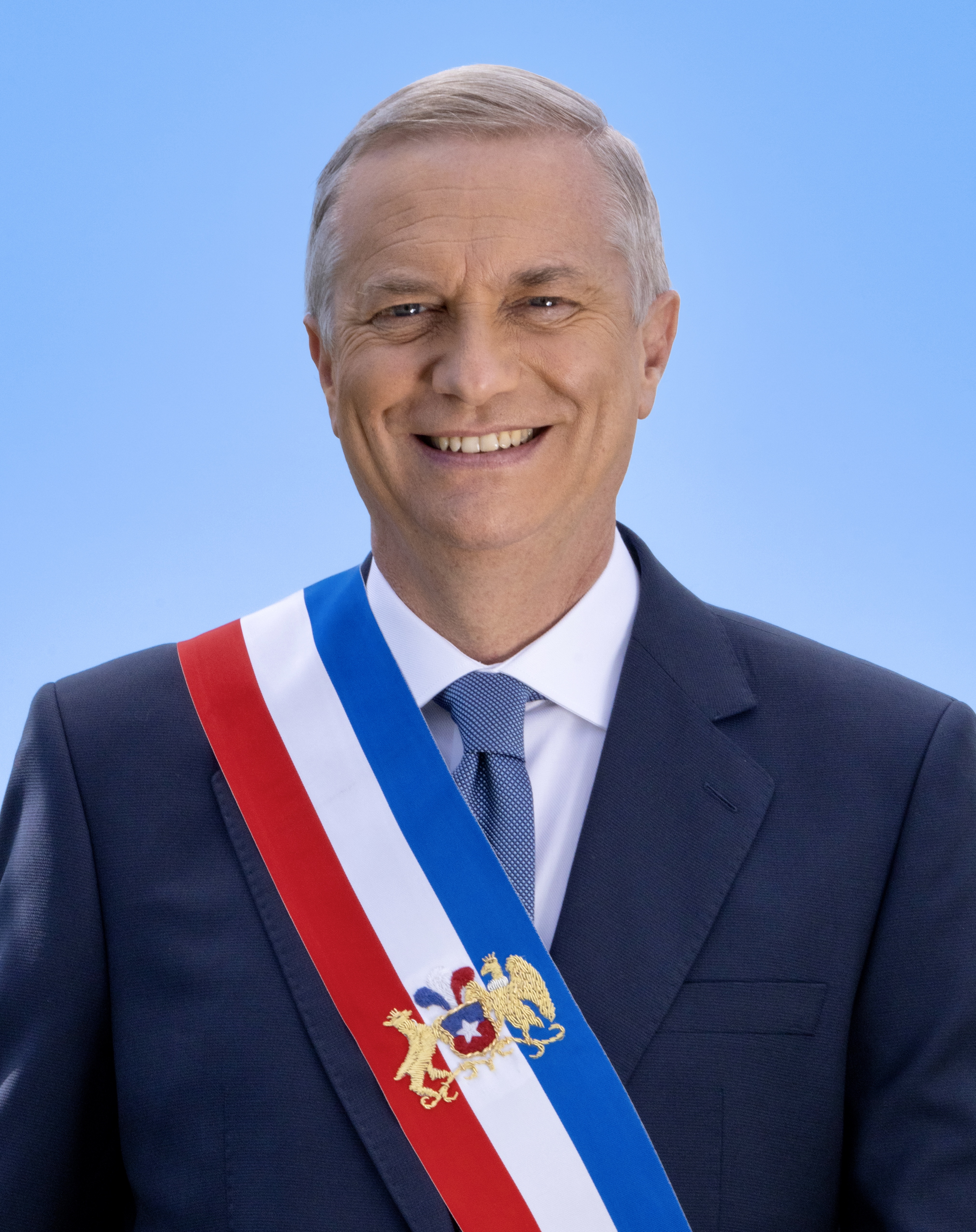
Chile
José Antonio Kast,
President

China
Xi Jinping,
CCP General Secretary and President (host)

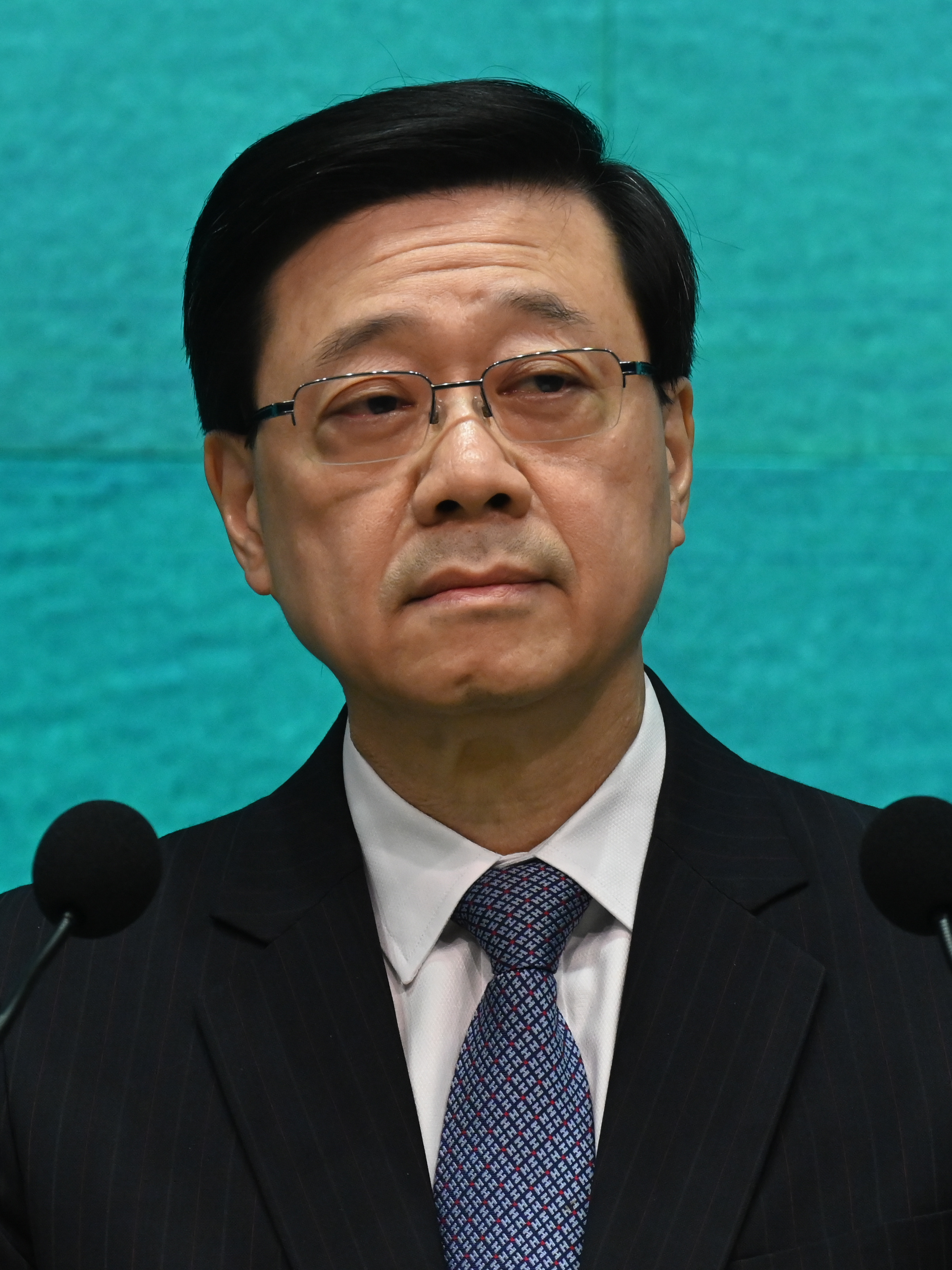
Hong Kong
John Lee Ka-chiu,
Chief Executive

Indonesia
Prabowo Subianto,
President

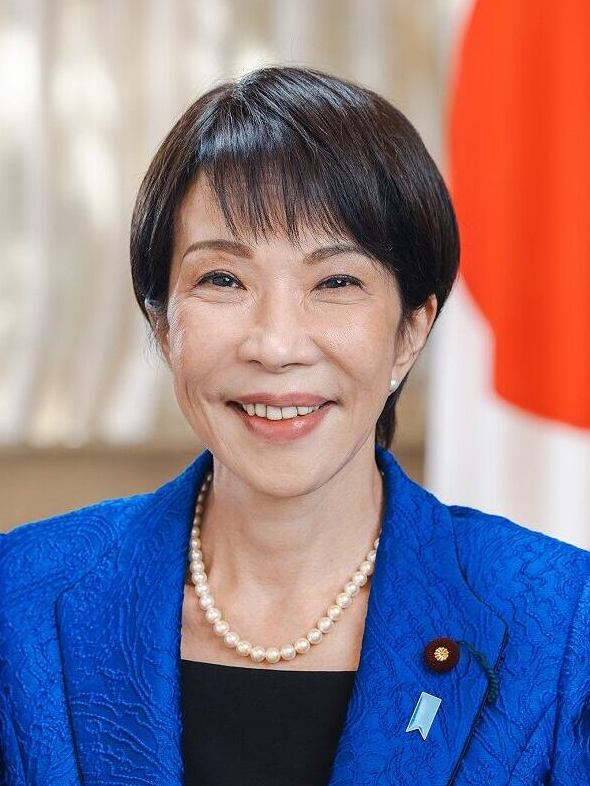
Japan
Sanae Takaichi,
Prime Minister

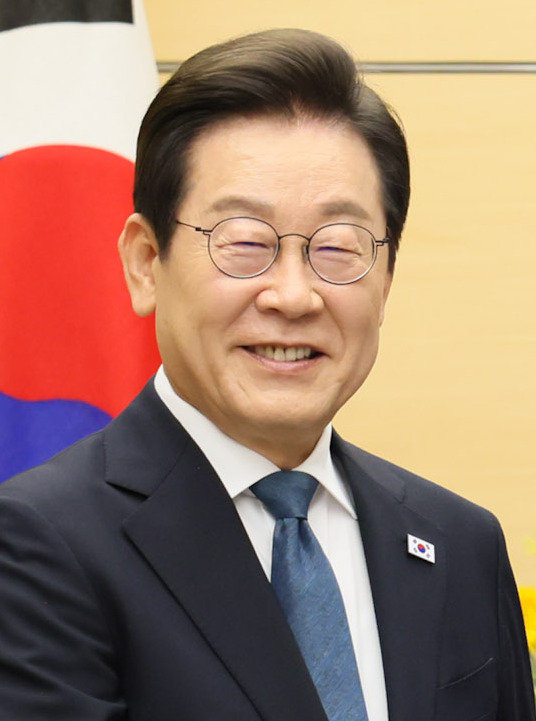
South Korea
Lee Jae Myung,
President

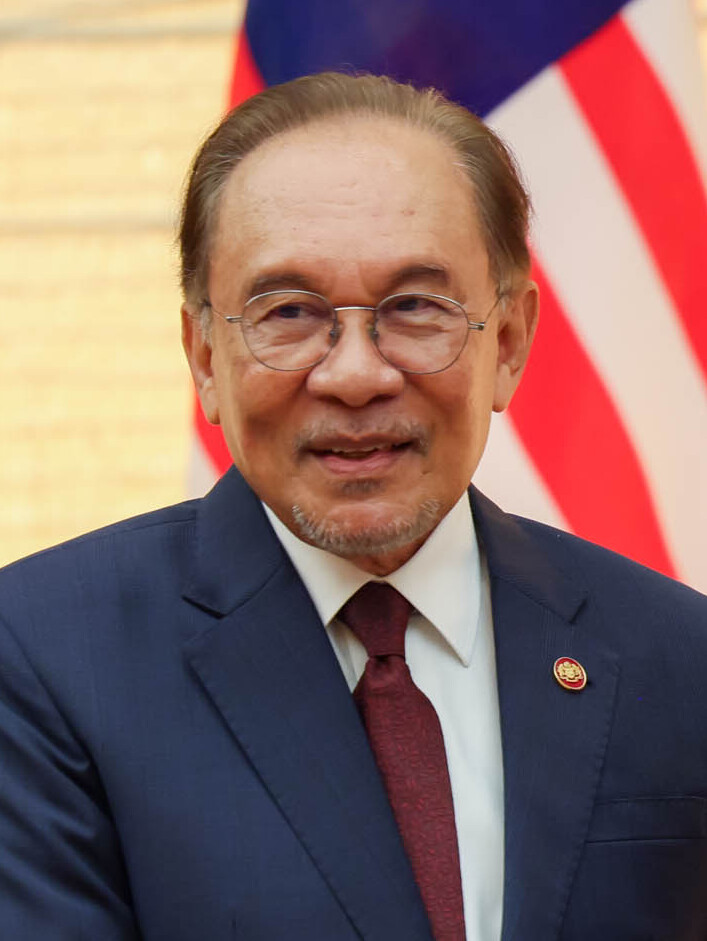
Malaysia
Anwar Ibrahim,
Prime Minister

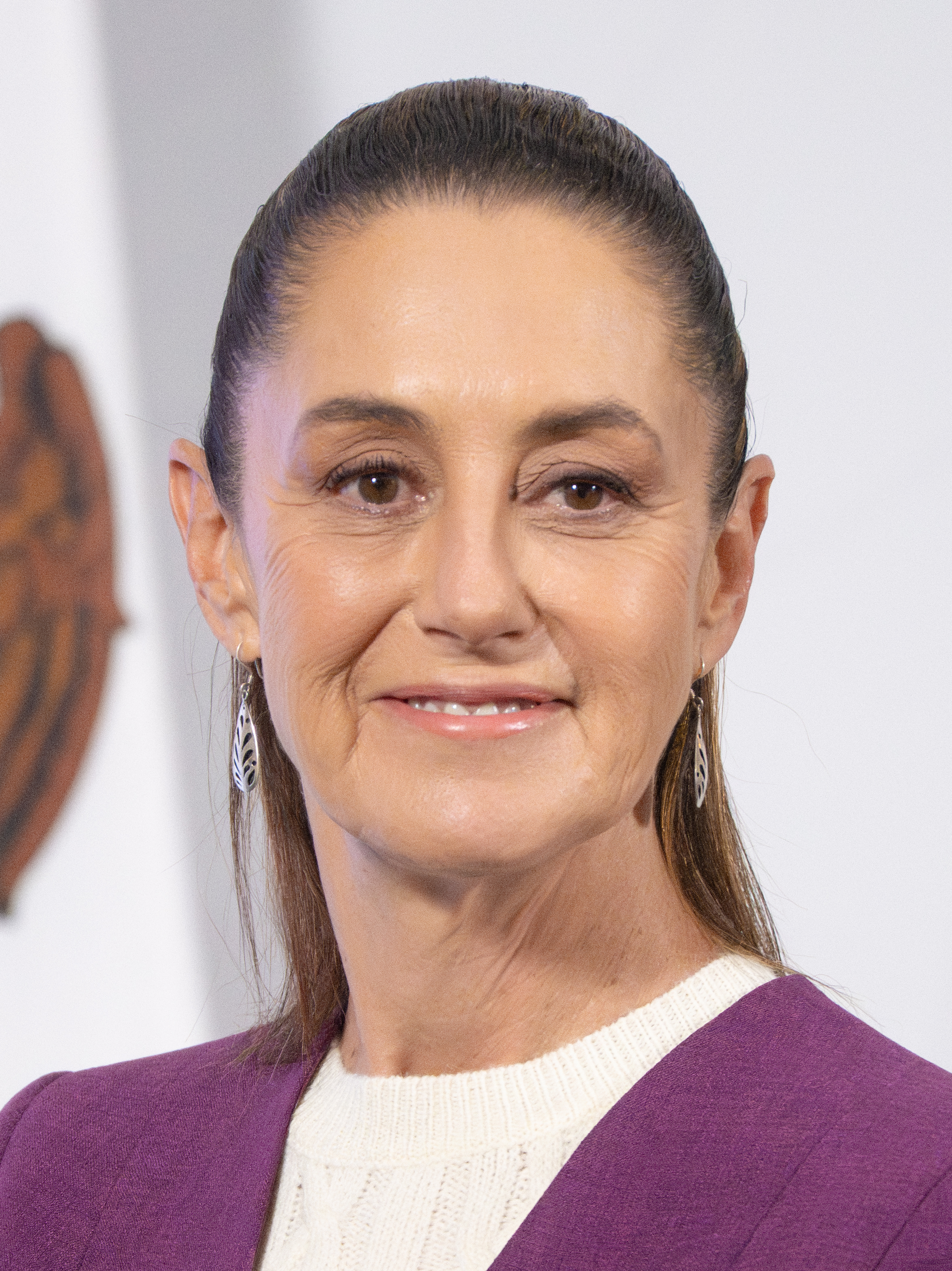
Mexico
Claudia Sheinbaum,
President

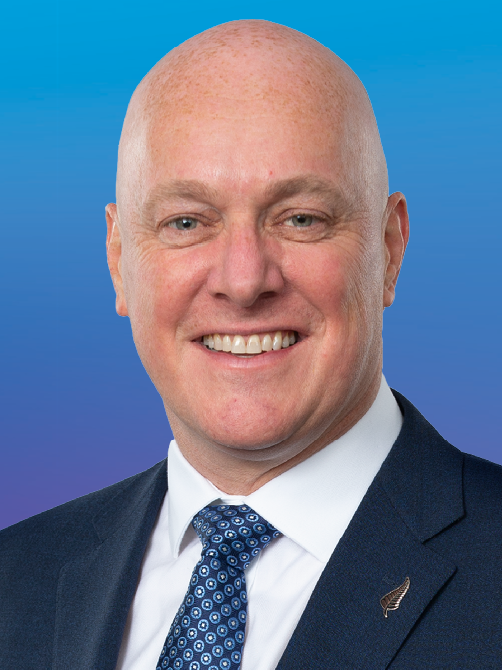
New Zealand
Christopher Luxon,
Prime Minister

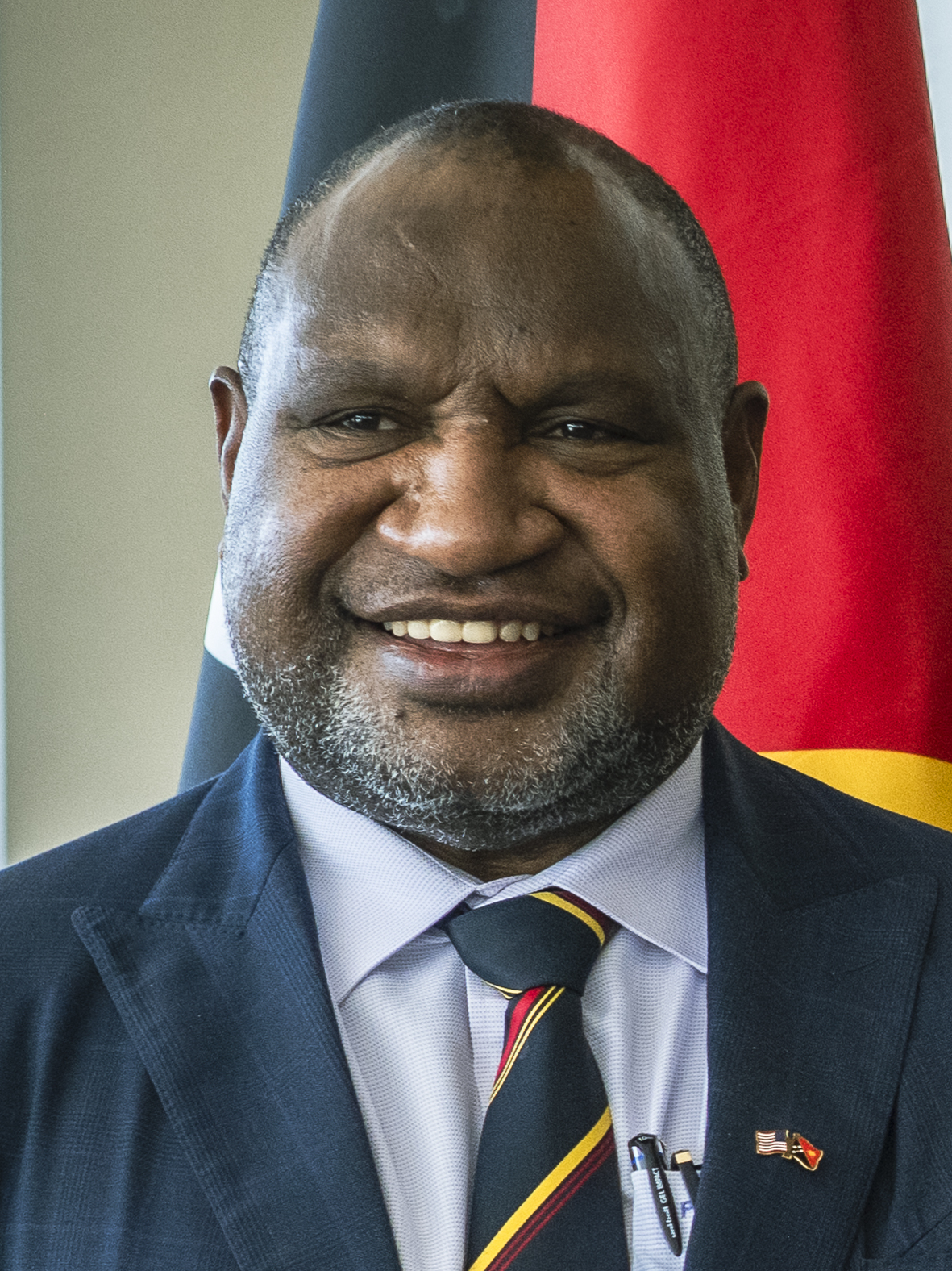
Papua New Guinea
James Marape,
Prime Minister

Peru
Keiko Fujimori,
President

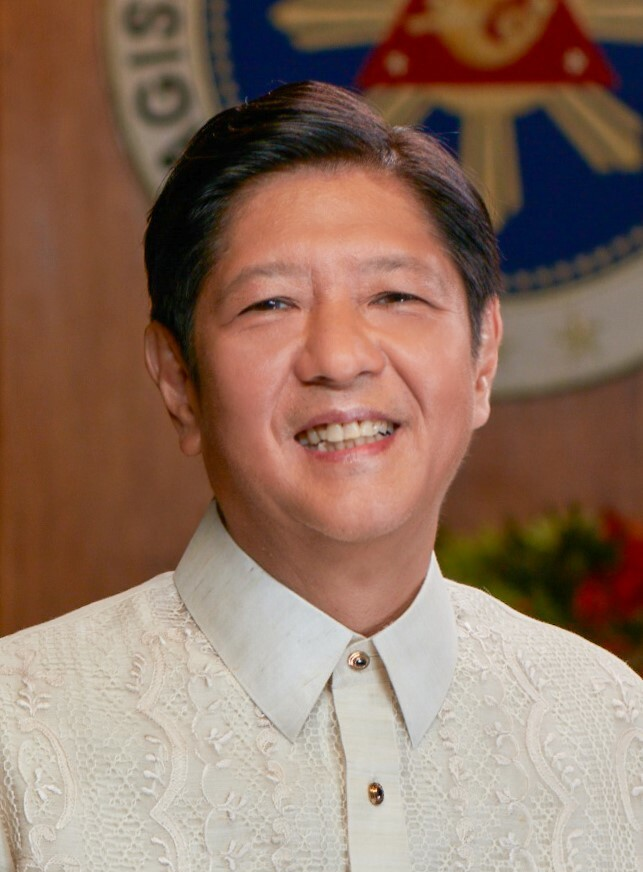
Philippines
Bongbong Marcos,
President

Russia
Vladimir Putin,
President

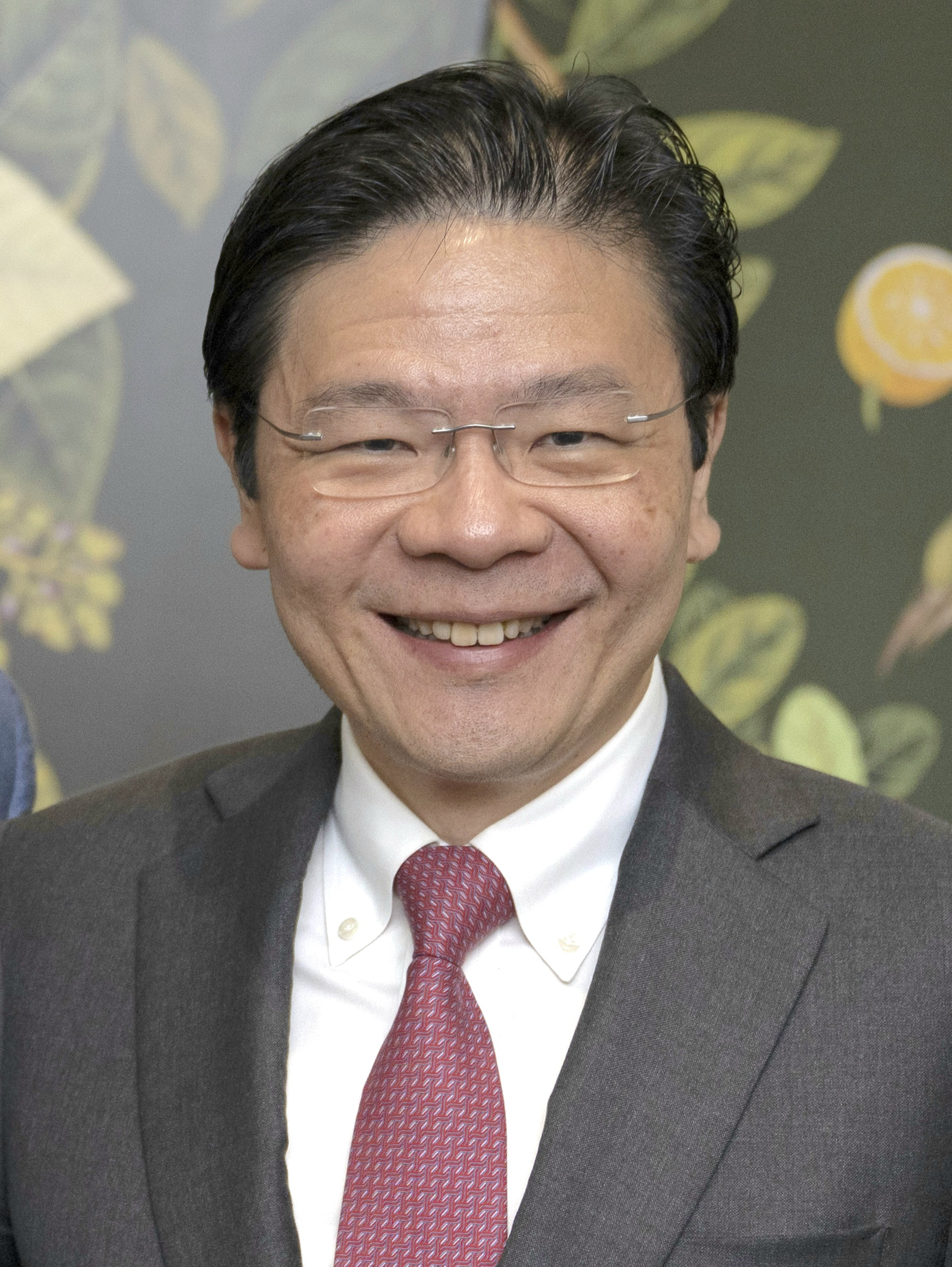
Singapore
Lawrence Wong,
Prime Minister

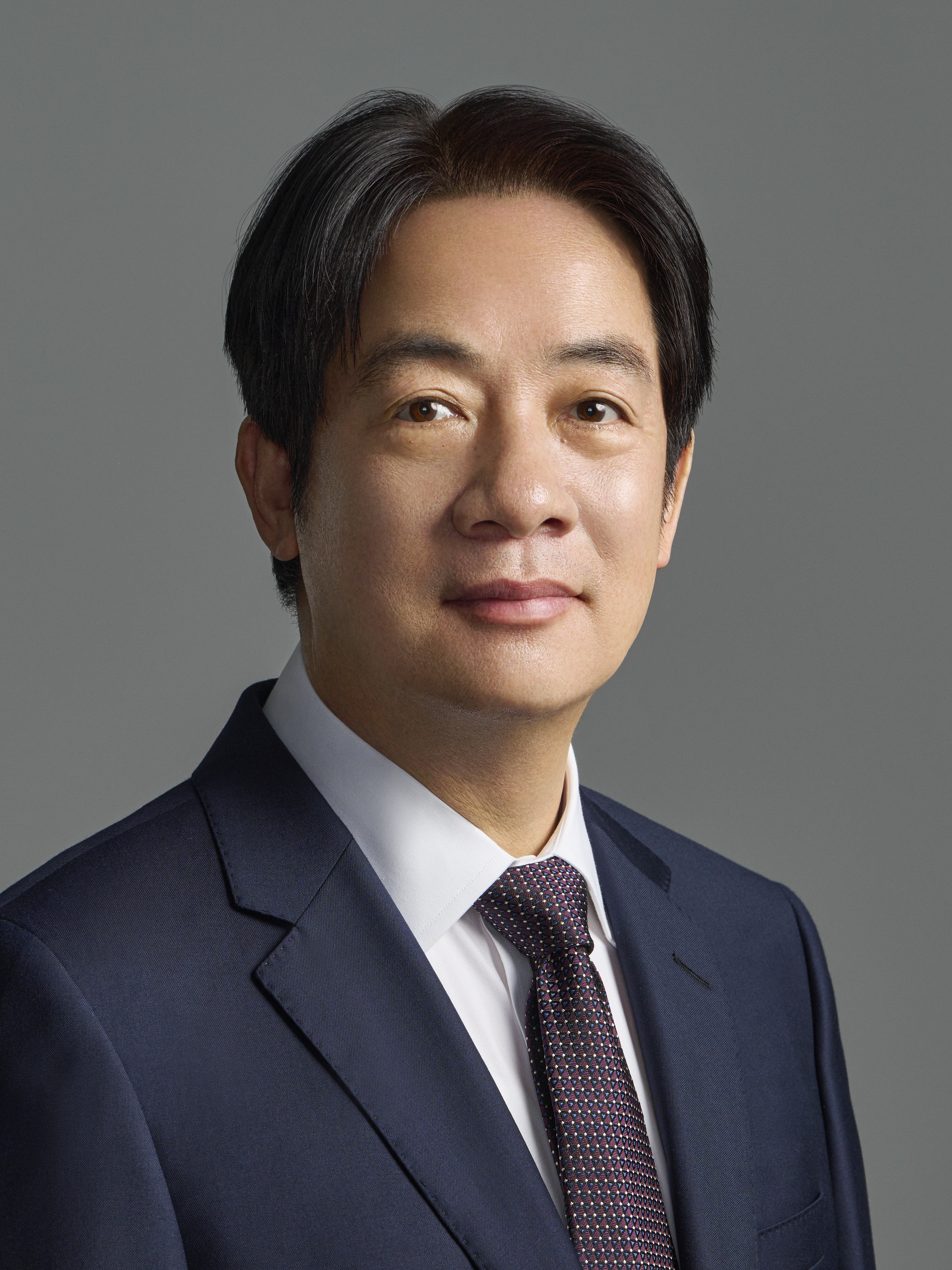
Taiwan
Lai Ching-te,
President
(represented by Stan Shih)

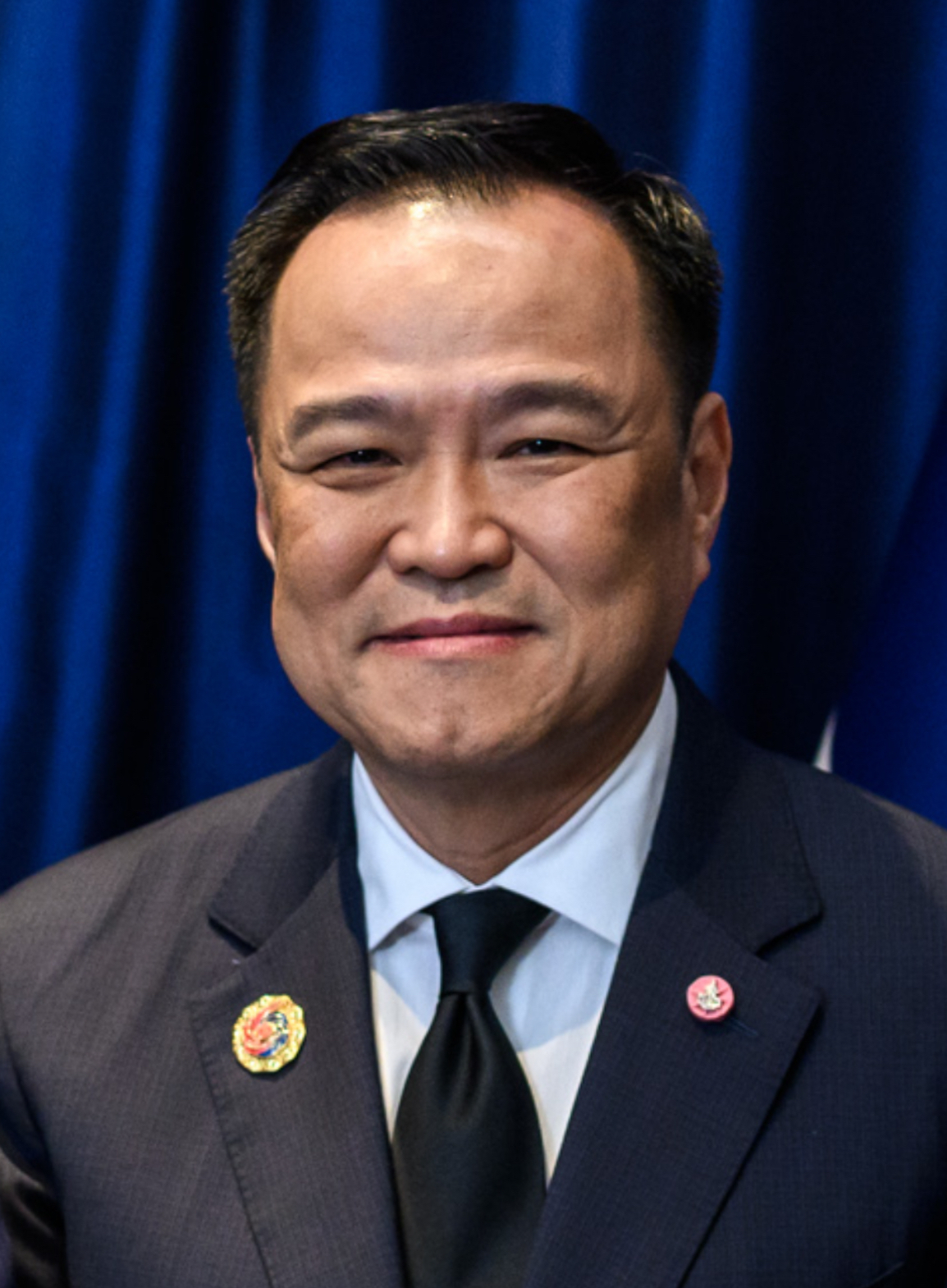
Thailand
Anutin Charnvirakul,
Prime Minister

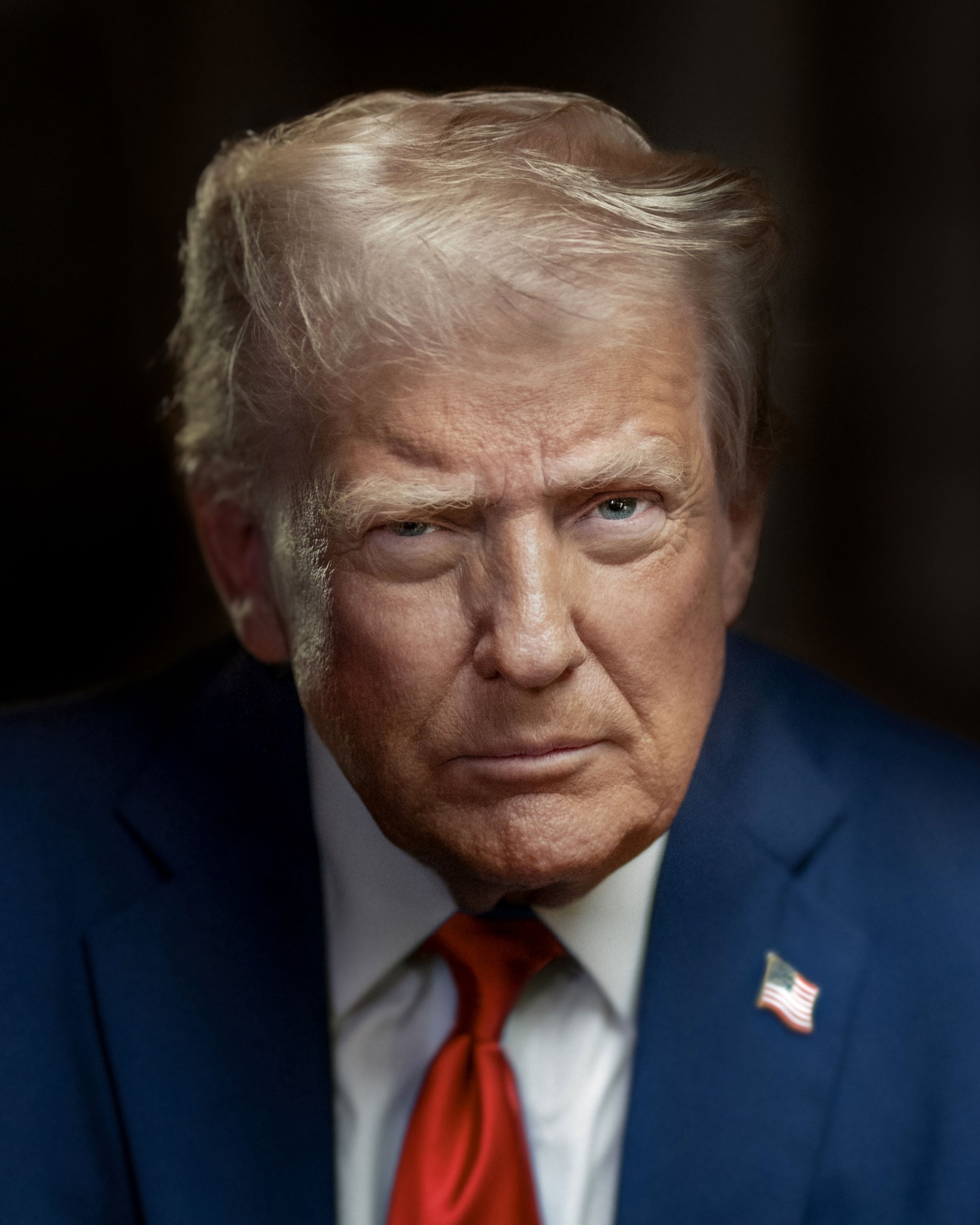
United States
Donald Trump,
President

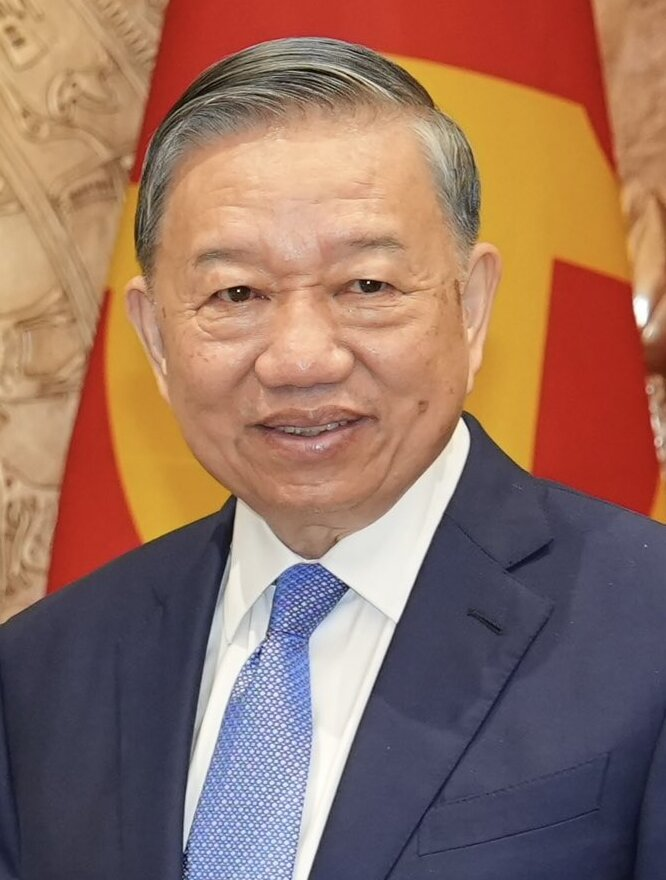
Vietnam
Tô Lâm,
CPV General Secretary and President

== Possible enlargement ==
Current members Announced interest in membership

India has requested membership in APEC, and received initial support from the United States, South Korea, Australia, and Papua New Guinea. Officials have decided not to allow India to join for various reasons, including the fact that India does not border the Pacific Ocean, which all current members do. However, India was invited to be an observer for the first time in November 2011.

Bangladesh, Pakistan, Sri Lanka, Macau, Mongolia, Laos, Cambodia, Costa Rica, Colombia, Panama, and Ecuador are among a dozen other economies that have applied for membership in APEC. Colombia applied for APEC's membership as early as in 1995, but its bid was halted as the organisation stopped accepting new members from 1993 to 1996, and the moratorium was further prolonged to 2007 due to the 1997 Asian financial crisis and then again to 2010.

France, the Pacific Economic Cooperation Council's sole associate member, has also been mentioned for membership; France is present in the Pacific area through its overseas territories of French Polynesia, New Caledonia and Wallis and Futuna.

== Business facilitation ==
As a regional organisation, APEC has always played a leading role in the area of reform initiatives in the area of business facilitation. The APEC Trade Facilitation Action Plan (TFAPI) has contributed to a reduction of 6% in the cost of business transactions across the region between 2002 and 2006. According to APEC's projections, the cost of conducting business transactions will be reduced by another 5% between 2007 and 2010. To this end, a new Trade Facilitation Action Plan has been endorsed. According to a 2008 research brief published by the World Bank as part of its Trade Costs and Facilitation Project, increasing transparency in the region's trading system is critical if APEC is to meet its Bogor Goal targets. The APEC Business Travel Card, a travel document for visa-free business travel within the region is one of the concrete measures to facilitate business. In May 2010 Russia joined the scheme, thus completing the circle.

=== Proposed FTAAP ===
APEC first formally started discussing the concept of a Free Trade Area of the Asia-Pacific (FTAAP) at its summit in 2006 in Hanoi. However, the proposal for such an area has been around since at least 1966 and Japanese economist Kiyoshi Kojima's proposal for a Pacific Free Trade agreement. While it gained little traction, the idea led to the formation of Pacific Trade and Development Conference and then the Pacific Economic Cooperation Council in 1980 and then APEC in 1989.

In the wake of the 2006 summit, economist C. Fred Bergsten advocated a Free Trade Agreement of Asia-Pacific, including the United States amongst the proposed parties to any agreement at that time. His ideas convinced the APEC Business Advisory Council to support this concept. Relatedly, ASEAN and existing free trade agreement (FTA) partners negotiated the Regional Comprehensive Economic Partnership (RCEP), not officially including Russia. The Trans-Pacific Partnership (TPP) without China or Russia involved became the US-promoted trade negotiation in the region. At the APEC summit in Beijing in 2014, the three plans were all in discussion. President Obama hosted a TPP meeting at the US Embassy in Beijing in advance of the APEC gathering.

The proposal for a FTAAP arose due to the lack of progress in the Doha round of World Trade Organization negotiations, and as a way to overcome the "noodle bowl" effect created by overlapping and conflicting elements of the copious free trade agreements – there were approximately 60 free trade agreements in 2007, with an additional 117 in the process of negotiation in Southeast Asia and the Asia-Pacific region. In 2012, ASEAN+6 countries alone had 339 free trade agreements – many of which were bilateral. (Note: "As of January 2012 ASEAN countries have 186 FTAs implemented, signed, under negotiation or under proposal/study, which is substantial progress since… 1992. The ASEAN+6 countries have a total of 339 FTAs, including between ASEAN countries and the '+6' countries.")

The FTAAP is more ambitious in scope than the Doha round, which limits itself to reducing trade restrictions. The FTAAP would create a free trade zone that would considerably expand commerce and economic growth in the region. The economic expansion and growth in trade could exceed the expectations of other regional free trade areas such as the ASEAN Plus Three (ASEAN + China, South Korea and Japan). Some criticisms include that the diversion of trade within APEC members would create trade imbalances, market conflicts and complications with nations of other regions. The development of the FTAAP is expected to take many years, involving essential studies, evaluations and negotiations between member economies. It is also affected by the absence of political will and popular agitations and lobbying against free trade in domestic politics.

At the 2014 APEC summit in Beijing, APEC leaders agreed to launch "a collective strategic study" on the FTAAP and instruct officials to undertake the study, consult stakeholders and report the result by the end of 2016. APEC Executive Director Alan Bollard revealed in the Elite Talk show that FTAAP will be APEC's big goal out into the future.

The Trans-Pacific Partnership included 12 of the 21 APEC members and had provisions for the accession of other APEC members, five of which expressed interest in membership.

== APEC Study Centre Consortium ==
In 1993, APEC Leaders decided to establish a network of APEC Study Centres (APCs) among universities and research institutions in member economies. The purpose is to foster cooperation among tertiary and research institutes of member economies, thus having better academic collaboration on key regional economic challenges. To encourage independence from the APEC conference, the APCs are funded independently and choose their own research topics.

As of December 2018, there are 70 APCs among the member economies. An annual conference is usually held in the host economy for that year.

== APEC Business Advisory Council ==
The APEC Business Advisory Council (ABAC) was created by the APEC Economic Leaders in November 1995 with the aim of providing advice to the APEC Economic Leaders on ways to achieve the Bogor Goals and other specific business sector priorities, and to provide the business perspective on specific areas of co-operation.

Each economy nominates up to three members from the private sector to ABAC. These business leaders represent a wide range of industry sectors. ABAC provides an annual report to APEC Economic Leaders containing recommendations to improve the business and investment environment in the Asia-Pacific region, and outlining business views about priority regional issues. ABAC is also the only non-governmental organisation that is on the official agenda of the APEC Economic Leaders' Meeting.

== Annual APEC economic leaders' meetings ==
Summary video of the APEC Philippines 1996 meeting

Since its formation in 1989, APEC has held annual meetings with representatives from all member economies. The first four annual meetings were attended by ministerial-level officials. Beginning in 1993, the annual meetings are named APEC Economic Leaders' Meetings and are attended by the heads of government from all member economies except Taiwan, which is represented by a ministerial-level official.

=== Meeting developments ===
In 1997, the APEC meeting was held in Vancouver. Controversy arose after officers of the Royal Canadian Mounted Police used pepper spray against protesters. The protesters objected to the presence of autocratic leaders such as Indonesian president Suharto.

At the 2001 Leaders' Meeting in Shanghai, APEC leaders pushed for a new round of trade negotiations and support for a programme of trade capacity-building assistance, leading to the launch of the Doha Development Agenda a few weeks later. The meeting also endorsed the Shanghai Accord proposed by the United States, emphasising the implementation of open markets, structural reform, and capacity building. As part of the accord, the meeting committed to develop and implement APEC transparency standards, reduce trade transaction costs in the Asia-Pacific region by five percent over five years, and pursue trade liberalisation policies relating to information technology goods and services.

In 2003, Jemaah Islamiah leader Riduan Isamuddin had planned to attack the APEC Leaders Meeting to be held in Bangkok in October. He was captured in the city of Ayutthaya, Thailand by Thai police on 11 August 2003, before he could finish planning the attack.

Chile became the first South American nation to host the Leaders' Meeting in 2004. The agenda of that year was focused on terrorism and commerce, small and medium enterprise development, and contemplation of free agreements and regional trade agreements.

The 2005 Leaders' Meeting was held in Busan, South Korea. The meeting focused on the Doha round of World Trade Organization (WTO) negotiations, leading up to the WTO Ministerial Conference of 2005 held in Hong Kong in December. Weeks earlier, trade negotiations in Paris were held between several WTO members, including the United States and the European Union, centred on reducing agricultural trade barriers. APEC leaders at the summit urged the European Union to agree to reduce farm subsidies. In a continuation of the climate information sharing initiative established by the APEC Climate Network working group, it was decided by the leaders to install the APEC Climate Center in Busan. Peaceful protests against APEC were staged in Busan, but the meeting schedule was not affected.

At the Leaders' Meeting held on 19 November 2006 in Hanoi, APEC leaders called for a new start to global free-trade negotiations while condemning terrorism and other threats to security. APEC also criticised North Korea for conducting a nuclear test and a missile test launch that year, urging the country to take "concrete and effective" steps toward nuclear disarmament. Concerns about nuclear proliferation in the region was discussed in addition to economic topics. The United States and Russia signed an agreement as part of Russia's bid to join the World Trade Organization.

The APEC Australia 2007 Leaders' Meeting was held in Sydney from 2–9 September 2007. The political leaders agreed to an "aspirational goal" of a 25% reduction of energy intensity correlative with economic development. Extreme security measures including airborne sharpshooters and extensive steel-and-concrete barricades were deployed against anticipated protesters and potential terrorists. However, protest activities were peaceful and the security envelope was penetrated with ease by a spoof diplomatic motorcade carrying members of the Australian television programme The Chaser, one of whom was dressed to resemble the Al-Qaeda leader Osama bin Laden.

The APEC Chile 2019, originally to be held 16–17 November 2019 in Chile, was cancelled due to ongoing protests by sections of its population over inequality, the cost of living and police repression.

The 2023 APEC meeting was notable for a lack of consensuses of group members on their stance over the Russia–Ukraine and Gaza conflicts as well as consensus for WTO reforms. The meeting between Biden and Xi was also seen as significant in terms of reducing tensions between the US and China.

=== APEC leaders' group photo ===
At the end of the APEC Economic Leaders' Meeting, the leaders gather for the official APEC Leaders' Family Photo. A tradition has the leaders dressing to reflect the culture of the host member. The tradition dates to the first such meeting in 1993 when then-U.S. President Bill Clinton insisted on informal attire and gave the leaders leather bomber jackets. At the 2010 meeting, Japan had the leaders dress in smart casual rather than the traditional kimono. Similarly, when Honolulu was selected in 2009 as the site for the 2011 APEC meeting, U.S. President Barack Obama joked that he looked forward to seeing the leaders dressed in "flowered shirts and grass skirts". After viewing previous photos, and concerned that having the leaders dress in aloha shirts might give the wrong impression during a period of economic austerity, Obama instead decided it might be time to end the tradition. Leaders were given a specially designed aloha shirt as a gift but were not expected to wear it for the photo. Leaders in Bali, Indonesia at the 2013 conference wore a batik outfit; in China 2014 Tang suit jackets; in the Philippines 2015 barong tagalogs; in Peru 2016 vicuña wool shawls; in 2017 Vietnamese silk shirts.

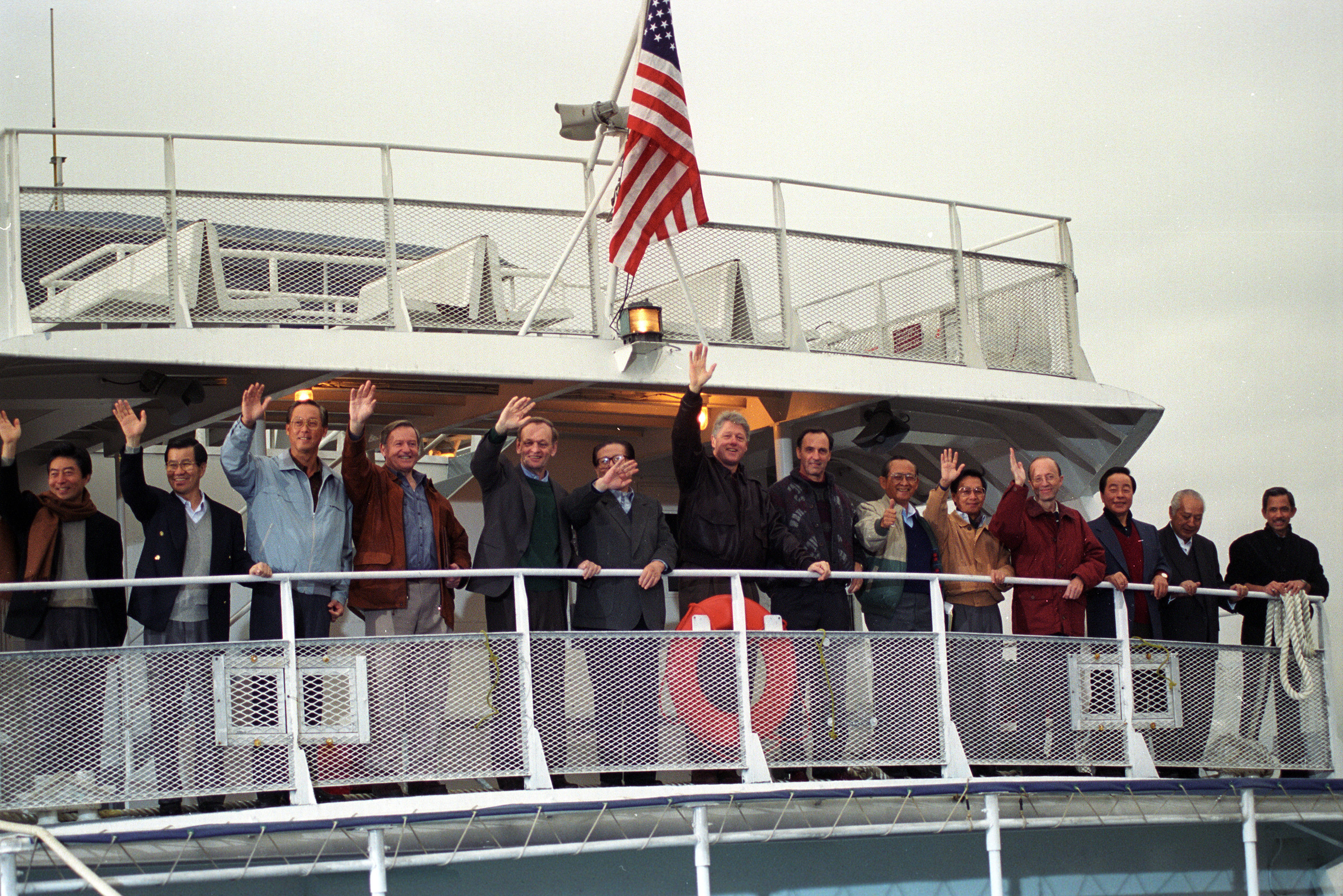
APEC United States 1993

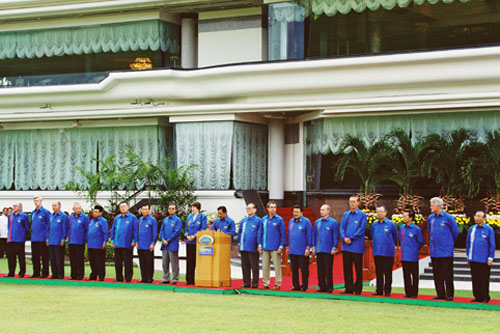
APEC Brunei 2000

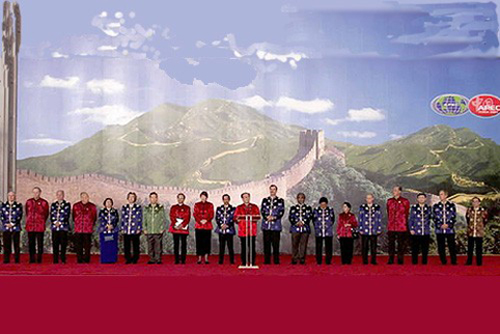
APEC China 2001

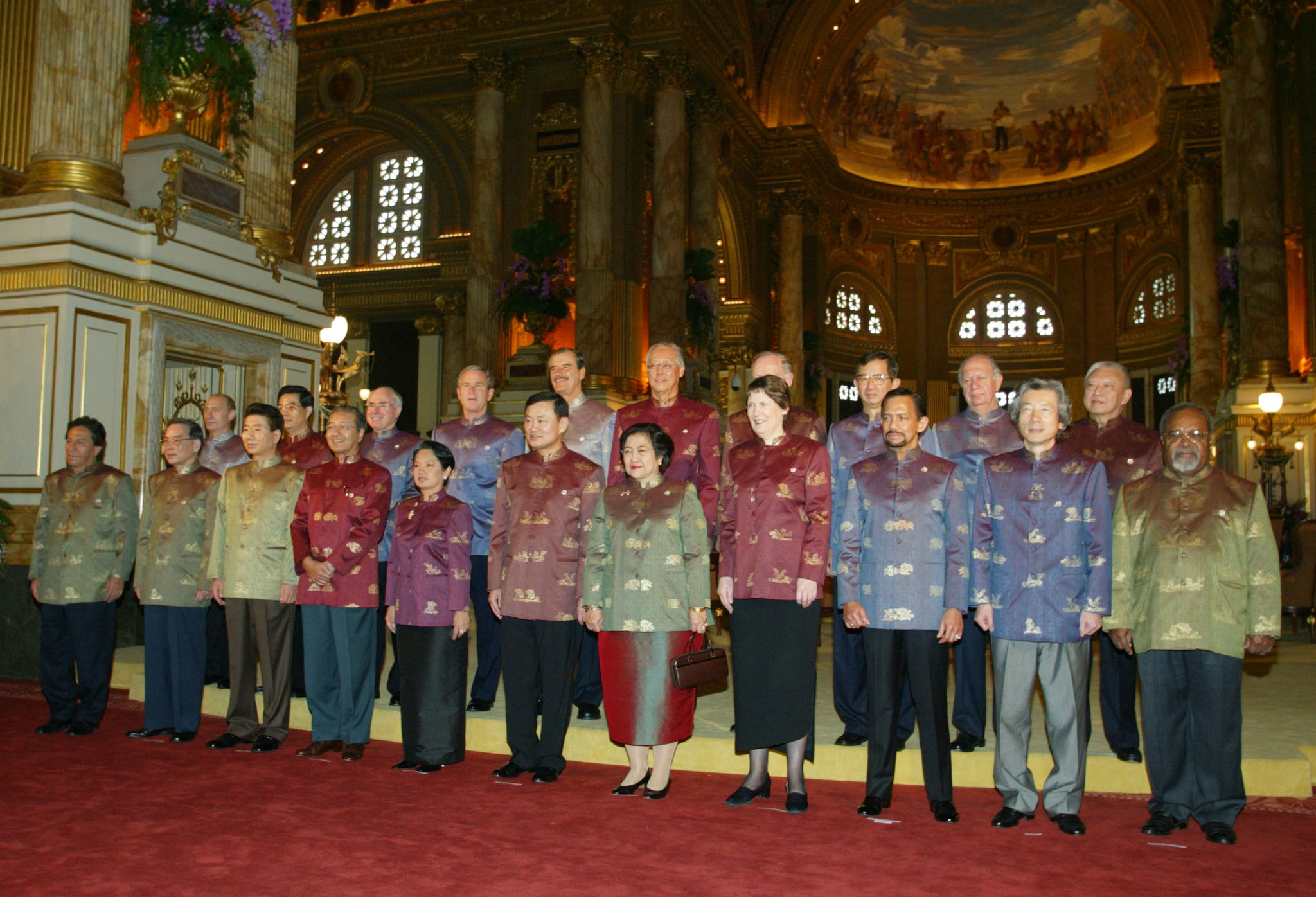
APEC Thailand 2003

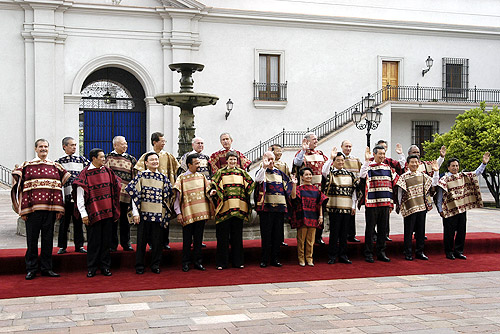
APEC Chile 2004

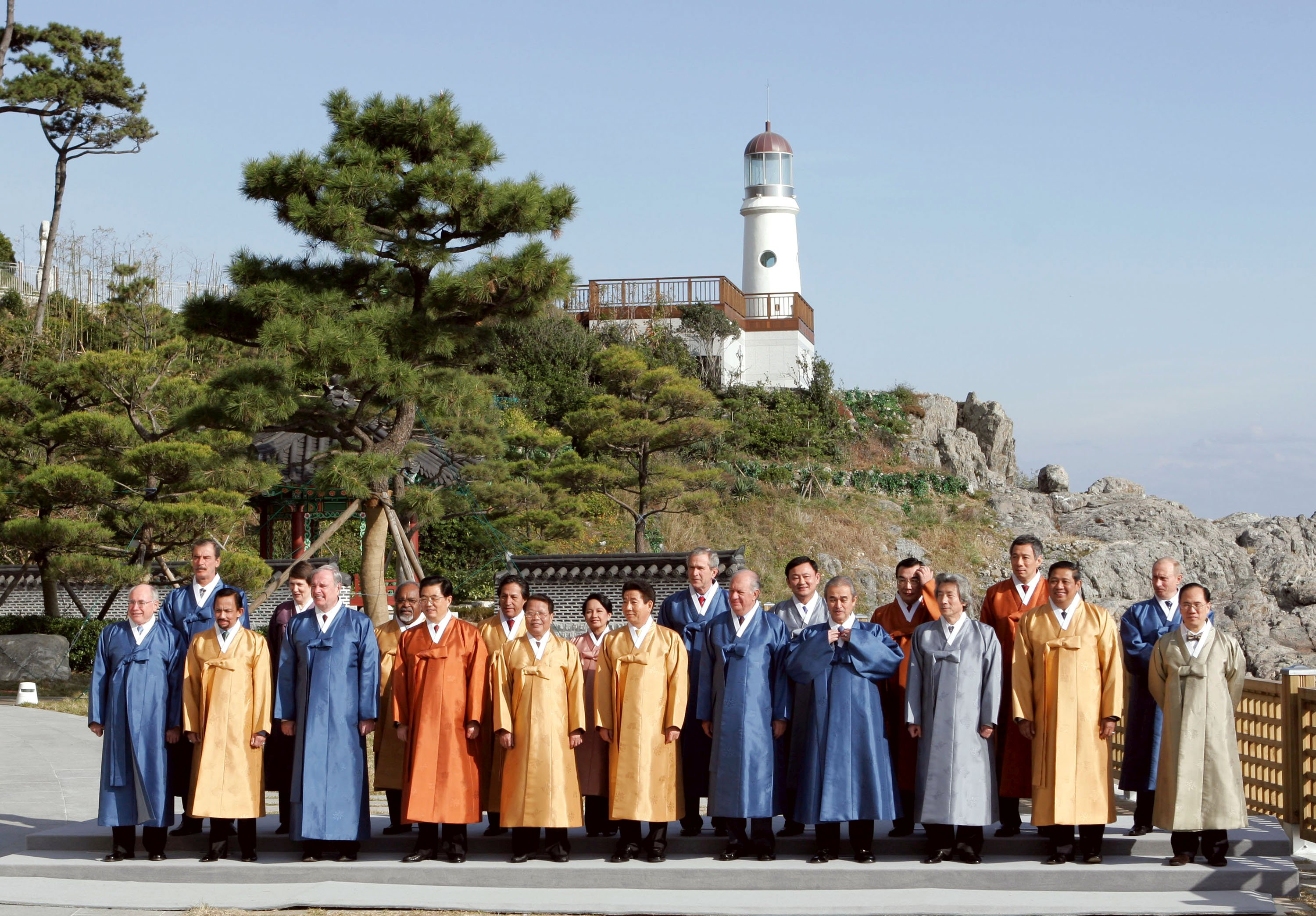
APEC South Korea 2005

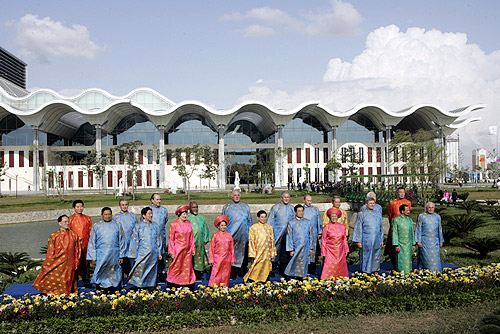
APEC Vietnam 2006

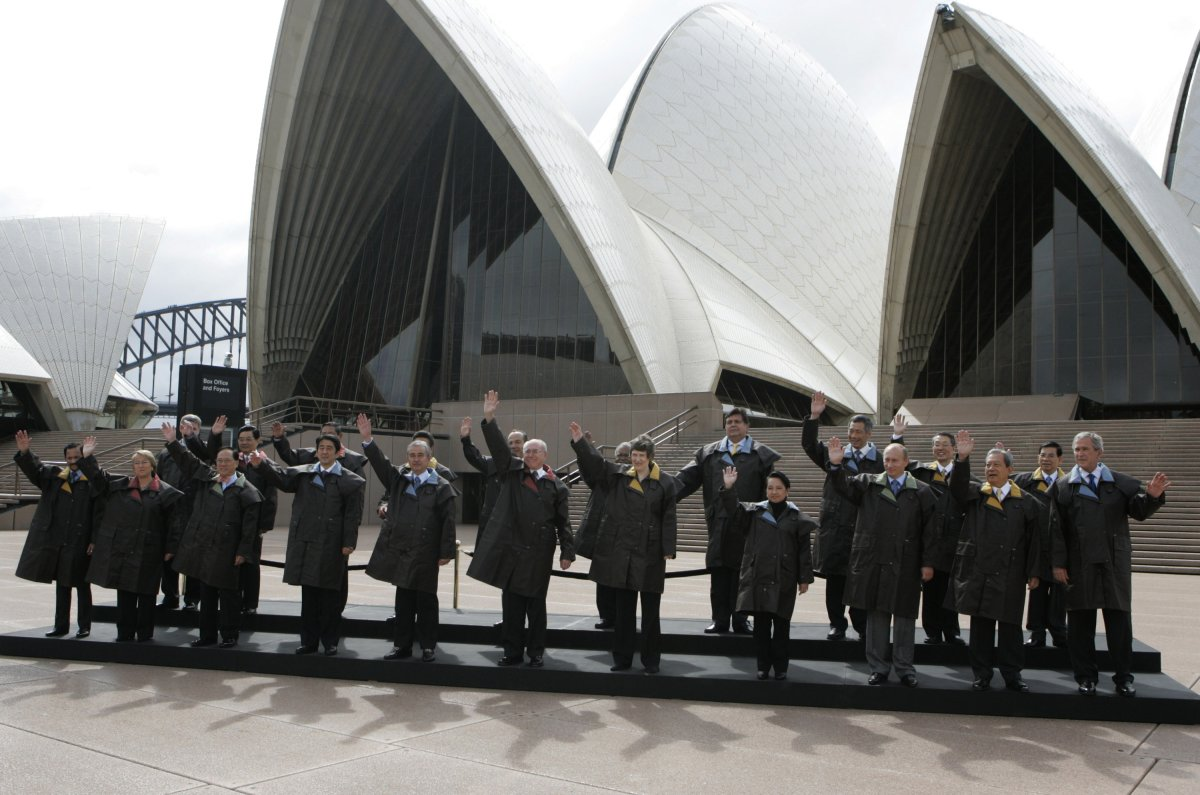
APEC Australia 2007

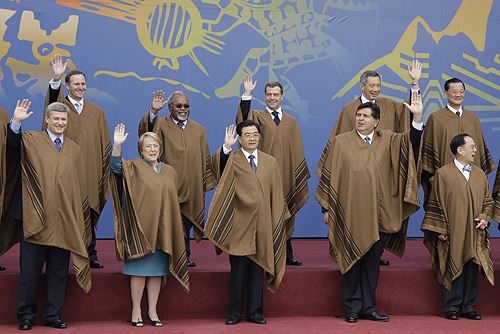
APEC Peru 2008

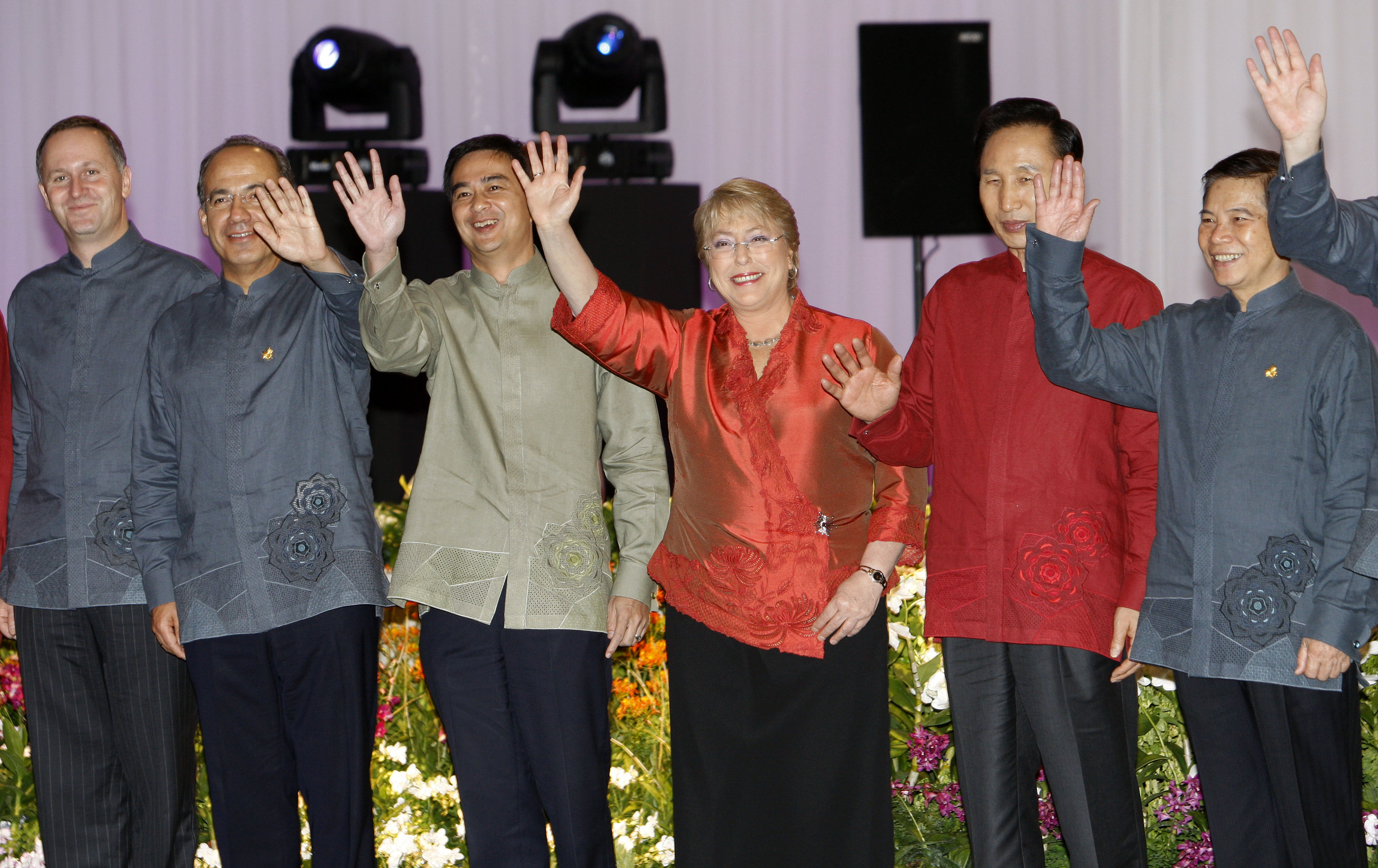
APEC Singapore 2009

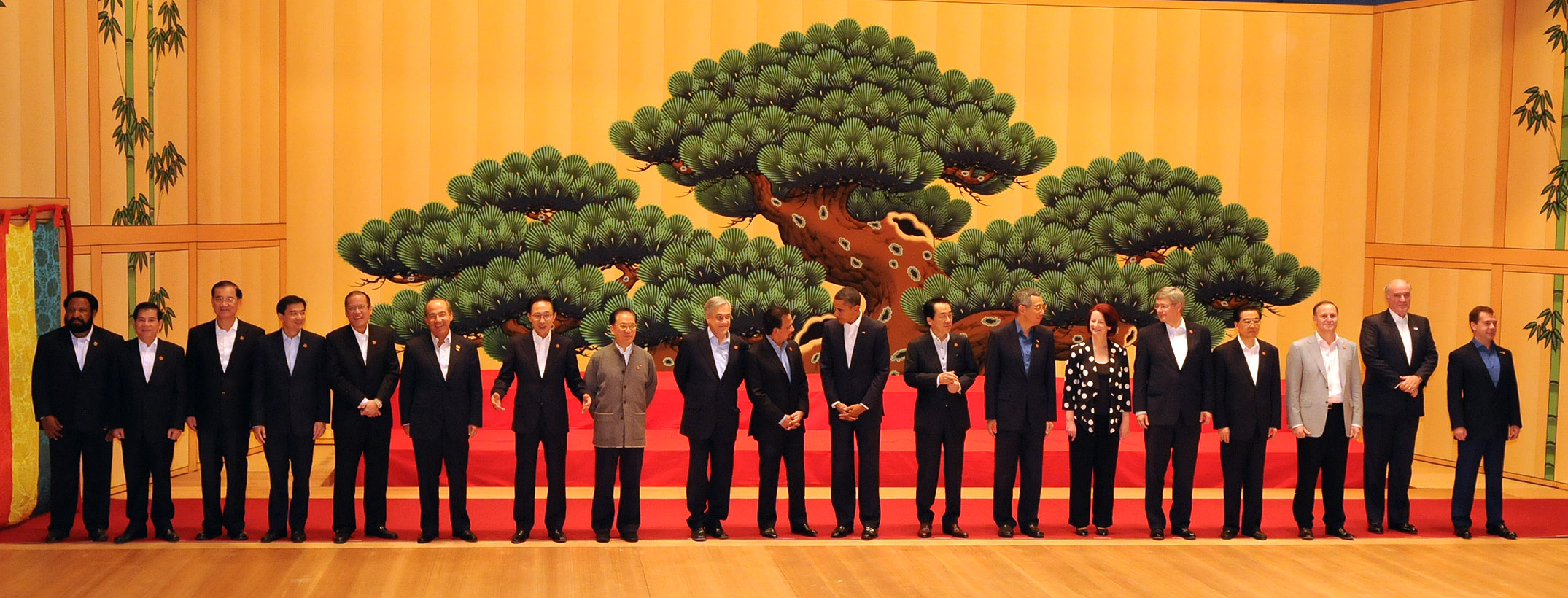
APEC Japan 2010

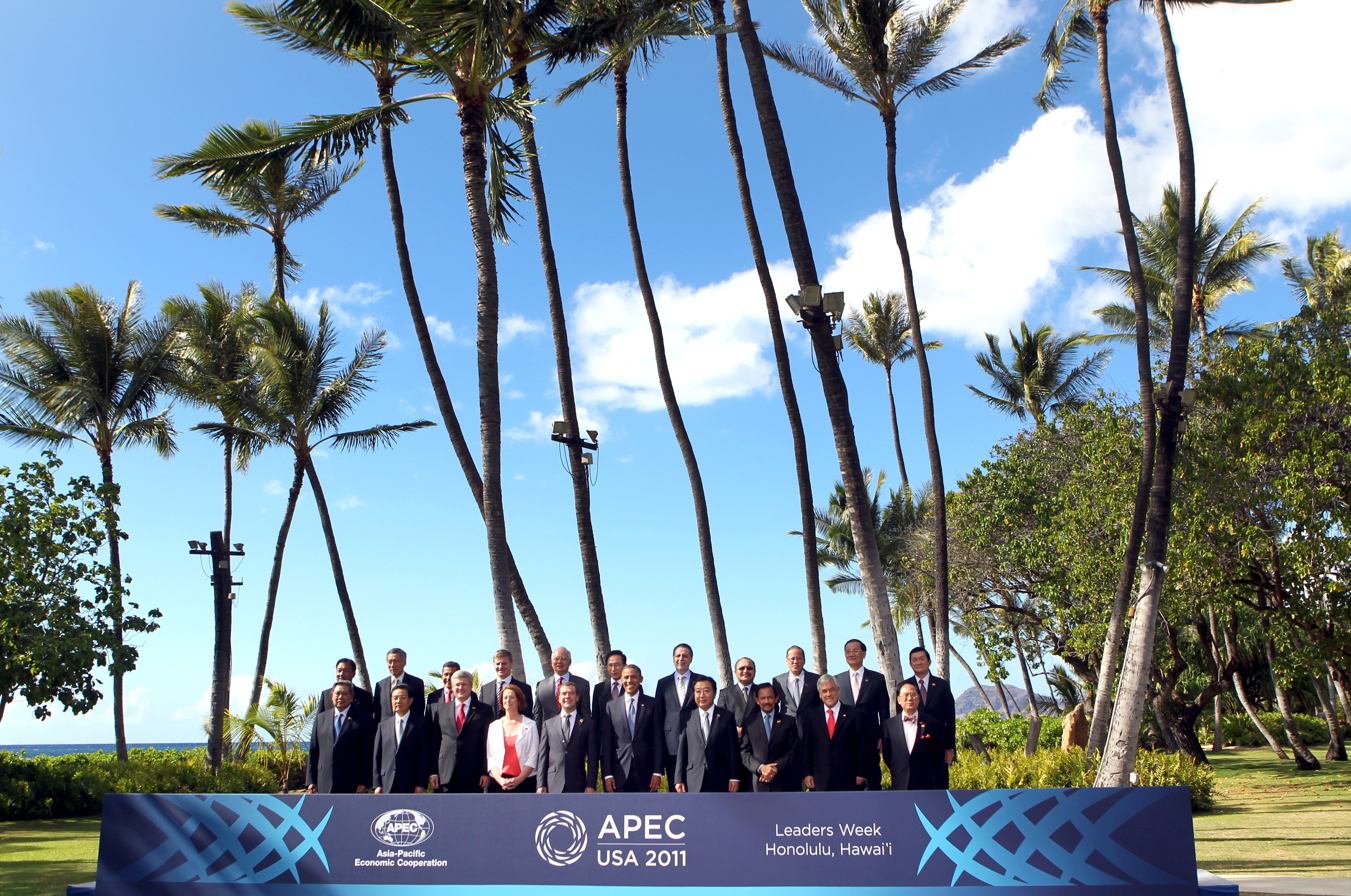
APEC United States 2011

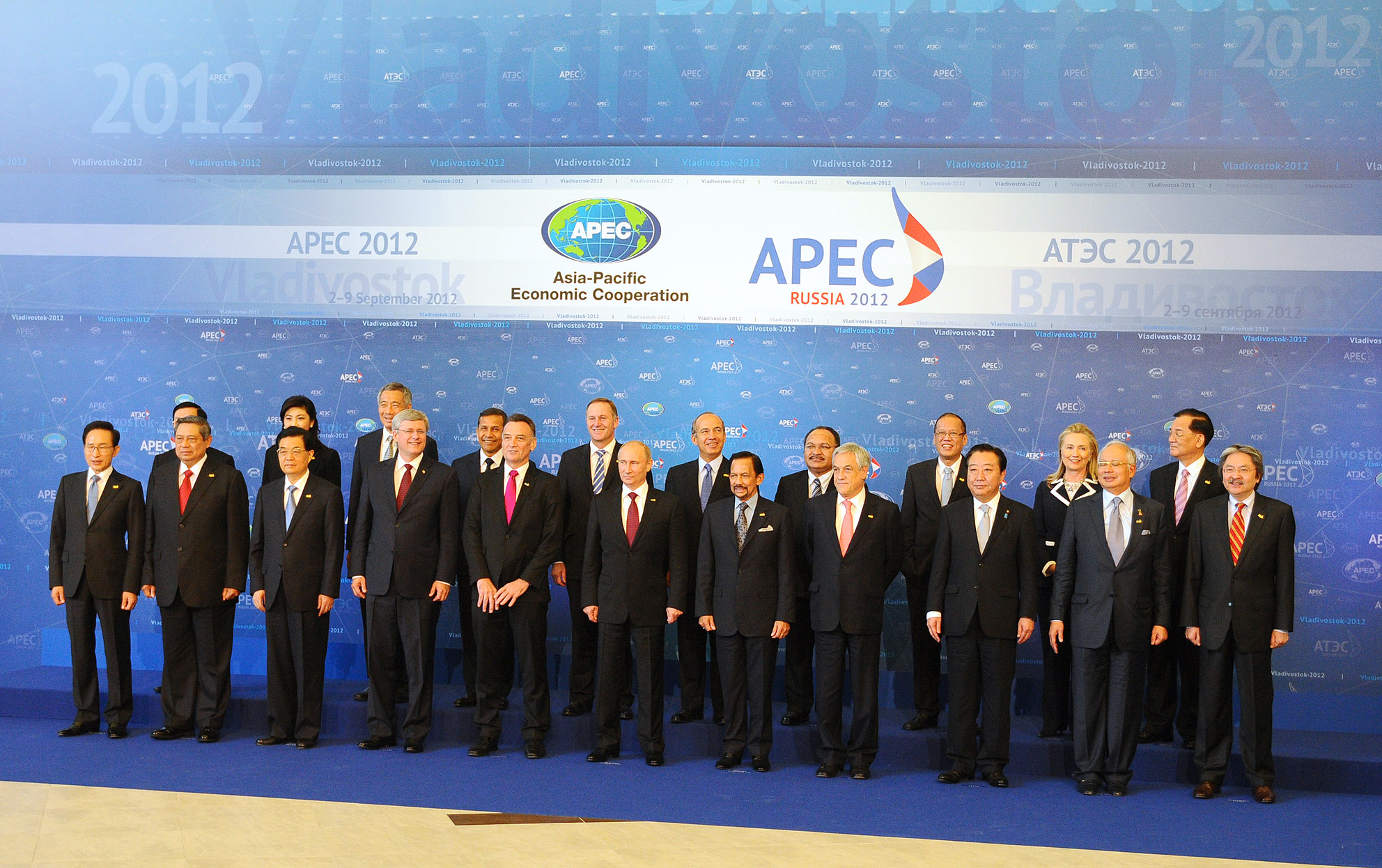
APEC Russia 2012

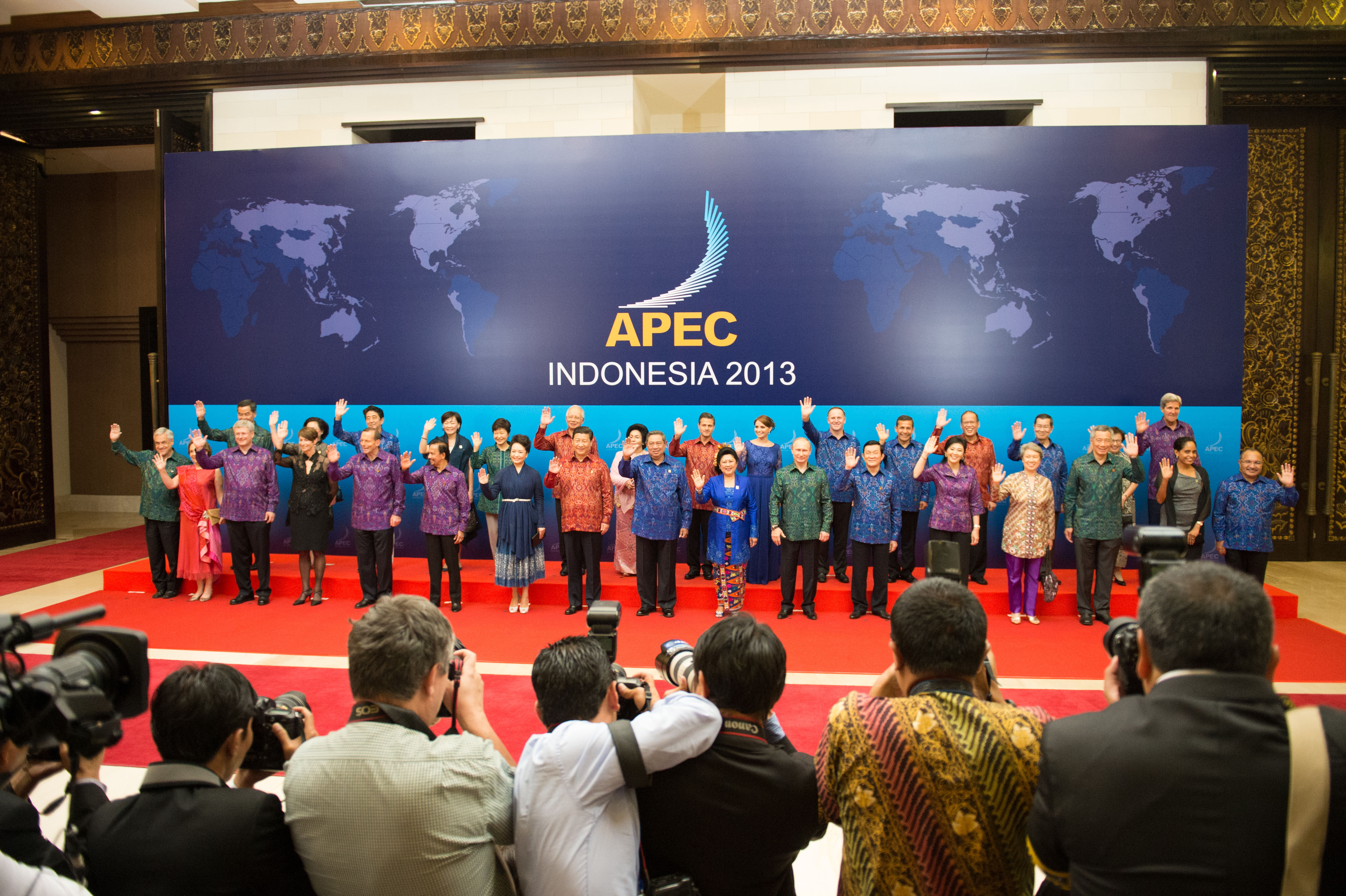
APEC Indonesia 2013

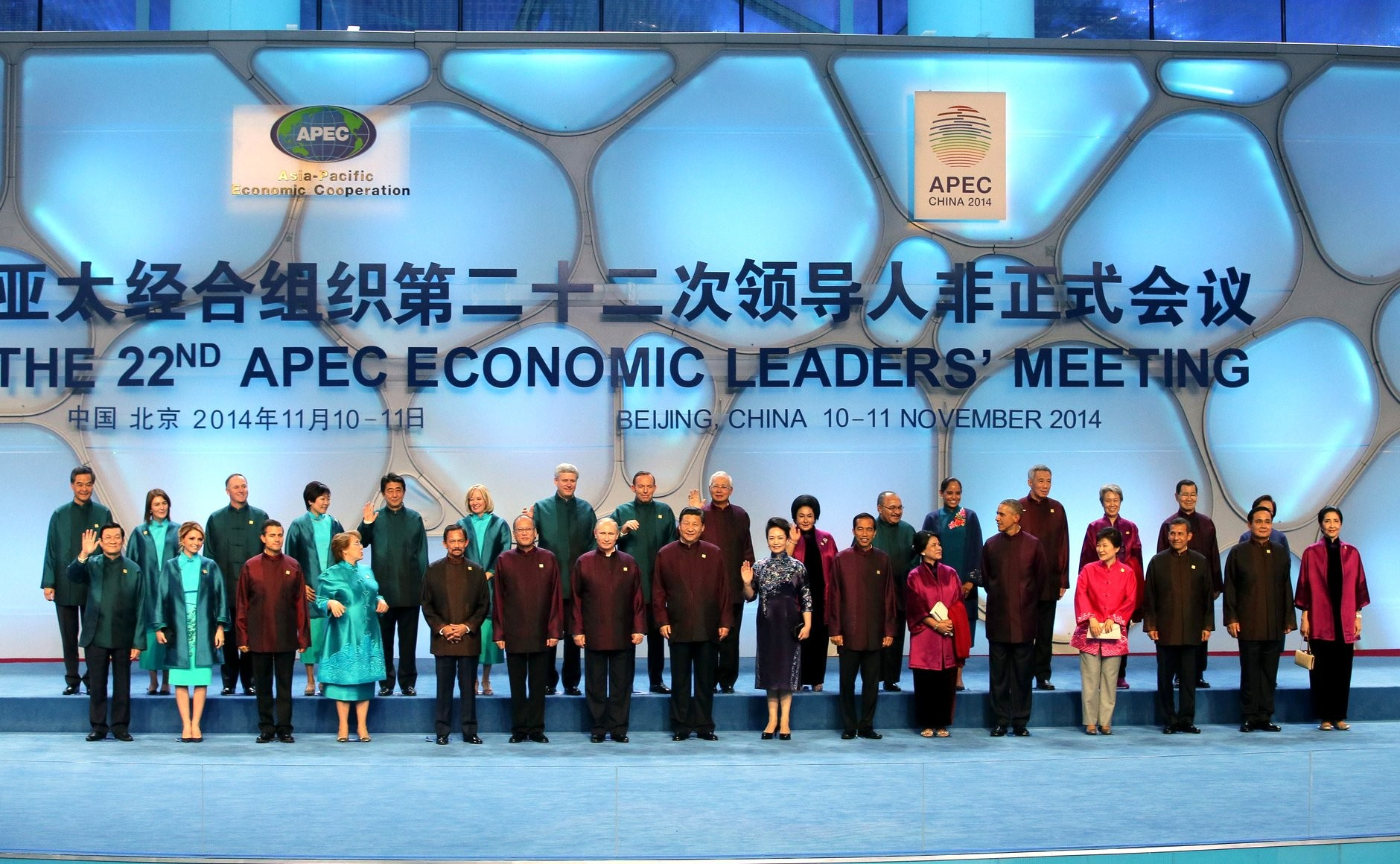
APEC China 2014

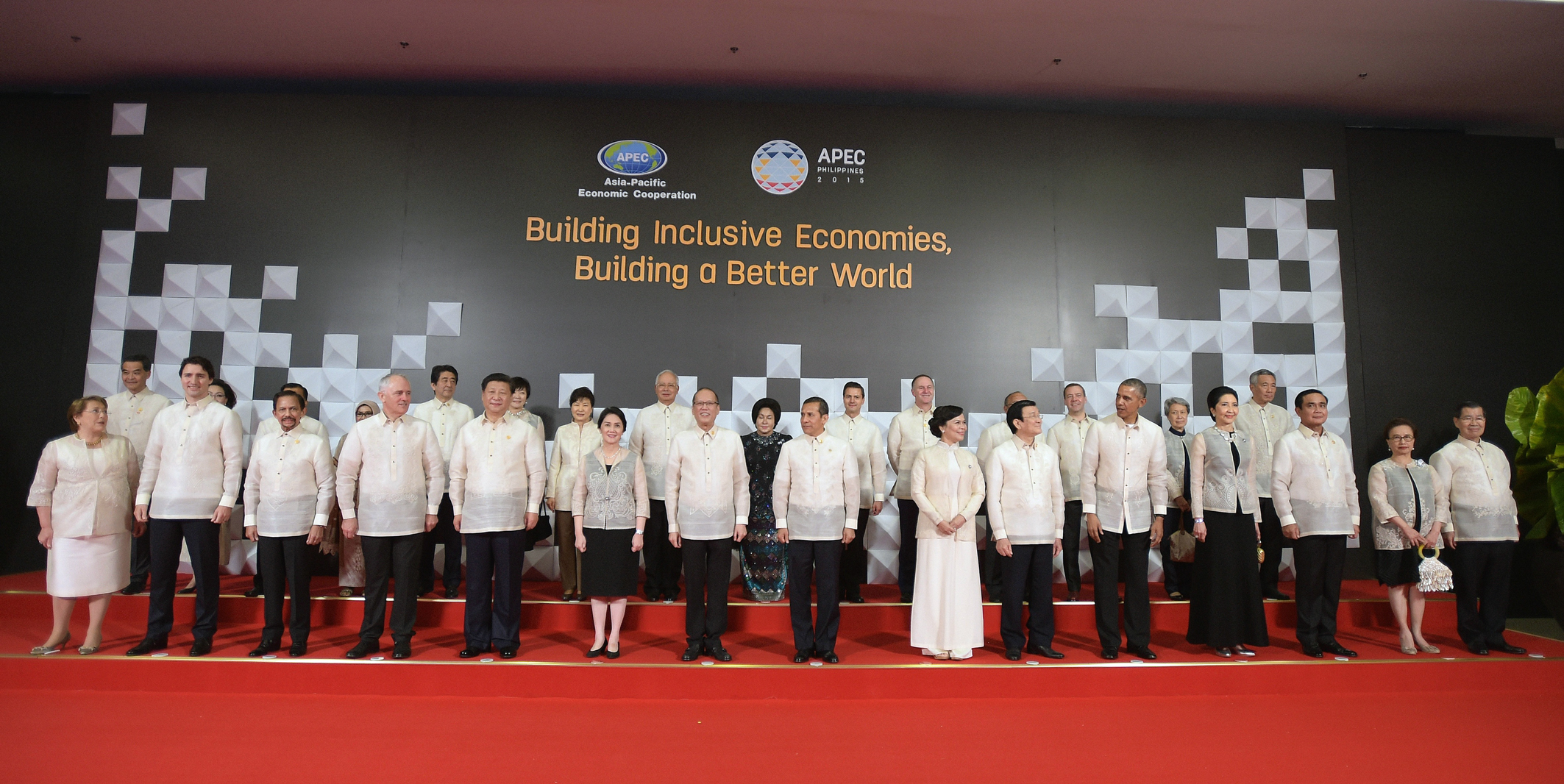
APEC Philippines 2015

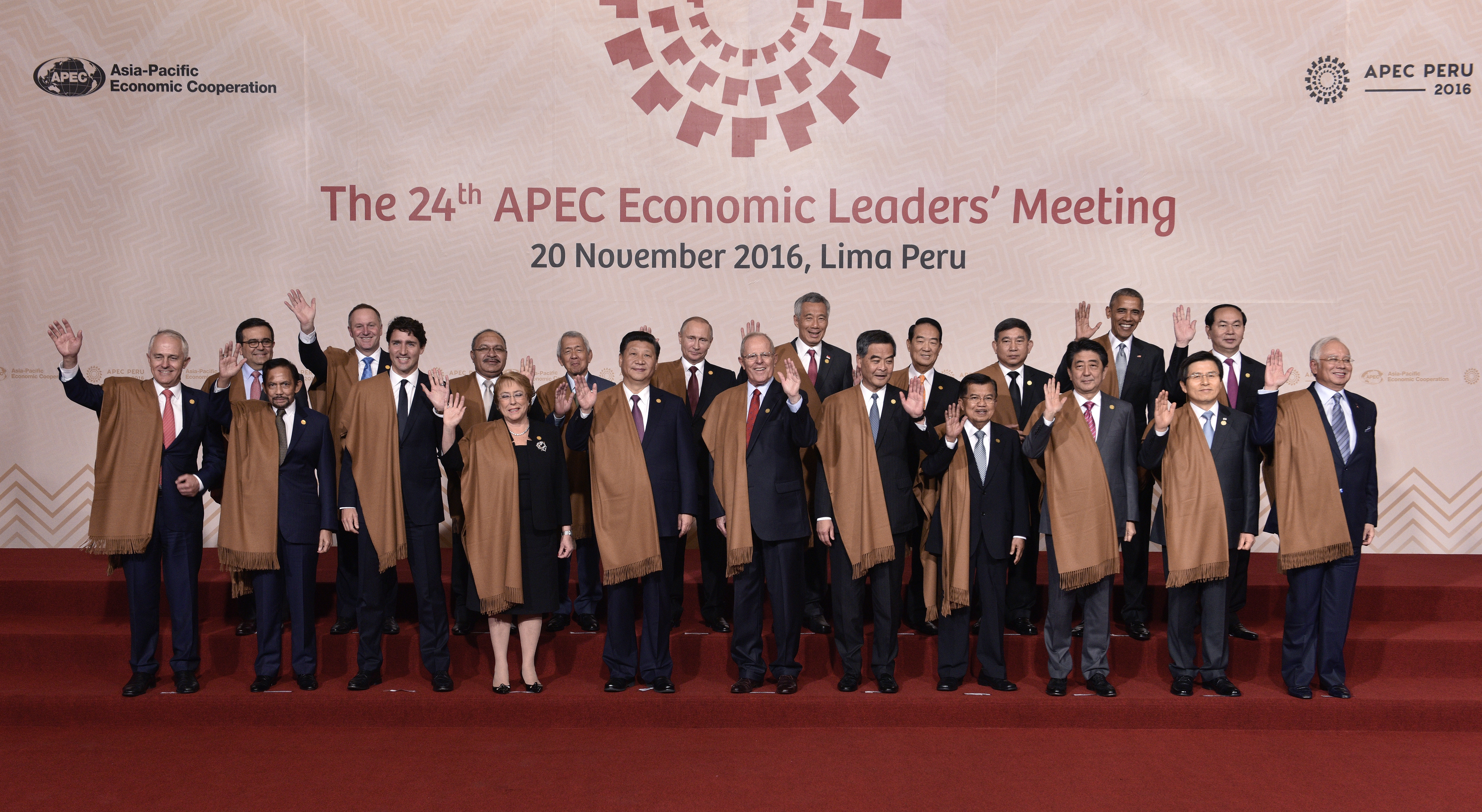
APEC Peru 2016

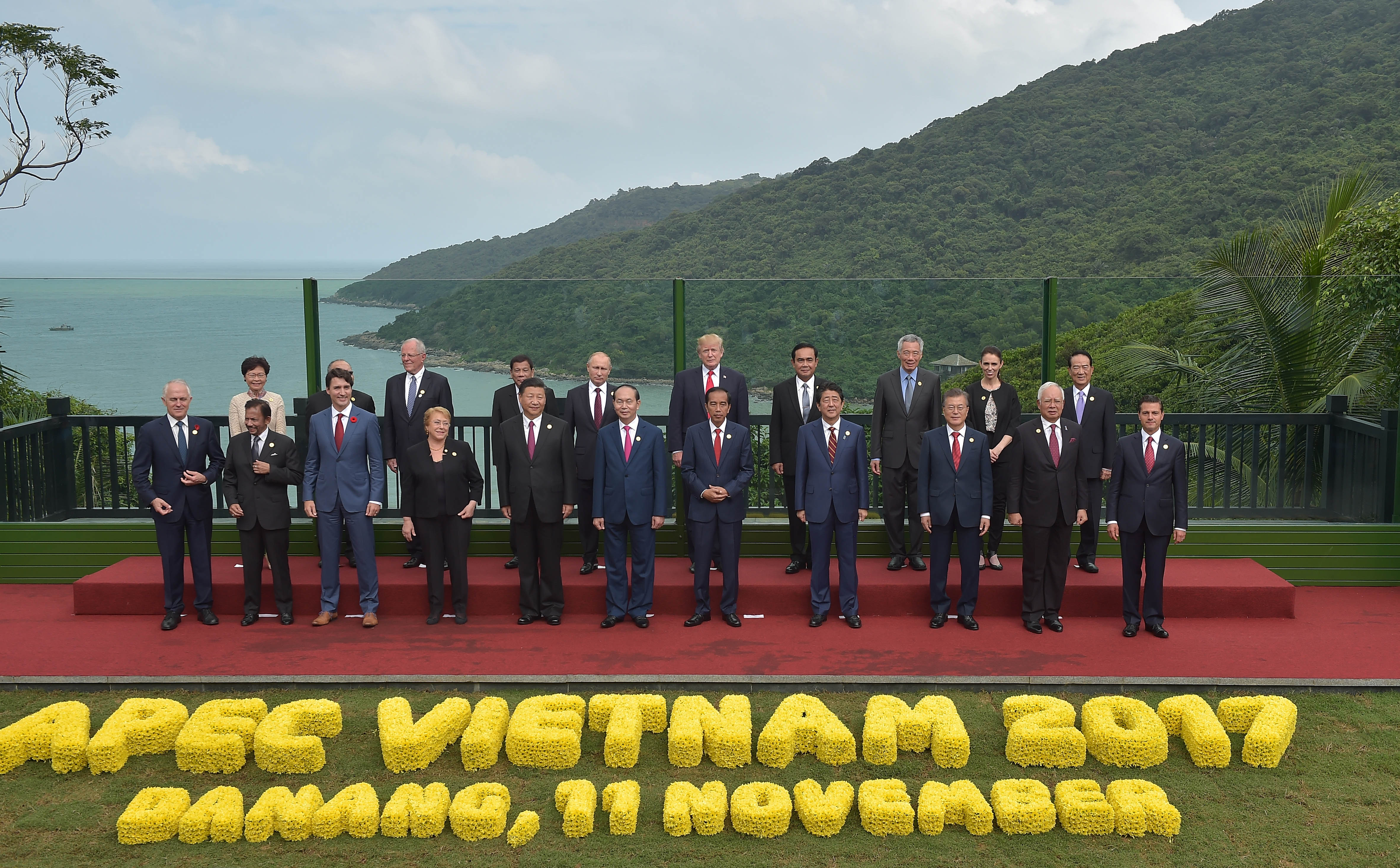
APEC Vietnam 2017

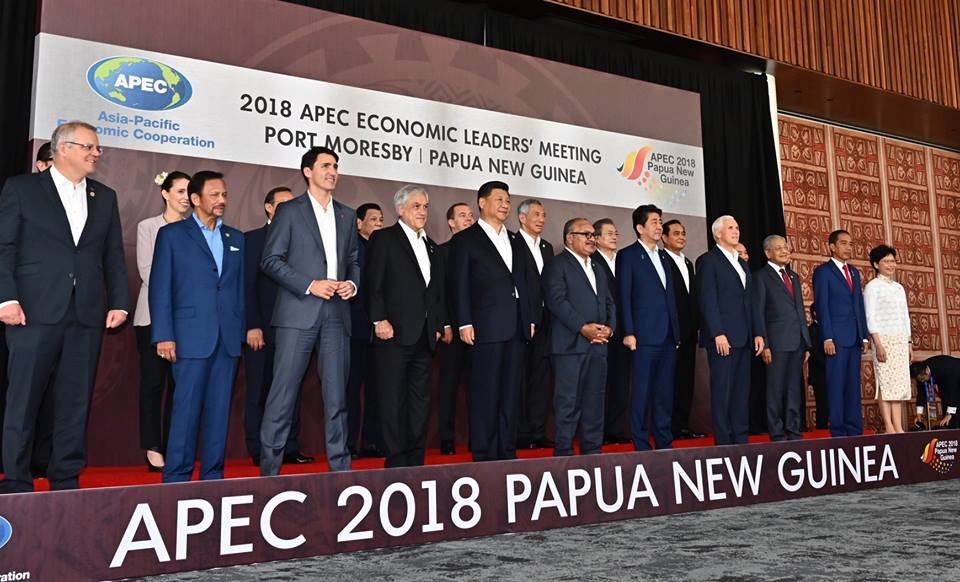
APEC Papua New Guinea 2018

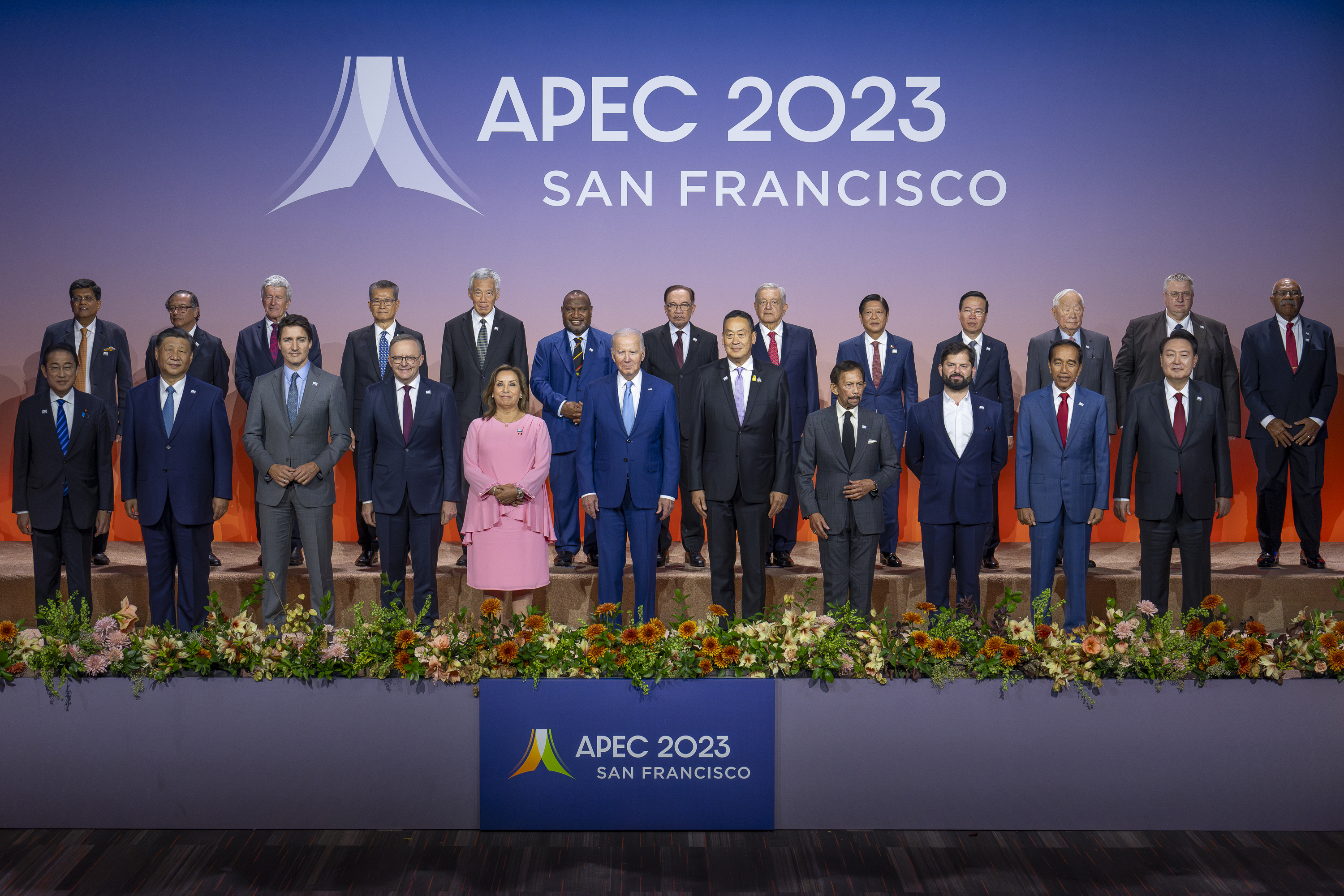
APEC United States 2023

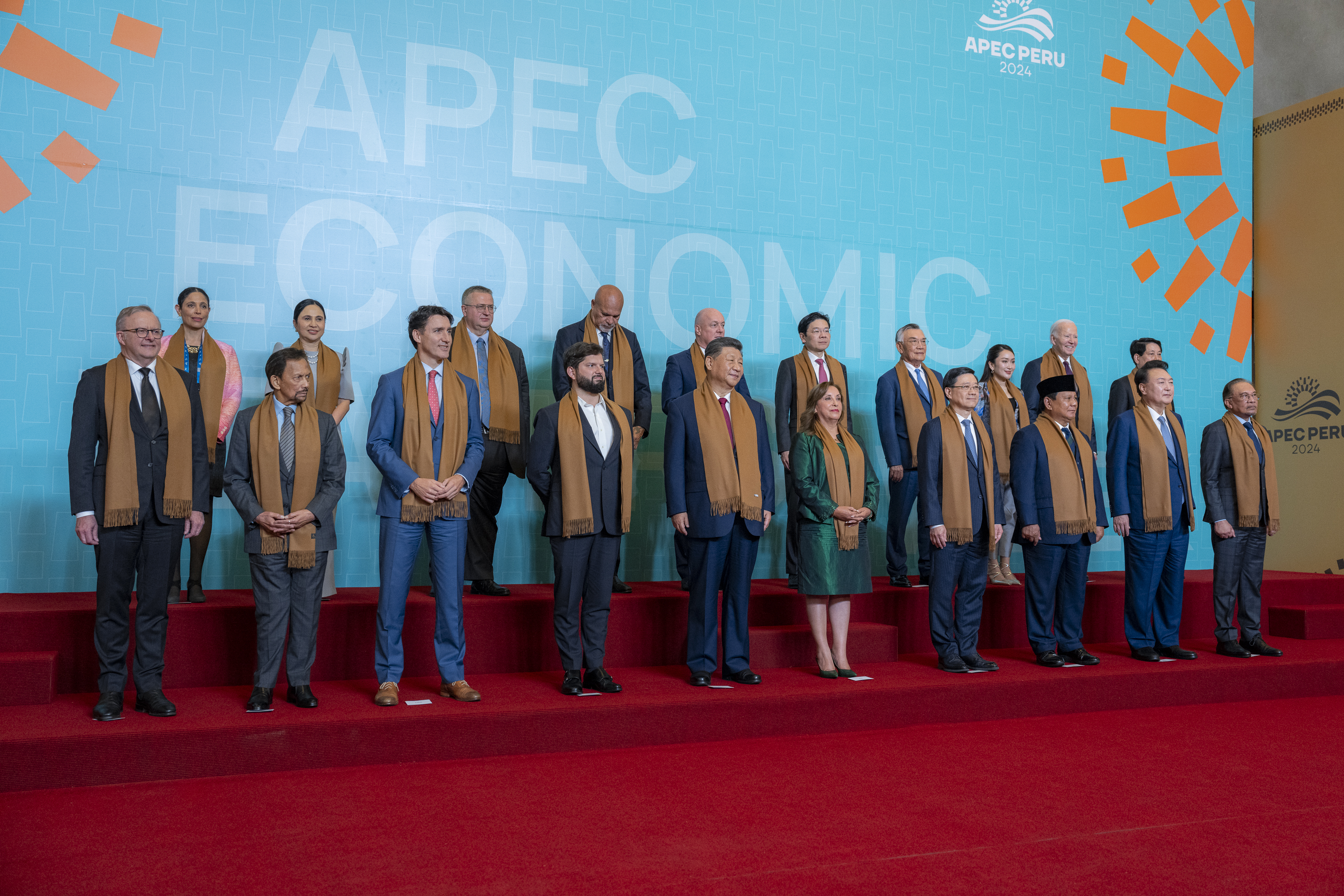
APEC Peru 2024

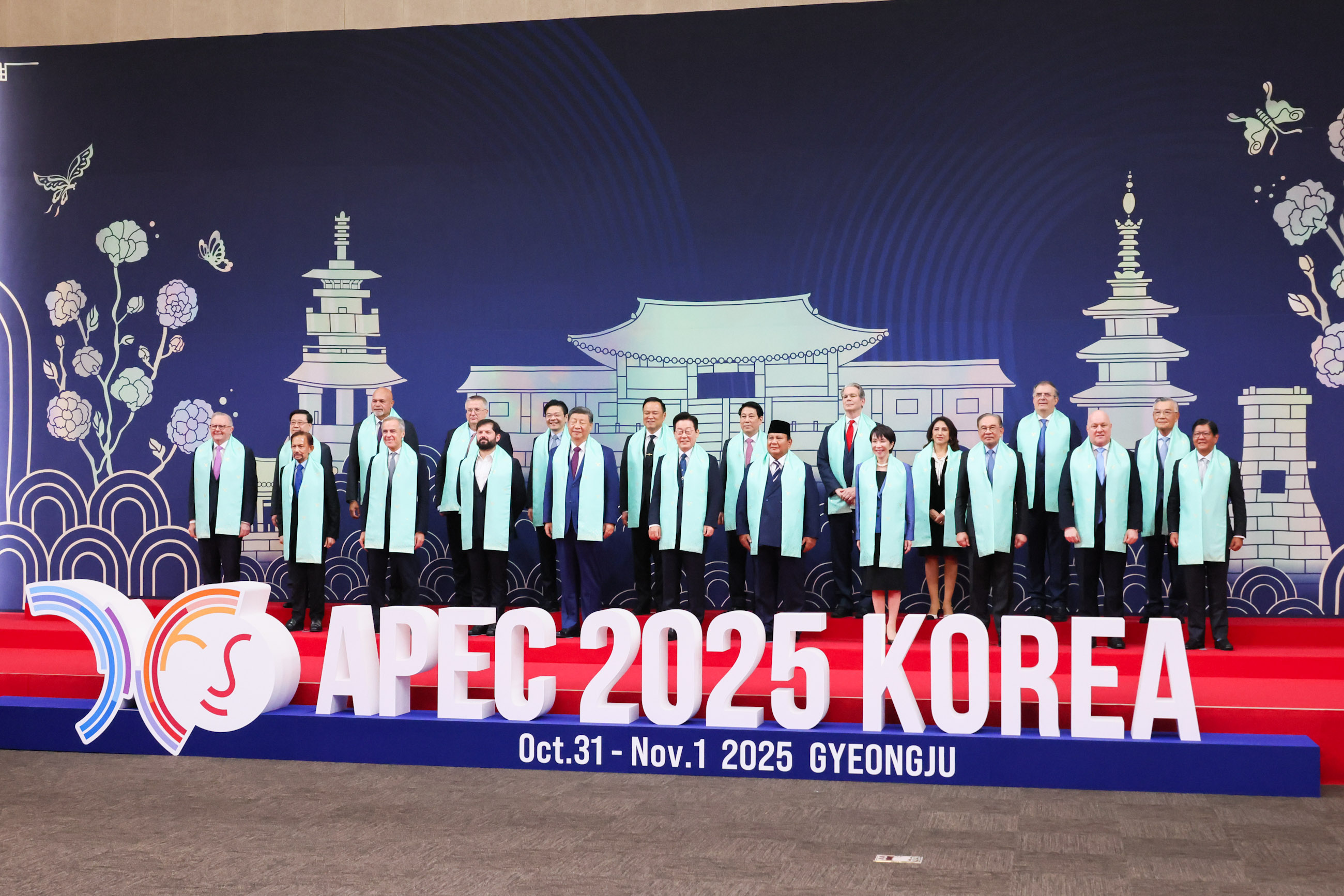
APEC South Korea 2025

APEC China 2026

=== APEC summits ===
- APEC Australia 1989
- APEC Singapore 1990
- APEC South Korea 1991
- APEC Thailand 1992
- APEC United States 1993
- APEC Indonesia 1994
- APEC Japan 1995
- APEC Philippines 1996
- APEC Canada 1997
- APEC Malaysia 1998
- APEC New Zealand 1999
- APEC Brunei 2000
- APEC China 2001
- APEC Mexico 2002
- APEC Thailand 2003
- APEC Chile 2004
- APEC South Korea 2005
- APEC Vietnam 2006
- APEC Australia 2007
- APEC Peru 2008
- APEC Singapore 2009
- APEC Japan 2010
- APEC United States 2011
- APEC Russia 2012
- APEC Indonesia 2013
- APEC China 2014
- APEC Philippines 2015
- APEC Peru 2016
- APEC Vietnam 2017
- APEC Papua New Guinea 2018
- APEC Chile 2019
- APEC Malaysia 2020
- APEC New Zealand 2021
- APEC Thailand 2022
- APEC United States 2023
- APEC Peru 2024
- APEC South Korea 2025
- APEC China 2026
- APEC Vietnam 2027
- APEC Mexico 2028
- APEC Canada 2029
- APEC Singapore 2030
- APEC Japan 2031
- APEC Chile 2032
- APEC Papua New Guinea 2033
- APEC Peru 2034

== Criticism ==
APEC has been criticised for promoting free trade agreements that would impose restrictions on national and local laws, which regulate and ensure labour rights, environmental protection and safe and affordable access to medicine. According to the organisation, it is "the premier forum for facilitating economic growth, cooperation, trade and investment in the Asia-Pacific region" established to "further enhance economic growth and prosperity for the region and to strengthen the Asia-Pacific community". The effectiveness and fairness of its role has been questioned, especially from the viewpoints of European countries that cannot take part in APEC and Pacific Island nations that cannot participate but stand to be affected by its decisions.

== See also ==
- Anti-corruption
- ASEAN Free Trade Area
- Asia-Europe Meeting
- Asia-Pacific Trade Agreements Database
- East Asia Economic Caucus
- East Asia Summit
- List of country groupings
- List of multilateral free-trade agreements
- Pacific Alliance
- Pacific Economic Cooperation Council
- University Mobility in Asia and the Pacific

=== Other organisations of coastal states ===
- Bay of Bengal Initiative
- Black Sea Economic Cooperation
- Indian Ocean Rim Association for Regional Cooperation
- Pacific Alliance
- Shanghai Cooperation Organisation
- Union for the Mediterranean
