= APEC Climate Center =

- APEC 기후센터
- Founded: November 2005
- Purpose: Climate information services, climate change research
- Location: Busan, South Korea
- Region served: Asia-Pacific region
- Website: www.apcc21.org

The APEC Climate Center (APCC) is a governmental institution that conducts research in climate prediction, analysis and climate change application areas. It also provides climate information services and capacity building programs with the aim of strengthening scientific and technological cooperation across the APEC region. APCC was established in the APEC Senior Officials' Meeting held in November 2005. It was formally launched at the APEC Economic Leaders' Meeting in the same year. It is currently located in Busan, South Korea.

== History ==
The forerunner of the APEC Climate Center was the APEC Climate Network (APCN) established by the APEC Industrial Science and Technology Working Group (ISTWG). The Network was established with the aim of exchanging climate information among APEC economies in order to combat climate and weather related disasters. It was proposed during the 16th APEC ISTWG meeting in 1999 by the Korea Meteorological Administration and the network had its first working group meeting in May 2001.

The APCN was initiated to share reliable regional climate information among the economies. The effort was justified in terms of economic rationale. By sharing the information of individual national meteorological institutions, the institutions had received more accurate climate information through the Multi Model ensemble technique, which combine the diverse range of climate information submitted by the institutions to generate more accurate climate information. In order to further develop the technique and to help APEC member economies enhance their climate prediction capabilities through capacity building efforts, it was deemed necessary to create a formal institution. Thus through the discussions held in APEC Science and Technology Ministerial Meeting in 2004, the ISTWG Meeting in 2004 and the Senior Officials’ Meeting in 2005, the establishment of the Center was approved by APEC.

== Activities ==
=== APEC Climate Symposium ===
The APEC Climate Symposium (APCS) is the flagship international event organized by the Center as a forum for research exchange on climate science. It has been held annually since 2006, generally in the host cities of the year's APEC meetings.

Year	Dates	Country	City	Topic
2006	September	South Korea	Busan	Multi Model Ensemble for Climate Prediction
2007	September 18–20	South Korea	Busan	
2008	August 19–21	Peru	Lima	
2009	July 12–15	Singapore	Singapore	Climate Prediction and Applications: Relevance for Climate Adaptation Strategies
2010	June 20–24	South Korea	Busan	Climate Prediction and its Application
2011	October 17–20	United States	Honolulu	Harnessing and Using Climate Information for Agriculture, Water Resource Management and Energy Efficiency
2012	October 8–11	Russia	St Petersburg	Harnessing and Using Climate Information for Decision-Making in Agriculture, Water Resource Management and Energy Efficiency
2013	November 11–13	Indonesia	Jakarta	Regional Cooperation on Drought Prediction Service to Support Disaster Preparedness and Management
2014	November 10–11	China	Nanjing	Managing climate extremes and hydrologic disasters: Scientific prediction and emergency preparedness
2015	November 2–4	Philippines	Manila	Application of Climate and Weather for Effective Disaster Management
2016	September 16–18	Peru	Lima	Smart Climate Information and Accountable Actions: Achieving Sustainable Food Security in a Changing World
2017	TBA	Vietnam	TBA	

== See also ==
- Asia-Pacific Economic Cooperation
