= Extradition law in the Republic of Ireland =

The law of extradition in the Republic of Ireland includes legislation and case law, and gives effect to treaties.

== Extradition Acts 1965 to 2012 ==
The Extradition Acts 1965 to 2012 is the collective title of the Extradition Act 1965, the Extradition (European Convention on the Suppression of Terrorism) Act 1987, the Extradition (Amendment) Act 1987, the Extradition (Amendment) Act 1994, the Extradition (European Union Conventions) Act 2001, and the European Arrest Warrant (Application to Third Countries and Amendment) and Extradition (Amendment) Act 2012.

== Countries and places ==
Countries and places to which Part II of the Extradition Act 1965 applies include Australia, the Hong Kong Special Administrative Region, the Republic of Kosovo, the United States of America, the countries listed in Part A of Schedule 3 to the Extradition (European Convention on Extradition) Order 2019, and, in certain cases, the Federative Republic of Brazil. The extradition treaty with Hong Kong was suspended in 2020.

Part II of the Extradition Act 1965 also applies to certain countries for offences against:

- The Convention on the Prevention and Punishment of Crimes against Internationally Protected Persons, including Diplomatic Agents (1973)
- The Convention on the Physical Protection of Nuclear Material (1979)
- The International Convention against the Taking of Hostages (1979)
- The Convention against Torture and Other Cruel, Inhuman or Degrading Treatment or Punishment (1984)
- The United Nations Convention against Illicit Traffic in Narcotic Drugs and Psychotropic Substances (1988)
- The Convention for the Suppression of Unlawful Acts against the Safety of Maritime Navigation (1988)
- The Protocol for the Suppression of Unlawful Acts against the Safety of Fixed Platforms Located on the Continental Shelf (1988)
- The Convention on the Safety of United Nations and Associated Personnel (1994)
- The Convention on Combating Bribery of Foreign Public Officials in International Business Transactions (1997)
- The International Convention for the Suppression of Terrorist Bombings (1997)
- The Criminal Law Convention on Corruption (1999)
- The International Convention for the Suppression of the Financing of Terrorism (1999)
- The Second Protocol to the Hague Convention for the Protection of Cultural Property in the Event of Armed Conflict (1999)

== Exceptions ==
The exception for political offences includes the concept of connexity.

== History ==
The Extradition Act 1870 was repealed by the Extradition Act 1965.

The Extradition Act 1965 gave effect to the European Convention on Extradition.
