= Extradition law in Israel =

The extradition law of Israel was passed in 1954 and describes the conditions of extradition to other country, and Law for serving a prison sentence in the prisoner's country of citizenship was passed in 1996 and allowing prisoners to serve their sentence in Israel or the country of citizenship. As for today, Israel have signed seven extradition agreements with 55 countries, as it includes the European Convention on Extradition.

Extradition agreements of Israel Israel Countries that have extradition agreement with Israel

== Extradition law ==
The decision to allow extradition is by the Israeli court, the minister of justice, and the attorney general.

Israel will extradite if:

- The extradition request is to prosecute him in the requesting country.
- Double criminality.
- In this law, an extradition offense is any offense that, if committed in Israel, would be punishable by one year in prison or a more severe penalty.
- There is an agreement between the State of Israel and the requesting country regarding the extradition of criminals.
- The person has been charged or convicted in the requesting country for an extraditable offense.
- The principle of reciprocity in extradition relations, unless the minister of justice decides otherwise.

Israel will extradite an Israeli citizen or resident if:

- The extradition request is to prosecute him in the requesting country.
- The country requesting his extradition has committed in advance to transferring him back to the State of Israel to serve his sentence there, if he is convicted and sentenced to prison. The sentenced can request to serve his sentence in the requesting country.
- Double criminality.
- In this law, an extradition offense is any offense that, if committed in Israel, would be punishable by one year in prison or a more severe penalty.
- There is an agreement between the State of Israel and the requesting country regarding the extradition of criminals.
- The person has been charged or convicted in the requesting country for an extraditable offense.
- The principle of reciprocity in extradition relations, unless the minister of justice decides otherwise.

Israel will not extradite if:

- The requested person is requested on political grounds, racial or religion discrimination. (Exceptions to extradite person even on political grounds: any type of murder or causing death, sex offenses, kidnapping or hostage-taking, causing damage to property with the intent to endanger life, Preparation or possession of a weapon, explosive or other destructive substance)
- The requested person could face death penalty in the requesting country. unless the requesting country has committed that he will not be given the death penalty.
- The requested person is military or security personnel, or in case the extradition could harm the public policy or the interests of the State of Israel.
- The requested person has stood trial in Israel for the offense for which his extradition is requested, and has been found guilty or not.
- The requested person was convicted in another country of an offense for which his extradition is requested, and served his sentence or the remaining part of it in Israel.
- The offense has become statute-barred.
- The extradition request was submitted due to an offense for which the requested party received amnesty or pardon in the requesting country.
- The requested person could be extradited to a third country.

== Extradition agreements ==
| Countries that have extradition agreement with Israel | Year of agreement | Agreements |
|---|---|---|
| Australia | 3 January 1976 | |
| Brazil | 11 November 2009 | |
| Canada | 10 March 1967 | |
| Council of Europe Members: Albania; Moldova; Armenia; Austria; Azerbaijan; Belgium; Bosnia and Herzegovina; Bulgaria; Croatia; Cyprus; Czech Republic; Denmark; Estonia; Finland; France; Georgia; Germany; Greece; Hungary; Iceland; Ireland; Italy; Latvia; Liechtenstein; Lithuania; Luxembourg; Malta; Moldova; Monaco; Montenegro; Netherlands; North Macedonia; Norway; Poland; Portugal; Romania; San Marino; Serbia; Slovakia; Slovenia; Spain; Sweden; Switzerland; Turkey; Ukraine; United Kingdom; Other signed and ratified countries: South Africa; South Korea | 26 December 1967 | |
| Eswatini | 24 July 1970 | |
| Fiji | 21 December 1979 | |
| United States | 5 December 1963 | |
