= Extradition law in Nigeria =

Nigeria is held by treaty to cooperate in extradition of criminals with several nations.

== United States ==
The extradition Treaty signed between the United States and other countries allows the United States to request from countries that have signed the Extradition Treaty to extradite persons who are wanted by the United States Security Authorities for criminal offences. Nigeria signed the Extradition Treaty with the United States on 22 December 1931 and entered into force on 24 June 1935.

Since then Nigeria has extradited several persons to the United States for various reasons ranging from drug, advance fee fraud, and terrorism related offenses. On 28 August 2013 a court in Nigeria on the request of the U.S. Embassy ordered the extradition to the US one Lawal Olaniyi Babafemi's on a federal indictment charging him for providing support to al-Qaida in the Arabian Peninsula by recruiting members to train in Yemen.

A recent incidence involving Senator-elect Buruji Kashamu, 56, who was on Monday, 25 May 2015, refused to attend a court hearing on his extradition to the United States on 20-year-old drug charges related to the TV hit "Orange is the New Black.” After years of inaction, the United States has requested his extradition, according to Nigeria's drug agency. A U.S. State Department official told The Associated Press that the department does not comment on law enforcement matters.

There is no public record showing the extradition of United States citizens to Nigeria since the treaty became effective in 1935. Despite being the party benefiting more from the treaty, the State Department in a 2009 report described Nigeria's extradition practices and procedures as an obstacle to anti-crime efforts. The report states that the US has several extradition requests pending in Nigeria for years.

== United Kingdom ==
The Hon. Attorney General of the Federation and Minister of Justice applied to the Federal High Court in Abuja to order the extradition of Mr Emmanuel Okoyomon and on 4 May 2015 the Court ordered that Emmanuel Okoyomon, former Managing Director Nigerian Security Printing and Minting Company (NSPM) be extradited to the United Kingdom (UK) for trial for alleged corruption and money laundering. The court gave the Federal Government 30 days within which to extradite Okoyomon to the UK.
