= Charles Steiner =

Charles Steiner may refer to:

- Charles Zentai (1921–2017), born Károly Steiner, Hungarian-Australian accused of war crimes
- Charley Steiner (born 1949), US sportscaster
