= European Investigation Order =

A European Investigation Order (EIO) is a mechanism established under EU law by which a judge or magistrate in one EU member state can make a binding request to the law enforcement agencies of another member state to collect evidence to assist in a criminal investigation. The order may authorise such actions as searches, wiretapping, surveillance, the subpoena of documents or records, etc. The mechanism exists throughout the EU, with the exception of Denmark and Ireland, who have opt-outs in this area of EU law. The EIO was established by Directive 2014/41/EU of the European Parliament and of the Council of 3 April 2014 regarding the European Investigation Order in criminal matters.

== Rationale ==
In considering the European Investigation Order it is important to examine why it exists and the rationale for adding yet another investigative measure to the existing cross-border investigative measures. Prior to the EIO there was Council Framework Decision 2003/577/JHA and this pertained to the mutual recognition of freezing orders for the purpose of securing evidence or subsequent confiscation of property. The issue with this framework decision, however, was that there would need to be a separate request for the transferring of evidence to the issuing state. There was also Council Framework Decision 2008/978/JHA which pertained to the European Evidence Warrant. This instrument allowed for the mutual recognition of judicial orders issued for the sake of obtaining objects, documents and data in order for them to be used in criminal proceedings. The issue with this measure was that it only applied to already existing evidence and thus had a limited scope, outside of which the only measure available was the mutual legal assistance Procedure. The result of these framework decisions was that the framework for collecting evidence was fragmented and complex. This fragmentation was discussed at the Stockholm Program by the European Council in 2009 where it was decided that there needed to be a comprehensive system based on mutual recognition for obtaining evidence in cross-border criminal cases. The answer to this fragmentation was thus the EIO. The EIO replaced prior instruments in the area of judicial cooperation in criminal matters, namely Framework Decisions 2003/577/JHA and 2008/978/JHA. The EIO aim is to facilitate and increase efficiency in cross-border criminal investigations by simplifying the process of evidence collection to combat transnational crime.

== Use ==
The EIO is based on mutual recognition of judgements and judicial decisions concerning criminal matters as defined by Article 82(1) TFEU. Mutual recognition has become the pillar of judicial cooperation in criminal matters and allows judgements or judicial decisions from other Member States to have the same level of force and effect as national jurisprudence, even if there is no prior recognition or recognition process. Thereby, the enforcing state can be confident that the requesting authority has already verified the legality, necessity and proportionality of the requested measures. Consequently, the principle requires Member States to recognize and execute EIOs from other Member States without re-evaluating the case on its merits.

The EIO may be issued in relation to four types of proceedings:

− Criminal proceedings by a judicial authority pertaining to a criminal offense under the national law of the state issuing the EIO;

− Proceedings brought by an administrative authority or;

− Proceedings brought by a judicial authority for acts punishable under the national law of the state issuing the EIO where the infringement gives rise to proceedings in front of a court having jurisdiction in criminal matters.

− An EIO can be issued in relation to the first three types of proceedings which relate to offenses or infringements where a legal person can be held liable and punished in the issuing state.

The EIO can serve as a less intrusive alternative for issuing a prosecution EAW. On the basis of an EAW, the defendant could be heard in the executing Member State, for instance by way of video conference, instead of surrendering them to the issuing Member States. For some investigative measures, Member States may require double criminality. However, as with the EAW, verification of double criminality is excluded when the EIO concerns a listed offence. An important improvement of the EIO is the express provision that the defendant has the right to request the issuing of an EIO (for example, an EIO for hearing a defence witness in another Member State.) It must be pointed out, however, that EIO cannot be used for cross-border surveillance for the purpose of transfer of criminal proceedings.

== Implementation challenges ==
The inception of the EIO has led to somewhat of an uproar in the academic and legal communities. There has been some staple critique that the EIO is a prosecutorial instrument that does not afford a high standard of protection to human rights. Some even went as far as arguing that the EIO’s inception was hasty, as it did not allow for experiences to be drawn from the European Arrest Warrant, and some said it was a patchwork solution in a fragmented frame of mutual recognition. The main rule under article 21(1) is that the executing state shall bear all the costs of carrying out an EIO for the issuing state. The underlying rationale is that costs operate based on a principle of reciprocity. However, certain countries are in a position where they execute much more EIOs than they issue, and certain countries may be tasked with carrying out a large scope investigation. Article 21(2) only suggest that Member States may consult how to share the costs or modify the EIO if the former is exceptionally high.

There are some human rights challenges as well. Article 1(3) of the directive stipulates that the issuing of an EIO may be requested by a suspect, accused or a lawyer on his behalf. However, not all member states have implemented the directive to allow suspects/accused/their lawyers to request the issuing of an EIO for evidence in another country. This raises a challenge against the equality of arms which is guaranteed by the European Convention of Human Rights as a component of a fair trial. Article 4 of the Directive stipulates the type of proceedings for which an EIO could be issued, which includes administrative proceedings. This is problematic with regards to the rule of speciality, as an issuing state may request evidence for an administrative offence in the executing country but use it for criminal proceedings. The grounds of non-recognition or non-execution are laid out in Article 11 of the Directive are limited and are the basis on which an executing state may refuse an EIO. This applies to the ne bis in idem rule among other things.

Another disparity of the right of the defence regards the right to, in an immediate and direct manner, challenge the issuing of an EIO. This right was not inherent when the Directive was drafted or went into force. Through interpretations and guidance by Eurojust, clarifications have been made over the years. However, when asked questions in a preliminary ruling of the Gavanozov case in 2019, the Court avoided answering regarding the direct legal status of suspects. In this case, The Bulgarian domestic court requested another preliminary ruling on this issue, which was delivered on 11 November 2021. In this decision, the Court explained the articles in accordance with ECtHR case law and the EU Charter of Fundamental Rights. The inability to challenge the necessity and legality of a European Investigation Order carrying out searches and seizures in the issuing Member State constitutes a breach of Article 47 of the Charter. The issuing State must at least provide the opportunity to challenge the legality of the issued EIO at some stage in the investigation process. This possibility must both include review of the lawfulness of the measure instigated and the manner in which it was carried out. The issuing of EIOs will be disallowed when this minimum level of protection for the accused cannot be ensured by its national laws. The Court thus follows the recommendation given by the Advocate General Michal Bobek, who in this case advised that as long as the Bulgarian legislature does not remedy this situation, Bulgaria is in constant breach of fundamental rights and can therefore not take part in the mutual recognition scheme.

A further issue concerns the rights of the defence. It is not clear what the consequences are of any illegality in the execution of an EIO for the proceedings in the issuing member state, especially when the rights of the defence were not respected in the execution of an EIO, (for example, when the defendant is not able to question an incriminating witness.)

Subsequent, the Court of Justice has further clarified the relationship between the EIO and the rights of the defence. In M.N. (EncroChat) (C - 670/22), the Court considered EIOs issued by German authorities for the transmission of encrypted telecommunications data that had already been obtained by French authorities. The Court held that an EIO requesting the transmission of evidence already in the possession of the executing State may, under certain conditions, be issued by a public prosecutor, even where the conditions applicable to the gathering of that evidence in the issuing Stae have not been satisfied. However, compliance with the fundamental rights of the persons concerned must remain subject to subsequent judicial review. Another question addessed by the Court is the use of evidence obtained through an EIO. Under Art. 14(7) of the Directive 2014/41, national criminal courts must disregard information where accused person is not in a position to comment effectively on it and where that information is likely to have a preponderant influence on the findings of the fact. The judgement therefore links the mutual recognition framework for cross border evidence with procedural safeguards concerning the accused's ability to challenge evidence. Consequently, this judgement helps to clarify this issue by stressing that the accused must have an effcetive opportunity to challenge important evidence.

== History ==
The Directive was proposed in April 2010, by a group of seven European Union Member States: Austria, Bulgaria, Belgium, Estonia, Slovenia, Spain and Sweden. The EIO would replace the existing legal framework applicable to the gathering and transfer of evidence between the member states. It proposed a procedure that would allow an authority in one member state (the "issuing authority") to request specific criminal investigative measures be carried out by an authority in another member state (the "executing authority"). The measure is based on the principle of mutual recognition established in article 82(1) of the TFEU. Article 82(1) stipulates that judicial cooperation in criminal matters within the European Union shall be based upon the mutual recognition of judgements and judicial decisions.

The EIO contained several significant innovations over existing procedures. The EIO focuses on the investigative measure to be executed, rather than on the type of evidence to be gathered. The EIO has a broad scope – all investigative measures are covered, except those explicitly excluded. In principle, the issuing authority decides on the type of investigative measure to be used. However, flexibility is introduced by allowing, in a limited number of cases, the executing authority to decide to have recourse to an investigative measure other than that provided for in the EIO. Clear time limits are provided for the recognition and, with more flexibility, for the execution of the EIO. The proposal also innovates by providing the legal obligation to execute the EIO with the same celerity and priority as for a similar national case. The EIO provides for the use of a form that should be used in all cases.

Compared to the European Evidence Warrant and to mutual legal assistance, the EIO provides for rationalisation of the grounds for refusal, and the right of the issuing authority to request that one or several of its officials assist in the execution of the measure in the executing State.

In August 2010 the European Commission issued an opinion on the initiative, warning that it may be a system of evidence sharing without the safeguards provided by common admissibility standards. In its opinion, the European Commission noted the advantages of the proposal – a simpler, unified system – if the system was backed by the appropriate procedural and fundamental rights standards. At the time of the adoption of the opinion, Viviane Reding, the EU Justice Commissioner said that she would "ensure that the proposal respects the EU Charter of Fundamental Rights."

A general approach on the draft text was reached at the meeting of the Council in December 2011, allowing the Council to negotiate with the European Parliament for the adoption of the measure. The rapporteur in the European Parliament was Nuno Melo of the European People's Party.

Before the approval of the EIO could be considered by the European Parliament and EU Council, it was criticised by Fair Trials International, the Fundamental Rights Agency, Statewatch and some UK parliamentarians, who fear that it will allow increased police surveillance and disproportionate use of investigative powers in trivial matters.

The directive was adopted in 2014.

== See also ==
- European Arrest Warrant
