= Extradition (Amendment) Act 1994 =

The Extradition (Amendment) Act, 1994 (An Act To Amend and Extend the Extradition Acts, 1965 to 1987) was an act passed by the Oireachtas, the national legislature of Ireland. The Act restricted the use of the defence of 'political offence' by defendants against extradition.
