= Extradition law in the Philippines =

Countries (in red) that have signed extradition treaties or Transfer of Sentenced Persons Agreement with the Philippines (in blue)

Extradition in the Philippines may come into effect when the Philippine government and a foreign government sign an agreement through a treaty to be ratified by both parties. Extradition in the Philippines is regulated by a combination of national laws, including relevant provisions of the Criminal Procedure Code and specific statutes, as well as international agreements. The process begins when a foreign government submits a formal request to extradite a suspect or convicted individual to the Department of Foreign Affairs of the Philippines.

== Countries ==
=== Extradition in force ===
These are thirteen contracts (twelve countries and one administrative region) that constitute signed extradition treaties to the Philippines and have taken effect by ratification:

Country	Transfer of Sentenced Persons Agreement (TSPA)	Extradition agreement	Date Treaty Signed (TSPA)	Date Treaty Ratified (TSPA)	Date Treaty Signed (Extradition)	Date Treaty Ratified (Extradition)
Australia	No	Yes	-	-	March 7, 1988	January 18, 1991
Canada	No	Yes	-	-	November 7, 1989	November 12, 1990
China	No	Yes	-	-	October 30, 2001	April 11, 2006
Hong Kong	Yes	Yes	April 28, 2000	June 15, 2002	January 30, 1995	June 20, 1997
India	No	Yes	-	-	March 12, 2004	October 12, 2015
Indonesia	No	Yes	-	-	February 10, 1976	October 25, 1976
Spain	Yes	Yes	May 18, 2007	December 28, 2007	March 2, 2004	April 24, 2014
Thailand	Yes	Yes	October 12, 2001	May 7, 2002	March 16, 1981	December 7, 1984
Russia	No	Yes	-	-	November 13, 2017	December 18, 2019
South Korea	No	Yes	-	-	May 25, 1993	November 30, 1996
Switzerland	No	Yes	-	-	October 19, 1989	February 23, 1997
United Kingdom	No	Yes	October 26, 2023	-	September 18, 2009	April 14, 2014
United States	No	Yes	-	-	November 13, 1994	November 22, 1996

=== Extradition in planning ===
As of 2014, the Philippines has proposed or pending extradition negotiations with Austria, Belgium, Brazil, France, Iran, Israel, Jamaica, Peru, Saudi Arabia, United Arab Emirates, Venezuela and Vietnam.

== See also ==
- Extradition law in the United States
- Extradition law in Australia
- Department of Foreign Affairs (Philippines)
