= Political offence exception =

Extradition proviso

A political offence exception (or exemption) is a provision which limits the obligation of a sovereign state under an extradition or mutual legal assistance treaty or statute. Such provisions allow the state whose assistance has been requested ("the requested party") to refuse to hand over a suspect to – or to gather evidence on behalf of – another state ("the requesting party"), if the requested party's competent authority determines that the requesting party seeks assistance in order to prosecute an offence of a political character.

== History ==
=== Origins ===
The concept of an exception for political offences is a very new idea compared to the concept of extradition itself, and indeed constitutes an almost complete reversal of the original purpose of extradition. The earliest treaties for handing over criminal suspects from one country to another, dating from the 13th century BC, were aimed exclusively at fugitives who had committed political or religious crimes. Sovereigns made little effort towards the recapture of common criminals who had fled their jurisdiction, but actively pursued political criminals, to the extent of requesting aid from other sovereigns.

After the French Revolution, international attitudes towards the extradition of political offenders began a slow shift. In 1833, Belgium became the first country to legislate a prohibition against the extradition of political offenders (section 6 of the Loi du 1^{er} octobre 1833 sur les extraditions), and included such a prohibition in its extradition treaty with France the following year. France itself began including such exceptions in its extradition treaties with various other countries over the several decades that followed. France began to include the political offence exception in its treaties later that year; the United States followed suit starting in 1843, and England in 1852. Belgium, as the first country to codify a political offence exception to extradition, was also a pioneer in efforts to define the outer limits of what exactly constitutes a "political offence". In what is now known as the clause d'attentat or the clause Belge, Belgium excluded from the definition of "political offence" crimes committed against the life of a head of state or head of government after having to refuse to extradite two persons who attempted to assassinate Napoleon III.

=== Narrowing the scope ===
Throughout the twentieth century, world events forced governments to examine the concept of the political offence exception more closely, first in the 1920s and 1930s as clashing fascists and communists used methods that could be described in modern parlance as terrorism to promote their respective political aims, then after World War II as both war criminals and collaborators with occupation governments sought with much success to protect themselves behind the shield of political offence exceptions, and further into the 1960s and 1970s with members of national liberation and anti-colonialist movements whose proponents acclaimed them as freedom fighters while detractors labelled them terrorists. The result was an increasingly common limitation, in addition to the clause Belge, that acts prohibited by multilateral treaties are not subject to the political offence exception.

Various international conventions attempted to exclude consideration of motivation for certain crimes, with mixed success. The Hague Hijacking Convention of 1970 was an early example of this. It sought to correct the failure of the earlier Tokyo Convention to mandate prosecution or extradition for aircraft hijacking. Though the Hague Convention did not explicitly force signatories to exclude aircraft hijacking as a political offence, as it was believed at the time that this would inhibit the adoption of the convention, it was a step in the direction towards promoting uniform international practice. China does not apply the principle of non-extradition for political offences in case of crimes of aircraft hijacking and other offences against civil aviation safety. The United States regards the Hague Hijacking Convention as "forbidding any inquiry" into an offender's political motivation. An early draft of the 1973 Protection of Diplomats Convention attempted to take a stronger step in prohibiting consideration of an alleged offender's motives, but this language was deleted from the final version of the treaty.

The 1977 European Convention on the Suppression of Terrorism was more successful at limiting the scope of the political offence exception; in its first article, it provided a long list of offences which could not be regarded as political offences, including not just the traditional clause d'attentat, but also kidnapping, hostage taking, and the use of bombs and firearms where the use endangered lives. Article 13 permits contracting states to register reservations to Article 1 and thus to preserve their domestic law political offence exceptions, but, for example, the United Kingdom elected not to do so. Article 11 of the International Convention for the Suppression of Terrorist Bombings also provided that offences covered by that convention could not be regarded as political offences for the purpose of refusing an extradition request. The 2004 implementation of the European Arrest Warrant system entirely removed the political offence exception to extradition among member states of the European Union.

== Major legal tests ==
=== Absolute or relative offences ===
Political offences have been divided into two groups. Absolute or pure political offences are offences which are directed against the political organization or government of the state and contain no element of a common crime at all. Pure political offences include crimes such as treason, espionage, and sedition. In most cases, there is no duty to extradite for pure political offences, and there is agreement that the political offence exception applies to these offences.

More difficult is the situation of a relative political offence in which a common crime is committed in connection with a political act. Several different legal tests have been developed to determine when the political offence exception applies.

=== Political incidence test ===
The political incidence test looks to whether the offence is "part of and incidental to a political struggle". Initially, it did not concern itself with the motives of the offender. English courts first developed this test in the 1891 case In re Castioni, (Note: In re Castioni, [1891] 1 Q.B. 149.) in which Switzerland sought the extradition of a man from Bellinzona who had shot dead a government official during political unrest there. The Extradition Act 1870 provided in general language for an exception to extradition for offences of a political character or offences for which extradition is sought to punish the offender for a political action, but the Act did not define those terms in detail. Judge George Denman formulated the two legs of the test for offences of a political character: first that the offence occurred during a political disturbance, and second that the offence was an overt act part of or incidental to the disturbance, and so ruled that Castolini could not be extradited.

Later cases looked to the motives of the offender in an effort to determine whether the offences could fall under a more liberal definition of "political disturbance". In the 1954 case Ex parte Kolczynski, (Note: R v Governor of Brixton Prison, Ex parte Kolczynski, [1954] 1 Q.B. 540.) English courts first extended the political incidence test to events that were not part of political unrest: a revolt by seven Polish sailors who mutinied against their captain and took their ship to the United Kingdom. Judges James Cassels and Rayner Goddard interpreted "political disturbance" far more broadly than in Castolini, finding even in the absence of an uprising that the offenders' crimes had been committed as part of efforts to avoid prosecution for political crimes. The case has been described as "the farthest extension" of the political offence exception. In 1962, the next major case in this regard, Schtraks v Israel, (Note: Schtraks v Government of Israel and Others, [1964] AC 556, [1962] 3 All ER 529, [1962] 3 WLR 1013. Available here at the website of the United Nations High Commissioner for Refugees.) Lord Radcliffe laid down the outer limits of what could constitute a "political disturbance" under the liberal Kolczynski definition, finding that it required that "the fugitive is at odds with the state that applies for his extradition on some issue connected with the political control or government of the country". The court found that while Schtraks' alleged offence of kidnapping his nephew to ensure that he had an Orthodox Jewish education was a matter of political controversy in Israel, he had done it purely for personal motivations without any intention of furthering political change, and so found that his offence was not of a political character.

=== Injured rights test and motives test ===
The injured rights test, also known as the objective test, is a primarily French test that looks to whether the offence was directed against the political organisation of the requesting state. This test explicitly rejects the approach that political sentiments behind an offence make it a political offence. This was the test adopted in the Gatti case, in which a San Marino man murdered a local communist and then fled to France. The French court certified his extraditability, ruling that his offence was not a political offence. French courts frequently applied this test in cases in which Belgium sought the extradition of Belgian World War II collaborators, none of whom were extradited.

However, French courts have also adopted the opposite approach and considered only the motives of the offender to the exclusion of the political aims of the act. Under this test, an offence is deemed to be political where the offender demonstrates to the court that they "acted with a political motive". One application of this test was in 1975, when a French court considered the case of two Americans who had hijacked a plane, among whom one had demanded it fly to Hanoi; against the background of the Vietnam War, the court saw this as a politically motivated act.

=== Predominance test ===
Also known as the preponderance or proportionality test, or simply the "Swiss test", this test weighs "the elements of common crime" against the offender's "political motive or purpose", allowing the political offence exception only in cases where the latter outweighs the former. As summarised in Ktir v. Ministere Public Federal, a 1961 case in which Switzerland certified the extraditability to France of an Algerian National Liberation Front member, the test looks to whether the act was "inspired by political passion, "committed in the framework of a struggle for power or for the purpose of escaping a dictatorial authority", and "directly and closely related to the political purpose". As part of the last leg, the court examined the proportionality of the alleged offence. The preponderance test enjoys the most acceptance among academics, and academic sources have suggested that wider adoption of the preponderance test could aid in addressing some of the issues under the incidence test, such as perceived abuse of the political offence exception by former government officials. The Supreme Court of the Netherlands also applied the proportionality test in the 1978 case Folkerts v Public Prosecutor to order the extradition of a Red Army Faction member to West Germany.

=== Connexity test ===
Some sources regarded the Republic of Ireland's approach to the political offence exception as a new test in its own right, while others see it as simply a variation or combination of existing theories. It is sometimes called the "connexity test"; the result is that the definition of political offence may include an ordinary crime which is connected to another's political offence.

This test goes back to the 1973 case Bourke v. Attorney General, (Note: Bourke v. Attorney General, [1972] I.R. 36.) in which the United Kingdom sought extradition from Ireland of Sean Bourke, who had escaped from a British prison with a fellow prisoner. The political offence exception came into play because the fellow prisoner was Soviet spy George Blake. Bourke was never a communist and had aided Blake's escape purely from motivations of the friendship they had forged while imprisoned together. Nevertheless, Bourke's counsel argued that his offence was "an offence connected with a political offence" and thus exempt from extradition under the Irish Extradition Act 1965. The Supreme Court of Ireland rejected the Attorney General's contention that the connected offence itself had to be a political offence; it based that opinion on the fact that the 1965 Act did not contain any limitation on the character of the connected offence, and that the preparatory notes for the European Convention on Extradition which had heavily influenced the 1965 Act showed that the parties to the convention had explicitly rejected that limitation.

== By jurisdiction ==
=== Mainland China ===
The first extradition treaty signed by the government of China, with Thailand, provided for a political offence exception; however, other treaties did not. Instead, the intention was that the executive branch would use the grant of political asylum to the offender under Article 32(2) of the Constitution of China as the reason for rejecting the extradition request. This is the approach followed in the treaties with Belarus, Bulgaria, Kazakhstan, Kyrgyzstan, Russia, and Ukraine.

=== Hong Kong ===
Under Articles 8 of the Basic Law, the English common law that was in form at the time of the handover in 1997 remain as the law of Hong Kong unless they either contravene the Basic Law or have been amended by the Legislative Council, and decisions of English courts before the handover have high authority within Hong Kong.

Under Fugitive Offenders Ordinance (Cap. 503) § 5, both the judiciary of Hong Kong and the Chief Executive are empowered to determine that an offence is "of a political character" and thus that a person should not be surrendered. It was a matter of some debate among Hong Kong and mainland scholars whether or not Hong Kong's agreement with mainland China regarding the cross-boundary surrender of fugitive offenders should also include a political offence exception. Since the 1997 transfer of sovereignty over Hong Kong, Hong Kong and mainland China are both part of the same country, and opponents of adding a political offence exception argued that it was only meant to apply among different sovereigns and not different territories of the same sovereign. One example given in this regard was the arrangement among the states of the United States, in particular the Extradition Clause which contains no exception for political offences and specifically names treason as a crime for which an interstate fugitive must be delivered upon demand. However, proponents of adding a political offence exception argued that the principle of one country, two systems meant that Hong Kong should have the right not to surrender fugitive offenders for political offences, and to prosecute such offences under laws it passes on its own.

Evidence Ordinance (Cap. 8) § 77B provides that Hong Kong courts are not empowered to assist in obtaining evidence for criminal proceedings in an overseas court "in the case of criminal proceedings of a political character". A major case in this regard is Crown Solicitor v Kitingan. (Note: Crown Solicitor v Datuk Dr Jeffrey Kitingan HCMP 1193/1990, [1994] HKCFI 204; [1994] 1 HKC 516.) In that case, the government of Malaysia had arrested Sabah politician Jeffrey Kitingan and laid seven corruption-related charges against him, and sought to obtain evidence from five witnesses in Hong Kong. In May 1993, Judge Clare-Marie Beeson refused, ruling that the proceedings against Kitingan were "of a political character" and that the request was an abuse of process. The Crown appealed to the High Court of Justice, where Judge Nigel Jones upheld Beeson's decision. He ruled that while the burden of proof was on the applicant to demonstrate that the offence was of a political character, Kitingan had met that burden; Jones rejected a challenge to the evidence of an expert witness adduced on Kitingan's behalf that the Malaysian government was conducting "a political campaign directed against" Kitingan and other Parti Bersatu Sabah leaders. He followed the approach in English extradition cases, finding that Kitingan was – as Lord Radcliffe had defined the important element of "political offence" in Schtraks v Israel – "at odds with the State ... on some issue connected with the political control or government of the country".

=== United States ===
Statutory bars to extradition from the United States for political offences are limited; instead, the political offence exception is provided for in treaties. 18 U.S.C. § 3181 permits the extradition of "persons, other than citizens, nationals, or permanent residents of the United States, who have committed crimes of violence against nationals of the United States in foreign countries without regard to the existence of any treaty of extradition with such foreign government if the Attorney General certifies, in writing, that ... the offenses charged are not of a political nature", while 18 U.S.C. § 3185 provides that "No return or surrender shall be made of any person charged with the commission of any offense of a political nature" to a foreign country occupied by the United States.

To determine what qualifies as an offence of a "political nature", a United States court adopted England's political incidence test in the 1894 case In Re Ezeta, (Note: In re Ezeta, 62 F. 972 (N.D. Cal. 1894).) in which El Salvador sought the extradition of its former president Carlos Ezeta. In the 1896 case Ornelas v. Ruiz, (Note: Ornelas v. Ruiz, 161 U.S. 502 (1896).) the sole Supreme Court case on the political offence exception, the Court held that a group of men charged with murder, arson, robbery, and kidnapping committed during the course of a raid in Mexico were extraditable. Although the raid occurred contemporaneously with the Yaqui Uprising, the court found that the raid was unrelated and non-political in nature. U.S. courts, unlike their English counterparts, have continued to follow a strict definition of "uprising" when applying the political incidence test; specifically in 1986 in Quinn v Robinson, (Note: Quinn v. Robinson, 783 F.2d 776 (9th Cir. 1986).) the court would only allow application of the exception "when a certain level of violence exists and when those engaged in that violence are seeking to accomplish a particular objective"; it found that conditions in 1974–75 met the definition of "uprising" in Northern Ireland, but not in England where the offences occurred, and so Liam Quinn was ruled extraditable.

U.S. courts also follow the "rule of non-inquiry", under which consideration of the political motivations of the requesting party is a matter left to the discretion of the executive branch as part of its power to conduct foreign relations. In the 1980s, extradition treaties with Mexico and the Netherlands made the entire question of what constitutes a political offence a question for the executive branch, which was described as "the death knell" for the political offence exception in U.S. law. Legislation around the same time proposed by Representative William J. Hughes (D-NJ) and Senator Strom Thurmond (R-SC) also attempted to develop more detailed and stringent guidelines for the political offence exception in an effort to prevent terrorists from taking recourse to it, but did not pass. This was followed by signing of a Supplementary Treaty between the United Kingdom and the United States in 1985, which sharply contracted the definition of a political offence with the aim of curbing Provisional Irish Republican Army members' recourse to this provision; it was the first U.S. treaty to contain such an exception. As Legal Advisor to the Reagan State Department Abraham Sofaer testified in 1985 before the signing of the U.S/U.K treaty: “Most of the violent crimes are covered by the treaty [...] In terms of the treaty with the United Kingdom, anyone who acts in that way would not be entitled to invoke the political offense exception." He faced fierce opposition from IRA sympathizers as a consequence. Senator Joe Biden compared the judiciary of the U.K to South Africa’s apartheid regime. Christopher Blakesley described this as "evisceration" of the exception.

== Bibliography ==
- Blakesley, Christopher L. (1987). "The Evisceration of the Political Offense Exception to Extradition". Denver Journal of International Law and Policy. 15 (1).
- Buckland, Aimee J. (March 2006). "Offending Officials: Former Government Actors and the Political Offense Exception to Extradition". California Law Review. 94 (2): 423–456. doi:10.2307/20439039. JSTOR 20439039.
- Cantrell, Charles L. (Spring 1977). "The Political Offense Exemption in International Extradition: A Comparison of the United States, Great Britain and the Republic of Ireland". Marquette Law Review. 60 (3).
- DeFabo, Vincent (2012). "Terrorist or Revolutionary: The Development of the Political Offender Exception and Its Effects on Defining Terrorism in International Law". American University National Security Law Brief. 2 (2).
- Chau, Pak-kwan; Lam, Stephen (March 2001). Research Study on the Agreement between Hong Kong and the Mainland concerning Surrender of Fugitive Offenders (PDF). Research and Library Services Division, Legislative Council Secretariat.
- Forde, Michael; Kelly, Kieran (2011). Extradition Law and Transnational Criminal Procedure (4th ed.). Roundhall. ISBN 978-1-85800-622-2.
- Gilbert, Geoff (January 1992). "The Irish Interpretation of the Political Offence Exemption". International and Comparative Law Quarterly. 41 (1): 66–84. doi:10.1093/iclqaj/41.1.66.
- Gilbert, Geoff (2006). "Chapter 5: The Political Offence Exemption". Responding to International Crime. Martinus Nijhoff Publishers. ISBN 978-90-04-15276-2.
- Kinneally, James J. III (1987). "The Political Offense Exception: Is the United States–United Kingdom Supplementary Extradition Treaty the Beginning of the End?" (PDF). American University Journal of International Law and Policy. 2 (1). Archived from the original (PDF) on 22 April 2012.
- Lubet, Steven; Czackes, Morris (1980). "The Role of the American Judiciary in the Extradition of Political Terrorists". Journal of Criminal Law and Criminology. 71 (3): 193–210. doi:10.2307/1142695. JSTOR 1142695.
- Petersen, Antje C. (July 1992). "Extradition and the Political Offense Exception in the Suppression of Terrorism". Indiana Law Journal. 67 (3).
- Reece, Bob (January 2007). "The Kitingan Case, The Borneo States, and The Malaysian Constitution". Borneo Research Bulletin. 38 (1).
- Van Den Wijngaert, Christine (1983). "The political offence exception to extradition: defining the issues and searching a feasible alternative" (PDF). Revue beige de droit international. 20 (1).
- "Hong Kong". Commonwealth Law Bulletin. 21 (3). 1995. doi:10.1080/03050718.1995.9986423.
