= List of United States extradition treaties =

United States Countries with an extradition treaty with the United States

This list of United States extradition treaties includes 116 countries. The first U.S. extradition treaty was with Ecuador, in force from 1873. The most recent U.S. extradition treaty is with Croatia, in force from 2022.

The United States does not have an extradition treaty with China, Indonesia, Iran, Kazakhstan, Mongolia, Taiwan, Ukraine, Vietnam, the Gulf Cooperation Council states, most African states, and most former Soviet states, among others. Some countries with US extradition treaties have refused to extradite, including Cuba, Bolivia, Ecuador, Egypt, Iceland, Nicaragua, Pakistan, Switzerland, Venezuela, and Zimbabwe.

Country	Date signed	Entered into force	Citation	Type
Albania	March 1, 1933	November 14, 1935	49 Stat. 3313; TS 902; 5 Bevans 22; 166 LNTS 195	L
Antigua and Barbuda	June 3, 1996	July 1, 1999	TIAS 99-701.1	
Argentina	June 10, 1997	June 15, 2000	TIAS 12866; 2159 UNTS 129	
Australia	May 14, 1974	May 8, 1976	27 UST 957; TIAS 8234	
Australia	September 4, 1990	December 21, 1992	1736 UNTS 344; TIAS 92-1221	
Austria	January 8, 1998	January 1, 2000	TIAS 12916	
Austria	July 20, 2005	February 1, 2010	TIAS 10-201.2	
Bahamas	March 9, 1990	September 22, 1994	S. Treaty Doc. 102-17	
Barbados	February 28, 1996	March 3, 2000	TIAS 00-303	
Belgium	April 27, 1987	September 1, 1997	TIAS 97-901; 2093 UNTS 263	
Belgium	December 15, 2004	February 1, 2010	TIAS 10-201.3	
Belize	March 30, 1999	March 27, 2001	TIAS 13089	
Bolivia	June 27, 1995	November 21, 1996	TIAS 96-1121	
Bosnia and Herzegovina (Note: Continued application of the treaty with the Kingdom of Serbia, succeeded by Yugoslavia.)	October 25, 1901	June 11, 1902	32 Stat. 1890; TS 406; 12 Bevans 1238	
Brazil	January 13, 1961	December 17, 1964	15 UST 2093; TIAS 5691; 532 UNTS 177	
Brazil	June 18, 1962	December 17, 1964	15 UST 2112; TIAS 5691; 532 UNTS 198	
Bulgaria	September 19, 2007	May 21, 2009	TIAS 09-521	
Canada	December 3, 1971	March 22, 1976	27 UST 983; TIAS 8237	
Canada	June 28, 1974; July 9, 1974	March 22, 1976	27 UST 1017	
Canada	January 11, 1988	November 26, 1991	1853 UNTS 407; TIAS 91-1126	
Canada	January 12, 2001	April 30, 2003	TIAS 03-430	
Chile	April 17, 1900	June 26, 1902	32 Stat. 1850; TS 407; 6 Bevans 543	
Chile	June 5, 2013	December 14, 2016	TIAS 16-1214	
Colombia (Note: After the Supreme Court of Colombia invalidated the treaty in 1986, extraditions from Colombia to the United States are made under the Colombian constitution and laws. The treaty still applies to extraditions from the United States to Colombia.)	September 14, 1979	March 4, 1982	S. Treaty Doc. 97-8	
Congo, Republic of the (Note: Continued application of the treaties with France.)	January 6, 1909	July 27, 1911	37 Stat. 1526; TS 561; 7 Bevans 872	
Congo, Republic of the	January 15, 1929	May 19, 1929	46 Stat. 2276; TS 787; 7 Bevans 972; 92 LNTS 259	
Congo, Republic of the	April 23, 1936	September 24, 1936	50 Stat. 1117; TS 909; 7 Bevans 995; 172 LNTS 197	
Costa Rica	December 4, 1982	October 11, 1991	S. Treaty Doc. 98-17	
Croatia	October 25, 1901	June 12, 1902	32 Stat. 1890; TS 406; 12 Bevans 1238	
Croatia	December 10, 2019	December 28, 2022	TIAS 22-1228.1	
Cuba	April 6, 1904	March 2, 1905	33 Stat. 2265; TS 440; 6 Bevans 1128	
Cuba	December 6, 1904	March 2, 1905	33 Stat. 2273; TS 441; 6 Bevans 1134	
Cuba	January 14, 1926	June 18, 1926	44 Stat. 2392; TS 737; 6 Bevans 1136; 61 LNTS 363	
Cyprus	June 17, 1996	September 14, 1999	TIAS 99-914	
Cyprus	January 20, 2006	February 1, 2010	TIAS 10-201.4	
Czech Republic (Note: Continued application of the treaties with Czechoslovakia.)	July 2, 1925	March 29, 1926	44 Stat. 2367; TS 734; 6 Bevans 1247; 50 LNTS 143	
Czech Republic	April 29, 1935	August 28, 1935	49 Stat. 3253; TS 895; 6 Bevans 1283; 162 LNTS 83	
Czech Republic	May 16, 2006	February 1, 2010	TIAS 10-201.5	
Denmark	June 22, 1972	July 31, 1974	25 UST 1293; TIAS 7864	
Denmark	June 23, 2005	February 1, 2010	TIAS 10-201.6	
Dominica	October 10, 1996	May 25, 2000	TIAS 00-525	
Dominican Republic	January 12, 2015	December 15, 2016	TIAS 16-1215	
Ecuador	June 28, 1872	November 12, 1873	18 Stat. 199; TS 79; 7 Bevans 321	
Ecuador	September 22, 1939	May 29, 1941	55 Stat. 1196; TS 972; 7 Bevans 346	
Egypt (Note: Continued application of the treaty with the Ottoman Empire.)	August 11, 1874	April 22, 1875	19 Stat. 572; TS 270; 10 Bevans 642	
El Salvador	April 18, 1911	July 10, 1911	37 Stat. 1516; TS 560; 7 Bevans 507	
Estonia	February 8, 2006	April 7, 2009	TIAS 09-407	
Eswatini (Note: Continued application of the treaty with the United Kingdom.)	December 22, 1931	June 24, 1935	47 Stat. 2122; TS 849; 12 Bevans 482; 163 LNTS 59	
Fiji	December 22, 1931	June 24, 1935	47 Stat. 2122; TS 849; 12 Bevans 482; 163 LNTS 59	
Finland	June 11, 1976	May 11, 1980	31 UST 944; TIAS 9626; 1203 UNTS 165	
Finland	December 16, 2004	February 1, 2010	TIAS 10-201.7	
France	April 23, 1996	February 1, 2002	TIAS 02-201; 2179 UNTS 341	
France	September 30, 2004	February 1, 2010	TIAS 10-201.8	
Gambia	December 22, 1931	June 24, 1935	47 Stat. 2122; TS 849; 12 Bevans 482; 163 LNTS 59	
Germany	June 20, 1978	August 29, 1980	32 UST 1485; TIAS 9785; 1220 UNTS 269	
Germany	October 21, 1986	March 11, 1993	1909 UNTS 441	
Germany	April 18, 2006	February 1, 2010	TIAS 10-201.9	
Ghana	December 22, 1931	June 24, 1935	47 Stat. 2122; TS 849; 12 Bevans 482; 163 LNTS 59	
Greece	May 6, 1931	November 1, 1932	47 Stat. 2185; TS 855; 8 Bevans 353; 138 LNTS 293	
Greece	September 2, 1937	September 2, 1937	51 Stat. 357; EAS 114; 8 Bevans 366; 185 LNTS 408	
Greece	January 18, 2006	February 1, 2010	TIAS 10-201.10	
Grenada	May 30, 1996	September 14, 1999	TIAS 99-914.1	
Guatemala	February 27, 1903	August 15, 1903	33 Stat. 2147; TS 425; 8 Bevans 482	
Guatemala	February 20, 1940	March 13, 1941	55 Stat. 1097; TS 963; 8 Bevans 528	
Guyana	December 22, 1931	June 24, 1935	47 Stat. 2122; TS 849; 12 Bevans 482; 163 LNTS 59	
Haiti	August 9, 1904	June 28, 1905	34 Stat. 2858; TS 447; 8 Bevans 653	
Honduras	January 15, 1909	July 10, 1912	37 Stat. 1616; TS 569; 8 Bevans 892	
Honduras	February 21, 1927	June 5, 1928	45 Stat. 2489; TS 761; 8 Bevans 903; 85 LNTS 491	
Hong Kong	December 20, 1996	January 21, 1998 (Note: Suspended on August 19, 2020.); Suspended on August 19, 2020	TIAS 98-121	
Hungary	December 1, 1994	March 18, 1997	TIAS 97-318	
Hungary	November 15, 2005	February 1, 2010	TIAS 10-201.11	
Iceland (Note: Continued application of the treaties with Denmark.)	January 6, 1902	May 16, 1902	32 Stat. 1906; TS 405; 7 Bevans 38	
Iceland	November 6, 1905	February 19, 1906	34 Stat. 2887; TS 449; 7 Bevans 43	
India	June 25, 1997	July 21, 1999	TIAS 12873	
Iraq	June 7, 1934	April 23, 1936	49 Stat. 3380; TS 907; 9 Bevans 1; 170 LNTS 267	L
Ireland	July 13, 1983	December 15, 1984	TIAS 10813	
Ireland	July 14, 2005	February 1, 2010	TIAS 10-201.12	
Israel	December 10, 1962	December 5, 1963	14 UST 1707; TIAS 5476; 484 UNTS 283	
Israel	April 4, 1967	April 11, 1967	18 UST 382; TIAS 6246	
Israel	July 6, 2005	January 10, 2007	TIAS 07-110	
Italy	October 13, 1983	September 24, 1984	35 UST 3023; TIAS 10837; 1590 UNTS 161	
Italy	May 3, 2006	February 1, 2010	TIAS 10-201.13	
Jamaica	June 14, 1983	July 7, 1991	S. Treaty Doc. 98-18	
Japan	March 3, 1978	March 26, 1980	31 UST 892; TIAS 9625; 1203 UNTS 225	DC
Jordan	March 28, 1995	July 29, 1995	S. Treaty Doc. 104-3	
Kenya	December 22, 1931	June 24, 1935	47 Stat. 2122; TS 849; 12 Bevans 482; 163 LNTS 59	
Kiribati	June 8, 1972	January 21, 1977	28 UST 227; TIAS 8468	
Kosovo	March 29, 2016	June 13, 2019	TIAS 19-613	
Latvia	December 7, 2005	April 15, 2009	TIAS 09-415	
Lesotho	December 22, 1931	June 24, 1935	47 Stat. 2122; TS 849; 12 Bevans 482; 163 LNTS 59	
Liberia	November 1, 1937	November 21, 1939	54 Stat. 1733; TS 955; 9 Bevans 589; 201 LNTS 151	
Liechtenstein	May 20, 1936	June 28, 1937	50 Stat. 1337; TS 915; 9 Bevans 648; 183 LNTS 181	
Lithuania	October 23, 2001	March 31, 2003	TIAS 13166	
Lithuania	June 15, 2005	February 1, 2010	TIAS 10-201.14	
Luxembourg	October 1, 1996	February 1, 2002	TIAS 12804	DC
Luxembourg	February 1, 2005	February 1, 2010	TIAS 10-201.15	
Malawi	December 22, 1931	June 24, 1935	47 Stat. 2122; TS 849; 12 Bevans 482; 163 LNTS 59	
Malaysia	August 3, 1995	June 2, 1997	TIAS 97-602	
Malta	May 18, 2006	July 1, 2009	TIAS 09-701	
Marshall Islands	April 30, 2003	May 1, 2004	TIAS 04-501.2	
Mauritius	December 22, 1931	June 24, 1935	47 Stat. 2122; TS 849; 12 Bevans 482; 163 LNTS 59	
Mexico	May 4, 1978	January 25, 1980	31 UST 5059; TIAS 9656	
Mexico	November 13, 1997	May 21, 2001	TIAS 12897	
Micronesia	May 14, 2003	June 25, 2004	TIAS 04-625.4	
Monaco	February 15, 1939	March 28, 1940	54 Stat. 1780; TS 959; 9 Bevans 1272; 202 LNTS 61	
Montenegro	October 25, 1901	June 12, 1902	32 Stat. 1890; TS 406; 12 Bevans 1238	
Myanmar	December 22, 1931	November 1, 1941	47 Stat. 2122; TS 849; 12 Bevans 482; 163 LNTS 59	
Nauru	December 22, 1931	August 30, 1935	47 Stat. 2122; TS 849; 12 Bevans 482; 163 LNTS 59	
Netherlands	June 24, 1980	September 15, 1983	35 UST 1334; TIAS 10733	
Netherlands	September 29, 2004	February 1, 2010	TIAS 10-201.16	
New Zealand	January 12, 1970	December 8, 1970	22 UST 1; TIAS 7035; 791 UNTS 253	L
Nicaragua	March 1, 1905	July 14, 1907	35 Stat. 1869; TS 462; 10 Bevans 356	
Nigeria	December 22, 1931	June 24, 1935	47 Stat. 2122; TS 849; 12 Bevans 482; 163 LNTS 59	
North Macedonia	October 25, 1901	June 12, 1902	32 Stat. 1890; TS 406; 12 Bevans 1238	
Norway	June 9, 1977	March 7, 1980	31 UST 5619; TIAS 9679; 1220 UNTS 221	
Pakistan	December 22, 1931	March 9, 1942	47 Stat. 2122; TS 849; 12 Bevans 482; 163 LNTS 59	
Palau	January 10, 1986	October 1, 1994		
Panama	May 25, 1904	May 8, 1905	34 Stat. 2851; TS 445; 10 Bevans 673	
Papua New Guinea	December 22, 1931	August 30, 1935	47 Stat. 2122; TS 849; 12 Bevans 482; 163 LNTS 59	
Paraguay	November 9, 1998	March 9, 2001	TIAS 12995	
Peru	July 26, 2001	August 25, 2003	TIAS 03-825	
Philippines	November 13, 1994	November 22, 1996	TIAS 96-1122; 1994 UNTS 279	
Poland	July 10, 1996	September 17, 1999	TIAS 99-917	
Poland	June 9, 2006	February 1, 2010	TIAS 10-201.17	
Portugal	May 7, 1908	November 14, 1908	35 Stat. 2071; TS 512; 11 Bevans 314	
Portugal	July 14, 2005	February 1, 2010	TIAS 10-201.18	
Romania	September 10, 2007	May 8, 2009	TIAS 09-508	
Russia	March 28, 1887	February 14, 1893	S. Treaty Doc. 106-22	
Saint Kitts and Nevis	September 18, 1996	February 23, 2000	TIAS 12805	DC
Saint Lucia	April 18, 1996	February 2, 2000	TIAS 00-202	
Saint Vincent and the Grenadines	August 15, 1996	September 8, 1999	TIAS 99-908	
San Marino	January 10, 1906	July 8, 1908	35 Stat. 1971; TS 495; 11 Bevans 440	
San Marino	October 10, 1934	June 28, 1935	49 Stat. 3198; TS 891; 11 Bevans 446; 161 LNTS 149	
Serbia	August 15, 2016	April 23, 2019	TIAS 19-423	
Seychelles	December 22, 1931	June 24, 1935	47 Stat. 2122; TS 849; 12 Bevans 482; 163 LNTS 59	
Sierra Leone	December 22, 1931	June 24, 1935	47 Stat. 2122; TS 849; 12 Bevans 482; 163 LNTS 59	
Singapore	December 22, 1931	June 24, 1935	47 Stat. 2122; TS 849; 12 Bevans 482; 163 LNTS 59	
Slovakia	July 2, 1925	March 29, 1926	44 Stat. 2367; TS 734; 6 Bevans 1247; 50 LNTS 143	
Slovakia	April 29, 1935	August 28, 1935	49 Stat. 3253; TS 895; 6 Bevans 1283; 162 LNTS 83	
Slovakia	February 6, 2006	February 1, 2010	TIAS 10-201.19	
Slovenia	October 25, 1901	June 12, 1902	32 Stat. 1890; TS 406; 12 Bevans 1238	
Slovenia	October 17, 2005	February 1, 2010	TIAS 10-201.20	
South Africa	September 16, 1999	June 25, 2001	TIAS 13060	
South Korea	June 9, 1998	December 20, 1999	TIAS 12962	
Spain	May 29, 1970	June 16, 1971	22 UST 737; TIAS 7136; 796 UNTS 245	
Spain	January 25, 1975	June 2, 1978	29 UST 2283; TIAS 8938	
Spain	February 9, 1988	July 2, 1993	S. Treaty Doc. 102-24	
Spain	March 12, 1996	July 25, 1999	S. Treaty Doc. 105-15	
Spain	December 17, 2004	February 1, 2010	TIAS 10-201.21	
Sri Lanka	September 30, 1999	January 12, 2001	TIAS 13066	
Suriname (Note: Continued application of the treaties with the Netherlands.)	June 2, 1887	July 11, 1889	26 Stat. 1481; TS 256: 10 Bevans 47	
Suriname	January 18, 1904	August 28, 1904	33 Stat. 2257; TS 436: 10 Bevans 53	
Sweden	October 24, 1961	December 3, 1963	14 UST 1845; TIAS 5496; 494 UNTS 141	
Sweden	March 14, 1983	September 24, 1984	35 UST 2501; TIAS 10812	
Sweden	December 16, 2004	February 1, 2010	TIAS 10-201.22	
Switzerland	November 14, 1990	September 10, 1997	TIAS 97-910	
Tanzania	December 22, 1931	June 24, 1935	47 Stat. 2122; TS 849; 12 Bevans 482; 163 LNTS 59	
Tanzania	November 30, 1965; December 6, 1965	December 6, 1965	16 UST 2066; TIAS 5946; 592 UNTS 53	
Thailand	December 14, 1983	May 17, 1991	TIAS 91-517	
Tonga	December 22, 1931	August 1, 1966	47 Stat. 2122; TS 849; 12 Bevans 482; 163 LNTS 59	
Tonga	March 14, 1977; April 13, 1977	April 13, 1977	28 UST 5290; TIAS 8628; 1087 UNTS 289	
Trinidad and Tobago	March 4, 1996	November 29, 1999	TIAS 99-1129	
Turkey	June 7, 1979	January 1, 1981	32 UST 3111; TIAS 9891	
Tuvalu	June 8, 1972	January 21, 1977	28 UST 227; TIAS 8468	
United Kingdom	March 31, 2003	April 26, 2007	TIAS 07-426	
United Kingdom	December 16, 2004	February 1, 2010	TIAS 10-201.23	
Uruguay	April 6, 1973	April 11, 1984	35 UST 3197; TIAS 10850	
Venezuela	January 19, 1922; January 21, 1922	April 14, 1923	43 Stat. 1698; TS 675; 12 Bevans 1128; 49 LNTS 435	
Zambia	December 22, 1931	June 24, 1935	47 Stat. 2122; TS 849; 12 Bevans 482; 163 LNTS 59	
Zimbabwe	July 25, 1997	April 26, 2000	TIAS 00-426	

Legend

- Type L: List treaty
- Type DC: Dual criminality treaty
