= Charles Zentai =

Hungarian war criminal

Charles Zentai (born Károly Steiner; October 8, 1921 – December 13, 2017) was a Hungarian-born resident of Australia accused of a Holocaust-related war crime. He resided in Perth, Western Australia for many years after living in the American- and French-occupied zones of post-World War II Germany.

He was on the Simon Wiesenthal Center's list of most wanted Nazi war criminals until 2013.

== Background ==
Zentai, who denied the charges against him, was serving in the Hungarian Army as a warrant officer at the time he was accused of having murdered Péter Balázs, an 18-year-old Jewish man, in November 1944. According to witnesses, Balázs was not wearing his yellow star on the train, a crime punishable by death in German-occupied Hungary at the time. Zentai allegedly took him to an army barracks, beat him to death, and threw his body into the Danube.

Zentai was tracked down by The Simon Wiesenthal Center, which also headed the effort to extradite him to Hungary to stand trial before a military tribunal. Efraim Zuroff, director of the Simon Wiesenthal Center, presented the allegations against Zentai to Hungarian prosecutors.

Zentai was arrested on 8 July 2005 by the Australian Federal Police to await an extradition hearing. His family said at the time that the 86-year-old widower had heart disease and peripheral neuropathy, and would not survive the trip to Hungary.

== Extradition fight ==
In early 2007, a magistrate found that he should return to Hungary. Zentai appealed against the extradition to the Federal Court of Australia, which on 16 April 2007 dismissed the appeal.

An appeal to the High Court in 2008 was also dismissed. Simon Wiesenthal Center director Efraim Zuroff said he was very pleased that Zentai's appeals had been rejected and that "the extradition process can finally proceed."

On 1 October 2007, new evidence came to light: a testimony by Zentai's military commander which was used at a trial in the Budapest People's Court in February 1948. This commander blamed a fellow soldier who was later convicted.

On 2 March 2009, Zentai passed a polygraph test conducted by Gavin Willson from National Lie Detectors. In interviews, Willson expressed "no doubt" that Zentai was telling him the truth.

Zentai's lawyers continued to argue against extradition, saying that the offence of "war crimes" did not exist in Hungary in 1944, when the alleged crime took place.

Zentai remained free while his case was appealed to the full bench of the Federal Court. However, on 22 October 2009, he was imprisoned at Hakea Prison, after losing his appeals against being detained. The Australian government approved Zentai's extradition to Hungary on 12 November 2009, making Zentai's case the first in which an Australian government approved the extradition of a Nazi suspect. On 16 December 2009, Zentai was released from prison after being granted bail.

Upon further appeal, the Federal Court overturned the extradition order on 2 July 2010. During the appeal, Zentai's defence lawyers argued that Zentai could not be extradited, as the Hungarian authorities had not charged him with an offence, and instead he was only being ordered to return to face questioning. The court found that the government did not have the jurisdiction to order Zentai's extradition.

In early January 2011 the Australian Home Affairs Minister, Brendan O'Connor, lodged an appeal in the Federal Court against the decision (that as the Hungarian authorities had not laid charges, the Australian government did not have the legal power to extradite him).

On 15 August 2012, the High Court of Australia ruled that 90-year-old Zentai could not be extradited because the offence of a "war crime" did not exist in Hungarian law in 1944, which is a requirement under Australia's extradition treaty with Hungary.

Zentai died in Perth on 13 December 2017, aged 96.

== See also ==
- Extradition law in Australia
- John Demjanjuk
- Sándor Képíró
- Ivan Polyukhovich
