= List of Dutch extradition treaties =

The Netherlands has, in the light of assistance in criminal matters, concluded treaties for the extradition of suspects and fugitive convicts with several states. The treaties can bi- as well as multilateral. With some countries the Netherlands has both bi- and multilateral treaties at the same time. In those cases, most of the time the multilateral one is the most novel, and thus is the one applied. There are countries with which the Netherlands has a classic extradition treaty and countries which fall, together with the Netherlands, under the system of the European Arrest Warrant. Some countries do not extradite their own nationals. The Netherlands does. Moreover, it even does not require reciprocity on the matter. The Netherlands will, however, not extradite when there is a chance the extraditee will be sentenced to death.

== Types of extradition ==
There are two régimes under which individuals can be surrendered to another state to stand trial or to undergo their sentence:

1. The régime of surrendering under the European Arrest Warrant. This régime is exclusively applicable within the European Union and with Iceland, Norway and the United Kingdom. This system is based on Council Framework Decision 2002/584/JHA . The Netherlands has implemented this decision the Overleveringswet (Surrendering Act).

2. The régime of extradition is used for all other countries. In the Netherlands, extradition is exclusively possible if there is a treaty with the requesting country. The execution of the treaties is governed by the Uitleveringswet (Extradition Act).

== Types of treaties ==
There are, roughly speaking, four types of establishing dual criminality:

1. The enumeration system - In this system, the crimes which can lead to extradition are explicitly listed in the treaty. Dual criminality is however required.

2. The elimination system - In this system, there is no list. Dual criminality is established if the crime is punishable in both countries and is threatened with a minimum maximum penalty in both countries. The minimum maximum penalty is established in the treaty concerned. In case of extradition for execution, the treaty provides a minimum remaining term of sentence which still had to be served.

3. The combination system - These are treaties with a list and a minimum maximum sentence. If the extradition cannot take place because the maximum penalty in one of the countries does not fulfill the minimum established in the treaty, extradition can still happen if the crime is listed in the treaty.

4. All the above systems have the requirement that the crime must be punishable in both countries. Type number 4, the European Arrest Warrant (EAW), does not always have that requirement. Requests from other EU member states are treated like the above mentioned combination system, with the exception for dual punishability. This is not required for crimes on the list.

== List of extradition treaties ==
Country	System	Treaty type	Extradition of Dutch nationals	Extradition of nationals to the Netherlands	Remarks
Albania	Elimination	Multilateral	Yes	No	European Convention on Extradition
Andorra	Elimination	Multilateral	Yes	No	European Convention on Extradition
Argentina	Enumeration	Bilateral	No	No	Treaty between the Kingdom of the Netherlands and the Argentine Republic for the mutual extradition of criminals, signed in Buenos Aires on 7 September 1893
Armenia	Elimination	Multilateral	Probably	No	European Convention on Extradition
Australia	Elimination	Bilateral	Yes	Probably	Treaty between Australia and the Kingdom of the Netherlands on Mutual Assistance in Criminal Matters, signed in Canberra on 26 October 1988
(European Union) Austria	EAW	Multilateral	Yes	Yes	Council Framework Decision 2002/584/JHA
Azerbaijan	Elimination	Multilateral	Probably	No	European Convention on Extradition
Bahamas	Enumeration	Continuation	Probably	Unknown	Continuation of the Extradition Treaty between the Kingdom of the Netherlands and the United Kingdom of Great Britain and Ireland, signed in London on 26 September 1898
(European Union) Belgium	EAW	Multilateral	Yes	Yes	Council Framework Decision 2002/584/JHA
Bosnia and Herzegovina	Elimination	Multilateral	Probably	Unknown	European Convention on Extradition
(European Union) Bulgaria	EAW	Multilateral	Yes	Yes	Council Framework Decision 2002/584/JHA
Canada	Elimination	Bilateral	Yes	Yes	Treaty Between Canada and the Kingdom of the Netherlands on Extradition, signed in Montréal in 13 October 1989
(European Union) Croatia	EAW	Multilateral	Yes	Yes	Council Framework Decision 2002/584/JHA
(European Union) Cyprus	EAW	Multilateral	Yes	Yes	Council Framework Decision 2002/584/JHA
(European Union) Czech Republic	EAW	Multilateral	Yes	Yes	Council Framework Decision 2002/584/JHA
(European Union) Denmark	EAW	Multilateral	Yes	Yes	Council Framework Decision 2002/584/JHA
(European Union) Estonia	EAW	Multilateral	Yes	Yes	Council Framework Decision 2002/584/JHA
(European Union) Finland	EAW	Multilateral	Yes	Yes	Council Framework Decision 2002/584/JHA
(European Union) France	EAW	Multilateral	Yes	Yes	Council Framework Decision 2002/584/JHA
Georgia	Elimination	Multilateral	Yes	Yes	European Convention on Extradition
(European Union) Germany	EAW	Multilateral	Yes	Yes	Council Framework Decision 2002/584/JHA
(European Union) Greece	EAW	Multilateral	Yes	Yes	Council Framework Decision 2002/584/JHA
Hong Kong	Enumeration	Bilateral	No	Probably not	Agreement between the Government of the Kingdom of the Netherlands and the Government of the Hong Kong Special Administrative Region of the People's Republic of China concerning mutual legal assistance in criminal matters, signed in Hong Kong 26 August 2002; Suspended since 21 October 2020
(European Union) Hungary	EAW	Multilateral	Yes	Yes	Council Framework Decision 2002/584/JHA
Iceland	EAW	Multilateral	Yes	Yes	Agreement between the European Union and the Republic of Iceland and the Kingdom of Norway on the surrender procedure between the Member States of the European Union and Iceland and Norway, signed in Vienna on 28 June 2006
India	Enumeration	Continuation	Probably	No	Continuation of the Extradition Treaty between the Kingdom of the Netherlands and the United Kingdom of Great Britain and Ireland, signed in London on 26 September 1898
(European Union) Ireland	EAW	Multilateral	Yes	Yes	Council Framework Decision 2002/584/JHA
Israel	Elimination	Multilateral	Yes	Yes	European Convention on Extradition
(European Union) Italy	EAW	Multilateral	Yes	Yes	Council Framework Decision 2002/584/JHA
Kenya	Enumeration	Continuation	No	Unknown	Continuation of the Extradition Treaty between the Kingdom of the Netherlands and the United Kingdom of Great Britain and Ireland, signed in London on 26 September 1898
(European Union) Latvia	EAW	Multilateral	Yes	Yes	Council Framework Decision 2002/584/JHA
Liberia	Enumeration	Bilateral	No	No	Agreement between the Kingdom of the Netherlands and the Republic Liberia for governing the mutual extradition of criminals, signed in The Hague on 2 February 1895
Liechtenstein	Elimination	Multilateral	Yes	No	European Convention on Extradition
(European Union) Lithuania	EAW	Multilateral	Yes	Yes	Council Framework Decision 2002/584/JHA
(European Union) Luxembourg	EAW	Multilateral	Yes	Yes	Council Framework Decision 2002/584/JHA
Malawi	Enumeration	Continuation	No	Unknown	Continuation of the Extradition Treaty between the Kingdom of the Netherlands and the United Kingdom of Great Britain and Ireland, signed in London on 26 September 1898
(European Union) Malta	EAW	Multilateral	Yes	Yes	Council Framework Decision 2002/584/JHA
Mexico	Elimination	Bilateral	No	No	Extradition treaty between the Kingdom of the Netherlands and Mexico, signed 16 December 1907 in Mexico DF
Moldova	Elimination	Multilateral	Yes	No	European Convention on Extradition
Monaco	Elimination	Multilateral	Unknown	Unknown	European Convention on Extradition
Montenegro	Elimination	Multilateral	Yes	No	European Convention on Extradition
Morocco	Elimination	Bilateral	No	No	Treaty Between the Kingdom of the Netherlands and the Kingdom of Morocco on Extradition, signed in Rabat on 18 December 2023; Not yet into force; A death penalty will, by virtue of the treaty, automatically be converted to the maximum penalty of the requesting party; If the extradition of a national is refused, the refusing state must take over the prosecution.
New Zealand	Enumeration	Continuation	No	Unknown	Continuation of the Extradition Treaty between the Kingdom of the Netherlands and the United Kingdom of Great Britain and Ireland, signed in London on 26 September 1898
North Macedonia	Elimination	Multilateral	Yes	No	European Convention on Extradition
Norway	EAW	Multilateral	Yes	Yes	Agreement between the European Union and the Republic of Iceland and the Kingdom of Norway on the surrender procedure between the Member States of the European Union and Iceland and Norway, signed in Vienna on 28 June 2006
Pakistan	Enumeration	Continuation	No	No	Continuation of the Extradition Treaty between the Kingdom of the Netherlands and the United Kingdom of Great Britain and Ireland, signed in London on 26 September 1898
(European Union) Poland	EAW	Multilateral	Yes	Yes	Council Framework Decision 2002/584/JHA
(European Union) Portugal	EAW	Multilateral	Yes	Yes	Council Framework Decision 2002/584/JHA
(European Union) Romania	EAW	Multilateral	Yes	Yes	Council Framework Decision 2002/584/JHA
Russia	Elimination	Multilateral	Probably	No	European Convention on Extradition
San Marino	Elimination	Multilateral	Yes	No	European Convention on Extradition
Serbia	Elimination	Multilateral	Yes	Probably not	European Convention on Extradition
(European Union) Slovakia	EAW	Multilateral	Yes	Yes	Council Framework Decision 2002/584/JHA
(European Union) Slovenia	EAW	Multilateral	Yes	Yes	Council Framework Decision 2002/584/JHA
South Africa	Elimination	Multilateral	No	Unknown	European Convention on Extradition
South Korea	Elimination	Multilateral	Yes	Unknown	European Convention on Extradition
(European Union) Spain	EAW	Multilateral	Yes	Yes	Council Framework Decision 2002/584/JHA
Surinam	Elimination	Bilateral	No	No	Agreement between the Kingdom of the Netherlands and the Republic of Surinam on the extradition and assistance in criminal matters, signed in The Hague on 27 August 1976
(European Union) Sweden	EAW	Multilateral	Yes	Yes	Council Framework Decision 2002/584/JHA
Switzerland	Elimination	Multilateral	Yes	Unknown	European Convention on Extradition
Tanzania	Enumeration	Continuation	No	Unknown	Continuation of the Extradition Treaty between the Kingdom of the Netherlands and the United Kingdom of Great Britain and Ireland, signed in London on 26 September 1898
Trinidad and Tobago	Elimination	Bilateral	Yes	Yes	Treaty between the Kingdom of the Netherlands and Trinidad and Tobago on extradition, signed in Port of Spain on 7th Februari 2003; Not ratified, but provisionally in effect.
Turkey	Elimination	Multilateral	Yes	No	European Convention on Extradition
Uganda	Enumeration	Continuation	No	Unknown	Continuation of the Extradition Treaty between the Kingdom of the Netherlands and the United Kingdom of Great Britain and Ireland, signed in London on 26 September 1898
Ukraine	Elimination	Multilateral	Yes	No	European Convention on Extradition
United Arab Emirates	Elimination	Bilateral	No	Probably not	Agreement between the Kingdom of the Netherlands and the United Arab Emirates on extradition, signed in Abu Dhabi on 29 August 2021; Execution of a death sentence or corporal punishment is a ground for refusal; if the extradition of a national is refused, the refusing state must take over the prosecution.
United Kingdom	EAW	Multilateral	Yes	Yes	Trade and cooperation agreement between the European Union and the European Atomic Energy Community, on the one part, and the United Kingdom of Great Britain and Northern Ireland, on the other part, signed in Brussels 30 December 2020 (Part III)
United States	Combination	Bilateral	Yes	Yes	Extradition treaty between the Kingdom of the Netherlands and the United States of America, signed in The Hague on 24 June 1980; Execution of a death sentence is a ground for refusal
