= List of Indian extradition treaties =

🟦- India | 🟩- Countries which have extradition treaty with India | 🟥- Countries which have extradition arrangement with India

The following is a list of countries with whom India has extradition treaties :

Country	Year of Treaty	Link
Afghanistan	2016	
Australia	2011	
Azerbaijan	2013	
Bahrain	2012	
Bangladesh	2015	
Belarus	2017	
Belgium	2016	
Bhutan	2014	
Brazil	2012	
Bulgaria	2011	
Canada	2020	
Chile	1897	
Egypt	2008	
France	2003	
Germany	2001	
Hong Kong	1997	
Indonesia	2011	
Iran	2008	
Israel	2012	
Kuwait	2004	
Lithuania	2017	
Malawi	2018	
Malaysia	2010	
Mauritius	2003	
Mexico	2007	
Mongolia	2001	
Nepal	1953	
Netherlands	1898	
Oman	2004	
Philippines	2010	
Poland	2003	
Portugal	2010	
Russia	1998	
Saudi Arabia	2010	
South Africa	2003	
South Korea	2004	
Spain	2002	
Switzerland	1880	
Tajikistan	2003	
Thailand	2013	
Tunisia	2000	
Turkey	2001	
United Arab Emirates	1999	
United Kingdom	1992	
Ukraine	2002	
United States	1997	
Uzbekistan	2000	
Vietnam	2011	

== List of countries with whom India has extradition arrangements ==
Country	Year of Arrangement	Link
Antigua and Barbuda	2001	
Armenia	2019	
Croatia	2011	
Fiji	1979	
Italy	2003	
Papua New Guinea	1978	
Peru	2011	
Singapore	1972	
Sri Lanka	1978	
Sweden	1963	
Tanzania	1966	
New Zealand	2021	
