= Political crime =

Offense against the state, its government, or the political system

In criminology, a political crime or political offence is an offence that prejudices the interests of the state or its government. States may criminalise any behaviour perceived as a threat, real or imagined, to the state's survival, including both violent and non-violent opposition. A consequence of such criminalisation may be that a range of human rights, civil rights, and freedoms are curtailed, and conduct which would not normally be considered criminal per se (in other words, that is not antisocial according to those who engage in it) is criminalised at the convenience of the group holding power.

Thus, there may be a question of the morality of a law which simply criminalises ordinary political dissent, even though the majority of those who support the current regime may consider criminalisation of politically motivated behaviour an acceptable response when the offender is driven by more extreme political, ideological, religious or other beliefs.

Political crime is to be distinguished from state crime, in which states break their own criminal laws or international law.

== Overview ==
At one extreme, crimes such as treason, sedition, and terrorism are political because they represent a direct challenge to the government in power. Espionage is usually considered a political crime. But offenders do not have to aim to overthrow the government or to depose its leaders to be acting in a way perceived as "political". A state may perceive it threatening if individuals advocate change to the established order, or argue the need for reform of long-established policies, or engage in acts signifying some degree of disloyalty, e.g. by burning the nation's flag in public. But the scope of such crimes can be rather less direct.

Structural functionist criminologists recognise that states invest their resources in maintaining order through social conformity, i.e. a particular culture is encouraged and maintained through the primary social discourses which may include religious, economic, social, or other less formal concerns. Any interference with the media of communication or the sets of meanings embedded in the communications themselves may be perceived as a threat to the political authority of the state. Hence, whether in hard copy or electronically, if individuals distribute material containing uncensored information which undermines the credibility of state-controlled news media, this may be considered threatening.

Moreover, even an offence against non-governmental institutions, persons, or practices may be deemed political. Violence or even discrimination against an ethnic or racial group, as well trade union strikes or picketing against private employers, can be perceived as a political crime when those in power see such conduct as undermining the political (and economic) stability of the state. In this context, note that the Law Enforcement Code of Conduct passed by the International Association of Chiefs of Police says in part: "The fundamental duties of a police officer include serving the community, safeguarding lives and property, protecting the innocent, keeping the peace and ensuring the rights of all to liberty, equality and justice" (cited in Robinson, 2002). This code requires that police behave in a courteous and fair manner, that they treat all citizens in a respectable and decent manner, and that they never use unnecessary force. When they do, it is argued that this constitutes a crime (e.g. as an assault) and, if it is institutionalised, then over time, the use of unnecessary force become a state crime.

Marxist criminologists argue that most political crime arises from the efforts of the state to reproduce the structures of inequality: racism, sexism, ethnic preference as well as class advantages. Thus, states will protect property rights and reduce the rights of trade unions to represent the interests of the poor. Even war could be grounded in the problems of local capitalists in wealthy countries in the effort to move raw materials, profits and jobs in a globalised political economy, and opposing such a war will be a political crime. Marxists do not dispute that, for a society to function efficiently, social order is necessary. But they consider that, in all societies, one class, usually characterised as the "ruling class", gains far more than other classes. Marxists agree with functionalists that socialisation plays a crucial role in promoting conformity and order. However, unlike the latter, they are highly critical of the ideas, values and norms of "capitalist ideology". Modern Marxists point to education and the media as socialising agencies, which delude or "mystify" the working class into conforming to a social order, which works against its real interests. Thus, all controls which directly or indirectly exploit the criminal law to control access to the discourses are political crimes.

== Authoritarian governments ==
Miller says that one of the defining characteristics of power in modern history has been the rationalisation and bureaucratisation of law. Legal codification, or at least debates over the merits of legal codification, became an almost global phenomenon in the nineteenth century as state power was centralised. In particular, the rationalisation of criminal law standardised not just the concept of crime, but was adopted as the means to eliminate the "deviant" as a threat to a modern, uniform, moral standard. In this, the religious establishment began to play a new role in defining "evil" in which threats to the political or social norm became as dangerous as threats to religious orthodoxy. Thus, political speech became one of the most likely activities to be criminalised. The freedom of association and to meet may also be criminalised if the purpose is to express oppositional political views.

Because a political offender may be fighting against a tyrannical government, treaties have usually specified that a person cannot be extradited for a political offense (the political offence exception). Thomas Jefferson wrote:

Treason. This, when real, merits the highest punishment. But most Codes extend their definitions of treason to acts not really against one's country. They do not distinguish between acts against the government, and acts against the Oppressions of the Government. The latter are virtues: yet have furnished more victims to the Executioner than the former. Because real Treasons are rare: Oppressions frequent. The unsuccessful Struggles against Tyranny have been the chief Martyrs of Treason laws in all countries. Reformation of government with our neighbors, as much wanting now as Reformation of religion is, or ever was anywhere. We should not wish then to give up to the Executioner the Patriot who fails, and flees to us. Treasons then, taking the simulated with the real are sufficiently punished by Exile.

== Specific crimes ==
=== Terrorism ===
People convicted or suspected of certain crimes classified as terrorism by the government of their country (or some foreign countries) reject that classification. They consider that their fight is a legitimate one using legitimate means, and thus their crimes should be more appropriately called political crimes and justify special treatment in the penal system (as if they were soldiers in a war and therefore covered by the Geneva Convention). States tend to consider the political nature of the crimes an aggravating factor in the sentencing process and make no distinction between the terrorists and "ordinary" offenders, e.g. the convicted murderers of Action Directe consider themselves political prisoners.

=== Religious crimes ===
Where there is no clear separation between the state and the prevailing religion, the edicts of the church may be codified as law and enforced by the secular policing and judicial authorities. This is a highly functionalist mechanism for enforcing conformity in all aspects of cultural life and the use of the label "crime" adds an extra layer of stigma to those convicted.

== See also ==
- Impeachment
- List of banned political parties
- Political censorship
- Political repression
- Political trial
