= Extradition law in Australia =

Extradition law in Australia permits the formal process by which a fugitive found outside a jurisdiction is surrendered to the jurisdiction where an alleged offence has taken place for trial or punishment. This may include a process done within the country or one between Australia and another country.

== Interstate extradition ==
The Commonwealth Parliament has concurrent power with the states to make laws for the extradition of persons between and among the Australian states. The power is conferred by s 51(xxiv) of the Australian Constitution which says that the Commonwealth Parliament shall, subject to the Constitution, have the power to make laws for the peace, order, and good government of the Commonwealth with respect to (inter alia):

the service and execution throughout the Commonwealth of the civil and criminal process and the judgments of the courts of the States.

In respect of Australian territories, the power is exclusive.

Interstate extradition procedures are governed by Part 5 of the Service and Execution of Process Act 1992 (Cth), which provides that a person named in an extradition warrant issued in any state may be arrested in accordance with that warrant in another state. Upon apprehension, that person must be brought before a magistrate of the state in which they were apprehended along with the warrant or a copy of the warrant. The local jurisdiction has priority in respect of offences committed in that jurisdiction so that a person charged or in prison in the jurisdiction must be processed and serve time before extradition to the other state.

== International extradition ==
The Extradition Act 1988 sets out the requirements that must be met before Australia can make or accept an extradition request, which may be supplemented or varied by requirements contained in a multilateral or bilateral treaty. One of the requirements is that the offence in the other country is not minor. The Act also ratifies a number of treaties to which Australia is a party, either in the right of the Commonwealth of Australia, by being bound by treaties which the United Kingdom executed on behalf of the Commonwealth of Australia, or multilateral treaties to which Australia is a signatory. Australian law also prohibits anyone from being extradited to another country if they could be sentenced to death in the requesting country.

The absence of an extradition treaty does not, in theory, prevent the arrest or extradition to or from another country e.g. through the London Scheme for Commonwealth member states, or through regulation (e.g., Cambodia). Extradition between Australia and New Zealand is governed by a separate and distinct regime, known as the "backing of warrants" system.

The federal Attorney-General's Department is Australia's central authority for international extradition matters, except that extradition between Australia and New Zealand is administered by police forces and prosecuting authorities in Australia and New Zealand.

=== Map of Countries ===
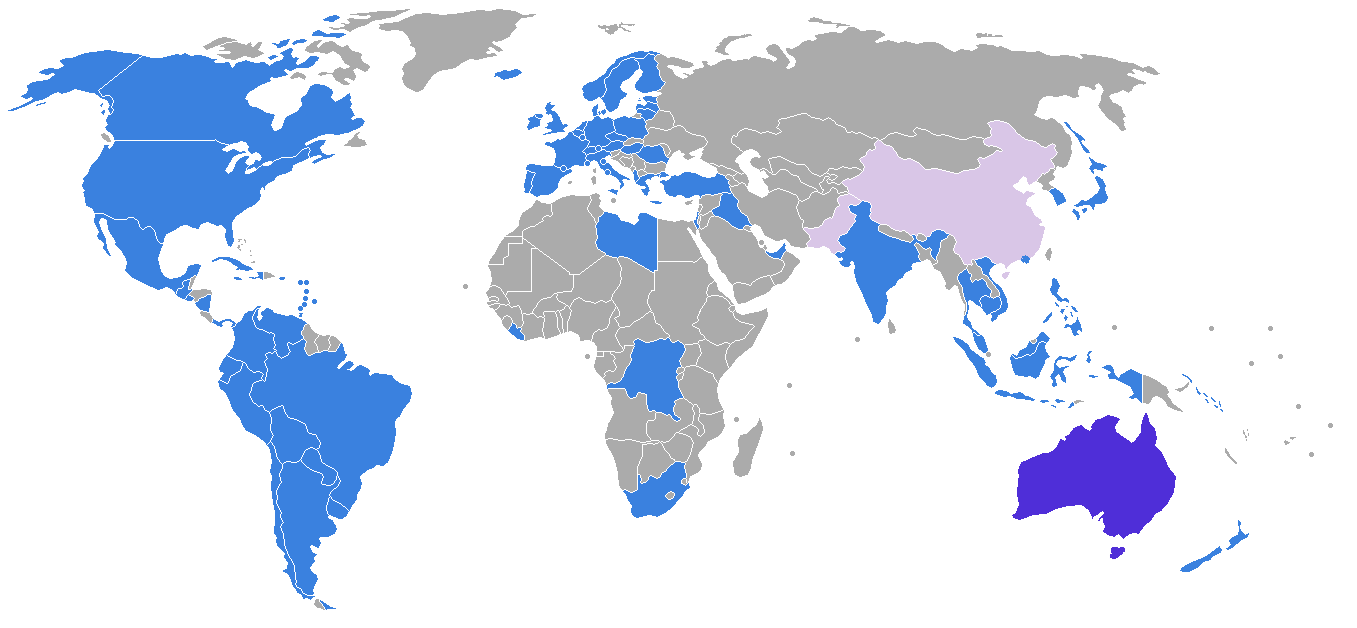
Commonwealth of Australia (shown in purple) has extradition treaties with the countries shown in blue. Light purple indicates a proposal for one has been made. (As of June 2020: although, note Singapore is not included despite there being a treaty by way of The London Scheme)

=== Countries with which Australia has extradition arrangements ===
According to the Attorney-General, Australia has extradition arrangements with the following countries:

- Through bilateral extradition treaties:
  Argentina, Austria, Belgium, Brazil, Chile, Ecuador, Finland, France, Germany, Greece, Hungary, India, Indonesia, Ireland, Israel, Italy, Republic of Korea, Latvia, Luxembourg, Malaysia, Mexico, Monaco, Netherlands, Norway, Paraguay, Philippines, Poland, Portugal, South Africa, Spain, Sweden, Switzerland, Turkey, United Arab Emirates, United States, Uruguay, Venezuela, and Vietnam.
- Through inherited treaties (especially for former colonies etc.):
  Albania, Bolivia, Colombia, Cuba, El Salvador, Guatemala, Haiti, Iraq, Liberia, Nicaragua, Panama, Peru, Romania and San Marino.
- Through backing of warrants:
  New Zealand
- Through the London Scheme (current and former Commonwealth of Nations member states):
  Akrotiri and Dhekelia (the Sovereign base areas on the Island of Cyprus), Anguilla, Antigua and Barbuda, Bahamas, Bangladesh, Barbados, Belize, Bermuda, Botswana, British Antarctic Territory, British Indian Ocean Territory, British Virgin Islands, Brunei Darussalam, Cayman Islands, Cyprus, Dominica, Eswatini, Falkland Islands, Gambia, Ghana, Gibraltar, Grenada, Guyana, Jamaica, Kenya, Lesotho, Malawi, Maldives, Malta, Mauritius, Montserrat, Namibia, Nigeria, Pakistan, Pitcairn, Henderson, Ducie and Oeno Islands, Seychelles, Sierra Leone, Singapore, South Georgia and South Sandwich Islands, Sri Lanka, Saint Helena, St Kitts and Nevis, St Lucia, St Vincent and the Grenadines, Tanzania, Trinidad and Tobago, Turks and Caicos Islands, Uganda, Zambia and Zimbabwe
- Through regulations (not treaty based):
  Bosnia and Herzegovina, Cambodia, Canada, Cook Islands, Croatia, Czech Republic, Denmark, Estonia, Fiji, Iceland, Japan, Jordan, Kiribati, Kyrgyzstan, Lebanon, Lithuania, North Macedonia, Marshall Islands, Montenegro, Nauru, Papua New Guinea, Serbia, Slovakia, Slovenia, Solomon Islands, Thailand, Tonga, Tuvalu, United Kingdom, Vanuatu and Western Samoa.

=== Countries with which Australia has proposed extradition agreements ===
Countries with which Australia is negotiating extradition treaties:

- Pakistan - treaty signed on 16 March 2000 not yet in force.
- China - plans shelved in March 2017 because of human rights concerns.

=== Countries with which Australia has suspended extradition agreements ===
Countries with which Australia has suspended extradition treaties:

- Hong Kong - agreement suspended in July 2020 following the passing by China of the Hong Kong national security law.

== See also ==
- Charles Zentai
