= European Convention on Extradition =

1957 multilateral treaty

- States that signed and ratified the convention (March 2022) Members of the Council of Europe Non-members of the Council of Europe
- Signed: 13 December 1957
- Location: Paris, France
- Effective: 18 April 1960
- Parties: 51 (all member states of the Council of Europe, Chile, Israel, Russia, South Africa and South Korea)
- Depositary: Secretary General of the Council of Europe
- Languages: English and French

The European Convention on Extradition is a multilateral treaty on extradition drawn in 1957 up by the member states of the Council of Europe and in force between all of them. The convention is also available for signature by non-members which as of January 2012 are Chile, Israel, Russia, South Africa and South Korea. Prior to the introduction of the European Arrest Warrant, the Convention governed extradition between member states of the European Union.

There are 4 additional protocols to the convention that vary the conditions signed up to by individual states.

== See also ==
- List of Council of Europe treaties
