= Double criminality =

Legal requirement

Double criminality, or dual criminality, is a requirement in the extradition law and international prisoner transfers of many countries. It states that a suspect can be extradited from one country to stand trial for breaking a second country's law only if a similar law exists in the extraditing country, and in order to receive any internationally transferred prisoners, the crime in the sentencing (receiving) country must also be a crime in the sending country.

If Country A has no laws against blasphemy, for example, a lack of double criminality could prevent a suspect from being extradited from Country A to face blasphemy charges in another country, i.e. no outbound extradition from Country A, and neither are citizens of Country A eligible for international prisoner transfers from another country having criminally convicted them for blasphemy, i.e. no inbound prisoner transfer to Country A.

== European Union ==
In accordance with Article 2(2) of the European Council Framework Decision 2002/584/JHA, the offences listed in that provision allow each EU member state to request a suspect (called a 'requested person') their 'surrender between judicial authorities' (the EU term that replaced extradition) pursuant to a European arrest warrant, without verification of the double criminality of the act.

The only condition is that the offences they are suspected of ‘are punishable in the issuing Member State by a [sentence of] at least three years and as they are defined by the law of the issuing Member State’.

The list, which includes 32 categories of offences, was the subject of a court case before the European Court of Justice. The plaintiffs (a lawyers' organization) alleged that because it includes 'vague and imprecise' wording, such as "computer-related crime", "racism and xenophobia" or "counterfeiting and piracy of products" it breached or was at least capable of breaching the principle of legality in criminal matters.

The court, however, dismissed the legality objections on the ground that the precise definition, of those offences and their penalty, was a matter for the national law of each of the (at the time 27) issuing Member States and therefore the legality principle was not a concern for the European Council.

It ruled that the abolition of the double criminality requirement was justified on the grounds of:

1. the principle of mutual recognition,
2. in the light of the "high degree of trust and solidarity between the Member States", and
3. (inherently or simply because the 3+ years of punishment in the law) the categories of offences are of a seriousness which may affect public order and public safety and justifies dispensing with the verification of double criminality.

== Hong Kong ==
See Fugitive Offenders and Mutual Legal Assistance in Criminal Matters Legislation (Amendment) Bill 2019.

A proposed Hong Kong extradition ordinance tabled in April 2019, which would ease extradition to the Mainland, includes 37 types of crimes. While the Government maintains that the proposal contains protections of the dual criminality requirement, its opponents allege that after people are surrendered to the Mainland authorities, it can charge them with some other crime and impose the death penalty for that other crime. There are also concerns about the retroactive effect of the new law.

The government's proposal was later amended to remove the categories after complaints from the business sector, such as "the unlawful use of computers".

Experts have noted that the legal systems of mainland China and Hong Kong follow 'different protocols' with regard to the important conditions of double criminality and non-refoulement, as well as on the matter of executive vs. judicial oversight on any extradition request.

== United States ==
Double criminality is a requirement in extradition procedures and international prisoner transfers to and from the United States, as extradition and prisoner transfer are allowed only for offenses that are alleged as crimes in both jurisdictions.
