= Comprehensive Convention on International Terrorism =

Proposed treaty to criminalize international terrorism

The Comprehensive Convention on International Terrorism (CCIT) is a proposed treaty which intends to criminalize all forms of international terrorism and deny terrorists, their financiers and supporters access to funds, arms, and safe havens.

The convention has been under negotiation by the United Nations General Assembly's Ad Hoc Committee established by Resolution 51/210 of 17 December 1996 on Terrorism and the United Nations General Assembly Sixth Committee (Legal), but as of 2021 consensus has not yet been reached for the adoption of the convention.

== Early progress ==
India proposed this convention in 1996. The UN General Assembly's Ad Hoc Committee established by Resolution 51/210 of 17 December 1996 on Terrorism and the General Assembly Sixth Committee (Legal) have been undertaking negotiations since 1997.

Although consensus has not yet been reached for the wording of the comprehensive terrorism convention, discussions have yielded three separate protocols that aim to tackle terrorism: International Convention for the Suppression of Terrorist Bombings, adopted on 15 December 1997; International Convention for the Suppression of the Financing of Terrorism, adopted on 9 December 1999; and International Convention for the Suppression of Acts of Nuclear Terrorism, adopted on 13 April 2005.

== Deadlock ==
The negotiations of the Comprehensive Terrorism Convention are deadlocked because of differences over the definition of terrorism. Thalif Deen described the situation as follows: "The key sticking points in the draft treaty revolve around several controversial yet basic issues, including the definition of 'terrorism'. For example, what distinguishes a "terrorist organisation" from a 'liberation movement'? And do you exclude activities of national armed forces, even if they are perceived to commit acts of terrorism? If not, how much of this constitutes 'state terrorism'?"

India has been pushing for the treaty consistently, particularly in the wake of the 2008 Mumbai attacks. The Indian Prime Minister, Narendra Modi, once again raised the topic in his address at the 69th Session of the UN General Assembly held in September 2014, and India’s permanent representative at the GA, Syed Akbaruddin, further pressed for the adoption of CCIT following the July 2016 Dhaka attack. At the 16th BRICS Summit as well, Modi, pushed for early adoption of the CCIT.

=== Current progress ===
At the BRICS session on Peace and Security during the 17th BRICS Summit, the leaders of member states amplified India’s concerns on terrorism called for the expeditious finalization and adoption of the CCIT in the UN framework."

The UNGA Ad Hoc Committee with multi-stage mandate fulfilled this initial mandate, leading to the adoption of the International Convention for the Suppression of Terrorist Bombings in 1997 and the International Convention for the Suppression of Acts of Nuclear Terrorism in 2005.-

Since the year 2000, the draft convention, based on the initial text submitted by India, has been under negotiation within the Ad Hoc Committee and, more recently, within a Working Group of the Sixth Committee (Legal) of the General Assembly, which convenes annually during the UNGA's main session. The item is consistently placed on the Sixth Committee's agenda under the title "Measures to eliminate international terrorism"

The proceedings of the 77th and 78th sessions of the General Assembly set the immediate context for the most recent developments and demonstrate the cyclical nature of the debate.

77th Session (2022); During this session, the Sixth Committee once again established a working group to continue discussions on the draft CCIT. The debate featured statements from 82 delegations, which largely reiterated their long-held positions on the outstanding issues, particularly the definition of terrorism and the scope of the convention as outlined in Draft Article 18. The session concluded with the adoption of General Assembly resolution 77/113 on 7 December 2022, which, in the absence of a breakthrough, decided to carry the item forward and recommended the establishment of a new working group at the 78th session.

The 78th Session (2023)- The Sixth Committee considered "Measures to eliminate international terrorism" as Agenda item 109 during meetings held on 2, 3, and 4 October and on 8 and 17 November 2023. Pursuant to the previous year's resolution, a Working Group was established and convened for two meetings on 17 October and 3 November 2023. On 8 November 2023, the Chair of the Working Group delivered an oral report to the Committee, summarizing the informal consultations. The report confirmed that while delegations expressed continued interest in reaching an agreement, the fundamental differences on the outstanding issues remained unresolved. Consequently, the session concluded with the adoption of resolution 78/115 on 9 December 2023, which rolled the mandate over to the 79th session in 2024.

During the 79th Session in 2024, India suggested that the definition of terrorism contained in UN Security Council Resolution 1566 (2004) could serve as a basis for further discussion, indicating an openness to exploring alternative pathways to consensus. The annual exercise is a procedural necessity to keep the CCIT on the active agenda of the United Nations, but it lacks the political impetus for a genuine breakthrough, resulting in a diplomatic inertia. The primary function of these sessions has shifted from active negotiation to a yearly "temperature check," where states signal their unchanged red lines while also articulating their evolving priorities on the broader counter-terrorism file, such as the rise of new extremist ideologies or the challenges of online radicalization. The 79th Session of the UN General Assembly in 2024 continued this established pattern, providing the most current snapshot of the state of play regarding the CCIT.

The Sixth Committee addressed "Measures to eliminate international terrorism" as Agenda item 110 at the UN Headquarters in New York. The main debate on the item took place during meetings on 2, 3, and 4 October, with further procedural meetings on 8 and 22 November 2024. As mandated by GA resolution 78/115, a Working Group was established with the formal objective of "finalizing the process on the draft comprehensive convention on international terrorism". The Working Group held two meetings, on 11 October and 5 November 2024, to conduct informal consultations on the draft convention and the related question of convening a high-level conference. On 8 November 2024, the Sixth Committee heard and took note of the oral report from the Chair of the Working Group.

On 2 October 2024, The EU delivered a comprehensive statement highlighting the evolving nature of the terrorist threat, pointing specifically to the resurgence of ISIL-Khorasan (ISIL-K). The EU reaffirmed its strong commitment to finalizing the CCIT and deplored the increasing politicization of the issue. Notably, the statement referenced the "Pact for the Future," adopted at the Summit of the Future in September 2024, as a potential new impetus to revitalize the stalled negotiations. Further, on 4 October 2025, India's statement expressed frustration that, after nearly 30 years, consensus on the CCIT remains elusive due to "narrow differences". Echoing the EU, India also pointed to the "Pact of the Future" as a renewed opportunity to urge member states to "end the stalemate". India reiterated its call for the early finalization of the draft convention and again proposed that the definition of international terrorism found in UN Security Council Resolution 1566 (2004) could serve as a productive basis for further discussion.

Then, On 22 November 2024, the Sixth Committee adopted a new draft resolution on the agenda item without a vote. The primary effect of this resolution is, once again, procedural. It formally recognizes the work done during the 79th session, acknowledges the lack of consensus on the outstanding issues, and recommends that the General Assembly include the item on the agenda of its 80th session in 2025.

== Proposed definition of terrorism ==
Being a criminal law instrument, the definition of terrorism to be included in the proposed Convention must have, in the words of coordinator of negotiations Carlos Diaz-Paniagua, the necessary "legal precision, certainty, and fair-labeling of the criminal conduct – all which emanate from the basic human rights obligation to observe due process".

The definition of the crime of terrorism which has been on the negotiating table of the Comprehensive Convention since 2002 reads as follows:

1. Any person commits an offence within the meaning of this Convention if that person, by any means, unlawfully and intentionally, causes:

(a) Death or serious bodily injury to any person; or
(b) Serious damage to public or private property, including a place of public use, a State or government facility, a public transportation system, an infrastructure facility or the environment; or
(c) Damage to property, places, facilities, or systems referred to in paragraph1 (b) of this article, resulting or likely to result in major economic loss, when the purpose of the conduct, by its nature or context, is to intimidate a population, or to compel a Government or an international organization to do or abstain from doing any act.

=== 2002 proposed amendments ===
This definition is not controversial in itself; the deadlock in the negotiations arises instead from the opposing views on whether such a definition would be applicable to the armed forces of a state and to self-determination movements.

The coordinator of the negotiations, supported by most western delegations, proposed the following exceptions to address those issues:

1. Nothing in this Convention shall affect other rights, obligations and responsibilities of States, peoples and individuals under international law, in particular the purposes and principles of the Charter of the United Nations, and international humanitarian law.

2. The activities of armed forces during an armed conflict, as those terms are understood under international humanitarian law, which are governed by that law, are not governed by this Convention.

3. The activities undertaken by the military forces of a State in the exercise of their official duties, inasmuch as they are governed by other rules of international law, are not governed by this Convention.

4. Nothing in this article condones or makes lawful otherwise unlawful acts, nor precludes prosecution under other laws.

The state members of the Organisation of the Islamic Conference proposed instead the following exceptions:

2. The activities of the parties during an armed conflict, including in situations of foreign occupation, as those terms are understood under international humanitarian law, which are governed by that law, are not governed by this Convention. 3. The activities undertaken by the military forces of a State in the exercise of their official duties, inasmuch as they are in conformity with international law, are not governed by this Convention.

== Positions of member states ==
=== India ===
India is the country which had raised consistent voice for the Comprehensive Convention on International Terrorism, which it introduced in U.N.G.A. in 1996. Yedla Umasankar, India's representative at U.N in 2018 said that terrorists’ groups like Al-Qaeda and Lashkar-e-Taiba and the transnational links and financing mean no country can remain immune. India has consistently rejected arguments that seek to shield certain violent acts under the guise of self-determination. Its position is rooted in its own experience with cross-border terrorism, particularly in Kashmir and other regions. India argues that any ambiguity in the definition of terrorism would only embolden non-state actors and undermine global consensus.

Further, he also argued that comprehensive convention would provide a strong legal basis against terrorism. At 77th session of sixth committee at UNGA, India called for “zero tolerance policy” towards terrorism. It pressed the member states to quickly adopt CCIT to strengthen frameworks against terrorism from this law instrument, the spokesperson Dr. Kajal Bhat, stated that there can be no exception or justification for any act of terrorism. India reiterated the same position during the sixth committee of the 78th session at the UNGA.

=== China ===
China's position aligned with various members call for a global treaty against terrorism. China endorsed that it has and will take an active part in the formulation of CCIT. This has been reiterated at 2015 China& India joint statement and called for early conclusion on CCIT. The spokesperson also stated that to fight against all forms of terrorism for international peace.

China's position underlines its broader diplomatic strategy of supporting multilateralism and global legal instruments. It supports India's proposal while maintaining a careful diplomatic balance in addressing the concerns of other global blocs. Further, the Chinese envoy stated that the shall be no double standards against terrorism and said that there is no good or bad terrorist, terrorism no matter what and when, it should be stopped.

=== Pakistan ===
Pakistan positioned itself at the Sixth Committee as a victim suffering from terrorism. They are supportive of an international treaty. It reiterated the position of Saudi Arabia representing Organisation of Islamic Countries and Iran on behalf of Non-Aligned Movement (NAM) that CCIT should differentiate between acts of terrorism and legitimate struggles for self-determination against foreign occupation. Further, Arab diplomats also called for the inclusion of state terrorism.

=== United States ===
The United States also condemned terrorism in all forms but urged careful deliberation over the definition in CCIT. United States Position is it is against the inclusion of the self-determination as an exception in CCIT. A 2005 statement by U.S. spokesperson Robert O’Brien signalled that opportunity to conclude CCIT should not be missed and said that U.S. was ready to accept an introductory paragraph on self-determination. However, he argued that attacks on World Trade Centre on September 11, 2009, attacks on Moscow subway, London bombings were not because of self-determination but by a global insurgency against international system. It also deliberates on whether the question of armed forces using power amounts to terrorism.

=== European Union ===
The European Union consistently working and collaborating for the definition of terrorism in CCIT, as it came to a consensual definition and framework, in EU Directive on Combating Terrorism, which they adopted in 2017. India and EU jointly declared to intensify efforts to bring negotiation close on CCIT, but they are insisting on a clear definition of terrorism adhering to international humanitarian law.

== Recent meetings ==
At the first meeting of the 73rd General Assembly session of the Sixth Committee in October 2018, speakers from around the world reported that the failure to agree on the comprehensive convention had hindered efforts to combat terrorism. All supported efforts to conclude the process as quickly as possible, with some raising concern about specific issues, such as conflating terrorism with the legitimate aspirations for self-determination.

== See also ==
- International conventions on terrorism
