= Definition of terrorism =

There is no legal or scientific consensus on the definition of terrorism. Various legal systems and government agencies use different definitions of terrorism, and governments have been reluctant to formulate an agreed-upon legally binding definition. Difficulties arise from the fact that the term has become politically and emotionally charged. A simple definition proposed to the United Nations Commission on Crime Prevention and Criminal Justice (CCPCJ) by terrorism studies scholar Alex P. Schmid in 1992, based on the already internationally accepted definition of war crimes, as "peacetime equivalents of war crimes", was not accepted.

Scholars have worked on creating various academic definitions, reaching a consensus definition published by Schmid and A. J. Jongman in 1988, with a longer revised version published by Schmid in 2011, some years after he had written that "the price for consensus [had] led to a reduction of complexity". The Cambridge History of Terrorism (2021), however, states that Schmid's "consensus" resembles an intersection of definitions, rather than a bona fide consensus.

The United Nations General Assembly condemned terrorist acts by using the following political description of terrorism in December 1994 (GA Res. 49/60):

Criminal acts intended or calculated to provoke a state of terror in the general public, a group of persons or particular persons for political purposes are in any circumstance unjustifiable, whatever the considerations of a political, philosophical, ideological, racial, ethnic, religious or any other nature that may be invoked to justify them.

== Etymology ==
A 30 January 1795 use of the word 'terrorism' in The Times, an early appearance in English. The excerpt reads: "There exists more than one system to overthrow our liberty. Fanaticism has raised every passion; Royalism has not yet given up its hopes, and Terrorism feels bolder than ever."

The term "terrorism" comes from French terrorisme, from Latin: terror, "great fear", "dread", related to the Latin verb terrere, "to frighten".

The French National Convention declared in September 1793 that "terror is the order of the day". The period 1793–94 is referred to as La Terreur (Reign of Terror). Maximilien Robespierre, a leader in the French Revolution proclaimed in 1794 that "Terror is nothing other than justice, prompt, severe, inflexible." The Committee of Public Safety agents that enforced the policies of "The Terror" were referred to as "Terrorists". The word "terrorism" was first recorded in English-language dictionaries in 1798 as meaning "systematic use of terror as a policy". Following the Thermidorian Reaction of late July 1794, the term was used with the suffix in a debate in the post-Montagnard National Convention by deputy and plotter Jean-Lambert Tallien on August 28, one month after Robespierre's fall, terrorisme. It had by then already been used by political theorist Pierre Louis Roederer.

Following the Reign of Terror context, which was imposed (or caused, as in actions such as those of Jean-Baptiste Carrier) by the French government, in modern times "terrorism" typically refers to the killing of people by non-governmental political activists for political reasons, often as a public statement. This meaning originated with Russian radicals in the 1870s. Sergey Nechayev, who founded the People's Reprisal (Народная расправа) in 1869, described himself as a "terrorist". German radicalist writer Johann Most helped popularize the modern sense of the word by dispensing "advice for terrorists" in the 1880s.

According to Myra Williamson (2009): "The meaning of 'terrorism' has undergone a transformation. During the reign of terror a regime or system of terrorism was used as an instrument of governance, wielded by a recently established revolutionary state against the enemies of the people. Now the term 'terrorism' is commonly used to describe terrorist acts committed by non-state or subnational entities against a state".

== Notable definitions of terrorism ==
Definitions include:

- "the deliberate killing of innocent people, at random, to spread fear through a whole population and force the hand of its political leaders" (Michael Walzer, 2002).
- "the organized use of violence to attack non-combatants ('innocents' in a special sense) or their property for political purposes" (C. A. J. Coady, 2004).
- "the deliberate use of violence, or threat of its use, against innocent people, with the aim of intimidating some other people into a course of action they otherwise would not take" (Igor Primoratz, 2004).
- "the use of force or violence or the threat of force or violence to change the behavior of society as a whole through the causation of fear and the targeting of specific parts of society in order to affect the entire society" (Arthur H. Garrison, 2004).
- "The premeditated use or threat to use violence by individuals or subnational groups to obtain a political or social objective through the intimidation of a large audience beyond that of the immediate victims" (Todd Sandler, 2010).
- "a doctrine about the presumed effectiveness of a special form or tactic of fear-generating, coercive political violence... [as well as] a conspiratorial practice of calculated, demonstrative, direct violent action without legal or moral restraints, targeting mainly civilians and non-combatants, performed for its propagandistic and psychological effects on various audiences and conflict parties" (Schmid, 2011).

Bruce Hoffman notes that terrorism is "ineluctably about power".

== General criteria ==
Terrorism has been described as:

- The use of violence or of the threat of violence in the pursuit of political objectives
- Acts committed by non-state actors (or by undercover personnel serving on the behalf of their respective governments)
- The intentional use of lethal force against civilians, and/or destructive force against civilian areas, buildings or infrastructure.
- Acts reaching more than the immediate target victims and also directed at targets consisting of a larger spectrum of society
- Both mala prohibita (i.e., crime that is made illegal by legislation) and mala in se (i.e., crime that is inherently immoral or wrong)

Definitions of terrorism typically emphasize one or more of the following features:

1. Its effect of extreme fear
2. Whether it targeted the state from within
3. Its strategic goals
4. Its random or indiscriminate nature
5. Who it targeted
6. Whether it was planned and prepared in secret

The following criteria of violence or threat of violence usually fall outside of the definition of terrorism:

- Wartime (including a declared war) or peacetime acts of violence committed by a nation state against another nation state regardless of legality or illegality and are carried out by properly uniformed forces or legal combatants of such nation states
- Reasonable acts of self-defense, such as the use of force to kill, apprehend, or punish criminals who pose a threat to the lives of humans or property
- Legitimate targets in war, such as enemy combatants and strategic infrastructure that form an integral part of the enemy's war effort such as defense industries and ports
- Collateral damage, including the infliction of incidental damage to non-combatant targets during an attack on or attempting to attack legitimate targets in war

Scholar Ken Duncan argues the term terrorism has generally been used to describe violence by non-state actors rather than government violence since the 19th-century Anarchist Movement.

== In international law ==
=== The need to define terrorism in international criminal law ===
Schmid (2004) summarised many sources when he wrote: "It is widely agreed that international terrorism can only be fought by international cooperation". If states do not agree on what constitutes terrorism, the chances of cooperation between countries is reduced; for example, agreement is needed so that extradition is possible.

Ben Saul has noted (2008): "A combination of pragmatic and principled arguments supports the case for defining terrorism in international law". Reasons for why terrorism needs to be defined by the international community include the need to condemn violations to human rights; to protect the state and its constitutional order, which protects rights; to differentiate public and private violence; to ensure international peace and security, and "control the operation of mandatory Security Council measures since 2001".

Carlos Diaz-Paniagua, who coordinated the negotiations of the proposed United Nations Comprehensive Convention on International Terrorism (proposed in 1996 and not yet achieved), noted in 2008 the need to provide a precise definition of terrorist activities in international law: "Criminal law has three purposes: to declare that a conduct is forbidden, to prevent it, and to express society's condemnation for the wrongful acts. The symbolic, normative role of criminalization is of particular importance in the case of terrorism. The criminalization of terrorist acts expresses society's repugnance at them, invokes social censure and shame, and stigmatizes those who commit them. Moreover, by creating and reaffirming values, criminalization may serve, in the long run, as a deterrent to terrorism, as those values are internalized." Thus, international criminal law treaties that seek to prevent, condemn and punish terrorist activities, require precise definitions:

The definition of the offence in criminal law treaty plays several roles. First and foremost, it has the symbolic, normative role of expressing society's condemnation of the forbidden acts. Second, it facilitates agreement. Since states tend to be reluctant to undertake stringent obligations in matters related to the exercise of their domestic jurisdiction, a precise definition of the crime, which restricts the scope of those obligations, makes agreement less costly. Third, it provides an inter-subjective basis for the homogeneous application of the treaty's obligations on judicial and police cooperation. This function is of particular importance in extradition treaties because, to grant an extradition, most legal systems require that the crime be punishable both in the requesting state and the requested state. Fourth, it helps states to enact domestic legislation to criminalize and punish the wrongful acts defined in the treaty in conformity with their human rights' obligations. The principle of nullum crimen sine lege requires, in particular, that states define precisely which acts are prohibited before anyone can be prosecuted or punished for committing those same acts.

Saul noted in this sense that, missing a generally agreed, all-encompassing, definition of the term:

'Terrorism' currently lacks the precision, objectivity and certainty demanded by legal discourse. Criminal law strives to avoid emotive terms to prevent prejudice to an accused, and shuns ambiguous or subjective terms as incompatible with the principle of non-retroactivity. If the law is to admit the term, advance definition is essential on grounds of fairness, and it is not sufficient to leave definition to the unilateral interpretations of States. Legal definition could plausibly retrieve terrorism from the ideological quagmire, by severing an agreed legal meaning from the remainder of the elastic, political concept. Ultimately it must do so without criminalizing legitimate violent resistance to oppressive regimes – and becoming complicit in that oppression.

==== Obstacles to a comprehensive definition ====
There are many reasons for the failure to achieve universal consensus regarding the definition of terrorism, not least that it is such a "complex and multidimensional phenomenon". In addition, the term has been used broadly, to describe so many different incidents and events that scholar Louise Richardson has said that the term "has become so widely used in many contexts as to become almost meaningless". An analysis of 73 different definitions in 2004 came up with only five common elements, which excluded any reference to victims, fear/terror, motive, non-combatant targets or the criminal nature of the tactics used.

Historically, the dispute on the meaning of terrorism arose since the laws of war were first codified in 1899. The Martens Clause was introduced as a compromise wording for the dispute between the Great Powers who considered francs-tireurs to be unlawful combatants subject to execution on capture, and smaller states who maintained that they should be considered lawful combatants.

More recently the 1977 Protocol Additional to the Geneva Conventions of 12 August 1949, and relating to the Protection of Victims of International Armed Conflicts, which applies in situations Article 1. Paragraph 4 "... in which peoples are fighting against colonial domination and alien occupation and against racist regimes...", contains many ambiguities that cloud the issue of who is or is not a legitimate combatant.

In a briefing paper for the Australian Parliament in 2002, Angus Martyn stated:

The international community has never succeeded in developing an accepted comprehensive definition of terrorism. During the 1970s and 1980s, the United Nations attempts to define the term floundered mainly due to differences of opinion between various members about the use of violence in the context of conflicts over national liberation and self-determination.

Diaz-Paniagua (2008) has noted that, to "create an effective legal regime against terrorism, it would be necessary to formulate a comprehensive definition of that crime that, on the one hand, provides the strongest moral condemnation to terrorist activities while, on the other hand, has enough precision to permit the prosecution of criminal activities without condemning acts that should be deemed to be legitimate". Nonetheless, due to major divergences at the international level on the question of the legitimacy of the use of violence for political purposes, either by states or by self-determination and revolutionary groups, this has not yet been possible." In this sense, M. Cherif Bassiouni (1988) notes:

to define 'terrorism' in a way that is both all-inclusive and unambiguous is very difficult, if not impossible. One of the principle difficulties lies in the fundamental values at stake in the acceptance or rejection of terror-inspiring violence as means of accomplishing a given goal. The obvious and well known range of views on these issues are what makes an internationally accepted specific definition of what is loosely called 'terrorism,' a largely impossible undertaking. That is why the search for and internationally agreed upon definition may well be a futile and unnecessary effort.

Sami Zeidan, a diplomat and scholar, explained the political reasons underlying the current difficulties to define terrorism as follows (2004):

There is no general consensus on the definition of terrorism. The difficulty of defining terrorism lies in the risk it entails of taking positions. The political value of the term currently prevails over its legal one. Left to its political meaning, terrorism easily falls prey to change that suits the interests of particular states at particular times. The Taliban and Osama bin Laden were once called freedom fighters (mujahideen) and backed by the CIA when they were resisting the Soviet occupation of Afghanistan. Now they are on top of the international terrorist lists. Today, the United Nations views Palestinians as freedom fighters, struggling against the unlawful occupation of their land by Israel, and engaged in a long-established legitimate resistance, yet Israel regards them as terrorists [...] The repercussion of the current preponderance of the political over the legal value of terrorism is costly, leaving the war against terrorism selective, incomplete and ineffective.

In the same vein, Jason Burke (2003), a British reporter who writes about radical Islamist activity, said:

There are multiple ways of defining terrorism, and all are subjective. Most define terrorism as "the use or threat of serious violence" to advance some kind of "cause". Some state clearly the kinds of group ("sub-national", "non-state") or cause (political, ideological, religious) to which they refer. Others merely rely on the instinct of most people when confronted with innocent civilians being killed or maimed by men armed with explosives, firearms or other weapons. None is satisfactory, and grave problems with the use of the term persist. Terrorism is after all, a tactic. The term "war on terrorism" is thus effectively nonsensical. As there is no space here to explore this involved and difficult debate, my preference is, on the whole, for the less loaded term "Militancy". This is not an attempt to condone such actions, merely to analyse them in a clearer way.

The political and emotional connotation of the term "terrorism" makes difficult its use in legal discourse. In this sense, Saul (2004) notes that:

Despite the shifting and contested meaning of "terrorism" over time, the peculiar semantic power of the term, beyond its literal signification, is its capacity to stigmatize, delegitimize, denigrate, and dehumanize those at whom it is directed, including political opponents. The term is ideologically and politically loaded; pejorative; implies moral, social, and value judgment; and is "slippery and much-abused." In the absence of a definition of terrorism, the struggle over the representation of a violent act is a struggle over its legitimacy. The more confused a concept, the more it lends itself to opportunistic appropriation.

As scholar Bruce Hoffman (1998) has noted: "terrorism is a pejorative term. It is a word with intrinsically negative connotations that is generally applied to one's enemies and opponents, or to those with whom one disagrees and would otherwise prefer to ignore. (...) Hence the decision to call someone or label some organization 'terrorist' becomes almost unavoidably subjective, depending largely on whether one sympathizes with or opposes the person/group/cause concerned. If one identifies with the victim of the violence, for example, then the act is terrorism. If, however, one identifies with the perpetrator, the violent act is regarded in a more sympathetic, if not positive (or, at the worst, an ambivalent) light; and it is not terrorism." For this and for political reasons, many news sources (such as Reuters) avoid using this term, opting instead for less accusatory words like "bombers", "militants", etc.

The term has been depicted as carrying racist, xenophobic and ethnocentric connotations when used as an ethnic slur aimed at Arabs or Middle Easterners, or at someone of Arab or Greater Middle Eastern descent or when used by white supremacists.

These difficulties led Pamala Griset (2003) to conclude that: "the meaning of terrorism is embedded in a person's or nation's philosophy. Thus, the determination of the 'right' definition of terrorism is subjective".

While discussing the definitional and ethical difficulties of terrorism, philosopher Jenny Teichman argues that "it ought not to be impossible to find an agreed definition, and then ask whether one wants to condemn or applaud all or some of the things that fall under that description". Experts disagree on "whether terrorism is wrong by definition or just wrong as a matter of fact; they disagree about whether terrorism should be defined in terms of its aims, or its methods, or both, or neither; they disagree about whether states can perpetrate terrorism; they even disagree about the importance or otherwise of terror for a definition of terrorism".

==== The sectoral approach ====
To elaborate an effective legal regime to prevent and punish international terrorism—rather than only working on a single, all-encompassing, comprehensive definition of terrorism—the international community has also adopted a "...'sectoral' approach aimed at identifying offences seen as belonging to the activities of terrorists and working out treaties in order to deal with specific categories thereof". The treaties that follow this approach focus on the wrongful nature of terrorist activities rather than on their intent:

On the whole, therefore, the 'sectoral' conventions confirm the assumption that some offences can be considered in themselves as offences of international concern, irrespective of any 'terrorist' intent or purpose. Indeed, the principal merit of the 'sectoral approach' is that it avoids the need to define 'terrorism' of 'terrorist acts' ... So long as the 'sectoral' approach is followed, there is no need to define terrorism; a definition would only be necessary if the punishment of the relevant offences were made conditional on the existence of a specific 'terrorist' intent; but this would be counter-productive, inasmuch as it would result in unduly restricting their suppression.

Following this approach, the international community adopted 12 sectoral counter-terrorism conventions, open to the ratification of all states, between 1963 and 2005 (see below), relating to types of acts (such as aboard an aircraft, taking hostages, bombings, nuclear terrorism, etc.).

Analyzing these treaties, Andrew Byrnes observed that:

These conventions – all of which are described by the United Nations as part of its panoply of anti-terrorist measures – share three principal characteristics:

(a) they all adopted an "operational definition" of a specific type of terrorist act that was defined without reference to the underlying political or ideological purpose or motivation of the perpetrator of the act – this reflected a consensus that there were some acts that were such a serious threat to the interests of all that they could not be justified by reference to such motives;

(b) they all focused on actions by non-state actors (individuals and organisations) and the State was seen as an active ally in the struggle against terrorism – the question of the State itself as terrorist actor was left largely to one side; and

(c) they all adopted a criminal law enforcement model to address the problem, under which States would cooperate in the apprehension and prosecution of those alleged to have committed these crimes.

Byrnes notes that "this act-specific approach to addressing problems of terrorism in binding international treaties has continued up until relatively recently. Although political denunciation of terrorism in all its forms had continued apace, there had been no successful attempt to define 'terrorism' as such in a broad sense that was satisfactory for legal purposes. There was also some scepticism as to the necessity, desirability and feasibility of producing an agreed and workable general definition." Nonetheless, the same committee of the United Nations General Assembly which authored the 1997 Bombing Convention and the 1999 Financing Convention has been working on a proposed Comprehensive Convention on International Terrorism, given renewed impetus by the September 11 attacks in 2001.

=== Comprehensive conventions ===
The international community has worked on two comprehensive counter-terrorism treaties, the League of Nations' 1937 Convention for the Prevention and Punishment of Terrorism, which never entered into force, and the United Nations' proposed Comprehensive Convention on International Terrorism, which has not yet been finalized.

==== League of Nations (1930s) ====
In the late 1930s, the international community made a first attempt at defining terrorism. Article 1.1 of the League of Nations' 1937 Convention for the prevention and punishment of Terrorism defined "acts of terrorism" as "criminal acts directed against a State and intended or calculated to create a state of terror in the minds of particular persons or a group of persons or the general public". Article 2 included as terrorist acts, if they were directed against another state and if they constituted acts of terrorism within the meaning of the definition contained in article 1, the following:

1. Any willful act causing death or grievous bodily harm or loss of liberty to:

a) Heads of State, persons exercising the prerogatives of the head of the State, their hereditary or designated successors;
b) The wives or husbands of the above-mentioned persons;
c) Persons charged with public functions or holding public positions when the act is directed against them in their public capacity.

2. Willful destruction of, or damage to, public property or property devoted to a public purpose belonging to or subject to the authority of another High Contracting Party.

3. Any willful act calculated to endanger the lives of members of the public.

4. Any attempt to commit an offence falling within the foregoing provisions of the present article.

5. The manufacture, obtaining, possession, or supplying of arms, ammunition, explosives or harmful substances with the view to the commission in any country whatsoever of an offence falling within the present article.

These articles never entered into force, owing to lack of support.

==== UN Comprehensive Convention (1997–present) ====
Since 1994, the United Nations General Assembly has repeatedly condemned terrorist acts using the following political description of terrorism:

Criminal acts intended or calculated to provoke a state of terror in the public, a group of persons or particular persons for political purposes are in any circumstance unjustifiable, whatever the considerations of a political, philosophical, ideological, racial, ethnic, religious or any other nature that may be invoked to justify them.

In 1996 an Ad Hoc Committee on Terrorism was set up, with the remit of drafting several conventions condemning various aspects of terrorism, with the intention of producing a final Comprehensive Convention which would either supplement or replace the series of sectoral conventions.

Since January 1997, the United Nations General Assembly has been negotiating a Comprehensive Convention on International Terrorism. The definition of the crime of terrorism on the negotiating table reads as follows (GA Resolution 51/210, Declaration to Supplement the 1994 Declaration on Measures to Eliminate International Terrorism, December 1996; adopted January 1997):

1. Any person commits an offence within the meaning of this Convention if that person, by any means, unlawfully and intentionally, causes:

(a) Death or serious bodily injury to any person; or
(b) Serious damage to public or private property, including a place of public use, a State or government facility, a public transportation system, an infrastructure facility or the environment; or
(c) Damage to property, places, facilities, or systems referred to in paragraph 1 (b) of this article, resulting or likely to result in major economic loss, when the purpose of the conduct, by its nature or context, is to intimidate a population, or to compel a Government or an international organization to do or abstain from doing any act.

Among the negotiators, the 1996/7 definition is not controversial in itself; the deadlock in the negotiations arises instead from the opposing views on whether such a definition would be applicable to the armed forces of a state and to self-determination movements. Thalif Deen described the situation as follows: "The key sticking points in the draft treaty revolve around several controversial yet basic issues, including the definition of ´terrorism´. For example, what distinguishes a "terrorist organisation" from a 'liberation movement'? And do you exclude activities of national armed forces, even if they are perceived to commit acts of terrorism? If not, how much of this constitutes 'state terrorism'?"

In 2002, the coordinator of the negotiations, supported by most western delegations, proposed the following exceptions to address those issues:

1. Nothing in this Convention shall affect other rights, obligations and responsibilities of States, peoples and individuals under international law, in particular the purposes and principles of the Charter of the United Nations, and international humanitarian law.

2. The activities of armed forces during an armed conflict, as those terms are understood under international humanitarian law, which are governed by that law, are not governed by this Convention.

3. The activities undertaken by the military forces of a State in the exercise of their official duties, inasmuch as they are governed by other rules of international law, are not governed by this Convention.

4. Nothing in this article condones or makes lawful otherwise unlawful acts, nor precludes prosecution under other laws.

In November 2004, a Secretary-General of the United Nations report described terrorism as any act "intended to cause death or serious bodily harm to civilians or non-combatants with the purpose of intimidating a population or compelling a government or an international organization to do or abstain from doing any act".

The state members of the Organisation of the Islamic Conference proposed instead the following exceptions:

2. The activities of 'the parties' during an armed conflict, 'including in situations of foreign occupation', as those terms are understood under international humanitarian law, which are governed by that law, are not governed by this Convention. 3. The activities undertaken by the military forces of a State in the exercise of their official duties, 'inasmuch as they are in conformity' with international law, are not governed by this Convention.

=== Sectoral conventions (1963–2005) ===
The various sectoral counter-terrorism conventions, or treaties, define as terrorist particular categories of activities. These include:

- The 1963 Convention on Offences and Certain Other Acts Committed On Board Aircraft
- The 1970 Convention for the Suppression of Unlawful Seizure of Aircraft
- The 1971 Convention for the Suppression of Unlawful Acts against the Safety of Civil Aviation
- The 1979 International Convention against the Taking of Hostages
- The 1979 Convention on the Physical Protection of Nuclear Material
- The 1988 Protocol for the Suppression of Unlawful Acts of Violence at Airports Serving International Civil Aviation
- The 1988 Convention for the Suppression of Unlawful Acts against the Safety of Maritime Navigation
- The 1988 Protocol for the Suppression of Unlawful Acts against the Safety of Fixed Platforms Located on the Continental Shelf
- The 1991 Convention on the Marking of Plastic Explosives for the Purpose of Identification
- The 1997 International Convention for the Suppression of Terrorist Bombings
- The 1999 International Convention for the Suppression of the Financing of Terrorism
- The 2005 International Convention for the Suppression of Acts of Nuclear Terrorism

==== 1997: Terrorist Bombings Convention ====
Article 2.1 of the 1997 International Convention for the Suppression of Terrorist Bombings defines the offence of terrorist bombing as follows:

Any person commits an offence within the meaning of this Convention if that person unlawfully and intentionally delivers, places, discharges or detonates an explosive or other lethal device in, into or against a place of public use, a State or government facility, a public transportation system or an infrastructure facility:

a) With the intent to cause death or serious bodily injury; or
b) With the intent to cause extensive destruction of such a place, facility or system, where such a destruction results in or is likely to result in major economic loss.

Article 19 expressly excluded from the scope of the convention certain activities of state armed forces and of self-determination movements as follows:

1. Nothing in this Convention shall affect other rights, obligations and responsibilities of States, and individuals under international law, in particular the purposes and principles of the Charter of the United Nations, and international humanitarian law. 2. The activities of armed forces during an armed conflict, as those terms are understood under international humanitarian law, which are governed by that law, are not governed by this Convention, and the activities undertaken by the military forces of a State in the exercise of their official duties, inasmuch as they are governed by other rules of international law, are not governed by this Convention.

==== 1999: Terrorist Financing Convention ====
Article 2.1 of the 1999 sectoral United Nations International Convention for the Suppression of the Financing of Terrorism (Terrorist Financing Convention) defines the crime of terrorist financing as the offence committed by "any person" who "by any means, directly or indirectly, unlawfully and wilfully, provides or collects funds with the intention that they should be used or in the knowledge that they are to be used, in full or in part, in order to carry out" an act "intended to cause death or serious bodily injury to a civilian, or to any other person not taking an active part in the hostilities in a situation of armed conflict, when the purpose of such act, by its nature or context, is to intimidate a population, or to compel a government or an international organization to do or to abstain from doing any act."

==== 2005: Nuclear Terrorism Convention ====
The 2005 United Nations International Convention for the Suppression of Acts of Nuclear Terrorism defines the crime of nuclear terrorism as follows:

Article 2

1. Any person commits an offence within the meaning of this Convention if that person unlawfully and intentionally: (a) Possesses radioactive material or makes or possesses a device:

(i) With the intent to cause death or serious bodily injury; or
(ii) With the intent to cause substantial damage to property or to the environment;

(b) Uses in any way radioactive material or a device, or uses or damages a nuclear facility in a manner which releases or risks the release of radioactive material:

(i) With the intent to cause death or serious bodily injury; or
(ii) With the intent to cause substantial damage to property or to the environment; or
(iii) With the intent to compel a natural or legal person, an international organization or a State to do or refrain from doing an act.

Article 4 of the convention expressly excluded from the application of the convention the use of nuclear weapons during armed conflicts without, though, recognizing the legality of the use of those weapons:

1. Nothing in this Convention shall affect other rights, obligations and responsibilities of States and individuals under international law, in particular the purposes and principles of the Charter of the United Nations and international humanitarian law.

2. The activities of armed forces during an armed conflict, as those terms are understood under international humanitarian law, which are governed by that law are not governed by this Convention, and the activities undertaken by military forces of a State in the exercise of their official duties, inasmuch as they are governed by other rules of international law, are not governed by this Convention.

3. The provisions of paragraph 2 of the present article shall not be interpreted as condoning or making lawful otherwise unlawful acts, or precluding prosecution under other laws.

4. This Convention does not address, nor can it be interpreted as addressing, in any way, the issue of the legality of the use or threat of use of nuclear weapons by States.

=== Definitions of terrorism in other UN decisions ===
In parallel with the criminal law codification efforts, some United Nations organs have put forward some broad political definitions of terrorism.

The United Nations did not focus any debate on terrorism until 1972, after the terrorist attack at the Olympic Games in Munich.

==== UN General Assembly Resolutions (1972, 1994/6) ====
In 1972 the General Assembly passed a resolution titled "Measures to prevent international terrorism which endangers or takes innocent human lives or jeopardises fundamental freedoms, and study of the underlying causes of those forms of terrorism and acts ofviolence which lie in misery, frustration, grievance and despair, and which cause some people to sacrifice human lives, including their own, in an attempt to effect radical changes". An Ad Hoc Committee on International Terrorism, consisting of three sub-committees, was established, but no consensus was reached on the various draft proposals submitted, and the matter was again put aside until the Cold War had ended (1991).

In 1994, the General Assembly agreed on a declaration that terrorism was "criminal and unjustifiable", condemning all such acts "wherever and by whomever committed", in its Declaration on Measures to Eliminate International Terrorism (GA Res. 49/60).

A 1996 non-binding United Nations Declaration to Supplement the 1994 Declaration on Measures to Eliminate International Terrorism (which described terrorism as "Criminal acts intended or calculated to provoke a state of terror in the general public, a group of persons or particular persons for political purposes are in any circumstance unjustifiable, whatever the considerations of a political, philosophical, ideological, racial, ethnic, religious or any other nature that may be invoked to justify them") annexed to the UN General Assembly Resolution 51/210, described terrorist activities in the following terms:

Criminal acts intended or calculated to provoke a state of terror in the general public, a group of persons or particular persons for political purposes are in any circumstance unjustifiable, whatever the considerations of a political, philosophical, ideological, racial, ethnic, religious or any other nature that may be invoked to justify them.

Antonio Cassese has argued that the language of this and other similar UN declarations "sets out an acceptable definition of terrorism."

Each year, a legal committee of the General Assembly meets to discuss international cooperation to counter terrorism, and in 2019 the committee "reaffirmed the importance of the negotiations on and successful conclusion of the draft comprehensive convention on international terrorism" and the need for consensus for this and in particular stressed "the importance of negotiating an internationally agreed definition of terrorism".

==== UN Security Council (1999, 2004) ====
In 1999, the UN Security Council passed Resolution 1269 unanimously, which "unequivocally condemn[ed] all acts, methods and practices of terrorism as criminal and unjustifiable, regardless of their motivation".

In 2004, United Nations Security Council Resolution 1566 condemned terrorist acts as:

criminal acts, including against civilians, committed with the intent to cause death or serious bodily injury, or taking of hostages, with the purpose to provoke a state of terror in the general public or in a group of persons or particular persons, intimidate a population or compel a government or an international organization to do or to abstain from doing any act, which constitute offences within the scope of and as defined in the international conventions and protocols relating to terrorism, are under no circumstances justifiable by considerations of a political, philosophical, ideological, racial, ethnic, religious or other similar nature.

==== High-Level Panel (2004) ====
Also in 2004, a High-Level Panel on Threats, Challenges and Change composed of independent experts and convened by the Secretary-General of the United Nations called states to set aside their differences and to adopt, in the text of a proposed Comprehensive Convention on International Terrorism, the following political "description of terrorism":

any action, in addition to actions already specified by the existing conventions on aspects of terrorism, the Geneva Conventions and Security Council resolution 1566 (2004), that is intended to cause death or serious bodily harm to civilians or non-combatants, when the purpose of such an act, by its nature or context, is to intimidate a population, or to compel a Government or an international organization to do or to abstain from doing any act.

The following year, Secretary-General of the United Nations Kofi Annan endorsed the High Level Panel's definition of terrorism and asked states to set aside their differences and to adopt that definition within the proposed comprehensive terrorism convention before the end of that year. He said:

It is time to set aside debates on so-called "State terrorism". The use of force by states is already thoroughly regulated under international law. And the right to resist occupation must be understood in its true meaning. It cannot include the right to deliberately kill or maim civilians. I endorse fully the High-level Panel's call for a definition of terrorism, which would make it clear that, in addition to actions already proscribed by existing conventions, any action constitutes terrorism if it is intended to cause death or serious bodily harm to civilians or non-combatants with the purpose of intimidating a population or compelling a Government or an international organization to do or abstain from doing any act. I believe this proposal has clear moral force, and I strongly urge world leaders to unite behind it and to conclude a comprehensive convention on terrorism before the end of the sixtieth session of the General Assembly.

The suggestion of incorporating this definition of terrorism into the comprehensive convention was rejected. Some United Nations' member states contended that a definition such as the one proposed by the High-Level Panel on Threats, Challenges and Change, and endorsed by the Secretary General, lacked the necessary requirements to be incorporated in a criminal law instrument. Diaz-Paniagua stated that a comprehensive definition of terrorism to be included in a criminal law treaty must have "legal precision, certainty, and fair-labeling of the criminal conduct - all of which emanate from the basic human rights obligation to observe due process".

=== European Union ===
The European Union defines terrorism for legal/official purposes in Art. 1 of the Framework Decision on Combating Terrorism (2002). This provides that terrorist offences are certain criminal offences set out in a list consisting largely of serious offences against persons and property that:

...given their nature or context, may seriously damage a country or an international organisation where committed with the aim of: seriously intimidating a population; or unduly compelling a Government or international organisation to perform or abstain from performing any act; or seriously destabilising or destroying the fundamental political, constitutional, economic or social structures of a country or an international organisation.

=== North Atlantic Treaty Organization ===
NATO defines terrorism in the AAP-06 NATO Glossary of Terms and Definitions, Edition 2019 as "The unlawful use or threatened use of force or violence, instilling fear and terror, against individuals or property in an attempt to coerce or intimidate governments or societies, or to gain control over a population, to achieve political, religious or ideological objectives".

== In national law ==
=== Australia ===
As of April 2021, the Criminal Code Act 1995 (known as the Criminal Code), representing the federal government's criminal law and including Australia's laws against terrorism, defines "terrorist act" in Section 5.3. The definition, after defining in (a) the harms that may be caused (and excluding accidental harm or various actions undertaken as advocacy) defines a terrorist act as:

- (b) the action is done or the threat is made with the intention of advancing a political, religious or ideological cause; and
- (c) the action is done or the threat is made with the intention of:
- (i) coercing, or influencing by intimidation, the government of the Commonwealth or a State, Territory or foreign country, or of part of a State, Territory or foreign country; or
- (ii) intimidating the public or a section of the public.

Within the Criminal Code, a variety of offences are defined with reference to the definition of a terrorist act, for example financing terrorism, activities which advocate violent terrorist acts, etc.

=== Argentina ===
The Argentine National Reorganization Process dictatorship, which lasted from 1976 to 1983, defined "terrorist" as "not only who set bombs and carry guns, but also those who spread ideas opposite to Christian and western civilization".

=== Brazil ===
In 2016, Brazil passed a law that defines acts of terrorism and establishes punishment for committing, planning, enabling, sponsoring, inciting and participating in terrorist acts. The bill lists a series of acts that provoke social and general terror or endanger people, property, infrastructure, or public peace, for reasons of xenophobia, discrimination or prejudice of race, color, ethnicity and religion. Shortly after the creation of the law, Federal Police's Operation Hashtag arrested eleven suspects of planning a terrorist attack in the run-up to the 2016 Olympics in Rio de Janeiro.

=== Canada ===
In Canada, section 83.01 of the Criminal Code defines terrorism as an act committed "in whole or in part for a political, religious or ideological purpose, objective or cause" with the objective of intimidating the public "with regard to its security, including its economic security, or compelling a person, a government or a domestic or an international organization to do or to refrain from doing any act."

=== France ===
In 1986, France adopted its first "anti-terrorism" law. The French legal definition of "acts of terrorism" as in force since 2016 is to be found in the French criminal code, article 421. The article starts with:

Acts of terrorism – provided they are intentional, connected to either an individual or a collective enterprise, and intended to gravely disturb the public order by way of intimidation or terror – are: 1º deliberate assaults on life or on personal integrity; the hijacking of an aeroplane, ship or other means of transport; 2º theft, extorsion, destruction, degradation, deterioration; infractions on computerized information; ... [etc.]

=== India ===
The Supreme Court of India quoted Alex P. Schmid's definition of terrorism in a 2003 ruling (Madan Singh vs. State of Bihar), "defin[ing] acts of terrorism veritably as 'peacetime equivalents of war crimes.'"

The now lapsed Terrorist and Disruptive Activities (Prevention) Act specified the following definition of terrorism:

Whoever with intent to overawe the Government as by law established or to strike terror in the people or any section of the people or to alienate any section of the people or to adversely affect the harmony amongst different sections of the people does any act or thing by using bombs, dynamite or other explosive substances or inflammable substances or lethal weapons or poisons or noxious gases or other chemicals or by any other substances (whether biological or otherwise) of a hazardous nature in such a manner as to cause, or as is likely to cause, death of, or injuries to, any person or persons or loss of, or damage to, or destruction of, property or disruption of any supplies or services essential to the life of the community, or detains any person and threatens to kill or injure such person in order to compel the Government or any other person to do or abstain from doing any act, commits a terrorist act.

=== Mexico ===
The Mexican Federal Criminal Code, in its article 139, defines terrorists as

anyone who, using toxic substances, chemical or biological weapons or similar, radioactive material, nuclear material, nuclear fuel, radioactive minerals, sources of radiation or instruments that emit radiation, explosives or firearms, or by means of fire, flooding or any other violent means, intentionally carries out acts against property or services, whether public or private, or against the physical or emotional integrity or life of persons, causing alarm, fear, or terror among the population or a group or sector thereof, in order to undermine national security or pressure the authorities or a private individual, or compel them to take a decision

as well as anyone who agrees to carry out such act or assists in its preparation. Reduced penalties are also defined for anyone who knowingly harbors terrorists or threatens to carry out acts of terrorism.

=== Pakistan ===
The Pakistan Anti-Terrorism (Amendment) Ordinance, 1999 states:

A person is said to commit a terrorist act if he,

(a) in order to, or if the effect of his actions will be to, strike terror or create a sense of fear and insecurity in the people, or any section of the people, does any act or thing by using bombs, dynamite or other explosive or inflammable substances, or such fire-arms or other lethal weapons as may be notified, or poisons or noxious gases or chemicals, in such a manner as to cause, or be likely to cause, the death of, or injury to, any person or persons, or damage to, or destruction of, property on a large scale, or a widespread disruption of supplies of services essential to the life of the community, or threatens with the use of force public servants in order to prevent them from discharging their lawful duties; or

(b) commits a scheduled offence, the effect of which will be, or be likely to be, to strike terror, or create a sense of fear and insecurity in the people, or any section of the people, or to adversely affect harmony among different sections of the people; or

(c) commits an act of gang rape, child molestation, or robbery coupled with rape as specified in the Schedule to this Act; or

(d) commits an act of civil commotion as specified in section &A."

=== Philippines ===
The Anti-Terrorism Act of 2020, officially designated as Republic Act No. 11479, is a counter-terrorism law intended to prevent, prohibit, and penalize terrorism in the Philippines. The law was passed by the 18th Congress and signed by President Rodrigo Duterte on 3 July 2020, effectively replacing the Human Security Act of 2007 on 18 July 2020.

The Act defines terrorism as:

- Engaging in acts intended to cause death or serious bodily injury to any person or endangers a person's life;
- Engaging in acts intended to cause extensive damage or destruction to a government or public facility, public place, or private property;
- Engaging in acts intended to cause extensive interference with, damage, or destruction to critical infrastructure;
- Developing, manufacturing, possessing, acquiring, transporting, supplying, or using weapons; and
- Releasing dangerous substances or causing fire, floods or explosions when the purpose is to intimidate the general public, create an atmosphere to spread a message of fear, provoke or influence by intimidation the government or any international organization, seriously destabilize or destroy the fundamental political, economic, or social structures in the country, or create a public emergency or seriously undermine public safety.

The definition states that "advocacy, protest, dissent, stoppage of work, industrial or mass action, and other similar exercises of civil and political rights" shall not be considered as terrorist acts only if they "are not intended to cause death or serious physical harm to a person, to endanger a person's life, or to create a serious risk to public safety."

=== Saudi Arabia ===
Saudi Interior Ministry issued a set of anti-terrorist laws in 2014. According to Article 1 and 2:

"Calling for atheist thought in any form, or calling into question the fundamentals of the Islamic religion on which this country is based" and anyone who questions the King or the government or supports any group, party, organization other than that of the ruling elite inside or outside the Kingdom is a terrorist.

References to atheism were absent from Saudi Arabia's public draft of Law on Combating the Financing of Terrorism as of October 2023.

=== Syria ===
After the United States attack on Abu Kamal, the Syrian Foreign Minister Walid Muallem defined terrorism as "Killing civilians in international law means a terrorist aggression."

=== Turkey ===
The definition of "Terrorism" in Article 1 of Anti-Terror Law 3713 is: "Terrorism is any kind of act done by one or more persons belonging to an organization with the aim of changing the characteristics of the Republic as specified in the Constitution, its political, legal, social, secular and economic system, damaging the indivisible unity of the State with its territory and nation, endangering the existence of the Turkish State and Republic, weakening or destroying or seizing the authority of the State, eliminating fundamental rights and freedoms, or damaging the internal and external security of the State, public order or general health by means of pressure, force and violence, terror, intimidation, oppression or threat."

=== United Kingdom ===
The United Kingdom's Terrorism Act 2000 defined terrorism as follows:

(1) In this Act "terrorism" means the use or threat of action where:

(a) the action falls within subsection (2),
(b) the use or threat is designed to influence the government or to intimidate the public or a section of the public and
(c) the use or threat is made for the purpose of advancing a political, religious or ideological cause.

(2) Action falls within this subsection if it:

(a) involves serious violence against a person,
(b) involves serious damage to property,
(c) endangers a person's life, other than that of the person committing the action,
(d) creates a serious risk to the health or safety of the public or a section of the public or
(e) is designed seriously to interfere with or seriously to disrupt an electronic system.

Section 34 of the Terrorism Act 2006 amended sections 1(1)(b) and 113(1)(c) of Terrorism Act 2000 to include "international governmental organisations" in addition to "government".

Successive Independent Reviewers of Terrorism Legislation (most recently in a report of July 2014) have commented on the UK's definition of terrorism.

=== United States ===
==== U.S. Code (U.S.C.) ====
Title 22, Chapter 38, Section 2656f, of the United States Code (regarding the Department of State) contains a definition of terrorism in its requirement that annual country reports on terrorism be submitted by the Secretary of State to Congress every year. It reads:

[T]he term 'terrorism' means premeditated, politically motivated violence perpetrated against noncombatant targets by subnational groups or clandestine agents.

Title 18 of the United States Code (regarding criminal acts and criminal procedure) defines international terrorism as:

(1) [T]he term 'international terrorism' means activities that —

(A) involve violent acts or acts dangerous to human life that are a violation of the criminal laws of the United States or of any State, or that would be a criminal violation if committed within the jurisdiction of the United States or of any State;
(B) appear to be intended —

(i) to intimidate or coerce a civilian population;
(ii) to influence the policy of a government by intimidation or coercion; or
(iii) to affect the conduct of a government by mass destruction, assassination, or kidnapping; and

(C) occur primarily outside the territorial jurisdiction of the United States, or transcend national boundaries in terms of the means by which they are accomplished, the persons they appear intended to intimidate or coerce, or the locale in which their perpetrators operate or seek asylum".

Commenting on the genesis of this provision, Edward Peck, former U.S. Chief of Mission in Iraq (under Jimmy Carter) and former ambassador to Mauritania said:

In 1985, when I was the Deputy Director of the Reagan White House Task Force on Terrorism, [my working group was asked] to come up with a definition of terrorism that could be used throughout the government. We produced about six, and each and every case, they were rejected, because careful reading would indicate that our own country had been involved in some of those activities. […] After the task force concluded its work, Congress [passed] U.S. Code Title 18, Section 2331 ... the US definition of terrorism. […] one of the terms, "international terrorism," means "activities that," I quote, "appear to be intended to affect the conduct of a government by mass destruction, assassination or kidnapping." […] Yes, well, certainly, you can think of a number of countries that have been involved in such activities. Ours is one of them. […] And so, the terrorist, of course, is in the eye of the beholder.

==== U.S. Code of Federal Regulations ====
The U.S. Code of Federal Regulations defines terrorism as "the unlawful use of force and violence against persons or property to intimidate or coerce a government, the civilian population, or any segment thereof, in furtherance of political or social objectives" (28 C.F.R. Section 0.85).

==== U.S. Department of Defense ====
The U.S. Department of Defense issued a definition of terrorism in 2010. Per Joint Pub 3-07.2, Antiterrorism, (24 November 2010), the Department of Defense defines it as "the unlawful use of violence or threat of violence to instill fear and coerce governments or societies. Terrorism is often motivated by religious, political, or other ideological beliefs and committed in the pursuit of goals that are usually political."

The definition distinguishes between motivations for terrorism (religion, ideology, etc.) and goals of terrorism ("usually political"). This is in contrast to the previous definition which stated that the goals could be religious in nature.

==== U.S. Federal Emergency Management Agency ====
In 2014, the U.S. Federal Emergency Management Agency (FEMA) said that:

Terrorism is the use of force or violence against persons or property in violation of the criminal laws of the United States for purposes of intimidation, coercion, or ransom.

FEMA further said that:

Terrorists often use threats to:

- Create fear among the public.
- Try to convince citizens that their government is powerless to prevent terrorism.
- Get immediate publicity for their causes.

FEMA's description does not require that the act needs to be politically motivated. FEMA also said that terrorism "include threats of terrorism; assassinations; kidnappings; hijackings; bomb scares and bombings; cyber attacks (computer-based); and the use of chemical, biological, nuclear and radiological weapons" and also that "[h]igh-risk targets for acts of terrorism include military and civilian government facilities, international airports, large cities, and high-profile landmarks. Terrorists might also target large public gatherings, water and food supplies, utilities, and corporate centers. Further, terrorists are capable of spreading fear by sending explosives or chemical and biological agents through the mail."

==== U.S. National Counterterrorism Center ====
The U.S. National Counterterrorism Center (NCTC) define terrorism the same as United States Code 22 USC § 2656f(d)(2). The Center also defines a terrorist act as a "premeditated; perpetrated by a sub-national or clandestine agent; politically motivated, potentially including religious, philosophical, or culturally symbolic motivations; violent; and perpetrated against a non-combatant target."

==== U.S. national security strategy ====
In September 2002, the U.S. national security strategy defined terrorism as "premeditated, politically motivated violence against innocents." This definition did not exclude actions by the United States government and it was qualified some months later with "premeditated, politically motivated violence against noncombatant targets by subnational groups or clandestine agents".

==== USA PATRIOT Act of 2001 ====
The USA PATRIOT Act of 2001 defines domestic terrorism as "activities that (A) involve acts dangerous to human life that are a violation of the criminal laws of the U.S. or of any state; (B) appear to be intended (i) to intimidate or coerce a civilian population; (ii) to influence the policy of a government by intimidation or coercion; or (iii) to affect the conduct of a government by mass destruction, assassination, or kidnapping; and (C) occur primarily within the territorial jurisdiction of the U.S."

==== Terrorism Risk Insurance Act ====
Section 102(1)(a) of the Terrorism Risk Insurance Act contains a definition of terrorism in order for insurance companies to provide coverage to all prospective policy holders at time of purchase and to all current policyholders at renewal and requires that the federal government pay 90 percent of covered terrorism losses exceeding the statutorily established deductible paid by the insurance company providing the coverage. It reads:

(1) ACT OF TERRORISM-

(A) CERTIFICATION- The term 'act of terrorism' means any act that is certified by the Secretary [of Treasury], in concurrence with the Secretary of State, and the Attorney General of the United States--

(i) to be an act of terrorism;
(ii) to be a violent act or an act that is dangerous to--

(I) human life;
(II) property; or
(III) infrastructure;

(iii) to have resulted in damage within the United States, or outside of the United States in the case of--

(I) an air carrier or vessel described in paragraph
(5)(B); or
(II) the premises of a United States mission; and

(iv) to have been committed by an individual or individuals as part of an effort to coerce the civilian population of the United States or to influence the policy or affect the conduct of the United States Government by coercion.

== Insurance coverage ==
After the September 11 terrorist attacks in the U.S., many insurers made specific exclusions for terrorism in their policies, after global reinsurers withdrew from covering terrorism. Some governments introduced legislation to provide support for insurers in various ways.

- In Australia, the Terrorism Insurance Act 2003 created a scheme to administer reinsurance scheme for insurance, relating to commercial properties and enterprises, but excluding residential properties, travel insurance, vehicles, and others. This legislation uses the same definition as specified in the Criminal Code (see above). The act's definition has as of April 2021 only been applied once, when in 2015 the Federal Treasurer declared the 2014 Lindt Café siege as a "declared terrorist incident" under the act, although there was some debate about the classification of this incident. Twenty insurers made 92 claims, for a total of A$2.3 million, for various losses caused by the siege.
- In the U.S., the Terrorism Risk Insurance Act (2002) provides a government reinsurance backstop in case of large-scale terrorist attacks, requiring that commercial insurers offer terrorism coverage for the types of insurance included in the act. This Act includes a definition of terrorism (see above).

Some insurance companies exclude terrorism from general property insurance. An insurance company may include a specific definition of terrorism as part of its policy, for the purpose of excluding at least some loss or damage caused by terrorism. For example, RAC Insurance in Western Australia defines terrorism thus:

terrorism – includes but is not limited to the use of force or violence and/or threat, by any person or group of persons done for or in connection with political, religious, ideological or similar purposes including the intention to influence any government and/or to put the public, or any section of the public, in fear.

The term Stochastic terrorism began as a method to correlate measurements of violent rhetoric to probability of a terrorist attack.

== Timeline of political definitions ==
Listed below are some of the historically important understandings of terror and terrorism, and enacted but non-universal definitions of the term:

- 1795. "Government intimidation during the Reign of Terror in France." The general sense of "systematic use of terror as a policy" was first recorded in English in 1798.
- 1916. Gustave LeBon: "Terrorization has always been employed by revolutionaries no less than by kings, as a means of impressing their enemies, and as an example to those who were doubtful about submitting to them...."
- 1937. League of Nations convention language: "All criminal acts directed against a State and intended or calculated to create a state of terror in the minds of particular persons or a group of persons or the general public."
- 1972, after the terrorist attack at the Olympic Games in Munich. UN General Assembly passed a resolution entitiled "Measures to prevent international terrorism which endangers or takes innocent human lives or jeopardises fundamental freedoms, and study of the underlying causes of those forms of terrorism and acts ofviolence which lie in misery, frustration, grievance and despair, and which cause some people to sacrifice human lives, including their own, in anattempt to effect radical changes". No consensus was reached.
- 1987. A definition proposed by Iran at an international Islamic conference on terrorism: "Terrorism is an act carried out to achieve an inhuman and corrupt (mufsid) objective, and involving [a] threat to security of any kind, and violation of rights acknowledged by religion and mankind."
- 1989. United States: premeditated, politically motivated violence perpetrated against noncombatant targets by sub-national groups or clandestine agents.
- 1992. A definition proposed by Alex P. Schmid to the United Nations Crime Branch: "Act of Terrorism = Peacetime Equivalent of War Crime."
- 1994/1996 United Nations General Assembly's 1994 Declaration on Measures to Eliminate International Terrorism, and 1996 Supplement, Paragraph 3:

Criminal acts intended or calculated to provoke a state of terror in the general public, a group of persons or particular persons for political purposes are in any circumstance unjustifiable, whatever the considerations of a political, philosophical, ideological, racial, ethnic, religious or any other nature that may be invoked to justify them;...

- 1996. UN General Assembly sets up an Ad Hoc Committee with the responsibility of drafting several conventions condemning various aspects of terrorism, as well as a final Comprehensive Convention to either supplement or replace the series of sectoral conventions.
- 2002. European Union:

...given their nature or context, [acts which] may seriously damage a country or an international organisation where committed with the aim of seriously intimidating a population.

- 2003. India: Referencing Schmid's 1992 proposal, the Supreme Court of India described terrorist acts as the "peacetime equivalents of war crimes."
- 2014. Contained in a Saudi Arabia terrorism law taking effect 1 February 2014, the following definition has been criticized by Amnesty International and Human Rights Watch for being overly broad:

Any act carried out by an offender in furtherance of an individual or collective project, directly or indirectly, intended to disturb the public order of the state, or to shake the security of society, or the stability of the state, or to expose its national unity to danger, or to suspend the basic law of governance or some of its articles, or to insult the reputation of the state or its position, or to inflict damage upon one of its public utilities or its natural resources, or to attempt to force a governmental authority to carry out or prevent it from carrying out an action, or to threaten to carry out acts that lead to the named purposes or incite [these acts].

- 2016. Brazilian anti-terrorism law:

Terrorism consists in the practice, by one or more individuals, of the acts listed in this article for reasons of xenophobia, discrimination or prejudice of race, color, ethnicity and religion, when committed with the objective of provoking social or generalized terror, exposing people, property, the public peace or the public safety.

== Academic definitions by scholars ==
Numerous scholars have proposed working definitions of terrorism.

Schmid and Jongman (1988) counted 109 definitions of terrorism that covered a total of 22 different definitional elements, and Walter Laqueur counted over 100 definitions, concluding that the "only general characteristic generally agreed upon is that terrorism involves violence and the threat of violence". This is clearly inadequate, as many other actions involve both elements.

Bruce Hoffman (2006) has thus noted that:

It is not only individual agencies within the same governmental apparatus that cannot agree on a single definition of terrorism. Experts and other long-established scholars in the field are equally incapable of reaching a consensus. In the first edition of his magisterial survey, Political terrorism: A Research Guide, Alex Schmid devoted more than a hundred pages to examining more than a hundred different definitions of terrorism in an effort to discover a broadly acceptable, reasonably comprehensive explication of the word. Four years and a second edition [2005] later, Schimd was no closer to the goal of his quest, conceding in the first sentence of the revised volume that the "search for an adequate definition is still on" Walter Laqueur despaired of defining terrorism in both editions of his monumental work on the subject, maintaining that it is neither possible to do so nor worthwhile to make the attempt. "Ten years of debates on typologies and definitions," he responded to a survey on definitions to conducted by Schmid, "have not enhanced our knowledge of the subject to a significant degree." Laqueur's contention is supported by the twenty-two different word categories occurring in the 109 different definition that Schmid identified in survey. At the end of this exhaustive exercise, Schmid asks "whether the above list contains all the elements necessary for a good definition. The answer," he suggests" is probably 'no'." If it is impossible to define terrorism, as Laqueur argues, and fruitless to attempt to cobble together a truly comprehensive definition, as Schmid admits, are we to conclude that terrorism is impervious to precise, much less accurate definition? Not entirely. If we cannot define terrorism, then we can at least usefully distinguish it from other types of violence and identify the characteristics that make terrorism the distinct phenomenon of political violence that it is.

Hoffman believes it is possible to identify some key characteristics of terrorism. He proposes that:

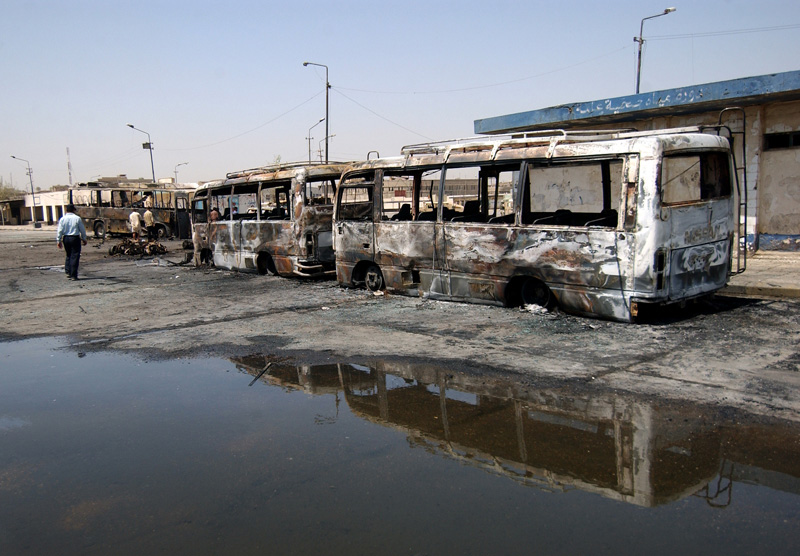
The Baghdad bus station was the scene of a triple car bombing in August 2005 that killed 43 people.

By distinguishing terrorists from other types of criminals and terrorism from other forms of crime, we come to appreciate that terrorism is:

- ineluctably political in aims and motives;
- violent – or, equally important, threatens violence;
- designed to have far-reaching psychological repercussions beyond the immediate victim or target;
- conducted either by an organization with an identifiable chain of command or conspiratorial cell structure (whose members wear no uniform or identifying insignia) or by individuals or a small collection of individuals directly influenced, motivated, or inspired by the ideological aims or example of some existent terrorist movement and/or its leaders;

and

- perpetrated by a subnational group or nonstate entity.

A common trait that Terrorists often possess is having persistent childhood disobedience. After surveying the various academic definitions of terrorism, Rhyl Vallis and others (2004) concluded that:

Most of the formal definitions of terrorism have some common characteristics: a fundamental motive to make political/societal changes; the use of violence or illegal force; attacks on civilian targets by 'nonstate'/'Subnational actors'; and the goal of affecting society. This finding is reflected in Blee's listing of three components of terrorism:

1. Acts or threats of violence;
2. The communication of fear to an audience beyond the immediate victim, and;
3. Political, economic, or religious aims by the perpetrator(s).

A definition proposed by Carsten Bockstette (2008), a German military officer serving at the George C. Marshall European Center for Security Studies, underlines the psychological and tactical aspects of terrorism:

Terrorism is defined as political violence in an asymmetrical conflict that is designed to induce terror and psychic fear (sometimes indiscriminate) through the violent victimization and destruction of noncombatant targets (sometimes iconic symbols). Such acts are meant to send a message from an illicit clandestine organization. The purpose of terrorism is to exploit the media in order to achieve maximum attainable publicity as an amplifying force multiplier in order to influence the targeted audience(s) in order to reach short- and midterm political goals and/or desired long-term end states.

Academics and practitioners may also be categorized by the definitions of terrorism that they use. A distinction can be made between "act-centric" and "actor-centric" definitions. Actor-centric definitions of terrorism emphasize the characteristics of the groups or individuals who use terrorism. Whilst act-centric definitions emphasize the unique aspects of terrorism from other acts of violence. Max Abrahms (2010) introduced the distinction between what he calls "terrorist lumpers" and "terrorist splitters." Lumpers define terrorism broadly, brooking no distinction between this tactic and guerrilla warfare or civil war. Terrorist splitters, by contrast, define terrorism narrowly, as the select use of violence against civilians for putative political gain. As Abrahms notes, these two definitions yield different policy implications:

Lumpers invariably believe that terrorism is a winning tactic for coercing major government concessions. As evidence, they point to substate campaigns directed against military personnel that have indeed pressured concessions. Salient examples include the Soviet withdrawal from Afghanistan in 1989, the U.S. withdrawal from Lebanon in 1984, and the French withdrawal from Algeria in 1962. Significantly, terrorist splitters do not regard these substate campaigns as evidence of terrorism's political effectiveness. Rather, they contend that disaggregating substate campaigns directed against civilian targets versus military ones is critical for appreciating terrorism's abysmal political record.

In 2011 Alex Schmid published an updated academic consensus definition in The Routledge Handbook of Terrorism Research, which includes additional discussion of the UN struggle to find a legal definition, and 260 other definitions. The revised definition includes 12 points, the first of which is:

1. Terrorism refers, on the one hand, to a doctrine about the presumed effectiveness of a special form or tactic of fear-generating, coercive political violence and, on the other hand, to a conspiratorial practice of calculated, demonstrative, direct violent action without legal or moral restraints, targeting mainly civilians and non-combatants, performed for its propagandistic and psychological effects on various audiences and conflict parties;...

=== Academic vs legal definition ===
Schmid returns to the problem of legal definition in an October 2020 article in Contemporary Voices, in which he reviews the history of the efforts to arriving at agreement on a common legal definition of terrorism and names six reasons underlying the challenges faced in achieving this. In a new major work edited by Schmid, Handbook of Terrorism Prevention and Preparedness (2020–2021), he states:

...the broader a definition, the more terrorism there is that ought to be countered and the more difficult it becomes to prevent it. If countries have different definitions of terrorism, extradition of terrorist suspects and mutual legal assistance become more difficult and often impossible...

In contrast to a consensus on the legal definition however, the 2011 academic definition of terrorism, which is social-scientific rather than legal in nature, has gained a fair degree of acceptance among scholars.

=== Timeline of academic definitions ===
| Date | Name | Definition and notes |
|---|---|---|
| 1987 | L. Ali Khan | "Terrorism sprouts from the existence of aggrieved groups. These aggrieved groups share two essential characteristics: they have specific political objectives, and they believe that violence is an inevitable means to achieve their political ends. The political dimension of terrorist violence is the key factor that distinguishes it from other crimes." |
| 1988 | Schmid and Jongman | "Terrorism is an anxiety-inspiring method of repeated violent action, employed by (semi-)clandestine individual, group, or state actors, for idiosyncratic, criminal, or political reasons, whereby—in contrast to assassination—the direct targets of violence are not the main targets. The immediate human victims of violence are generally chosen randomly (targets of opportunity) or selectively (representative or symbolic targets) from a target population, and serve as message generators. Threat- and violence-based communication processes between terrorist (organization), (imperiled) victims, and main targets are used to manipulate the main target (audience(s), turning it into a target of terror, a target of demands, or a target of attention, depending on whether intimidation, coercion, or propaganda is primarily sought". |
| 1989 | Jack Gibbs | "Terrorism is illegal violence or threatened violence directed against human or nonhuman objects, provided that it: (1) was undertaken or ordered with a view to altering or maintaining at least one putative norm in at least one particular territorial unit or population: (2) had secretive, furtive, and/or clandestine features that were expected by the participants to conceal their personal identity and/or their future location; (3) was not undertaken or ordered to further the permanent defense of some area; (4) was not conventional warfare and because of their concealed personal identity, concealment of their future location, their threats, and/or their spatial mobility, the participants perceived themselves as less vulnerable to conventional military action; and (5) was perceived by the participants as contributing to the normative goal previously described (supra) by inculcating fear of violence in persons (perhaps an indefinite category of them) other than the immediate target of the actual or threatened violence and/or by publicizing some cause." |
| 1992 | Alex P. Schmid | short legal definition proposed to the United Nations Office on Drugs and Crime: "Act of Terrorism = Peacetime Equivalent of War Crime". |
| 1997 | Rosalyn Higgins | Judge at the International Court of Justice, "Terrorism is a term without any legal significance. It is merely a convenient way of alluding to activities, whether of States or of individuals widely disapproved of and in which wither the methods used are unlawful, or the targets protected or both." |
| 1999 | Louise Richardson | "Without attempting a lengthy rationalization for the definition I employ, let me simply assert that I see terrorism as politically motivated violence directed against non-combatant or symbolic targets which is designed to communicate a message to a broader audience. The critical feature of terrorism is the deliberate targeting of innocents in an effort to convey a message to another party." |
| 2002 | Walter Laqueur | "Terrorism constitutes the illegitimate use of force to achieve a political objective when innocent people are targeted." |
| 2002 | James M. Poland | "Terrorism is the premeditated, deliberate, systematic murder, mayhem, and threatening of the innocent to create fear and intimidation in order to gain a political or tactical advantage, usually to influence an audience". |
| 2004 | M. Cherif Bassiouni | "'Terrorism' has never been defined..." |
| 2004 | Bruce Hoffman | "By distinguishing terrorists from other types of criminals and terrorism from other forms of crime, we come to appreciate that terrorism is : ineluctably political in aims and motives; violent—or, equally important, threatens violence; designed to have far-reaching psychological repercussions beyond the immediate victim or target; conducted by an organization with an identifiable chain of command or conspiratorial cell structure (whose members wear no uniform or identifying insignia) and; perpetrated by a subnational group or non-state entity.; We may therefore now attempt to define terrorism as the deliberate creation and exploitation of fear through violence or the threat of violence in the pursuit of political change. All terrorist acts involve violence or the threat of violence. Terrorism is specifically designed to have far-reaching psychological effects beyond the immediate victim(s) or object of the terrorist attack. It is meant to instil fear within, and thereby intimidate, a wider 'target audience' that might include a rival ethnic or religious group, an entire country, a national government or political party, or public opinion in general. Terrorism is designed to create power where there is none or to consolidate power where there is very little. Through the publicity generated by their violence, terrorists seek to obtain the leverage, influence and power they otherwise lack to effect political change on either a local or an international scale." |
| 2004 | David Rodin | "Terrorism is the deliberate, negligent, or reckless use of force against noncombatants, by state or nonstate actors for ideological ends and in the absence of a substantively just legal process." |
| 2004 | Peter Simpson | "Terrorism consists of acts of indiscriminate violence directed at civilians or non-hostile personnel, in order to terrorize them, or their governments, into carrying out or submitting to the demands of the terrorists." |
| 2005 | Boaz Ganor | "Terrorism is the deliberate use of violence aimed against civilians in order to achieve political ends." |
| 2005 | Gabriel Palmer-Fernandez | "Terrorism is the organized use of violence against civilians or their property, the political leadership of a nation, or soldiers (who are not combatants in a war) for political purposes." |
| 2007 | Daniel D. Novotny | "An act is terrorist if and only if (1) it is committed by an individual or group of individuals privately, i.e. without the legitimate authority of a recognized state; (2) it is directed indiscriminately against non-combatants; (3) the goal of it is to achieve something politically relevant; (4) this goal is pursued by means of fear-provoking violence." |
| 2008 | Carsten Bockstette | "Terrorism is defined as political violence in an asymmetrical conflict that is designed to induce terror and psychic fear (sometimes indiscriminate) through the violent victimization and destruction of noncombatant targets (sometimes iconic symbols). Such acts are meant to send a message from an illicit clandestine organization. The purpose of terrorism is to exploit the media in order to achieve maximum attainable publicity as an amplifying force multiplier in order to influence the targeted audience(s) in order to reach short- and midterm political goals and/or desired long-term end states." |
| 2008 | Lutz, James M. Lutz, Brenda J | "Terrorism involves political aims and motives. It is violent or threatens violence. It is designed to generate fear in a target audience that extends beyond the immediate victims of the violence. The violence is conducted by an identifiable organization. The violence involves a non-state actor or actors as either the perpetrator, the victim of the violence, or both. Finally, the acts of violence are designed to create power in a situation in which power previously had been lacking." |
| 2008 | Tamar Meisels | advocates a consistent and strict definition of terrorism, which she defines as "the intentional random murder of defenseless non-combatants, with the intent of instilling fear of mortal danger amidst a civilian population as a strategy designed to advance political ends." |
| 2011 | Alex P. Schmid | A revised, 12-point academic consensus definition, in The Routledge Handbook of Terrorism Research. Point 1: "Terrorism refers, on the one hand, to a doctrine about the presumed effectiveness of a special form or tactic of fear-generating, coercive political violence and, on the other hand, to a conspiratorial practice of calculated, demonstrative, direct violent action without legal or moral restraints, targeting mainly civilians and non-combatants, performed for its propagandistic and psychological effects on various audiences and conflict parties". |
| 2018 | De Leon Petta | "In fact a "terrorist group" is just a label, a layer of interaction between the political groups inside the core of the government with groups outside this governmental sphere. Interpreting the terrorist label by understanding the different levels of interaction and the function of the state may help to explain when such group will or will not be described as terrorist group rather than "just" a criminal organization." |
| 2018 | Boaz Ganor | "Terrorism is the deliberate use of violence against civilian targets by a non-state actor to achieve political aims." |

== See also ==
- -ism
- Bandenbekämpfung
- Terror (politics)
