= Perspectives on Terrorism =

- Discipline: Political violence, terrorism, counter-terrorism
- Language: English
- Edited by: James J. F. Forest

Publication details
- History: 2007–present
- Publisher: International Centre for Counter-Terrorism (EU)
- Frequency: Quarterly
- Open access: Yes
- License: Authors retain copyright

Standard abbreviations
- ISO 4: Perspect. Terror.

Indexing
- ISSN: 2334-3745
- LCCN: 2014200073
- JSTOR: 23343745
- OCLC no.: 1061231390

Links
- Journal homepage; Online access

Perspectives on Terrorism (PT) is a quarterly peer-reviewed, open-access online academic journal, covering political violence, terrorism and counter-terrorism, It is published jointly by the International Centre for Counter-Terrorism, in collaboration with Leiden University and the Handa Centre for the Study of Terrorism and Political Violence at the University of St Andrews.

== History ==
Perspectives on Terrorism was first published by the Terrorism Research Initiative (TRI) in 2007, the same year of that the organisation was founded, by Robert Wesley, Alex P. Schmid and James J.F. Forest in 2007. The Center for Terrorism and Security Studies (CTSS) was established in 2012 at University of Massachusetts Lowell (UMass Lowell), with Forest as director, and CTSS became co-publisher of the journal.

In August 2016, the journal was co-published by TRI and CTSS; in February 2017 by TRI alone; and from April 2017 (Volume XI, Issue 2) onwards, by TRI and ISGA. At this time, the journal was published under Creative Commons License 3.0, up to and including Vol 12, No 2 in April 2018, after which it moved to its new web page hosted by Leiden University.

As of March 2023, the journal was acquired by the International Centre for Counter-Terrorism, which has now taken responsibility for editing and publishing, in partnership with two academic institutions: the Institute of Security and Global Affairs (ISGA) at Leiden University, and the Handa Centre for the Study of Terrorism and Political Violence (CSTPV) at the University of St Andrews. The Journal is still published in an open access format, under Creative Commons License 4.0.

== Description ==
The journal publishes research from a wide variety of academics in many different disciplines, including political science, sociology, economics, and statistical science. The publication includes both qualitative and quantitative research on political violence and terrorism, as well as resources for academics.

Perspectives on Terrorism advances scholarship on a broad range of issues associated with the interdisciplinary study of terrorism and counter-terrorism. The journal seeks to provide a platform for scholars, whether established or early in their careers, from a wide variety of disciplinary backgrounds and geographical regions, as well as practitioners engaged in research and analysis on countering terrorism. The journal contains research articles, research notes, and bibliographic resources, as well as special sections occasionally.

The editor-in-chief is James J.F. Forest (of UMass Lowell), and the Co-editors are Joana Cook, Alex P. Schmid (International Centre for Counter-Terrorism), Tim Wilson (Handa Centre for the Study of Terrorism and Political Violence) and Craig Klein (Institute of Security and Global Affairs), as well as an extensive editorial board composed of professors and experts in the field of counter-terrorism.

The journal is available via its website, JSTOR and DOAJ, being and is open-access and free for use. There are no fees for publication, neither editors nor authors are paid, and the author retains copyright for their work.

== Abstracting and indexing ==
The journal is abstracted and indexed in Scopus (since 2017), JSTOR, and Google Scholar, where it is ranked third in Terrorism Studies journals as of April 2021.

Its CiteScore as of April 2021 is 1.3, ranking on the 65th percentile in both Law and Political Science and International Relations categories, with clear upwards trend since its 2017 debut on Scopus.
