= United Nations General Assembly Sixth Committee =

Organisation

- Abbreviation: Legal, C6
- Legal status: Active
- Headquarters: New York, United States
- Head: Chairperson; Trishala Simantini Persaud; Guyana
- Parent organization: United Nations General Assembly
- Website: www.un.org/en/ga/sixth

The United Nations General Assembly Sixth Committee (also known as the Legal Committee or C6) is one of six main committees of the General Assembly of the United Nations. It deals primarily with legal matters and is the primary forum for the consideration of international law and other legal matters concerning the United Nations.

== Mandate ==
The United Nations General Assembly has an express mandate to promote the progressive development of public international law as laid out in the Charter of the United Nations. Specifically, Article 13 of the Charter states that the General Assembly has the authority to "initiate studies and make recommendations for the purpose of: (a) promoting international co-operation in the political field and encouraging the progressive development of international law and its codification."

Subsequent practice has interpreted this provision as a broad authorization to elaborate new treaties on the widest range of issues, to adopt them, and to recommend them to states for their subsequent signature, ratification or accession. While international law-making negotiations take place in a variety of specialized bodies of the United Nations, depending on their actual subject-matter, those negotiations related to general international law are usually held at the Sixth Committee.

== Composition and method of work ==
The Sixth Committee has universal membership, as such all United Nations member states are entitled to representation in its proceedings. Non-member states with observer status may also attend and participate in the discussions of the committee.

The Sixth Committee meets every year for six weeks in parallel with the General Assembly's annual session, with its work beginning after the general debate and finishing by mid-November. Occasionally, the committee may also be reconvened upon request of the General Assembly to address substantive questions. Before the work of the committee begins, the General Assembly assigns to it a list of agenda items to be discussed. Common agenda items include:

- The promotion of justice and international law
- Accountability and internal United Nations justice matters
- Drug control
- Crime prevention
- Combating international terrorism

The committee also hears the annual reports of its reporting bodies, as well as considers requests for observer status in the General Assembly.

The committee does not hold a general debate at the start of its session, instead discussing its agenda items one by one, following a program of work adopted at its first meeting. Following formal discussions and negotiations, any adopted proposals are submitted to the plenary of the General Assembly for final adoption. If a particular issue proves too complex for the committee, it may refer it to the International Law Commission, or it may create an ad hoc committee to discuss it.

The highlight of the Sixth Committee's work is the "International Law Week" beginning at the end of October, when top legal advisers from member states meet in New York to consider the report of the International Law Commission. Additionally, during the week, the reports of the International Court of Justice and the International Criminal Court are also presented to the plenary of the General Assembly.

== Reporting bodies ==
The following bodies all report to the General Assembly through the Sixth Committee:

- Committee on Relations with the Host Country
- International Law Commission
- Special Committee on the Charter of the United Nations and on the Strengthening of the Role of the Organization
- United Nations Commission on International Trade Law
- United Nations Programme of Assistance in the Teaching, Study, Dissemination, and Wider Appreciation of International Law
- Various ad hoc Committees established by the General Assembly in the context of the work of C6

== Current state ==
In its 81st session, the committee focused on:

F. Promotion of justice and international law

- Criminal accountability of United Nations officials and experts on mission
- Report of the United Nations Commission on International Trade Law on the work of its fifty-ninth session
- United Nations Programme of Assistance in the Teaching, Study, Dissemination and Wider Appreciation of International Law
- Report of the International Law Commission on the work of its seventy -sixth and seventy-seventh sessions
- United Nations Conference of Plenipotentiaries on Prevention and Punishment of Crimes against Humanity
- Expulsion of aliens (Note: “Alien” means an individual who does not have the nationality of the State in whose territory that individual is present.)
- Status of the Protocols Additional to the Geneva Conventions of 1949 and relating to the protection of victims of armed conflicts
- Consideration of effective measures to enhance the protection, security and safety of diplomatic and consular missions and representatives
- Report of the Special Committee on the Charter of the United Nations and on the Strengthening of the Role of the Organization
- The rule of law at the national and international levels
- The scope and application of the principle of universal jurisdiction
- The law of transboundary aquifers
- Responsibility of international organizations
- United Nations Conference of Plenipotentiaries on Protection of Persons in the Event of Disasters

H. Drug control, crime prevention and combating international terrorism in all its forms and manifestations

- Measures to eliminate international terrorism

I. Organizational, administrative and other matters

- Revitalization of the work of the General Assembly
- Programme planning
- Administration of justice at the United Nations
- Report of the Committee on Relations with the Host Country

The following organisations were also reviewed for Observer status in the General Assembly:

- Cooperation Council of Turkic-speaking States
- Eurasian Economic Union
- Ramsar Convention on Wetlands
- Global Environment Facility
- International Organization of Employers
- International Trade Union Confederation
- Boao Forum for Asia
- International Parliamentarians’ Congress
- International Centre for Integrated Mountain Development
- Islamic Organization for Food Security
- African Export-Import Bank
- Climate Vulnerable Forum
- Parliamentary Assembly of la Francophonie

== Bureau ==
The following make up the bureau of the Sixth Committee for the 81st session of the General Assembly:

Name	Country	Position
Trishala Simantini Persaud	Guyana	Chairperson
Andrii Melnyk	Ukraine	Vice-chair
Mantsho Annastacia Motsepe	South Africa	Vice-chair
Elisa Johanna S. De Raes	Belgium	Vice-chair
Abdulaziz Fadala M. A. Al-Sulaiti	Qatar	Rapporteur

== Treaties and resolutions negotiated at the Sixth Committee ==
The following treaties and resolutions have been negotiated, as a whole or in part, at the Sixth Committee:

- The 1961 Vienna Convention on Diplomatic Relations
- The 1969 Vienna Convention on the Law of Treaties
- The 1970 Declaration on Principles of International Law, Friendly Relations and Co-operation among States in accordance with the Charter of the United Nations
- The 1973 Convention on the Prevention and Punishment of Crimes against Internationally Protected Persons, including Diplomatic Agents (Protection of Diplomats Convention)
- The 1978 Vienna Convention on Succession of States in respect of Treaties
- The 1979 International Convention against the Taking of Hostages (Hostages Convention)
- The 1995 Convention on the Safety of United Nations and Associated Personnel
- The 1994 Declaration on Measures to Eliminate International Terrorism
  - Also 1996 Supplement to the Declaration, adopted by General Assembly resolution 51/210, 17 December 1996
- The 1997 International Convention for the Suppression of Terrorist Bombings (Terrorist Bombing Convention)
- The 1997 Convention on the Law of Non-Navigational Uses of International Watercourses
- The 1998 Rome Statute of the International Criminal Court
- The 1999 International Convention for the Suppression of the Financing of Terrorism (Terrorist Financing Convention)
- The 2001 Draft Articles on the Responsibility of States for Internationally Wrongful Acts
- The 2005 International Convention for the Suppression of Acts of Nuclear Terrorism (Nuclear Terrorism Convention)
- The 2006 United Nations Declaration on Human Cloning
- The 2023 High Seas Treaty

Since 2000 the Sixth Committee has been elaborating a Comprehensive Convention on International Terrorism to complement the existing counter-terrorism instruments. That proposed treaty has not yet been adopted.

== See also ==
- United Nations General Assembly First Committee
- United Nations General Assembly Second Committee
- United Nations General Assembly Third Committee
- United Nations General Assembly Fourth Committee
- United Nations General Assembly Fifth Committee
