= Patriotism =

Love and attachment to one's country

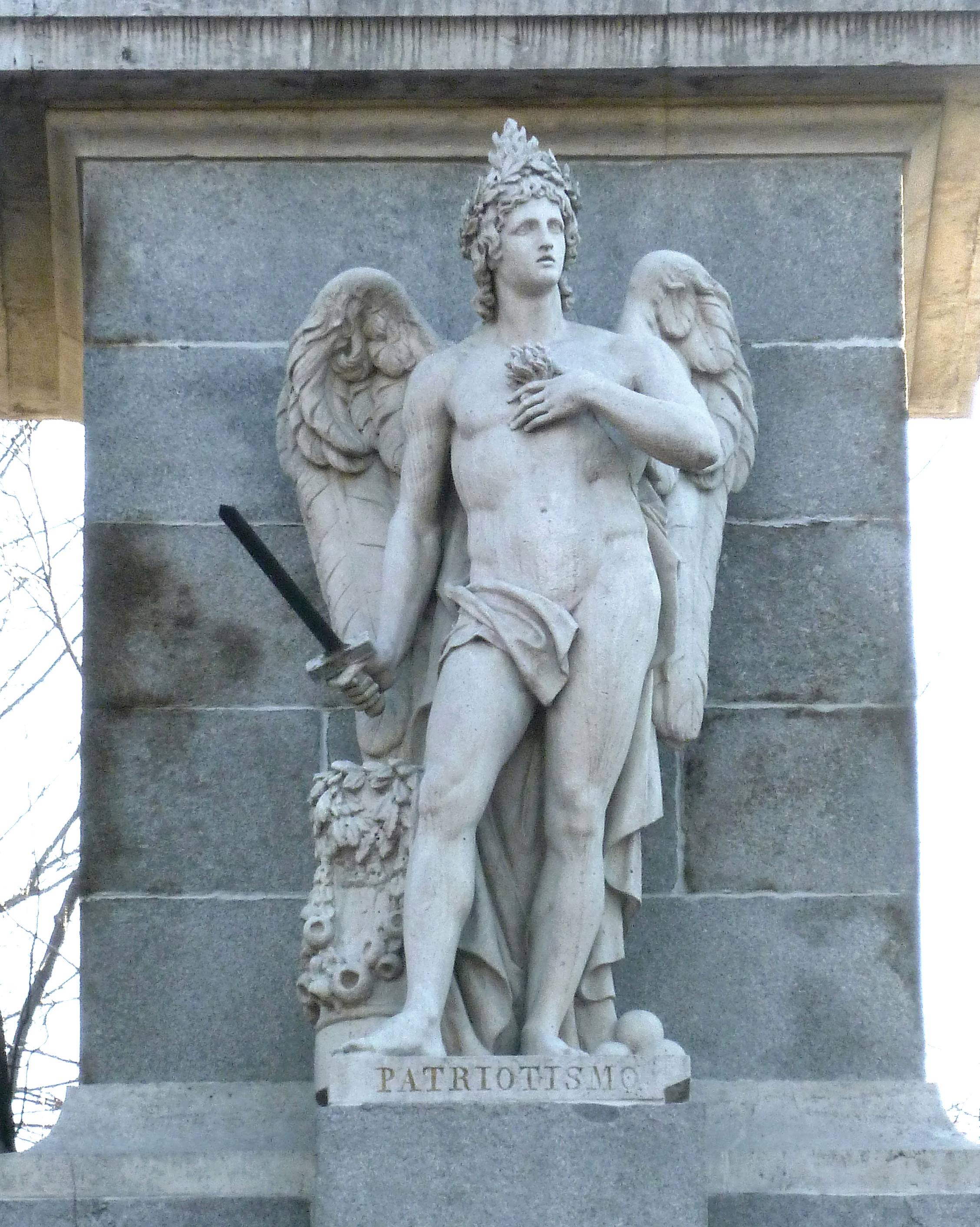
Allegory of patriotism in the Monument to the Fallen for Spain in Madrid (1840), by sculptor Francisco Pérez del Valle

Patriotism is the feeling of love, devotion, and a sense of attachment to one's country or state. This attachment can be a combination of different feelings for things such as the language of one's homeland, and its ethnic, cultural, political, or historical aspects. It may encompass a set of concepts closely related to nationalism, mostly civic nationalism and sometimes cultural nationalism or state nationalism.

== Terminology and usage ==
An excess of patriotism is called chauvinism; another related term is jingoism.

The English word "patriot" derived from "compatriot", in the 1590s, from Middle French patriote in the 15th century. The French words compatriote and patriote originated directly from Late Latin patriota "fellow-countryman" in the 6th century. From Greek patriotes "fellow countryman", from patrios "of one's fathers", patris "fatherland". The term patriot was "applied to barbarians who were perceived to be either uncivilized or primitive and who had only a common Patris or fatherland." The original European meaning of patriots applied to anyone who was a fellow countryman regardless of the socio-economic status.

Patriotism and nationalism originally shared a similar meaning in the 19th century, but their meanings and connotations gradually diverged. The Merriam-Webster defines patriotism as "love for or devotion to one's country". In contrast, nationalism is defined as "loyalty and devotion to a nation". Today, nationalism has gained a more negative connotation. In contrast, patriotism is used to refer to genuine pride in one's nation, recognizing both its merits and flaws. A similar distinction between the terms was also upheld by George Orwell, whose essay Notes on Nationalism, distinguished patriotism from the related concept of nationalism:

By 'patriotism' I mean devotion to a particular place and a particular way of life, which one believes to be the best in the world but has no wish to force upon other people. Patriotism is of its nature defensive, both militarily and culturally. Nationalism, on the other hand, is inseparable from the desire for power. The abiding purpose of every nationalist is to secure more power and more prestige, not for himself but for the nation or other unit in which he has chosen to sink his own individuality.

== History ==
An American poster with a patriotic theme (1917), issued by the U.S. Food Administration during World War I

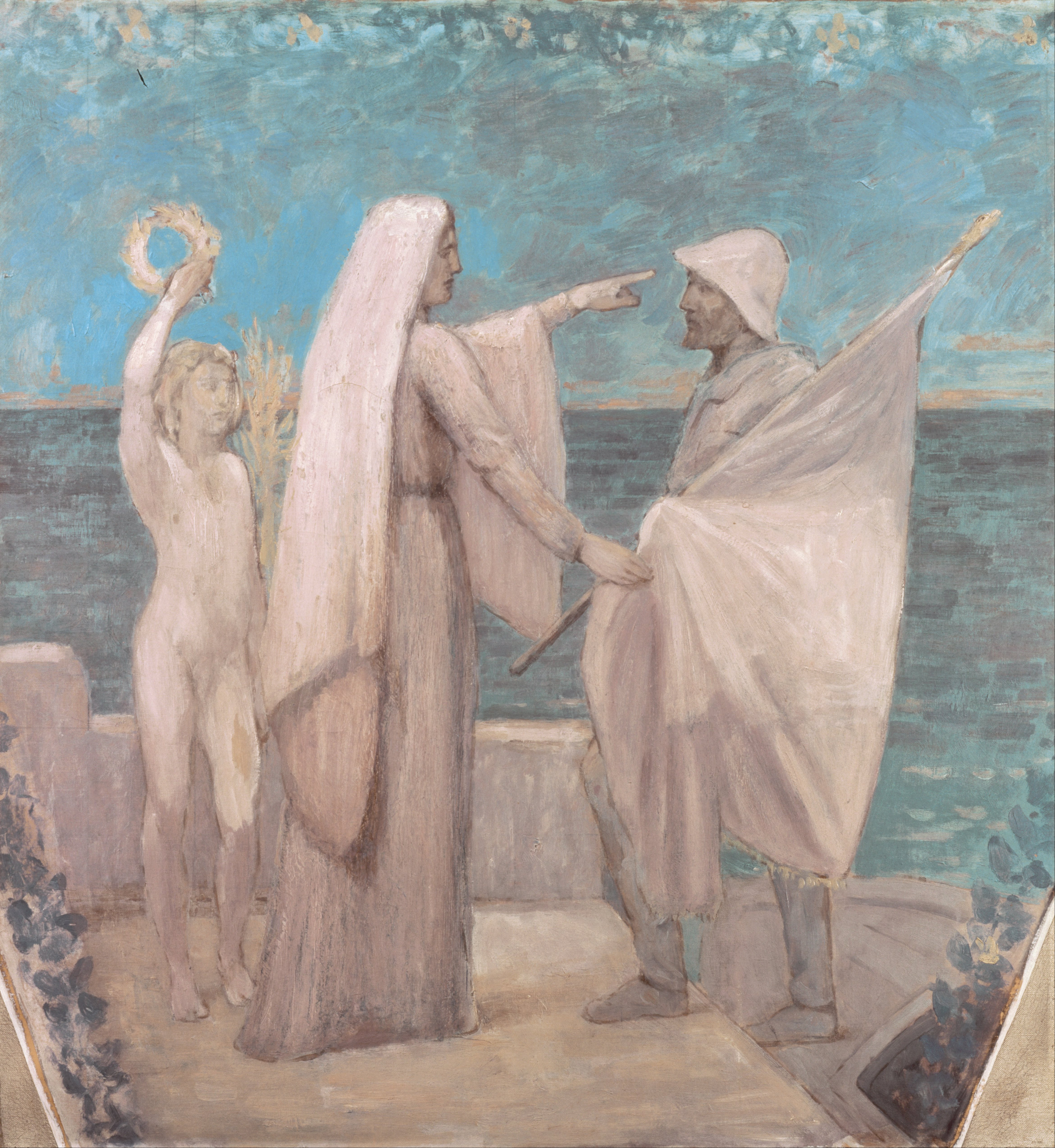
Study for Patriotism (c. 1893) by French Symbolist Pierre Puvis de Chavannes

The notions of civic virtue and group dedication can be found in cultures globally throughout history. For Enlightenment thinkers of 18th-century Europe, loyalty to the state was chiefly considered in contrast to loyalty to the Church. It was argued that clerics should not be allowed to teach in public schools since their patrie was heaven, so they could not inspire a love of the homeland in their students. One of the most influential proponents of this notion of patriotism was Jean-Jacques Rousseau.

Enlightenment thinkers also criticized what they saw as the excess of patriotism. In 1774, Samuel Johnson published The Patriot, a critique of what he viewed as false patriotism. On the evening of 7 April 1774, he made the famous statement, "Patriotism is the last refuge of the scoundrel". James Boswell, who reported this comment in his Life of Johnson, does not provide context for the quote. It has therefore been argued that Johnson was in fact attacking a false use of "patriotism" by contemporaries such as John Stuart, 3rd Earl of Bute (the patriot-minister) and his supporters; Johnson spoke elsewhere in favor of what he considered "true" patriotism. However, there is no direct evidence to contradict the widely held belief that Johnson's famous remark was a criticism of patriotism itself.

== Cultural aspects ==
Many patriotic people take pride in sharing a distinct, common culture, believing it to be central to their national identity and unity. Many are devoted to preserving their traditional culture and encourage cultural assimilation by people from other cultures. However, some of the more civic forms of patriotism tend to de-emphasize ethnic culture in favor of a shared political culture.

== Philosophical issues ==
Patriotism may be strengthened by adherence to a national religion (a civil religion or even a theocracy). This is the opposite of the separation of church and state demanded by Enlightenment thinkers, who saw patriotism and faith as similar yet opposing forces. Michael Billig and Jean Bethke Elshtain both argued that the difference between patriotism and faith is difficult to discern and relies largely on the attitude of the one doing the labeling. As Igor Primoratz notes, both involve identification with and special concern for a certain entity.

Christopher Heath Wellman, professor of philosophy at Washington University in St. Louis, says a popular view of the "patriotist" position is robust obligations to compatriots and only minimal samaritan responsibilities to foreigners. Wellman calls this position "patriotist" rather than "nationalist" to single out the members of territorial, political units rather than cultural groups.

=== Opposition ===
Voltaire stated that "It is lamentable, that to be a good patriot one must become the enemy of the rest of mankind." Arthur Schopenhauer wrote that "The cheapest sort of pride is national pride; for if a man is proud of his own nation, it argues that he has no qualities of his own of which a person can be proud."

Kōtoku Shūsui, a famous Japanese anarchist of the late 19th/early 20th century, devoted a large section of his widely read Imperialism, Monster of the Twentieth Century to a condemnation of patriotism. One of the many arguments is based on the Confucian value of empathy: "I am as convinced as Mencius that any man would rush without hesitation to rescue a child who was about to fall into a well... A human being moved by such selfless love and charity does not pause to think whether the child is a family member or a close relative. When he rescues the child from danger, he does not even ask himself whether the child is his own or belongs to another." Patriotism is used to dehumanize others whom we would naturally have empathy for. He argues, "[P]atriotism is a discriminating and arbitrary sentiment confined to those who belong to a single nation-state or live together within common national borders", a sentiment cultivated and used by militarists in their drive for war.

Marxists have taken various stances regarding patriotism. On one hand, Karl Marx famously stated that "The working men have no country" and that "the supremacy of the proletariat will cause [national differences] to vanish still faster." The same view is promoted by present-day Trotskyists such as Alan Woods, who is "in favor of tearing down all frontiers and creating a socialist world commonwealth." On the other hand, Marxist-Leninists and Maoists are usually in favor of socialist patriotism based on the theory of socialism in one country.

Against primordial arguments in favour of national patriotism, Eric Hobsbawm wrote that such a concept was - for most of human history - "so remote from the real experience of most human beings".

Anarchists oppose patriotism. This was exemplified by Emma Goldman, who stated:

Indeed, conceit, arrogance, and egotism are the essentials of patriotism. Let me illustrate. Patriotism assumes that our globe is divided into little spots, each one surrounded by an iron gate. Those who have had the fortune of being born on some particular spot, consider themselves better, nobler, grander, and more intelligent than the living beings inhabiting any other spot. It is, therefore, the duty of everyone living in that chosen spot to fight, kill, and die in an attempt to impose his superiority upon all the others.

=== Region-specific issues ===
In the European Union, thinkers such as Jürgen Habermas have advocated a "Euro-patriotism", but patriotism in Europe is usually directed at the nation-state and more often than not coincides with "Euroscepticism".

== Surveys ==
Several surveys have tried to measure patriotism, such as the Correlates of War project, which found some correlation between war propensity and patriotism. The results from different studies are time-dependent. For example, according to the project, patriotism in Germany before World War I ranked at or near the top. According to a study by the Identity Foundation, 60% of Germans were proud of their country in 2009. According to Statista, the figure was as high as 83%. In a 2020 Pew Research Center survey, 53% of participants surveyed in Germany said they were proud of their country, the highest figure among the nations surveyed (France: 45%; United Kingdom: 41%; United States: 39%).

Since 1981, the World Values Survey polls for national values and beliefs. The survey includes the question "Are you proud to be [insert nationality]?" with responses ranging from 1 (not proud) to 4 (very proud). They then use the average answer to create comparisons not only between nations but also between high- and low-income citizens.

In 2022, U.S. adults who said they were "extremely proud" to be an American hit an all-time low, according to a Gallup poll.

== See also ==
- Collective narcissism – Psychological tendency to exaggerate the positive image of one's social group
- Cultural identity – Identity or feeling of belonging to a group
- Patriot movement – American right-wing political movement
