= Alex P. Schmid =

Swiss-born Dutch academic (born 1943)

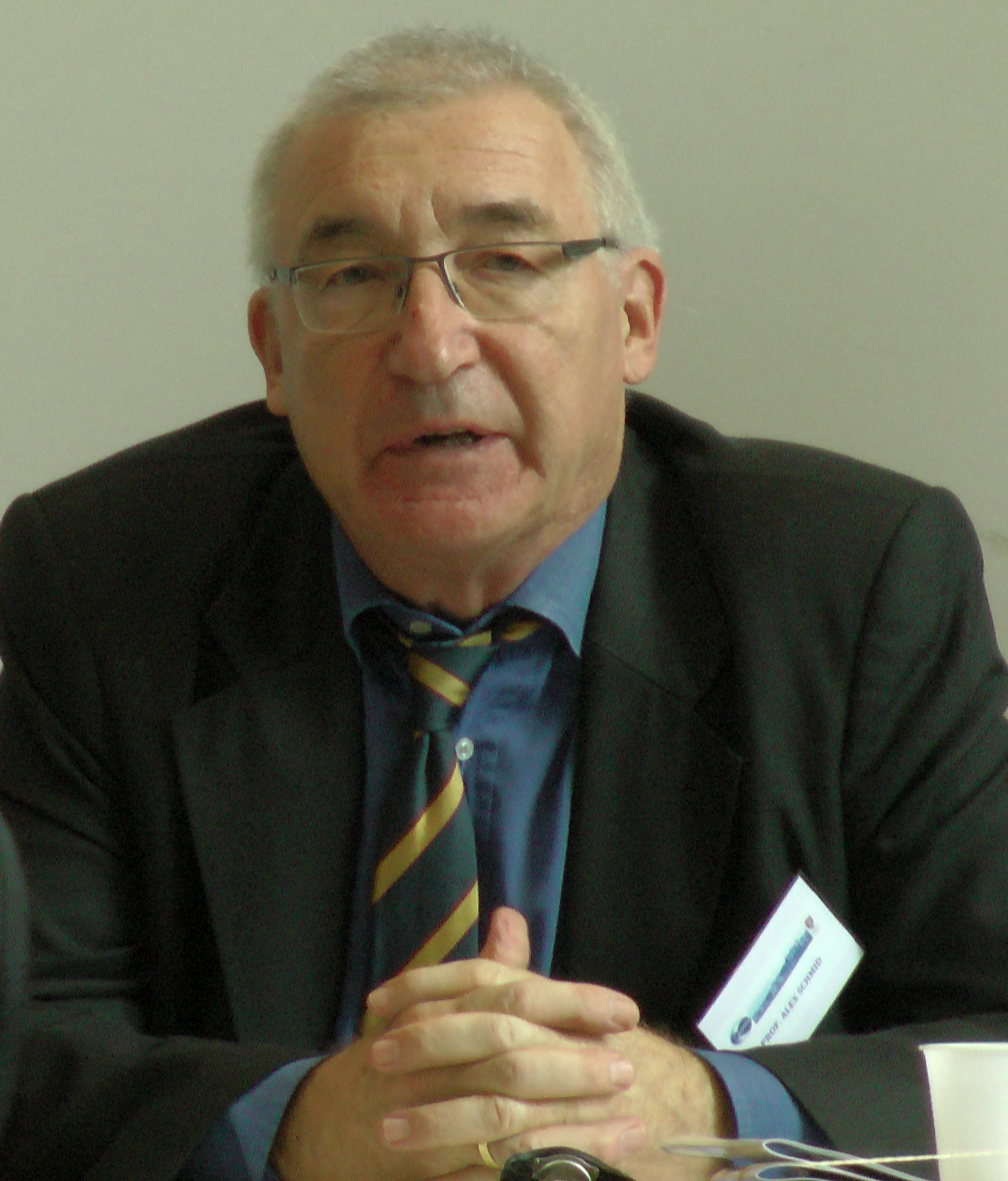
Alex Schmid at CSTPV, University of St. Andrews in September 2014

Alex Peter Schmid (born 1943) is a scholar in terrorism studies, who from 1999 to 2005 was Officer-in-Charge of the Terrorism Prevention Branch of the United Nations Office on Drugs and Crime in Vienna. He is particularly known for his work on the definition of terrorism.

Schmid has lived and worked mostly in the Netherlands, and as of 2021, he is research fellow at the International Centre for Counter-Terrorism (ICCT) in The Hague, and among his many other roles, is a director of the Terrorism Research Initiative and editor-in-chief of its journal, Perspectives on Terrorism.

== Early life and education ==
Alex Peter Schmid was born in Chur, Switzerland, in 1943. He studied history at the University of Zürich and was awarded a PhD from that institution.

== Career ==
From 1978 until 2018 Schmid worked in various roles at Leiden University in the Netherlands.

His first major work on terrorism, Political terrorism: A research guide to concepts, theories, data bases, and literature, was published in 1984.

Schmid was an Einstein Fellow at the Center for International Affairs at Harvard University (as part of a program funded via the Albert Einstein Institution), Cambridge, Massachusetts, in 1986–87, during which time he worked on a revised and expanded edition of his 1984 book Political Terrorism, published in 1988.

In 1992 Schmid was associate professor of International Relations at Leiden University, and a senior research fellow at the Center for the Study of Social Conflicts, and research director at the PIOOM Foundation (Interdisciplinary Research Programme on Root Causes of Human Rights Violations, 1988–2001).

He held the Synthesis Chair on Conflict Resolution at the Erasmus University in Rotterdam in the 1990s, before serving as Officer-in-Charge of the United Nations' Terrorism Prevention Branch, within the United Nations Office on Drugs and Crime (UNODC) in Vienna from 1999 to 2005.

In May 2006 he was appointed to a chair in International Relations at St Andrews University, and was at the same time Director of its Centre for the Study of Terrorism and Political Violence (CSTPV), holding both posts until 2009.

From 1 September 2010 to 30 June 2011, he was a research fellow at the Netherlands Institute for Advanced Study in the Humanities and Social Sciences (part of the Royal Netherlands Academy of Arts and Sciences, or KNAW), where he investigated "how courts in a number of countries have been dealing with political offenders in the recent past and how those accused of acts of terrorism have performed in courts".

He served on the executive board of the International Scientific and Professional Advisory Council (ISPAC) of the United Nations Crime Prevention and Criminal Justice Programme Network.

Schmid is a member of the World Society of Victimology and a Member of the Royal Netherlands Academy of Arts and Sciences (KNAW) since 2003 or 2004. He is a Member of the European Commission's Expert Group on Violent Radicalisation, and has been an advisor to Europol's TE-SAT (annual Terrorism Situation and Trend Report) since 2010.

As of 2021, he is research fellow at the International Centre for Counter-Terrorism (ICCT) in The Hague. He is also one of three directors of the Terrorism Research Initiative, a non-profit organisation based in North Carolina.

=== Journals ===
Schmid was previously co-editor of the Taylor & Francis journal Terrorism and Political Violence, and remains on the editorial board.

In 2009 he began editing the journal Perspectives on Terrorism, a publication of the Terrorism Research Initiative, he is as of 2021 editor-in-chief of the journal.

== Definitions of terrorism ==
Schmid's academic consensus definition of terrorism was first published in 1988 in the revised edition of Political Terrorism (Schmid and Jongman):

"Terrorism is an anxiety-inspiring method of repeated violent action, employed by (semi-) clandestine individual, group or state actors, for idiosyncratic, criminal or political reasons, whereby – in contrast to assassination – the direct targets of violence are not the main targets. The immediate human victims of violence are generally chosen randomly (targets of opportunity) or selectively (representative or symbolic targets) from a target population, and serve as message generators. Threat- and violence-based communication processes between terrorist (organization), (imperilled) victims, and main targets are used to manipulate the main target (audience(s)), turning it into a target of terror, a target of demands, or a target of attention, depending on whether intimidation, coercion, or propaganda is primarily sought".

He proposed a definition to the UN Commission on Crime Prevention and Criminal Justice (CCPCJ) in 1992, based on the already internationally accepted definition of war crimes, with the crucial words "peacetime equivalents of war crimes", but his proposal was not accepted. The Supreme Court of India referenced Schmid's this definition in a 2003 ruling (Madan Singh v. State of Bihar), "defin[ing] acts of terrorism veritably as 'peacetime equivalents of war crimes'".

The 1988 definition was updated in 2011 after "three rounds of consultations among academics and other professionals" and published in The Routledge Handbook of Terrorism Research. The revised definition is longer than most, after suggesting that the previous attempts, in its quest for consensus, had reduced the level of complexity in the definition, and ended up with "a high level of abstraction". The 2011 revised definition includes 12 points, the first of which is:

1. Terrorism refers, on the one hand, to a doctrine about the presumed effectiveness of a special form or tactic of fear-generating, coercive political violence and, on the other hand, to a conspiratorial practice of calculated, demonstrative, direct violent action without legal or moral restraints, targeting mainly civilians and non-combatants, performed for its propagandistic and psychological effects on various audiences and conflict parties;...

In an article published in Contemporary Voices in 2020, Schmid revisits the many challenges associated with defining terrorism, outlining six main reasons why this is the case:

1. It is a complex phenomenon.
2. Confusion exists in the terminology, specifically the terms “terror” and “terrorism” and the relationship between the two.
3. Terrorism often has more than one ultimate target.
4. Related to 3. above, there may be as many as 10 audiences for whom the terrorists are performing their acts.
5. There is confusion between terrorism and certain other forms of political violence.
6. There are many forms of terrorism; Schmid previously (1988) identified 12 types, but in recent years references to new types, such as cyberterrorism (arguably belonging to the definition) have been identified.

In this article, he also outlines the history of the search for a consensus definition, and the failure of international efforts, including a series of attempts by the UN since the 1972 Munich attack.

In his most recent major publication, the Handbook of Terrorism Prevention and Preparedness (2020–2021), Schmid again returns to the problem of the lack of acceptance of a common legal definition by all countries, because "the broader a definition, the more terrorism there is that ought to be countered and the more difficult it becomes to prevent it. If countries have different definitions of terrorism, extradition of terrorist suspects and mutual legal assistance become more difficult and often impossible...”. However the 2011 academic definition of terrorism, which is social-scientific rather than legal in nature, has gained a fair degree of acceptance among scholars.

== Recognition ==
The first edition of Political Terrorism (1984) won a national award for the best book in political science.

Schmid has been described as "a leading orthodox terrorism scholar".

== Selected works ==
Schmid has authored and edited over 200 publications, including:

- Violence as communication insurgent terrorism and the Western news media, London Sage, 1982, ISBN 978-0-8039-9772-1 (Co-authored by Janny de Graaf)
- Social defence and Soviet military power : an inquiry into the relevance of an alternative defence concept : report, Center for the Study of Social Conflict (C.O.M.T.), State University of Leiden, 1985, ISBN 978-90-346-0738-6 (Co-authored by Ellen Berends)
- Political Terrorism, co-authored with A. J. Jongman, first published in 1984 subtitled A research guide to concepts, theories, data bases, and literature; revised editions published in 1988 and 2005, subtitled A new guide to actors, authors, concepts, data bases, theories, and literature.
- Western responses to terrorism, F. Cass, 12 November 2012, ISBN 978-1-136-29746-5 (Editor, co-edited by Ronald D. Crelinsten)
- Thesaurus and glossary of early warning and conflict prevention terms, Synthesis Foundation, Erasmus University; London: Forum on Early Warning and Early Response, 2000, ISBN 978-0-9539328-0-1 (Co-authored with Sanam B. Anderlini)
- The Routledge Handbook of Terrorism Research (2011), edited by Schmid and including his revised consensus definition of terrorism, is a much-cited resource.
- Handbook of Terrorism Prevention and Preparedness, an open-access publication edited by Schmid, has been issued since November 2020 on the ICCT website, with a chapter published each week.
