= United Nations Committee on Relations with the Host Country =

- Established: 15 December 1971; 54 years ago
- Type: General Assembly Committee
- Legal status: Active
- Headquarters: UN Headquarters; New York, United States
- Members: 19 members
- Chair: Permanent Representative of Cyprus to the UN
- Parent organization: United Nations General Assembly

The United Nations Committee on Relations with the Host Country is a subsidiary body of the United Nations General Assembly that is responsible for dealing with a variety of issues concerning the relationship between the Host Country, the United States of America, and the United Nations in New York City.

The Committee meets periodically throughout the year as needed and reports through the Sixth Committee. While the Committee has 19 voting members, all UN Member States can participate in the work of the Committee as observers.

== History ==
The precursor for the Committee was created in 1969, when the General Assembly requested, via resolution 2618 (XXIV), that the Secretary-General convene an Informal Joint Committee on Host Country Relations in order to allow for a continuous exchange of views and exploration of problems between the UN community and the government of the host country.

In a December 1970 meeting, the General Assembly applauded the work of the Joint Committee and further urged the host country to take measures to ensure the protection of diplomatic missions to the UN, as well as that of their personnel. It also recommended that the Joint Committee review the implantation of both the Convention on the Privileges and Immunities of the United Nations and the Agreement between the United Nations and the United States of America regarding the Headquarters of the United Nations. Finally, the resolution also requested that the Secretary-General convene another session of the Joint Committee in January 1971, and thereafter as frequently as appropriate.

In December 1971, the General Assembly decided to establish a permanent Committee on Relations with the Host Country. This Committee would mainly concern itself with questions regarding of security of UN missions and their personnel, but may also consider any topic that would fall under the category of UN-Host Country relations. The Committee would be composed of 15 members to be chosen by the President of the General Assembly in consultation with the UN Regional Groups and with consideration of equitable geographic representation.

The composition and work of the Committee remained relatively unchanged until December 1997, when the General Assembly requested that the Committee review its membership and composition due to an increase in interest and concern of Member States in the work of the Committee. Consequently, in its report to the 53rd session of the General Assembly, the Committee recommended that its membership be increased by four members to reflect the growing membership of the Organization but to also ensure the effective functioning of the body. This recommendation was adopted in December 1998, when the General Assembly agreed to expand the Committee, bringing the membership of the Committee up to 19. This was the first change to the Committee's structure since its creation in 1971. The new seats on the Committee were distributed evenly among the African, Asian, Latin American and Caribbean and Eastern European States Regional Groups.

== Mandate ==
The list of topics that are considered by the Committee can be found in Annex I of its annual report. For the 74th Session of the General Assembly, the topics it considered were:

- Questions of the security of missions and the safety of their personnel
- Consideration of and recommendations on issues arising in connection with the implementation of the Agreement between the United Nations and the United States of America regarding the Headquarters of the United Nations
- Responsibilities of permanent missions to the United Nations and their personnel, in particular, the problem of claims of financial indebtedness and procedures to be followed with a view to resolving the issues relating thereto
- Housing for diplomatic personnel and for Secretariat staff
- Question of privileges and immunities
- Host country activities: activities to assist members of the United Nations community
- Transportation: use of motor vehicles, parking and related matters
- Insurance, education and health
- Public relations of the United Nations community in the host city and the question of encouraging the mass media to publicize the functions and status of permanent missions to the United Nations
- Consideration and adoption of the report of the Committee to the General Assembly

== Members ==
=== Current members ===
The members of the Committee are:

- Bulgaria
- Canada
- China
- Costa Rica
- Côte d'Ivoire
- Cuba
- Cyprus
- France
- Honduras
- Hungary
- Iraq
- Libya
- Malaysia
- Mali
- Russian Federation
- Senegal
- Spain
- United Kingdom of Great Britain and Northern Ireland
- United States of America

=== Historical members ===
Former members of the Committee include:

- Argentina
- Guyana
  - Replaced by Costa Rica and Honduras on 1 January 1974
- United Republic of Tanzania
  - Replaced by Senegal on 1 January 1977
- Union of Soviet Socialist Republics
  - Succeeded by Russian Federation on 25 December 1991

=== Bureau ===
The bureau of the Committee is composed of a Chair, three Vice-Chairs, a Rapporteur and a representative of the Host Country. The countries filling the seats of the Chair, Vice-Chairs and Rapporteur have not changed since the first sessions of the Committee. The Bureau of the Committee is as follows:

Country	Position
Cyprus	Chair
Bulgaria	Vice-Chair
Canada	Vice-Chair
Côte d’Ivoire	Vice-Chair
Costa Rica	Rapporteur
United States of America	Ex officio member
