= Brenda Lutz =

Brenda J. Lutz is an independent scholar, consultant, reviewer, and author in Massachusetts.

Lutz has a Ph.D. in Politics from the University of Dundee in Scotland, and has written numerous books, articles, and chapters on global terrorism, international political violence, and animal welfare, many with James M. Lutz, Ph.D. Her books include Global Terrorism (1st edition 2004, 2nd edition 2008, third edition 2014, fourth edition 2019), Terrorism: Origins and Evolution (Palgrave, 2005), Terrorism in America (Palgrave, 2007), Terrorism: The Basics (Routledge, 2011) and Brenda J. Lutz and James M. Lutz, Globalization and the Economic Consequences of Terrorism (London: Palgrave, 2017).

Recently, she has been concentrating on the economic effects that terrorism can have and on the links between globalization and terrorism. Other topics Dr. Lutz researches and writes on include the anti-factory farming movement and animal welfare pressure groups, including articles in Global Economy Journal and Society and Animals. She continues her ongoing efforts to end the plight of animals in factory farms and to help other abused animals. Lutz has presented at conferences in the United States and all around the globe.

== Bibliography ==
=== Books ===
- James M. Lutz and Brenda J. Lutz, Global Terrorism, 4th ed. (London: Routledge, 2019).
- Brenda J. Lutz and James M. Lutz, Globalization and the Economic Consequences of Terrorism (London: Palgrave, 2017).
- James M. Lutz and Brenda J. Lutz, Global Terrorism, 3rd ed. (London: Routledge, 2014)
- James M. Lutz and Brenda J. Lutz, Terrorism: The Basics (London: Routledge, 2011).
- James M. Lutz and Brenda J. Lutz, Global Terrorism, 2nd ed. (London: Routledge, 2008).
- Brenda J. Lutz and James M. Lutz (eds.), Global Terrorism, Sage Library of International Relations (four volume collection) (London: Sage, 2008).
- Brenda J. Lutz and James M. Lutz, Terrorism in America (New York: Palgrave, 2007).
- James M. Lutz and Brenda J. Lutz, Terrorism: Origins and Evolution (New York: Palgrave, 2005). ("Eleven editions published between 2005 and 2006 in English and held by 432 libraries worldwide", according to WorldCat)
- James M. Lutz and Brenda J. Lutz, Global Terrorism (London: Routledge, 2004).

=== Articles ===
- Carol K. G. Lutz, Brenda J. Lutz & James M. Lutz, “Russian Foreign Policy Management and Manipulation with the Soviet Successor States,” Terrorism and Political Violence, Vol. 31, No. 1 (2019), 84-97.
- Brenda J. Lutz, "Sympathy, Empathy, and the Plight of Animals in Factory Farms," Society & Animals Vol. 24, No. 3 (2016), 250-268.
- Brenda J. Lutz and James M. Lutz, “Globalisation and Terrorism in the Middle East,” Perspectives on Terrorism, Vol. 9, No. 5 (2015), 27-46.
- Brenda J. Lutz and James M. Lutz, "Globalization, Risk Taking, and Violence: Too Much Too Soon in the Late Roman Republic and Pre-Renaissance Italian Cities," Cambridge Review of International Affairs, Vol. 28, No. 2 (2015) pp. 175–190
- James M. Lutz and Brenda J. Lutz, "Governmental Roles in International Markets," Economic Forum, Vol. 531, No. 10 (2014), pp. 164–170 [In Chinese].
- Brenda J. Lutz and James M. Lutz, "John Brown as Guerrilla and Terrorist," Small Wars and Insurgencies, Vol. 25, No. 5/6 (2014), pp. 1039–1054.
- Brenda J. Lutz and James M. Lutz, "Economic, Social, and Political Globalization and Terrorism," Journal of Political, Economic, and Social Studies Vol. 39, No. 2 (2014), pp. 186–218.
- Brenda J. Lutz and James M. Lutz, "Terrorism and Its Impact on Foreign Economic Activity in Sub-Saharan Africa," Journal of Business and Economics, Vol. 5, No. 4 (2014), pp. 524–33.
- Brenda J. Lutz and James M. Lutz, "Terrorism in Sub-Saharan Africa: The Missing Data," Insight on Africa, Vol. 5, No. 2 (2013), pp. 169–83.
- James M. Lutz and Brenda J. Lutz, "The Role of Foreign Influences in Early Terrorism: Examples and Implications for Understanding Modern Terrorism," Perspectives on Terrorism, Vol. 7, No. 2 (2013), pp. 5–22.
- Brenda J. Lutz and James M. Lutz, "Interest Groups and Animal Rights Legislation," Animals and Society, Vol. 19, No. 3 (2011).DOI: 10.1163/156853011X578929
- James M. Lutz and Brenda J. Lutz, "Democracy and Terrorism," Perspectives on Terrorism, Vol. 4, No. 1 (2010).
- Brenda J. Lutz and James M. Lutz, "Factory Farming and Potential Problems in International Trade," Global Economy Journal, Vol. 9, No. 3 (2009).
- James M. Lutz and Brenda J. Lutz, "How Successful Is Terrorism?" Forum on Public Policy, (September 2009).
- James M. Lutz and Brenda J. Lutz, "The Effects of Terrorism on Foreign Investment and Tourism: The Example of Latin America," Journal of Social, Political, and Economic Studies, Vol. 31, No. 3 (Fall 2006).
- Brenda J. Lutz and James M. Lutz, "Political Violence in the Republic of Rome: Nothing New under the Sun," Government and Opposition, Vol. 41, No. 4 (October, 2006).
- Brenda J. Lutz and James M. Lutz, "Terrorism as Economic Warfare," Global Economy Journal, Vol. 6, No. 2 (2006).
- Brenda J. Lutz, Georgia Wralstad Ulmschneider, and James M. Lutz, "The Trial of the Guildford Four: Government Error or Government Persecution," Terrorism and Political Violence, Vol. 14, No. 4 (Winter 2002).
- Brenda J. Lutz, James M. Lutz, and Georgia Wralstad Ulmschneider, "British Trials of Irish Nationalist Defendants: The Quality of Justice Strained," Studies in Conflict and Terrorism, Vol. 25, No. 4, (July/August 2002).
- Brenda Davis Lutz and James M. Lutz, "Gypsies as Victims of the Holocaust," Holocaust and Genocide Studies, 9, 3 (1995).
