= Terrorist Bombings Convention =

1997 United Nations anti-terrorism treaty

International Convention for the Suppression of Terrorist Bombings
- Type: Anti-terrorism, international criminal law
- Drafted: 15 December 1997
- Signed: 12 January 1998
- Location: New York City, United States
- Effective: 23 May 2001
- Condition: 22 ratifications
- Signatories: 58
- Parties: 170
- Depositary: United Nations Secretary-General
- Languages: Arabic, Chinese, English, French, Russian, and Spanish

The Terrorist Bombings Convention (formally the International Convention for the Suppression of Terrorist Bombings) is a 1997 United Nations treaty designed to criminalize terrorist bombings.

The convention describes terrorist bombings as the unlawful and intentional use of explosives in public places with intention to kill, to injure, or to cause extensive destruction to compel a government or an international organization to do or to abstain from doing such acts.

The convention also seeks to promote police and judicial co-operation to prevent, investigate and punish those acts.

As of September 2018, the convention has been ratified by 170 states.

== See also ==
- Definition of terrorism
- International conventions on terrorism
- United Nations General Assembly Sixth Committee (Legal)
