= International Centre for Counter-Terrorism =

Independent think tank

- Abbreviation: ICCT
- Formation: 2010
- Founded at: The Hague
- Type: Independent organisation
- Director: Thomas Renard
- Website: icct.nl

The International Centre for Counter-Terrorism (ICCT) is an independent think-and-do tank providing multidisciplinary policy advice and practical support focused on prevention, the rule of law and current and emerging threats.

== History ==
ICCT was established in The Hague in 2010, after an initiative originating in the Netherlands' parliament with a motion by Dutch Member of Parliament Coskun Çörüz in April 2008. ICCT is supported by the Netherlands Ministry of Foreign Affairs and ICCT began as a unique partnership between three renowned institutions based in The Hague: the T.M.C. Asser Institute, the Netherlands Institute of International Relations Clingendael, and the Institute for Security and Global Affairs (ISGA) at Leiden University.

== Staff ==
The director of ICCT is Thomas Renard.

ICCT's staff includes a number of scholars and practitioners with expertise in the fields of counter-terrorism and international diplomacy. Alex P. Schmid is a distinguished research fellow at ICCT and director of the Terrorism Research Initiative, an international network of scholars working to enhance international security through collaborative research, and he was formerly Officer-in-Charge of the Terrorism Prevention Branch of the United Nations.

== Activities ==
ICCT's work includes countering violent extremism, rule of law, preventing and countering violent extremism, foreign fighters, country and regional analysis, rehabilitation, civil society engagement and victims' voices.

ICCT convenes forums, workshops and Live Briefing on topics such as radicalization, foreign fighters, the legal boundaries of the battlefield, administrative measures and Gender and extremism.

== European and international cooperation ==
ICCT engages with international organisations, government departments, NGOs, academic institutions, think tanks and civil society organisations. The centre works closely with the North Atlantic Treaty Organization (NATO) and various agencies of the United Nations such as the Counter-Terrorism Committee Executive Directorate (CTED); the UN Counter-Terrorism Implementation Task Force (CTITF); the United Nations Interregional Crime and Justice Research Institute (UNICRI); and the Global Counterterrorism Forum (GCTF).
