= Terrorist Financing Convention =

Treaty against the financing of terrorism

International Convention for the Suppression of the Financing of Terrorism
- Type: International criminal law
- Drafted: 9 December 1999
- Signed: 10 January 2000
- Location: New York, United States
- Effective: 10 April 2002
- Condition: 22 Ratifications
- Signatories: 132
- Parties: 191
- Depositary: United Nations Secretary-General
- Languages: Arabic, Chinese, English, French, Russian, and Spanish

The Terrorist Financing Convention (formally, the International Convention for the Suppression of the Financing of Terrorism) is a 1999 United Nations treaty designed to criminalize acts of financing acts of terrorism. The convention also seeks to promote police and judicial co-operation to prevent, investigate and punish the financing of such acts. The Convention was negotiated following the 1996 UNGA Resolution 51/210 and a G-8 counter-terrorism initiative, and adopted by consensus by the UN General Assembly as Resolution 54/109 on 9 December 1999 at its fourth session. As of May 2026, the treaty has been ratified by 191 states; in terms of universality, it is therefore one of the most successful anti-terrorism treaties in history.

== Content ==
The Convention’s scope is deliberately limited to funding of violent acts: it does not define “terrorism” generally, but defines a financing offence by reference to specific violent acts. According to Article 2.1, it is a criminal offense to provide or gather funds—whether directly or through others—if done knowingly and with the intent that the money will be used, even partly, to commit an act that harms or kills civilians or non-combatants. The act must also aim to instill fear in the public or pressure a government or international body to take or avoid certain actions.

The Convention establishes binding legal obligations on State Parties to either prosecute or extradite any individual within their jurisdiction who is alleged to have committed an offence as defined under Article 2. This includes not only the direct commission of such an act, but also attempts to commit the offence, participation as an accomplice, the organization or direction of others to commit the act, or any other form of contribution to the offence by a group acting with a common purpose. These obligations apply irrespective of the location where the conduct in question occurred.

Article 8 of the Convention focuses on financial measures. It requires each State Party to take appropriate steps, in line with its domestic law, “to identify, detect, and freeze or seize any funds used to finance terrorism.” This includes both funds intended for terrorist acts and proceeds generated from such acts. States must also establish legal procedures for the forfeiture of these funds. Moreover, state parties commit themselves not to use bank secrecy as a justification for refusing to co-operate in the suppression of terrorist financing.

The Convention also mandates mutual legal assistance and intelligence sharing. States Parties agree to assist each other in investigating and prosecuting terrorist financing. Article 12 requires a receiving State to furnish information or evidence to a requesting State with respect to offences under the Convention. Specifically, state parties cannot deny a legal assistance request by citing bank secrecy. Article 10 similarly provides for extradition: if the suspect is present in one State, that State must submit the case for prosecution or extradite the person to another State with jurisdiction. The treaty does not allow exceptions for “political offences” or “fiscal offences”; under Articles 13 and 14, the financing of terrorism is explicitly excluded from being treated as either, for the purposes of extradition or mutual legal assistance. This means that States cannot refuse to cooperate on those grounds. Additionally, Article 24 states that if disputes arise over the interpretation of the treaty and cannot be resolved through negotiation, they may be referred to the International Court of Justice (ICJ).

== Entry into force and ratifications ==
The Convention requires the deposit of 22 instruments of ratification to enter into force. The treaty entered into force on 10 April 2002, thirty days after the 22nd ratification was deposited. It has been ratified by 191 states, which includes all but five member states of the United Nations plus the Cook Islands, the Holy See, and Niue. It has not been ratified by Burundi, Chad, Eritrea, Somalia, and Tuvalu. (Burundi and Somalia have signed the convention but have not yet ratified it.)

The Convention’s obligations have also been integrated into broader international frameworks. The Financial Action Task Force (FATF), for instance, incorporates its provisions into its Recommendations and mutual evaluation process. As a result, both FATF standards and UN Security Council resolutions—such as Resolutions 1267 and 1373—effectively require countries to criminalize terrorist financing and to take measures to freeze related funds in accordance with the Convention.

== Impact ==
In 2017 Ukraine opened a case against Russia for supporting pro-Russian terrorist groups during Russian intervention in Ukraine and for racial discrimination against Crimean Tatars. On 31 January 2024, the ICJ delivered its judgment. The Court found Russia to be in partial breach of the Convention for not conducting an adequate investigation into financial aspects linked to the MH17 incident, thus failing in its obligation to either prosecute or extradite suspects. It also clarified that the Convention applies strictly to the movement of funds, and does not cover the provision of weapons. Most of Ukraine’s other claims were dismissed without compensation; the judgment is the ICJ’s first substantive interpretation of the Convention.

== See also ==
- Definition of terrorism
- International conventions on terrorism
- United Nations General Assembly Sixth Committee (Legal)
