= Nuclear Terrorism Convention =

2005 United Nations treaty

International Convention for the Suppression of Acts of Nuclear Terrorism
- Type: Anti-terrorism, international criminal law
- Drafted: 13 April 2005
- Signed: 14 September 2005
- Location: New York City, United States
- Effective: 7 July 2007
- Condition: 22 ratifications
- Signatories: 115
- Parties: 124
- Depositary: United Nations Secretary-General
- Languages: Arabic, Chinese, English, French, Russian, and Spanish

The Nuclear Terrorism Convention (formally, the International Convention for the Suppression of Acts of Nuclear Terrorism) is a 2005 United Nations treaty designed to criminalize acts of nuclear terrorism and to promote police and judicial cooperation to prevent, investigate and punish those acts. As of January 2024, the convention has 115 signatories and 127 state parties, including the nuclear powers China, France, India, Russia, the United Kingdom, and the United States. Most recently, Ecuador ratified the convention on January 19, 2024.

The Convention covers a broad range of acts and possible targets, including nuclear power plants and nuclear reactors; covers threats and attempts to commit such crimes or to participate in them, as an accomplice; stipulates that offenders shall be either extradited or prosecuted; encourages States to cooperate in preventing terrorist attacks by sharing information and assisting each other in connection with criminal investigations and extradition proceedings; and, deals with both crisis situations, assisting States to solve the situations and post-crisis situations by rendering nuclear material safe through the International Atomic Energy Agency (IAEA).

In April 2005, the United Nations General Assembly adopted the draft International Convention for the Suppression of Acts of Nuclear Terrorism by consensus as Resolution A/RES/59/290 during its 91st plenary meeting. Prior to that, negotiations were conducted through sessions of an Ad Hoc Working Group and the Legal (Sixth) Committee from 1999 to 2005—spanning the fifty‑fourth to fifty‑ninth General Assembly sessions—to finalize the text.

Following adoption, the Convention was opened for signature at United Nations Headquarters in New York from 14 September 2005 until 31 December 2006 in accordance with Article 24. It formally entered into force on 7 July 2007, which occurred 30 days after the deposit of the twenty‑second instrument of ratification in line with Article 25(1) of the Convention.

== Definition of the crime of nuclear terrorism ==
The Convention defines offences as committed when a person unlawfully and intentionally engages in specific conduct involving radioactive material or nuclear facilities. This includes any person who possesses radioactive material or makes or possesses a device either with an intention to cause harm to human beings or to the environment. It further criminalizes any person who misuses radioactive material or poses a threat to any nuclear facility. The provisions of the convention establish a clear threshold of criminal liability based on both the unlawfulness of the conduct and the presence of specific harmful intents.

The Convention clearly defines its limits. It does not override existing international laws, especially those under the UN Charter or international humanitarian law. It also does not apply to the conduct of armed forces during armed conflict or to official military duties by State forces, as long as those actions are already covered by other international legal rules. Importantly, this exclusion doesn’t mean such acts are automatically lawful—they can still be prosecuted under other applicable laws. The Convention also avoids taking any position on whether the use or threat of use of nuclear weapons by States is legal. Overall, it works within existing international legal frameworks without changing the legal status of military actions or nuclear weapons.

== States parties ==
As of May 2024, 124 states are parties to the convention.

State party	Signed	Accessed	Entry into force
Afghanistan	29 December 2005	25 March 2013	24 April 2013
Albania	23 November 2005	21 August 2023	20 September 2023
Algeria	—	3 March 2011	2 April 2011
Antigua and Barbuda	—	1 December 2009	31 December 2009
Argentina	14 September 2005	8 April 2016	8 May 2016
Armenia	15 September 2005	22 September 2010	22 October 2010
Australia	14 September 2005	16 March 2012	15 April 2012
Austria	15 September 2005	14 September 2006	7 July 2007
Azerbaijan	15 September 2005	28 January 2009	27 February 2009
Bahrain	—	4 May 2010	3 June 2010
Bangladesh	—	7 June 2007	7 July 2007
Belarus	15 September 2005	13 March 2007	7 July 2007
Belgium	14 September 2005	2 October 2009	1 November 2009
Benin	15 September 2005	2 November 2017	2 December 2017
Bosnia and Herzegovina	7 December 2005	29 June 2017	29 July 2017
Botswana	—	12 July 2021	12 July 2021
Brazil	16 September 2005	25 September 2009	25 October 2009
Burundi	29 March 2006	24 September 2008	24 October 2008
Canada	14 September 2005	21 November 2013	21 December 2013
Central African Republic	—	19 February 2008	20 March 2008
Chile	22 September 2005	27 September 2010	20 March 2008
China (Note: The Convention does not apply to Hong Kong.)	14 September 2005	8 November 2010	8 December 2010
Comoros	—	12 March 2007	7 July 2007
Congo		14 November 2023	14 December 2023
Costa Rica	15 September 2005	21 February 2013	23 March 2013
Côte d'Ivoire	—	12 March 2012	11 April 2012
Croatia	16 September 2005	30 May 2007	7 July 2007
Cuba	—	17 June 2009	17 July 2009
Cyprus	15 September 2005	28 January 2008	27 February 2008
Czech Republic	15 September 2005	25 July 2006	7 July 2007
Congo, Democratic Republic of the	—	23 September 2010	23 October 2010
Denmark (Note: The Convention does not apply to the Faroe Islands or Greenland.)	14 September 2005	20 March 2007	7 July 2007
Djibouti	14 June 2006	25 April 2014	25 May 2014
Dominican Republic	—	11 June 2008	11 July 2008
El Salvador	16 September 2005	27 November 2006	7 July 2007
Fiji	—	15 May 2008	14 June 2008
Finland	14 September 2005	13 January 2009	12 February 2009
France	14 September 2005	11 September 2013	11 October 2013
Gabon	15 September 2005	1 October 2007	31 October 2007
Georgia	—	23 April 2010	23 May 2010
Germany	15 September 2005	8 February 2008	9 March 2008
Guatemala	20 September 2005	26 September 2018	25 October 2018
Guinea-Bissau	—	6 August 2008	5 September 2008
Hungary	14 September 2005	12 April 2007	7 July 2007
India	24 July 2006	1 December 2006	7 July 2007
Indonesia	—	30 September 2014	30 October 2014
Iraq	—	13 May 2013	12 June 2013
Italy	14 September 2005	21 October 2016	20 November 2016
Jamaica	5 December 2006	27 December 2013	26 January 2014
Japan	15 September 2005	3 August 2007	2 September 2007
Jordan	16 November 2005	29 January 2016	28 February 2016
Kazakhstan	16 September 2005	31 July 2008	2 September 2007
Kenya	15 September 2005	13 April 2006	7 July 2007
Kiribati	15 September 2005	26 September 2008	26 October 2008
Korea, South	16 September 2005	29 May 2014	28 June 2014
Kuwait	16 September 2005	5 September 2013	5 October 2013
Kyrgyzstan	5 May 2006	2 October 2007	1 November 2007
Latvia	16 September 2005	25 July 2006	7 July 2007
Lebanon	23 September 2005	13 November 2006	7 July 2007
Lesotho	16 September 2005	22 September 2010	22 October 2010
Libya	16 September 2005	22 December 2008	21 January 2009
Liechtenstein	16 September 2005	25 September 2009	21 January 2009
Lithuania	16 September 2005	19 July 2007	18 August 2007
Luxembourg	15 September 2005	2 October 2008	1 November 2008
Madagascar	15 September 2005	15 February 2017	17 March 2017
Malawi	—	7 October 2009	6 November 2009
Mali	—	5 November 2009	5 December 2009
Malta	15 September 2005	26 September 2012	26 October 2012
Mauritania	—	28 April 2008	28 May 2008
Mexico	12 January 2006	27 June 2006	7 July 2007
Moldova	16 September 2005	18 April 2008	18 May 2008
Mongolia	3 November 2005	6 October 2006	7 July 2007
Montenegro	23 October 2006	13 February 2019	15 March 2019
Morocco	19 April 2006	31 March 2010	30 April 2010
Namibia	—	2 September 2016	2 October 2016
Nauru	—	24 August 2010	23 September 2010
Netherlands	16 September 2005	30 June 2010	30 July 2010
New Zealand (Note: The Convention does not apply to Tokelau.)	14 September 2005	18 March 2016	17 April 2016
Nicaragua	15 September 2005	25 February 2009	27 March 2009
Niger	—	2 July 2008	1 August 2008
Nigeria	—	25 September 2012	25 October 2012
North Macedonia	16 September 2005	19 March 2007	7 July 2007
Norway	16 September 2005	20 February 2014	22 March 2014
Oman	—	21 October 2022	20 November 2022
Palau	15 September 2005	19 January 2024	18 February 2024
Panama	21 February 2006	21 June 2007	21 July 2007
Paraguay	16 September 2005	29 January 2009	28 February 2009
Peru	14 September 2005	29 May 2009	28 June 2009
Poland	14 September 2005	8 April 2010	8 May 2010
Portugal	21 September 2005	25 September 2014	25 October 2014
Qatar	16 February 2006	15 January 2014	14 February 2014
Romania	14 September 2005	24 January 2007	7 July 2007
Russia	14 September 2005	29 January 2007	7 July 2007
Saint Kitts and Nevis	—	13 August 2020	11 September 2020
Saint Lucia	—	12 November 2012	12 December 2012
Saint Vincent and the Grenadines	—	8 July 2010	7 August 2010
San Marino	—	16 December 2014	15 January 2015
Saudi Arabia	26 December 2006	7 December 2007	6 January 2008
Serbia	15 September 2005	26 September 2006	7 July 2007
Singapore	1 December 2006	2 August 2017	1 September 2017
Slovakia	15 September 2005	23 March 2006	7 July 2007
Slovenia	14 September 2005	17 December 2009	16 January 2010
Solomon Islands	—	24 September 2009	24 October 2009
South Africa	14 September 2005	9 May 2007	7 July 2007
Spain	14 September 2005	22 February 2007	7 July 2007
Sri Lanka	14 September 2005	27 September 2007	27 October 2007
State of Palestine		29 December 2017	
Sweden	14 September 2005	18 August 2014	17 September 2014
Switzerland	14 September 2005	15 October 2008	14 November 2008
Tajikistan	14 September 2005	29 June 2022	29 July 2022
Thailand	14 September 2005	2 May 2019	1 June 2019
Tunisia	—	28 September 2010	28 October 2010
Turkey	14 September 2005	24 September 2012	24 October 2012
Turkmenistan	—	28 March 2008	27 April 2008
Ukraine	14 September 2005	25 September 2007	25 October 2007
United Arab Emirates	—	10 January 2008	9 February 2008
United Kingdom	14 September 2005	24 September 2009	24 October 2009
United States	14 September 2005	30 September 2015	30 October 2015
Uruguay	16 September 2005	4 March 2016	3 April 2016
Uzbekistan	—	29 April 2008	29 May 2008
Vietnam	—	27 September 2016	27 October 2016
Yemen	—	13 October 2014	12 November 2014
Zambia	—	7 April 2017	7 May 2017
Zimbabwe	—	28 September 2023	28 October 2023

=== Signatories which are not parties ===
The following states have signed, but not ratified, the convention.

State	Signed
Andorra	11 May 2006
Bulgaria	14 September 2005
Burkina Faso	21 September 2005
Cambodia	7 December 2006
Colombia	1 November 2006
East Timor	16 September 2005
Ecuador	15 September 2005
Egypt	20 September 2005
Estonia	14 September 2005
Eswatini	15 September 2005
Ghana	6 November 2006
Greece	15 September 2005
Guinea	16 September 2005
Guyana	15 September 2005
Iceland	16 September 2005
Ireland	15 September 2005
Israel	27 December 2006
Liberia	16 September 2005
Malaysia	16 September 2005
Mauritius	14 September 2005
Monaco	14 September 2005
Mozambique	1 May 2006
Philippines	15 September 2005
Rwanda	6 March 2006
São Tomé and Príncipe	19 December 2005
Senegal	21 September 2005
Seychelles	7 October 2005
Sierra Leone	14 September 2005
Syria	14 September 2005
Togo	15 September 2005

== See also ==
- Nuclear terrorism
- Definition of terrorism
- International conventions on terrorism
