= Igor Primoratz =

Croatian philosopher

- Igor Primorac
- Born: Игорь Приморац; 6 October 1945 (age 81)

Igor Primoratz (born October 6, 1945, in Moscow), also Igor Primorac, is a Croatian Israeli Australian philosopher who is occupied with ethics, applied ethics, philosophy of sex, philosophy of punishment, philosophy of war and terrorism, and philosophy of law. He taught at the University of Melbourne, Australian National University, Hebrew University, Faculty of Philosophy in Zagreb and other universities. His publications were mostly in English.

== Works ==
Some of his major works include:

- Prestup i kazna (1978.)
- Banquov duh (Banquos Geist, 1986.)
- Kazna, pravda i opće dobro (, 1989.)
- Primoratz, Igor. Ethics and Sex. London; New York : Routledge, 1999.
- Filozofija na djelu: Rasprave i ogledi iz praktičke filozofije (2001.)
- Etika na djelu, 2006.
- (ed.) Human Sexuality, 1997.
- (ed.) Suvremena filozofija seksualnosti (Contemporary Philosophy of Sexuality), 2003., KruZak, Zagreb
- Primoratz, Igor. "Sexual Morality: Is Consent Enough?". Ethical Theory and Moral Practice. September 2001, Volume 4, Issue 3, pp 201–218.

== Literature ==
- (in Croatian) Entry "Primorac, Igor" in the Croatian Encyclopedia
