= Weinstein =

Weinstein is a German or Yiddish surname meaning ”wine stone”, referring to the crystals of cream of tartar (potassium bitartrate) that precipitate out of fermenting grape juice.

== List of people with this surname ==
- Alan Weinstein, (born 1943), American mathematician
- Albert Weinstein (1885–1969), German Olympic track and field athlete
- Alexander Weinstein (1897–1979), Russian-German mathematician
- Alexander Weinstein (author), American short story writer and filmmaker
- Allen Weinstein, (1937–2015), American historian
- Andrew Weinstein, (1850–1915), British priest, chaplain, and missionary
- Arnold Weinstein, (1927–2005), American poet, playwright and librettist
- Bob Weinstein, (born 1954), American film producer
- Bobby Weinstein, (1939–2022), American songwriter and singer
- Bret Weinstein, (born 1969), American professor in biology
- Brian Weinstein, American politician
- Bruce Weinstein, American writer
- Casey Weinstein, American politician
- Claire Weinstein (born 2007), American Olympic medalist swimmer
- Cordt Weinstein, American soccer player
- Dan Weinstein (disambiguation)
- David Weinstein (disambiguation)
- Debra Weinstein, American author
- Domenic Weinstein, German professional racing cyclist
- Eric Weinstein, American mathematician and economist
- Garik Kimovich Weinstein, birth name of Russian chess player Garry Kasparov
- Halina Weinstein, Polish teacher, poet, linguist and Esperantist
- Hannah Weinstein, American activist, movie maker
- Harvey Weinstein, American film producer
- Howard Weinstein, American bridge player
- Howard Weinstein (writer), writer of Star Trek's The Pirates of Orion
- I. Bernard Weinstein, American physician
- Iram Weinstein, American engineer
- Irv Weinstein, American television news anchor
- Jack B. Weinstein, United States federal judge
- Jacob Sager Weinstein, American humorist
- James Weinstein (disambiguation)
- J. Elvis Weinstein, American writer and performer
- Jeremy S. Weinstein (born 1950), New York politician and judge
- Joshua Weinstein (disambiguation)
- Kenneth R. Weinstein, American political theorist
- Lauren Weinstein (disambiguation)
- Louis Weinstein (1908–2000), American infectious diseases physician, microbiologist, and educator
- Madeline Weinstein (born 1993), American actress
- Madge Weinstein, fictional Internet personality
- Matthew Weinstein, American artist
- Michael Weinstein (disambiguation)
- Milton Weinstein, American, Professor at Harvard School of Public Health
- Moses M. Weinstein (1912–2007), New York politician and judge
- Nathan Weinstein, better known under his pen name Nathanael West (1903–1940), American writer
- Nikolas Weinstein (born 1968), American glass artist
- Paul Weinstein (disambiguation)
- Peter Weinstein, American politician
- Raymond Weinstein (born 1941), American chess player
- Samantha Weinstein, Canadian actress
- Selma James Weinstein, American feminist and socialist
- Samuel Weinstein, later Stephen Winsten (1893–1991), British writer
- Shlomo Weinstein, changed name to Shlomo Gazit (1926–2020), Israeli head of Israeli Defense Forces military intelligence, President of Ben-Gurion University
- Sidney T. Weinstein, US lieutenant general
- Simcha Weinstein (born 1975), British writer and rabbi
- Stephanie J. Weinstein (born 1967), American nutritionist and epidemiologist
- Steve Weinstein, American bridge and poker player
- Steven Weinstein (philosopher), Canadian philosopher
- Tali Farhadian Weinstein, Iranian-born American former federal prosecutor who ran for New York County District Attorney
- Todd Jay Weinstein (born 1951), American photographer
- Toni Weinstein, American politician
- Yehuda Weinstein, attorney general of Israel
- Yehuda Weisenstein (born 1955), also known as Yehuda Weinstein, Israeli Olympic fencer

== See also ==
- Vainshtein
- Veinstein
- Weinstein conjecture
- Weinstein effect
- The Weinstein Company, film studio
