= George Steiner bibliography =

Spanish translation of Lessons of the Masters

List of works by or about George Steiner.

== Books ==
- Fantasy Poets Number Eight. Fantasy Press, Eynsham, 1952. (Seven poems.)
- Tolstoy or Dostoevsky: An Essay in Contrast, Faber and Faber, 1959
- The Death of Tragedy, Faber and Faber, 1961
- Homer: A Collection of Critical Essays, 1962
- Anno Domini: Three Stories, Faber and Faber, 1964
- The Penguin Book of Modern Verse Translation, Penguin, 1966
- Language and Silence: Essays 1958-1966, Faber and Faber, 1967
- Poem Into Poem: World Poetry in Modern Verse Translation, Penguin, 1970
- In Bluebeard's Castle: Some Notes Towards the Redefinition of Culture, Faber and Faber, 1971
- Extraterritorial: Papers on Literature and the Language Revolution, Faber and Faber, 1972
- The Sporting Scene: White Knights of Reykjavik, Faber and Faber, 1973
- Nostalgia for the Absolute, 1974
- Fields of Force: Fischer and Spassky at Reykjavik, 1974
- After Babel: Aspects of Language and Translation, Oxford University Press, 1975
- Why English?, Oxford University Press, 1975
- Contemporary Approaches to English Studies, Heinemann Education, 1977
- Has Truth a Future?, BBC, 1978—The Bronowski Memorial Lecture 1978
- Heidegger, Fontana Modern Masters, 1978
- On Difficulty and Other Essays, Oxford University Press, 1978
- The Uncommon Reader, 1978
- The Portage to San Cristobal of A.H., Faber and Faber, 1981
- Antigones, Clarendon Press, 1984
- George Steiner: A Reader, Penguin, 1984
- A Reading Against Shakespeare, University of Glasgow, 1986
- The dissent from reason : contemporary intellectual currents in the Western world, Jerusalem : B'nai B'rith World Center, 1986
- Real Presences: Is There Anything in What We Say?, Faber and Faber, 1989
- Proofs and Three Parables, Faber and Faber, 1992
- What is Comparative Literature?, Clarendon Press, 1995—an inaugural lecture before the University of Oxford, UK on October 11, 1994
- Homer in English, Penguin, 1996 (Editor)
- No Passion Spent: Essays 1978-1996, Faber and Faber, 1996
- The Deeps of the Sea, and Other Fiction, Faber and Faber, 1996
- Errata: An Examined Life, Weidenfeld and Nicolson, 1997
- Grammars of Creation, Faber and Faber, 2001
- Lessons of the Masters, Harvard University Press, 2003
- The Idea of Europe, Nexus Institute, 2004
- Nostalgia for the Absolute, House of Anansi Press, 2004
- At Five in the Afternoon, in Kenyon Review and Pushcart Prize XXVIII, 2004 (fiction)
- Le Silence des Livres, Arléa, 2006
- My Unwritten Books, New Directions, 2008
- George Steiner at The New Yorker, New Directions, 2008
- Les Logocrates, L'Herne, 2008
- A cinq heures de l'après-midi, L'Herne, 2008 (fiction)
- Ceux qui brûlent les livres, L'Herne, 2008
- The Poetry of Thought: From Hellenism to Celan, New Directions, 2011

== Articles ==
- Broch, Hermann (1984). Hugo von Hofmannsthal and His Time: The European Imagination, 1860–1920. Translated by Michael P. Steinberg. University of Chicago Press. ISBN 9780226075167.
- Simon, John (October 1989). "Made of Steiner Stuff: A review of Real Presences by George Steiner". The New Criterion.
- Steiner, George (28 January 1985). "Books: Dream City". The New Yorker. Vol. 60, no. 50. pp. 92–97.

== Critical studies and reviews of Steiner's work ==
- Lojek, Helen (Spring 1994). "Brian Friel's plays and George Steiner's linguistics : translating the Irish". Contemporary Literature. 35 (1): 83–99. doi:10.2307/1208737. JSTOR 1208737.
