= United Nations Security Council Resolution 1963 =

UN Security Council Resolution 1963
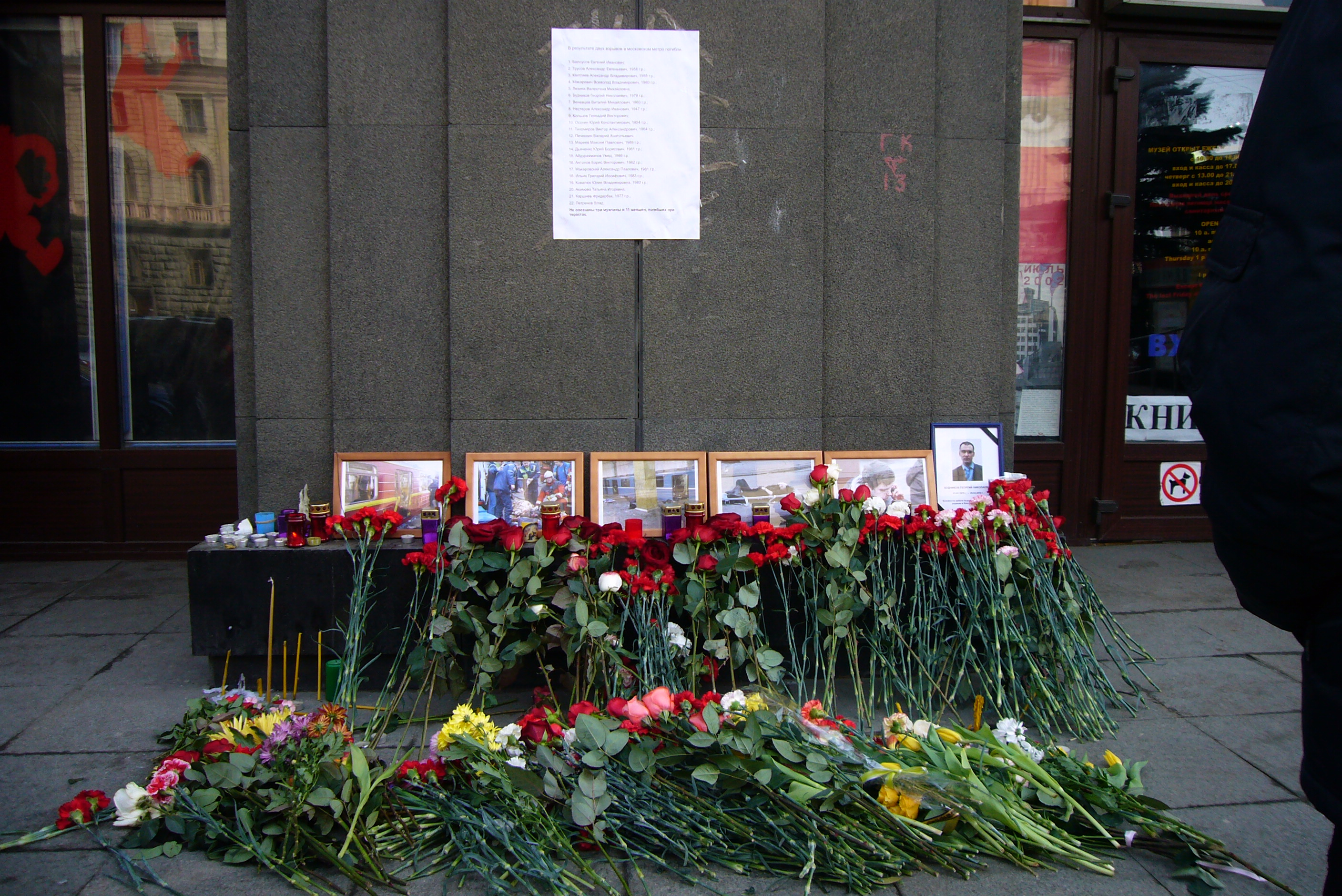
- Memorial to victims of the 2010 Moscow Metro bombings
- Date: 20 December 2010
- Meeting no.: 6,459
- Code: S/RES/1963 (Document)
- Subject: Threats to international peace and security caused by terrorist acts
- Voting summary: 15 voted for; None voted against; None abstained
- Result: Adopted

Security Council composition
- Permanent members: China; France; Russia; United Kingdom; United States
- Non-permanent members: Austria; Bosnia–Herzegovina; Brazil; Gabon; Japan; Lebanon; Mexico; Nigeria; Turkey; Uganda

United Nations Security Council Resolution 1963, adopted unanimously on December 20, 2010, after reaffirming resolutions 1373 (2001), 1535 (2004), 1624 (2004), 1787 (2007) and 1805 (2008), the Council decided to continue the Counter-Terrorism Committee Executive Directorate (CTED) under the guidance of the Counter-Terrorism Committee (CTC) for another three years until December 31, 2013.

== Resolution ==
=== Observations ===
The Security Council reaffirmed that terrorism was one of the greatest threats to international peace and security and that it could not be associated with any religion, nationality or ethnic group. It acknowledged that military and intelligence operations alone could not defeat terrorism, and that underlying causes should be addressed. There was also concern over the increasing number of abductions and kidnappings by terrorist groups with a political motive.

Member States were reminded of their obligation to prevent and suppress terrorism and the criminalise its financing. They also had to have effective border controls and information exchanges regarding the movement of terrorists; the presence of safe havens for terrorists was also a problem. The council also emphasised its role in the fight against terrorism.

=== Acts ===
The Council emphasised that the role of the CTC was to ensure the full implementation of Resolution 1373. It extended the Executive Directorate of the Counter-Terrorism Committee as a special political mission until December 31, 2013. Member States were called upon to continue to provide technical support and help develop strategies in the fight against terrorism. The Executive Directorate was also instructed to report on the implementation of resolutions 1373 and 1624, respectively on June 30 and December 31, 2011.

The resolution also highlighted that counter-terrorism and respect for human rights were complementary.

== See also ==
- Anti-terrorism legislation
- Counter-terrorism
- List of terrorist incidents
- List of United Nations Security Council Resolutions 1901 to 2000 (2009–2011)
- Terrorist financing
