= Incitement to terrorism =

Category in some national legal systems

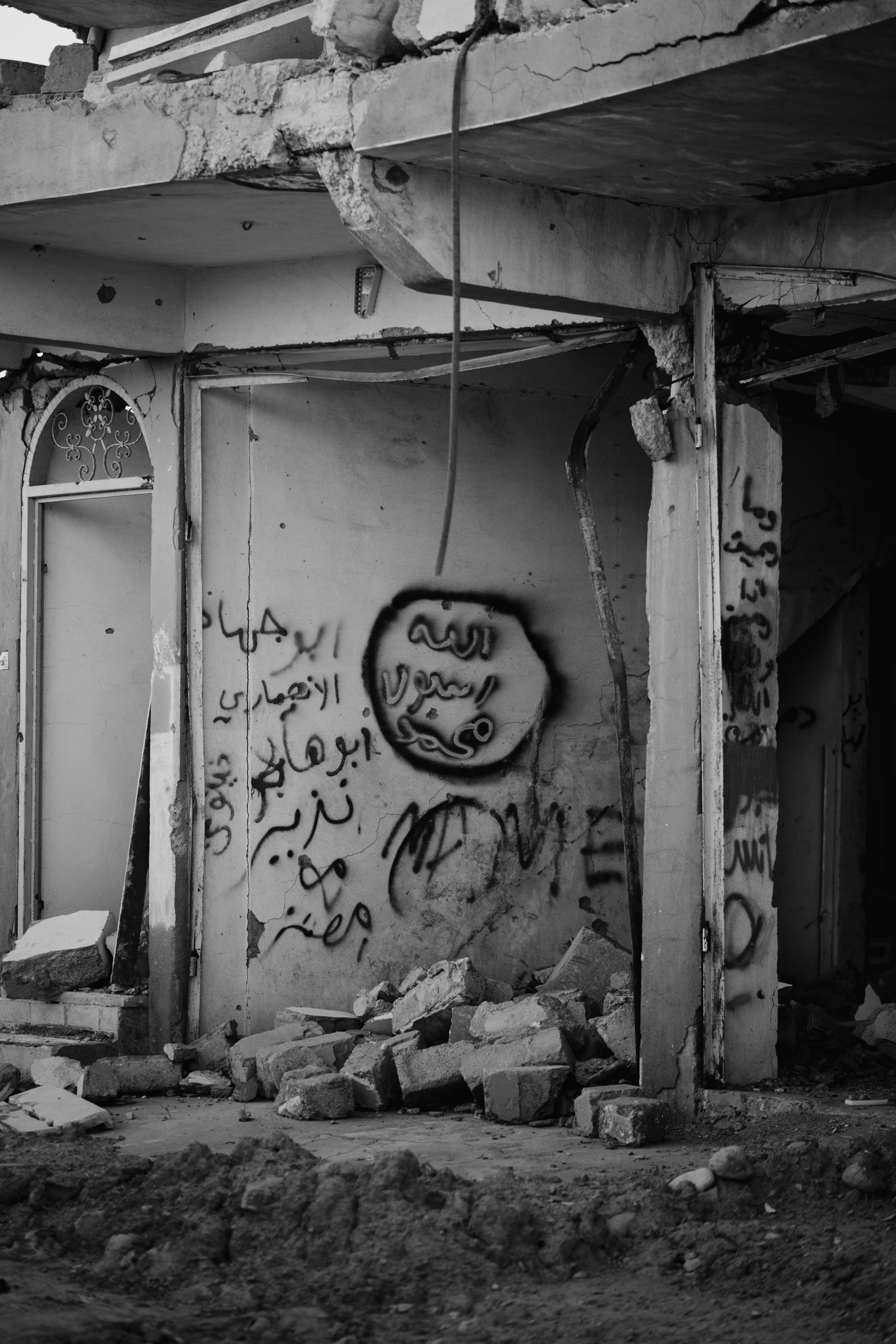
Pro-Islamic State graffiti in the ruins of Sinjar in July 2019

Incitement to terrorism is a category in some national legal systems which may criminalize direct encouragement of acts of violence or praise for proscribed terrorist organizations. It was also prohibited by United Nations Security Council Resolution 1624 in 2005.

== Overview ==
Legal scholars Daphne Barak-Erez and David Scharia have identified a difference in approach between European and United States laws criminalizing incitement to terrorism; the former tend to focus on the content of the speech and whether it supports terrorist violence, while the latter focuses on whether the speaker is linked to proscribed organizations. The European approach involves explicit limits on freedom of speech, while the United States approach is more indirect.

Incitement is an inchoate offense and is punishable even if no causal connection with a terror attack is proven. Merely establishing terrorism as a potential result of the speech is sufficient.

One major motivation for criminalizing incitement to terrorism is its potential usefulness as an upstream prevention for deadly terror attacks. Some experts even argue that incitement is a sine qua non for terrorist attacks.

== International law ==
United Nations Security Council Resolution 1624, unanimously adopted in 2005, is the first international legal instrument which deals with incitement to terrorism. It was prompted by the 2005 London bombings. United Nations Security Council Resolution 1963 authorizes the Counter-Terrorism Committee of the Security Council to monitor the passage of laws criminalizing incitement to terrorism in member states.

=== European law ===
The Council of Europe adopted the Convention on the Prevention of Terrorism, also in 2005, which requires member countries to pass legislation to criminalize the "public provocation to commit a terrorist offence". This does not cover apologia for terrorism. Although the European Convention on Human Rights protects freedom of expression, incitement is not protected. In Zana v. Turkey, the European Court of Human Rights ruled that Mehdi Zana's free speech rights were not violated when he was punished by Turkey for calling PKK, a proscribed terrorist organization, a "national liberation movement". In Leroy v. France, cartoonist Denis Leroy's conviction and fine for glorifying the September 11 attacks under French law was upheld by the ECHR.

== By country ==
=== France ===
Article 24 of the Press Law of 1881 criminalizes the incitement and advocacy of terrorism, as well as apologia for terrorism. As of 2011, the penalty was up to five years imprisonment and/or a fine up to 45,000 euros.

=== Israel ===
Barak-Erez and Scharia identify Israel as belonging to the European tradition, in part because of its legal system's origins in British law.

The Prevention of Terrorism Ordinance, enacted in 1948, remains in force, and was for many years the primary provision criminalizing incitement to terrorism. This ordinance empowers the government to designate terrorist organizations and criminalizes being a member of or supporting such a group. Section 4 of the ordinance states that:

A person who – (a) publishes, in writing or orally, words of praise, sympathy or encouragement for acts of violence calculated to cause death or injury to a person or for threats of such acts of violence; or (b) publishes, in writing or orally, words of praise or sympathy for or an appeal for aid or support of a terrorist organization . . . (g) commits an act that expresses identification with a terrorist organization or sympathy to it, by waving a flag, displaying a symbol or a slogan or reciting a hymn or a slogan or any similar overt act which clearly discloses identification or sympathy in a public place or in a manner that people who are present in public place can see or hear such an expression of identification or sympathy; shall be guilty of an offense and shall be liable on conviction to imprisonment for a term not exceeding three years or to a fine not exceeding one thousand pounds or to both such penalties.

In Jabareen v. State of Israel, the Supreme Court of Israel found that the Prevention of Terrorism Ordinance applied only to designated terrorist organizations rather than the promotion of acts of violence more generally. Following this case, the Knesset replaced Section 4 with a new section, 144D2, which extends the prohibition to incitement of terrorist actions not connected to terrorist organizations.

=== Spain ===
Article 18.1 of the Spanish Penal Code criminalizes provocation to commit any criminal offense and by extension apologia for criminal offenses. Organic Law No. 7/2000 explicitly prohibits, with a penalty of one to two years' imprisonment:

...glorification or justification, through any form of public information or communication, of the offenses referred to in articles 571 to 577 (Note: Articles 171 to 177 of the Spanish Penal Code belong to Chapter VII: On terrorist organisations and groups and on criminal offences of terrorism.) refer to belonging hereof or of persons having participated in their perpetration, or the commission of acts tending to discredit, demean or humiliate the victims of terrorist offenses or their families...

=== United Kingdom ===
The Terrorism Act 2006 created the offence of encouragement to terrorism, which prohibits "a statement that is likely to be understood by some or all of the members of the public to whom it is published as a direct or indirect encouragement or other inducement to them to the commission, preparation or instigation of acts of terrorism or Convention offences." Indirect encouragement statements include "every statement which glorifies the commission or preparation (whether in the past, in the future or generally) of such acts or offences". However, they are only criminalized if the speaker intends to cause others to commit terrorist offences.

=== United States ===
Because of the First Amendment, incitement to terrorism or other forms of crime and unlawful violence is constitutionally protected free speech, unless it can be proven that the speech is "directed to inciting or producing imminent lawless action" and "is likely to incite or produce such action". However, in 2010 Holder v. Humanitarian Law Project, the Supreme Court ruled that "a criminal prohibition on advocacy carried out in coordination with, or at the direction of, a foreign terrorist organization is constitutionally permissible". This is because such statements constitute material support for terrorism. Some defendants, including Javed Iqbal, who helped the Hezbollah TV station Al-Manar to broadcast, have been convicted of providing material support for terrorism under United States law.

== Conflict with free speech ==
Incitement to terrorism offenses are considered by some to be an unjustified infringement of free speech rights, and it is argued that general encouragement of terrorism may be a political statement rather than literal encouragement to commit terrorist offenses. However, some advocates of criminalization, such as Yaël Ronen, believe that it is possible and desirable to criminalize a definition of incitement to terrorism which does not excessively infringe freedom of speech.

== See also ==
- Counterterrorism
- Incitement to ethnic or racial hatred
- Incitement to genocide
- Stochastic terrorism
- Terroristic threat
- Volksverhetzung

== Sources ==
- Barak-Erez, Daphne; Scharia, David (2011). "Freedom of Speech, Support for Terrorism, and the Challenge of Global Constitutional Law" (PDF). Harvard National Security Journal. 2. Archived from the original (PDF) on 2020-02-06.
- Barendt, Eric (2011). "Incitement to, and Glorification of, Terrorism". In Hare, Ivan; Weinstein, James (eds.). Extreme Speech and Democracy. Oxford University Press. doi:10.1093/acprof:oso/9780199548781.001.0001. ISBN 978-0-19-172067-3.
- Ronen, Yaël (2010). "Incitement to Terrorist Acts and International Law". Leiden Journal of International Law. 23 (3): 645–674. doi:10.1017/S0922156510000269. S2CID 145722808.
- van Ginkel, Bibi (2011). "Incitement to Terrorism: A Matter of Prevention or Repression?". Terrorism and Counter-Terrorism Studies. International Centre for Counter-Terrorism. doi:10.19165/2011.1.06.
- Weinstein, James (2011). "An Overview of American Free Speech Doctrine". In Hare, Ivan; Weinstein, James (eds.). Extreme Speech and Democracy. Oxford University Press. ISBN 978-0-19-172067-3.
