= Vainshtein =

Vainshtein (originally an Eastern European spelling variant of Weinstein) is a German and Yiddish surname. Notable people with the surname include:

- Gil Vainshtein (born 1984), Canadian soccer player
- Lev Vainshtein (1916–2004), Soviet sport shooter
- Samuil Vainshtein (1894–1942), Russian chess player
- Sevyan Vainshtein (1926–2008), Russian anthropologist and historian
- Arkady Vainshtein (born 1942), Russian-American theoretical physicist
- Leonid Vainshtein (1945–1994), Azerbaijani-Jew composer
- Boris Vainshtein (1921–1996), Russian crystallographer

== See also ==
- Veinstein
- Weinstein
