= Wainstein =

Wainstein is a surname. Notable people with the surname include:

- Jules Wainstein, reality television personality on The Real Housewives of New York City
- Kenneth L. Wainstein (born 1962), American lawyer
- Leo Wainstein (1883–1978), Ukrainian-born Italian jurist and businessman

== See also ==
- Weinstein
