= David Kessler (French official) =

French official (1959–2020)

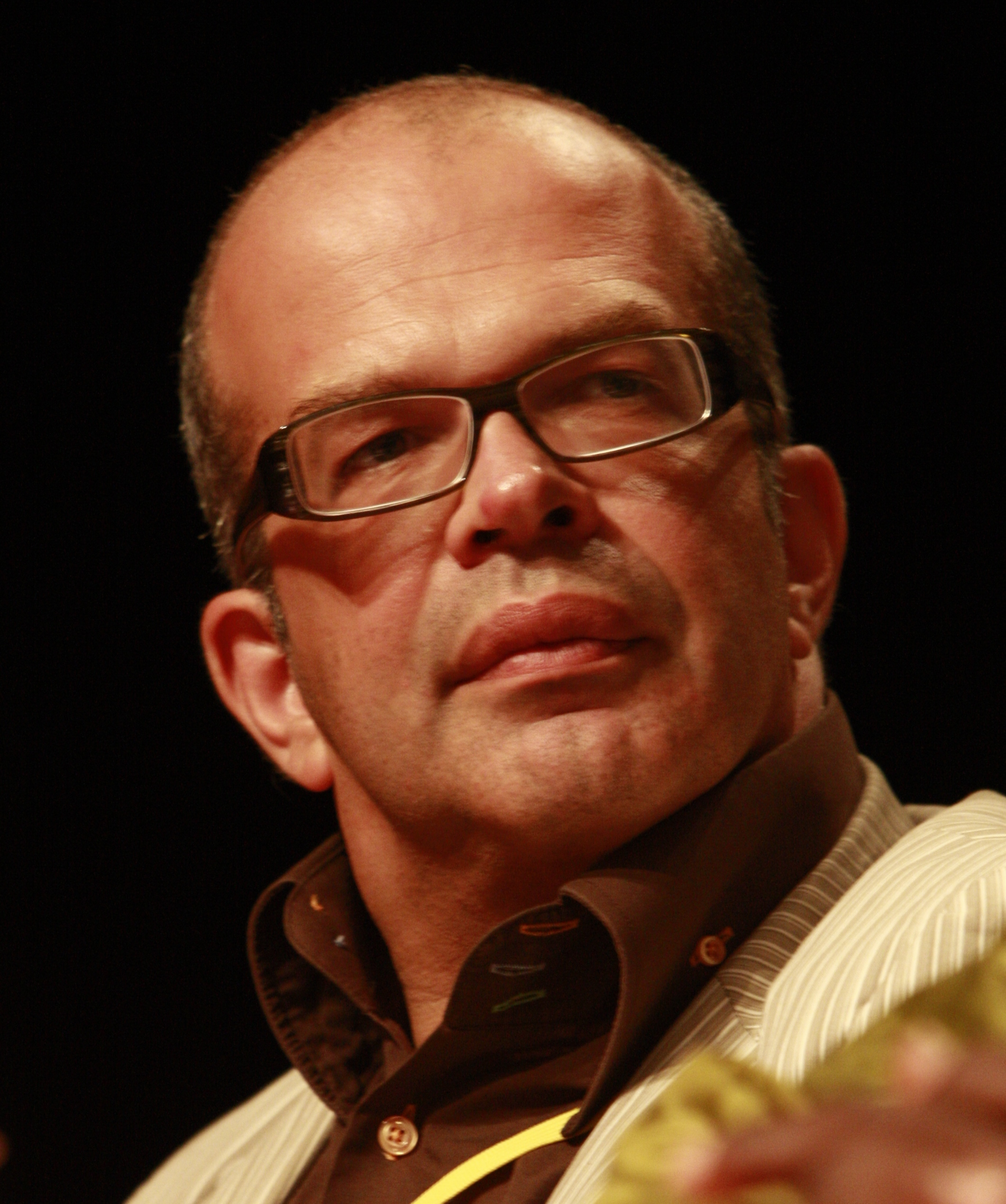
- David Kessler

Director General of Centre national du cinéma et de l'image animée
- In office 2001–2004
- Succeeded by: Catherine Colonna

Director of France Culture
- In office 2005–2008
- Preceded by: Laure Adler
- Succeeded by: Bruno Patino

Personal details
- Born: 24 February 1959 Boulogne-Billancourt, France
- Died: 3 February 2020 (aged 60) Paris, France
- Spouse(s): Sophie Mesguich; Cyril Pigot
- Relatives: Emmanuel Kessler (brother)
- Education: École normale supérieure de Saint-Cloud

David Kessler (24 February 1959 – 3 February 2020) was a French senior official. He served as Culture and Communication Adviser to the President of France from 2012 to 2014, and also served on numerous boards of directors.

== Biography ==
David was the son of Paul Kessler, former director of research at the French National Centre for Scientific Research, and Colette Kessler, who co-founded the Liberal Jewish Movement of France. He was also the brother of Emmanuel Kessler, a journalist.

Kessler began studying at the École normale supérieure de Saint-Cloud in 1977. He earned his Agrégation in philosophy in 1980, and later a master's degree in philosophy with a concentration on Baruch Spinoza. He was admitted into the École nationale d'administration (ENA), and upon graduating was assigned to the Conseil d'État. Kessler gave lectures at Sciences Po from 1989 to 1991, and at the ENA from 1991 to 1998.

From 1996 to 1997, Kessler served as the Director General of the Conseil supérieur de l'audiovisuel (CSA). He then served as director for culture and communication to Prime Minister Lionel Jospin. He participated in the Young Leaders Program organized by the French-American Foundation in 1999. After this, Kessler served as an executive for numerous French corporations. From 2001 to 2004, Kessler was the Director General of the Centre national du cinéma et de l'image animée (CNC). From 2005 to 2008, he was Director of France Culture. He was President of the Conseil supérieur des musiques actuelles from 2006 to 2009. He was Deputy Director of Radio France in charge of content strategy from 2008 to 2009.

Kessler directed the magazine Les Inrockuptibles, as well as the French language version of the Huffington Post from 2011 to 2012. He worked to help RMC Story, then called Numéro 23, rise to prominence with promotion of racial and sexual diversity. He supported the Isota Association, which promoted marriage and adoption for homosexual couples.

Kessler was the adviser of radio and music to François Hollande from 2012 to 2014. He moved to the private sector after that, directing the cinema sector of Orange.

After the death of his wife, Sophie Mesguich, he was remarried to Cyril Pigot in 2013. Kessler died on 3 February 2020 at the age of 60.

== Awards ==
- Knight of the Ordre national du Mérite
- Knight of the Ordre des Palmes académiques
- Commander of the Ordre des Arts et des Lettres
