= United Nations Security Council Resolution 1625 =

UN Security Council Resolution 1625
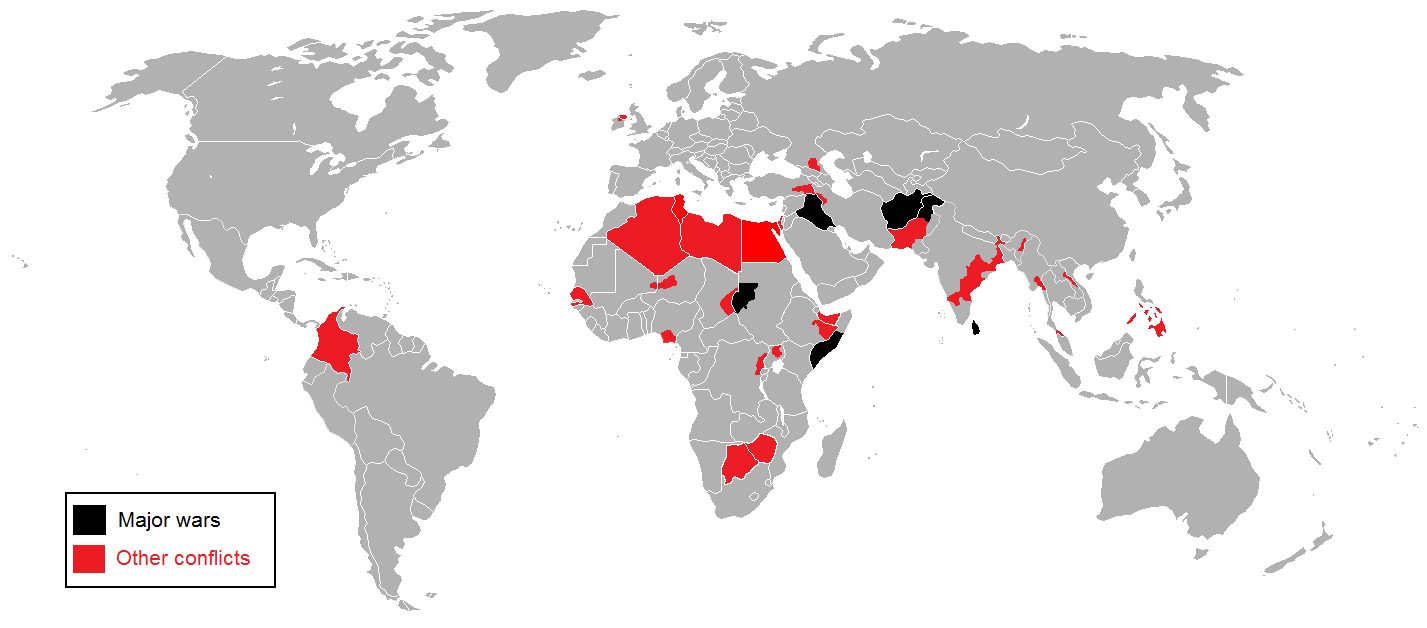
- Conflicts in the world
- Date: 14 September 2005
- Meeting no.: 5,261
- Code: S/RES/1625 (Document)
- Subject: Threats to international peace and security (Security Council Summit 2005)
- Voting summary: 15 voted for; None voted against; None abstained
- Result: Adopted

Security Council composition
- Permanent members: China; France; Russia; United Kingdom; United States
- Non-permanent members: Algeria; Argentina; Benin; Brazil; Denmark; Greece; Japan; Philippines; Romania; Tanzania

United Nations Security Council resolution 1625, adopted unanimously at the 2005 World Summit on 14 September 2005, the Council adopted a declaration on the role of the Security Council in conflict prevention, particularly in Africa where many armed conflicts were taking place.

Resolution 1625, along with Resolution 1624 (2005), was adopted at a meeting of heads of state or government.

== Declaration ==
=== Observations ===
The Security Council expressed "deep concern" at the human cost and material loses caused by armed conflict. It reaffirmed the importance of refraining from the threat or use of force in international relations, the need to adopt a conflict prevention strategy to address the root causes of conflict and crises, and to strengthen the role of the United Nations in preventing violent conflict and build partnerships between international and regional organisations.

The preamble of the declaration made reference to the African Union in particular, and its position on the unconstitutional changes of government on the continent. It also recognised the role of civil society in conflict prevention.

=== Acts ===
The resolution expressed the council's determination to enhance the effectiveness of the United Nations in preventing armed conflict, by:

(a) assessing developments in regions at risk of armed conflict and ask the Secretary-General to provide information;
(b) follow-up the preventative-diplomacy initiatives of the Secretary-General;
(c) supporting regional mediation initiatives;
(d) supporting capacities for early warning;
(e) requesting assistance from the United Nations Economic and Social Council;
(f) taking measures to tackle illicit arms trafficking and the use of mercenaries;
(g) enhancing institutions conducive to peace, stability and sustainable development;
(h) supporting African states to build independent judicial institutions.

Meanwhile, the secretary-general was required to provide information on potential armed conflicts to the council, particularly from Africa, assist countries at risk of conflict and promote regional conflict management initiatives.

The council stressed the importance of conflict prevention strategies to avoid a negative impact on security, economic, social, political and humanitarian sectors in countries facing crisis. A regional approach was also highlighted, particularly with regard to demobilisation, demilitarisation and reintegration, and action would be taken against the illegal exploitation of natural resources which fuelled conflict. Increased co-operation between the United Nations and regional or subregional organisations was also called for, in accordance with Chapter VIII of the United Nations Charter.

The latter half of the resolution addressed African nations. The council encouraged African states to African Union Non-Aggression and Common Defence Pact of 31 January 2005 and to work with the United Nations Secretariat and regional offices to implement measures for establishing peace, security, stability, democracy and sustainable development. Meanwhile, the international community was called upon to support African nations in the aforementioned objectives, and to develop the capacities of African regional and subregional organisations to deploy civilian and military assets when needed.

== See also ==
- Conflict resolution
- List of ongoing military conflicts
- List of United Nations Security Council Resolutions 1601 to 1700 (2005–2006)
