= United Nations Security Council Resolution 1624 =

UN Security Council Resolution 1624
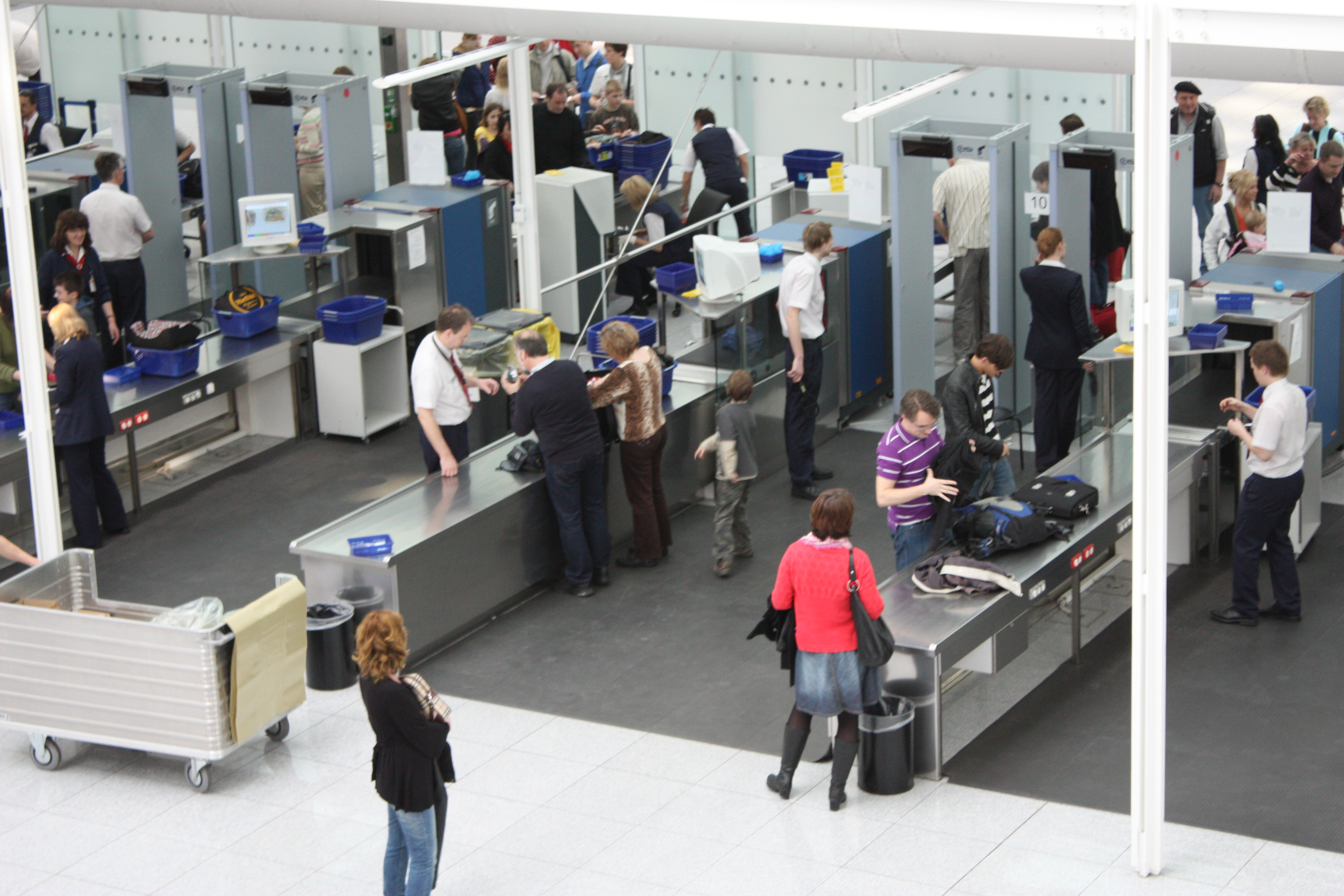
- Airport security
- Date: 14 September 2005
- Meeting no.: 5,261
- Code: S/RES/1624 (Document)
- Subject: Threats to international peace and security (Security Council Summit 2005)
- Voting summary: 15 voted for; None voted against; None abstained
- Result: Adopted

Security Council composition
- Permanent members: China; France; Russia; United Kingdom; United States
- Non-permanent members: Algeria; Argentina; Benin; Brazil; Denmark; Greece; Japan; Philippines; Romania; Tanzania

United Nations Security Council resolution 1624, adopted unanimously at the 2005 World Summit on 14 September 2005, after reaffirming previous resolutions on terrorism, including resolutions 1267 (1999), 1373 (2001), 1535 (2004), 1540 (2004), 1566 (2004) and 1617 (2005), the Council called on all states to co-operate in order to strengthen the security of their international borders by enhancing terrorist screening and passenger security procedures.

Resolution 1624, along with Resolution 1625 (2005), was adopted at a meeting of heads of state or government. The resolution was drafted by the United Kingdom.

== Resolution ==
=== Observations ===
In the preamble of the resolution, the Council reaffirmed its intention to combat terrorism in all its forms in accordance with the United Nations Charter, while stressing that measures taken should conform to international law. It condemned acts of terrorism and the incitement and glorification of terrorist acts, expressing concern that such actions pose a threat to human rights and the peace, stability and economic development of all states. Furthermore, the Council recalled the Universal Declaration of Human Rights and provisions relating to freedom of expression and the right to asylum.

The Security Council continued by expressing concern at the increasing number of victims of terrorism, the nature of terrorism as contrary to the United Nations Charter and the role of the United Nations in combatting terrorism. It called on all countries to become party to international conventions regarding counterterrorism and the International Convention for the Suppression of Acts of Nuclear Terrorism.

Meanwhile, the resolution emphasised efforts for dialogue to broaden understanding among civilisations to prevent any indiscriminate targeting of religions and cultures. In this regard, the role of media, business and society was important to promote tolerance. The Council recognised that in a globalised world, states act co-operatively to prevent terrorists from using sophisticated communication to incite terrorist acts.

=== Acts ===
The Security Council called upon all states to adopt measures necessary to prohibit incitement to terrorist action and deny safe haven to persons where there is credible evidence that they had been involved in such conduct. Furthermore, countries were asked to strengthen their international borders through combatting fraudulent travel documents, enhance terrorist screening and passenger security procedures, and improve understanding among civilisations. It was stressed that measures taken had to comply with international law and report to the Counter-Terrorism Committee.

Finally, the Counter-Terrorism Committee was instructed to engage in dialogue with states on how they implemented the current resolution, promoting the best legal practice and information exchange, and to report back within twelve months.

== See also ==
- Anti-terrorism legislation
- List of terrorist incidents
- List of United Nations Security Council Resolutions 1601 to 1700 (2005–2006)
