= James Weinstein =

James Weinstein may refer to:

- James Weinstein (author) (1926–2005), journalist
- James Weinstein (New Jersey official), transportation executive
- James N. Weinstein, American health executive
- James Weinstein (legal scholar), American legal scholar
