= The Portage to San Cristobal of A.H. =

1981 novella by George Steiner

- First edition cover
- Author: George Steiner
- Language: English
- Genres: Literary novella, philosophical fiction
- Publisher: Faber and Faber (UK); Simon & Schuster (US)
- Publication date: May 1981 (UK); April 1982 (US)
- Publication place: United Kingdom
- Media type: Print (paperback original)
- Pages: 128 (first edition)
- ISBN: 0-571-11741-4
- OCLC: 7756644
- LC Class: PR6069.T417 P6x 1982

The Portage to San Cristobal of A.H. is a 1981 literary and philosophical novella by George Steiner. The story is about Jewish Nazi hunters who find a fictional Adolf Hitler (A.H.) alive in the Amazon jungle thirty years after the end of World War II. The book was controversial, particularly among reviewers and Jewish scholars, because the author allows Hitler to defend himself when he is put on trial in the jungle by his captors. There Hitler maintains that Israel owes its existence to the Holocaust and that he is the "benefactor of the Jews".

The novella was first published in a literary magazine, The Kenyon Review in 1979. After some minor revisions by Steiner, it was published in the United Kingdom in May 1981 as a paperback original by Faber and Faber, and in the United States in hardcover in April 1982 by Simon & Schuster. Adapted for the theatre by British playwright Christopher Hampton, it was staged in London in 1982 and in Hartford, Connecticut a year later. The productions generated further controversy, resulting in public pickets and condemnation being levelled against Steiner.

A central theme of The Portage is the nature of language, and revolves around Steiner's lifelong work on the subject and his fascination in the power and terror of human speech. Other themes include the philosophical and moral analysis of history, justice, guilt and revenge. Steiner makes no attempt to explain Hitler, but rather enters into a dialogue with him.

Reaction to the book was mixed: in a review in Time magazine, Otto Friedrich described it as "a philosophic fantasy of remarkable intensity", whereas John Leonard of The New York Times called Hitler's speech at the end of the book "obscene", and said Steiner's decision to leave it unchallenged "makes me sick to my stomach." Similarly, many readers and theatre-goers were disturbed by Steiner's fictional Hitler, and the author admitted that his character had got the better of him. Despite the controversy, The Portage to San Cristobal of A.H. was a 1983 finalist in the PEN/Faulkner Award for Fiction.

== Plot ==
From his base in Tel Aviv, Holocaust survivor Emmanuel Lieber directs a group of Jewish Nazi hunters in search of Adolf Hitler. Lieber believes that the former Führer is still alive, and following rumours and hearsay, he tracks Hitler's movements through South America. After months of wading through swamps in the Amazon jungle, the search party finds the 90-year-old alive in a clearing. Lieber flies to San Cristóbal where he awaits the group's return with their captive. But getting the old man out of the jungle alive is more difficult than getting in, and their progress is further hampered by heavy thunderstorms.

Meanwhile, broken and incoherent radio messages between Lieber and the search party are intercepted by intelligence agents tracking their progress, and rumours begin to spread across the world of Hitler's capture. Debates flare up over his impending trial, where it will be held and under whose jurisdiction. Orosso is identified as the nearest airfield to the last known location of the search party, and aircraft begin arriving at the hitherto unknown town. But when the search party loses radio contact with Lieber, they must make a decision to either wait out the storms and deliver their captive to Lieber later, or try Hitler in the jungle. They choose the latter, given that they would likely lose control of the situation if they attempted to transport their prisoner. Against Lieber's advice ("You must not let him speak ... his tongue is like no other") they prepare for a trial with a judge, prosecution and defence attorneys selected from the members of the search party. Teku, a local Indian tracker, is asked to observe the trial as an independent witness.

The attention Hitler receives renews his strength, and when the trial begins, he brushes aside his "defence attorney" and begins a long speech in four parts in his own defence:

1. First, Hitler claims he took his doctrines from the Jews and copied the notion of the master race from the Chosen people and their need to separate themselves from the "unclean". "My racism is a parody of yours, a hungry imitation."
2. Next, Hitler justifies the Final Solution by maintaining that the Jews' God, purer than any other, enslaves His subjects, continually demanding more than they can give and "blackmailing" them with ideals that cannot be attained. The "virus of utopia" had to be stopped.
3. Hitler then states that he was not the originator of evil. "[Stalin] had perfected genocide" (Soviet famine of 1932–33) "when I was still a nameless scribbler in Munich." Further, Hitler asserts that the number of lives lost due to his actions are dwarfed by various world atrocities, including those in Russia, China and Africa.
4. Finally, Hitler maintains that the Reich begat Israel and suggests that he is the Messiah "whose infamous deeds were allowed by God in order to bring His people home." He closes by asking, "Should you not honour me who have made ... Zion a reality?"

At the end of his speech, Teku, who "had not understood the words, only their meaning", is the first to react and jumps up shouting "Proven". But he is drowned out by the appearance of a helicopter over the clearing.

== Main characters ==
- Emmanuel Lieber – Jewish Holocaust survivor and director of the search party to find Hitler; after crawling out of a death pit in Bialka he never took the time to mend and embarked on a life-consuming obsession to bring those responsible for the genocide to justice.
- Search party (all Jewish with family ties to the Holocaust, except for John Asher)
  - Simeon – search party leader and "presiding judge" at Hitler's trial; he is Lieber's confidant and torn between leading the party into "unmapped quicksand and green bogs" and turning his back on the "quiet mania of Lieber's conviction".
  - Gideon Benasseraf – falls ill and dies before the trial begins; during one of his fever-induced ramblings he suggests that Hitler is Jewish; he had sought out Lieber after being released from a sanatorium and spending three years recuperating in Paris where the care-free living consumed him with guilt.
  - Elie Barach – Orthodox Jew and "prosecution attorney" at the trial; he is the moral compass of the group, but his convictions are disturbed by Gideon Benasseraf's fever-induced assertions that Hitler is Jewish and ends up believing that Hitler may be the second Messiah.
  - Isaac Amsel – an 18-year-old boy and witness at the trial; he is the son of Isaac Amsel senior, former member of the search party killed earlier in a skirmish in São Paulo; he joined the party to avenge his father's death.
  - John Asher – half-Jewish and reluctant "defence attorney" at the trial; fascinated by the capture of Martin Bormann and the rumours circulating that Hitler may be alive, he had approached Nazi hunter Simon Wiesenthal who directed him to Lieber; despite being an "outsider" (no ties to the Holocaust) Lieber assigned him to the search party because of his military training and his clear-headedness ("no metaphysical lusts, no cravings for retribution").
- Teku – local Indian tracker and independent witness at the trial; previously the search party's guide who had abandoned them when they insisted on entering uncharted regions of the jungle, he continued tracking them from a distance before revealing himself.
- Adolf Hitler – now 90 years old, the former leader of the Third Reich had not died in the Führerbunker in Berlin, but escaped to South America and hid in the Amazon jungle.

== Background and publication ==
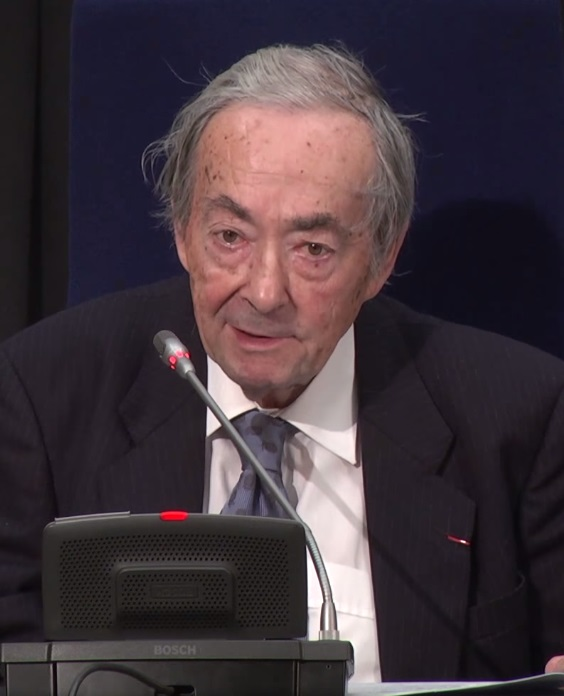
George Steiner speaking at The Nexus Institute, the Netherlands, 2013

George Steiner, academic, philosopher, writer and literary critic for The New Yorker and The New York Times, had written about the Holocaust in some of his previous books, including Anno Domini (1964), Language and Silence (1967) and In Bluebeard's Castle (1971). Many of the ideas Steiner expresses in The Portage to San Cristobal of A.H. were drawn from these earlier works. Steiner told New York Times editor D. J. R. Bruckner that this book arose out of his lifelong work on language. "Central to everything I am and believe and have written is my astonishment ... that you can use human speech both to bless, to love, to build, to forgive and also to torture, to hate, to destroy and to annihilate."

Steiner wrote The Portage in 1975 and 1976 in Geneva, Switzerland, and the 120-page work originally appeared in the Spring 1979 issue of the US literary magazine, The Kenyon Review. An abridged version was published in the Spring 1980 issue of Granta, the British literary magazine. Its first publication in book form, with minor revisions by Steiner, was in May 1981 by Faber and Faber in the UK and, as requested by Steiner, it was a paperback original. (Note: The Faber and Faber edition of the book does not credit Steiner as the author on the cover, title page or spine. The only place his name appears is at the end of the novella text and on the copyright page.) The first US edition was published in hardcover in April 1982 by Simon & Schuster. The Portage has been translated into several languages, including French, Hebrew, Italian and Swedish. But a translation into German was never published by his German publishing house Suhrkamp Verlag. The publisher Siegfried Unseld and the Non-Jewish prominent in-house authors Uwe Johnson, Max Frisch, Hans Magnus Enzensberger debated whether Steiner's The Portage would fit into Suhrkamp's cultural ethos. Steiner ironically resigned himself to his fate that the ″High Lords″ Johnson, Frisch, and Enzensberger would ″pass judgment from Mount Zion″. This reversal of roles was a latent threat of scandal, which Steiner did not make a reality. He remained silent about his failure with Unseld and even allowed the legend to spread in the Frankfurter Allgemeine Zeitung on his 60th birthday in 1989 that he had ″not yet agreed″ to a German translation of the novel for political reasons and, above all, out of mistrust of the language. Steiner was an avowedly anti-Zionist Jew. Steiner believed that Judaism was intrinsically exilic and text based, and Zionism was a form of heresy in the mould of Sabbateanism. He espoused a kind of orthodox anti-Zionism without being Orthodox Jew. His classic essay on this subject is: Our Homeland the Text.

Commenting on the controversy the book generated, Steiner admitted to literary journalist and critic Ron Rosenbaum (author of Explaining Hitler) that he too was disturbed by it, adding that his fictional Hitler had got the better of him, "golem- or Frankenstein-like". He said that it felt like the book "wrote me". Steiner also pointed out that the novella is not only about his thoughts on the Holocaust, but also about the horrific events that took place in countries like Cambodia, Vietnam, El Salvador and Burundi: "My feeling is that one has to grapple with the abyss if one can." In his 1997 memoir, Errata: An Examined Life, Steiner remarked that had he known what the response to The Portage and its stage interpretation would be, he would have made the novella "my foremost business".

== Stage adaptations ==
The only work of fiction by Steiner to have been adapted for the stage, The Portage was reworked in 1982 by British playwright Christopher Hampton. It was staged in April 1982 at London's Mermaid Theatre under the direction of John Dexter with Alec McCowen playing the part of Adolf Hitler. McCowen won the 1982 Evening Standard Theatre Award for best actor for this performance. The production generated "a storm of controversy". In "Stage Nazis: The Politics and Aesthetics of Memory", Robert Skloot described the play as "a rarely articulated fantasy about the causes of genocide" that "test[s] the limits of personal tolerance". He wrote that Steiner was "intentionally provocative" in choosing Hitler for the search party to pursue, and Hampton exploited this by giving the former Führer 25 minutes to present his case. Skloot added that while Hitler's speech is "a hodgepodge of misinformation, mendacity and slander", its delivery is captivating.

In 1983 the production moved to the US where it played at the Hartford Stage Company in Hartford, Connecticut, directed by Mark Lamos and starring John Cullum as Hitler. At this premiere, Cullum's 25-minute speech at the end of the play was described by Mel Gussow in The New York Times as "a Wagnerian intensity without resorting to histrionics" that "almost succeeds in that most difficult of tasks—humanizing Hitler". In World Literature Today, Bettina L. Knapp wrote that the play presented theatre-goers with the dilemma: what would you do with Hitler were he to surface today? Skloot noted that while the "facts" in Steiner's work are pure fiction, the play confronts the audience with an event that cannot be resolved with traditional "logic, facticity and morality". Responding to theatre critics who objected to Hitler having the last word, Steiner said he wanted the audience to refute the former dictator's claims themselves.

== Controversy ==
The Portage generated considerable controversy because of its apparent "admiration for Hitler". The controversy grew further when the stage adaptation of the book ("too faithful", according to Steiner) was performed in the UK and the US.

[T]here shall come a man [who] ... will know the grammar of hell and teach it to others. He will know the sounds of madness and loathing and make them seem music ... His tongue is like no other. It is the tongue of the basilisk, a hundred-forked and quick as flame. He created on the night-side of language a speech for hell.

— Emmanuel Lieber on Hitler, The Portage to San Cristobal of A.H., page 33

Hitler's speech at the end of the book disturbed many readers and critics. Steiner not only lets Hitler justify his past, he allows him the (almost) last word before the outside world invades. The fact that Steiner was Jewish made this speech in particular even more contentious. One critic, while acknowledging that Steiner always saw Hitler as "the incarnation of unprecedented and unparalleled evil", felt that there was no clear distinction in the book between Steiner's own views and those of his fictional Hitler, even going so far as to accuse Steiner, who rejected Jewish nationalism and was a critic of Israel's treatment of the Palestinians, of anti-Semitism.

In contrast, a Time magazine article felt that Steiner's intention for the Hitler speech was to use it to explore his belief "that Hitler wielded language as an almost supernatural force". Steiner articulated this in Lieber's warning in the book that "there shall come a man [who] ... will know the grammar of hell and ... will know the sounds of madness and loathing and make them seem music." Menachem Z. Rosensaft, chairman of the International Network of Children of Jewish Survivors, said that "Nothing in [The Portage] was a trivialization of the Holocaust or a whitewash".

Rosenbaum remarked that as Hitler's trial in the book ended, so Steiner's trial began, with "manifold and stinging" accusations levelled against him, "from the artistic to the personal". The dramatisation of the novel and the subsequent stage performances escalated the criticism, and led to public pickets. By letting Hitler's "long, insidious, subversive, and disturbing speech" go unchallenged, Steiner was accused of "playing with fire". One of Steiner's most prominent critics, British Jewish scholar Hyam Maccoby said:

In a world historically receptive to any anti-Semitic argument, however crude, to put in Hitler's mouth a powerful rationale for blaming the Jews, however ironically, was feeding the same fires that sent Jews up the chimneys of the death camps.

One of the biggest criticisms Steiner received was that he himself believed what his fictive Hitler said about the Jews. It was also thought that at the end of the London theatre production, the audience were applauding Hitler and not the play.

Steiner responded to criticism that Hitler's speech in the book is unchallenged by saying that it had been done before: for example Satan's speech in Milton's Paradise Lost (1667), and The Grand Inquisitor's speech in Dostoyevsky's The Brothers Karamazov (1880). He also reminded the reader that Hitler's speech is balanced out earlier in the book by Lieber's long monologue on the horrors of the Holocaust. Finally, Steiner said that his Hitler (A.H.) is "a fictive figure", and that it is not he who has the last word, but Teku, the Indian tracker, who shouts "Proven". Dominick LaCapra said that Teku's declaration is ambiguous, meaning either Hitler has proved his innocence or his guilt. Steiner explained this ambiguity by adding that Teku is the Hebrew word used to indicate that "there are issues here beyond our wisdom to answer or decide."

== Reception ==
Reaction to The Portage was mixed. Anthony Burgess in The Observer called it "astonishing", Christopher Booker of The Daily Telegraph described it as a "powerful piece", and English author A. S. Byatt said it was a "masterpiece". In Explaining Hitler (1998), Rosenbaum called The Portage "A Frankenstein story", referring to Steiner's fictive Hitler having taken on a life of its own. Writing in Time magazine, Otto Friedrich described the book as "a philosophic fantasy of remarkable intensity", adding that by not refuting Hitler's speech, Steiner deviates from the horrors of traditional Holocaust literature and ends the book "on a note of bleak ambiguity".

Morris Dickstein of The New York Times was more critical of the book, calling it "a misconceived and badly executed novel, a sideshow distraction from the serious business of thinking through the unspeakable horrors of the Nazi era." He described it as "wearisome", and "suffocate[d]" by too much "fine writing" (belles-lettres). He also complained that the characters are lifeless, and while they each have detailed histories, they are only "verbal figments" that do not separate them from one another. Finally Dickstein noted that because almost all the points of Hitler's speech are drawn from some of Steiner's earlier works, he "unwittingly creates sympathy for Hitler by making him old and pathetic yet also lucid and brilliant—at once absurdly harmless and unconvincingly dangerous."

In another review in The New York Times John Leonard wrote that while the book has its strong points, "some wit, a catholic disdain, multiplicity of character and a South American swamp-life that terrifies", its weaknesses are that "the characters are really ideas, ... the symbols clash and there are too many echoes of better books by Kafka and Proust". But Leonard's biggest criticism of the book was Hitler's speech, which he called "obscene", and Steiner's decision to end the book at that point, which Leonard said "not only denies the power of art to arrange and transcend, but ... makes me sick to my stomach."

Writing in the American literary magazine Salmagundi, Alvin H. Rosenfeld called The Portage a "breakthrough work" that "astonishes". He was struck by the book's interplay between the landscape of swamp and jungle, and the "landscape of speech"—the former being "brilliantly registered" with its "immense feeling of physicality", and the latter, "even more dramatic" in the way it exposes "the dark underside of words" and how its use and misuse reveals the true nature of a person. He was particularly impressed by the depiction of Nazi hunter Emmanuel Lieber and his role as representative of the Jewish consciousness. Rosenfeld noted that while Holocaust literature often either soars to "expostulation and apostrophe", or sinks to "a dwindling sob of elegiac lament", Steiner's Lieber "mediates between these two extremes, ... simultaneously records and mourns, coldly enumerates yet carries an immense affect". What concerned the reviewer was the way Steiner used ideas from his earlier works, that he had put them "virtually verbatim" into Hitler's mouth, creating the impression that "Steiner's understanding of Hitler were identical with the latter's self-understanding". Rosenfeld also questioned why the book had to end with Hitler's speech. He said that Steiner's fictive Hitler plays "the devil's game of language subversion", making "madness [sound] like music", something the real Hitler had perfected. By stopping at this point, Rosenfeld felt that Steiner "succumb[s], rhetorically, to the seductive eloquence of negation", which undermines his own "high standards of moral intelligence". But overall Rosenfeld said The Portage "must be counted among the most vigorous attempts to portray the presence and meaning of Hitler", forcing us to confront him "in a way hardly seen before in fiction".

The Portage to San Cristobal of A.H. was a finalist in the 1983 PEN/Faulkner Award for Fiction.

== Themes ==
A central theme of The Portage is the nature of language. Rosenbaum says that Steiner's "fascination and ... distrust of speech, the love and hate for the power and terror of language, has been at the very heart of [his] remarkable career as literary prodigy and prodigal." Steiner told Rosenbaum that "in the German language, Hitler drew on a kind of rhetorical power which, in a way that is perhaps a little bit peculiar to German, allies highly abstract concepts with political, physical violence in a most unusual way". Hitler's genius lay "not so much in the written word, but the embodied voice", which Steiner described as "mesmeric". Rosenbaum notes that Steiner describes Hitler as "a kind of medium for the evil genius of the German language itself" and that his language is "like 'antimatter' to ordinary language".

Margaret Burton sees the language in the book as polarised between "a venue for truth" and "a source of destruction", with Lieber representing the former, and Hitler the latter. Bryan Cheyette considers that Steiner is not contrasting Lieber and Hitler, but is "portraying them as part of the same dialect", and that they reflect a dichotomy in Steiner himself. Alexander M. Sidorkin argues that Steiner's approach to Hitler was not to attempt to explain him, but rather to "enter ... into a dialogue" with him, a "dialogue with evil". Sidorkin suggests that Steiner had to "explore his own inner Hitler", his suppressed prejudices, to bring Hitler's speech to life.

Other themes in The Portage include the philosophical and moral analysis of history, justice, guilt and revenge. Having captured one of the world's greatest enemies, his Jewish captors are forced to examine their feelings on the situation they find themselves in. Hitler's historical significance features prominently in the book, and the recurring questions surrounding the meaning of Hitler, which Steiner makes no attempt to answer, surface periodically. Norwegian literary scholar Jakob Lothe felt that Steiner's attempts to dramatise these complex issues fail because his fiction "is too poor" for it to be effective.

== See also ==
- Adolf Hitler in popular culture
- The Holocaust in the arts and popular culture
