= Leonid Vainshtein =

Azerbaijani composer (1945–1994)

- Born: April 25, 1945; Baku, Azerbaijan SSR
- Died: June 20, 1994 (aged 49); Baku, Azerbaijan
- Education: Baku Academy of Music
- Occupation: Composer
- Children: Timur Vainshtein
- Father: Moisey Vainshtein
- Relatives: Garry Kasparov
- Family: Vainshtein
- Honours: Honored Artist of the Azerbaijan SSR

Leonid Moiseevich Vainshtein (Russian: Леонид Моисеевич Вайнштейн, April 20, 1945, Baku – June 20, 1994, Baku) was a Soviet and Azerbaijani composer, as well as Honored Artist of Azerbaijan of Jewish background.

== Biography ==
Leonid Vainshtein was born on April 20, 1945, to Moisey Vainshtein and Olga (née Belyavskaya). He graduated from the Azerbaijan State Conservatory in 1968 in the class of Gara Garayev. He worked as a docent at the composition departments of the Azerbaijan State Conservatory and the Azerbaijan National Conservatory Music College, and also as a music composer at the Azerbaijan State Russian Drama Theater. He preferred theater-stage and symphonic music.

His main works include ballet "Inspiration", rock opera "White Sun of the Desert", children's operas "Puss in Boots", "Cinderella", 6 symphonies for large symphony orchestra, Violin Concerto, Concerto for string orchestra, string quartet; "Memorial" triptych for organ (dedication to the Khojaly massacre), "Azerbaijan-60" cantata for BSO with mixed choir; oratorio "I want to return to the sea" for soloist, male choir and BSO (to the poems of Nazim Hikmet), vocal series "Sea, sky and love" (to the poems of Nabi Khazri), music for theater, movies, variety plays, romances and songs. One of his last works, "Your spring will come to Azerbaijan!" ("Азербайджан, твоя весна придёт!") was a romance.

Leonid Weinstein died in 1994 in Baku. He was married to Bayaz Vainshtein (née Vazirova), sister of Abdurrahman Vazirov, with whom he had a son called Timur. He was Harry Kasparov's uncle.

== Filmography ==
- Əgər bir yerdəyiksə ('If We Are Together', 1975)
- Gəmi saatının sirri ('The Secret of the Ship Clock', 1983)
- On yeddi yaşlı oğlan ('Seventeen-Year-Old Boy', 1985)
- Gənc qadının kişisi ('The Young Woman's Man', 1988)
- Kürən ('Redhead', 1989)
- Yaramaz kral ('Naughty King', 1990)
- Şahzadə qız ('Princess Girl', 1991)
- Ad günü ('Birthday' (animated film), 1992)
- Dostuma məktub ('Letter to My Friend', 1992)
- Unudulmuş qəhrəman ('Forgotten Hero', 2005)
- Həqiqətin özü ('The Truth Itself', 2008)
