= Lessons of the Masters =

Book by George Steiner

- Author: George Steiner
- Language: English
- Subjects: Language, translation
- Publisher: Harvard University Press
- Publication date: 2004
- Publication place: United Kingdom
- Media type: Print (hardback)

Lessons of the Masters is a 2004 book by George Steiner. It is part history, part analysis of the mentor-protégé relationship. It includes Socrates and Jesus to Husserl, Heidegger and Arendt, not leaving out Plotinus, Augustine, Shakespeare, Dante, Marlowe, Kepler, Wittgenstein, Nadia Boulanger and Simone Weil.

The book is based on Steiner's Norton lectures.
