= Lauren Weinstein =

Lauren Weinstein may refer to:

- Lauren Weinstein (technologist), American activist concerned with matters involving technology
- Lauren Weinstein (cartoonist) (born 1975), American comic book artist
- Lauren Sager Weinstein, chief data officer at Transport for London
