= Laure Adler =

French journalist, writer, publisher, radio and TV producer (born 1950)

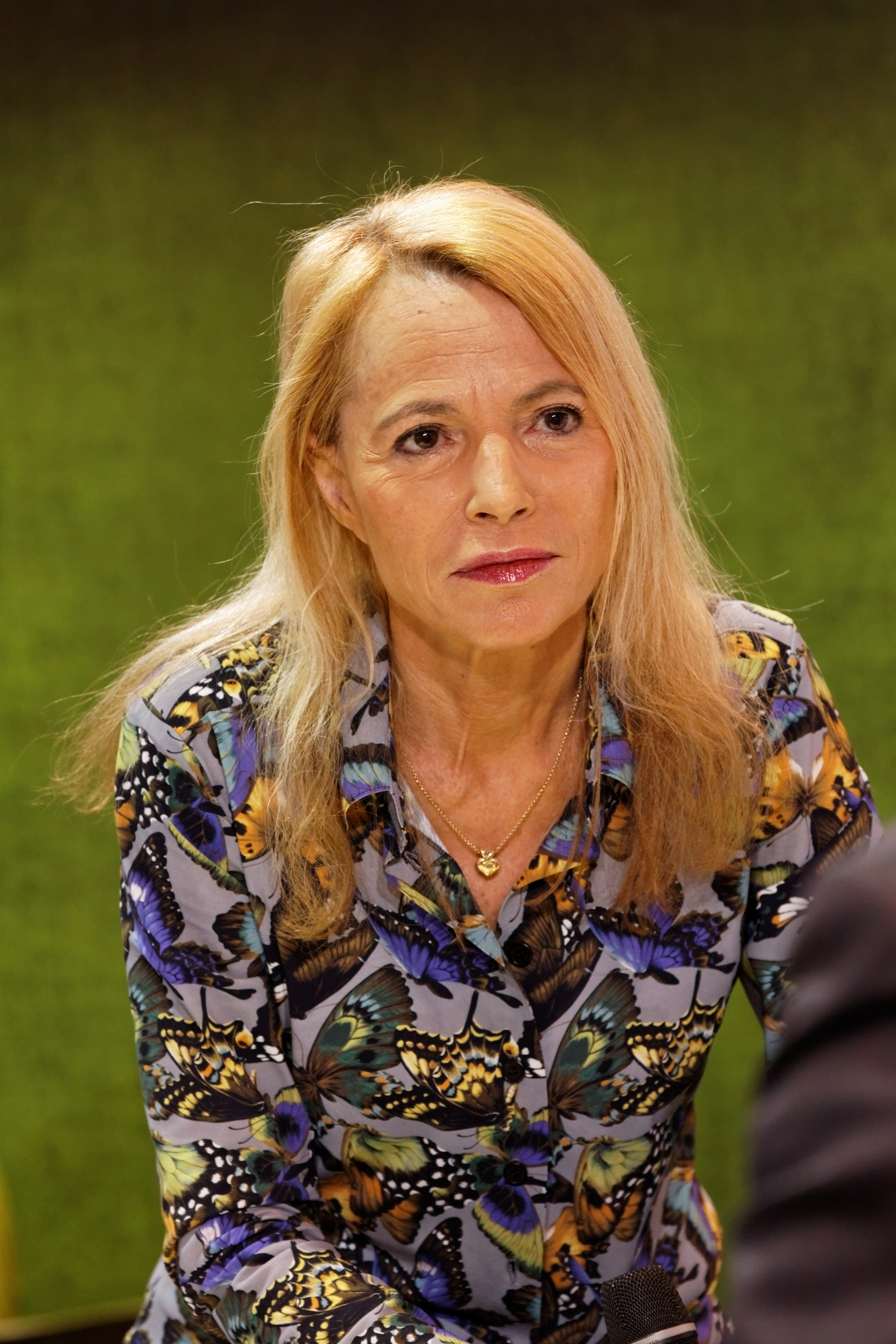
- Laure Adler at the Paris Book fair (2012)

Director of France Culture
- In office 1999–2005
- Preceded by: Patrice Gélinet
- Succeeded by: David Kessler

Personal details
- Born: Laure Clauzet; 11 March 1950 (age 76) Caen, France
- Spouse(s): Alfred Adler; Alain Veinstein
- Children: 3
- Profession: Journalist

Laure Adler (née Laure Clauzet; born 11 March 1950) is a French journalist, writer, publisher and radio/TV producer.

== Works ==
=== Biographies ===
- 1986: L'Amour à l'arsenic : histoire de Marie Lafarge, Denoël.
- 1998: Marguerite Duras, Éditions Gallimard
- 2005: Dans les pas de Hannah Arendt, Gallimard
- 2008: L'insoumise, Simone Weil, Actes Sud
- 2011: Françoise, Grasset (on Françoise Giroud).
- 2012: Dans les pas de Hannah Arendt, Gallimard
- 2015: François Mitterrand, journées particulières, Flammarion
- 2022: Charlotte Perriand, Gallimard

=== Essays ===
- 1979: À l'Aube du féminisme : les premières journalistes, Payot.
- 1981: Misérable et glorieuse. La femme au XIXe siècle, under the direction of Jean-Paul Aron, Fayard.
- 1983: Secrets d'alcôve : une histoire du couple de 1830 à 1930, Hachette Littératures.
- 1987: Avignon : 40 ans de festival, with Alain Veinstein, Hachette.
- 1990: La Vie quotidienne dans les maisons closes de 1830 à 1930, Hachette.
- 1994: Les Femmes politiques, Le Seuil.
- 2006: Les femmes qui lisent sont dangereuses, with Stefan Bollmann, Flammarion.
- 2007: Les femmes qui écrivent vivent dangereusement, with Stefan Bollmann, Flammarion.
- 2008: Femmes hors du voile, photographs by Isabelle Eshraghi, éditions du Chêne.
- 2009: Les femmes qui aiment sont dangereuses, with Elisa Lécosse, Flammarion.
- 2010: La Beauté des nuits du monde by Marguerite Duras, texts selected and presented by Laure Adler, La Quinzaine littéraire, series "Voyager avec"
- 2011: Les femmes qui lisent sont de plus en plus dangereuses, with Stefan Bollmann, Flammarion.
- 2011: Manifeste féministe, éd. Autrement.
- 2012: Le Bruit du monde, éditions Universitaires d'Avignon.
- 2013: La Vie quotidienne dans les maisons closes, éditions Fayard.
- 2016: Tous les soirs, éditions Actes Sud.

=== Tales ===
- 1995: L'Année des adieux, Flammarion (rééd. 2011, with a foreword).
- 2001: À ce soir, Gallimard.

=== Novel ===
- 2013: Immortelles, Grasset.

=== Interviews ===
- 2002: Avant que la nuit ne vienne, with Pierre de Benouville, Grasset.
- 2006: Jean-Pierre Chevènement : entretiens, éditions Michel de Maule.
- 2007: Starck, Philippe : entretiens, Flammarion.
- 2007: J. Attali : entretiens, éditions Michel de Maule.
- 2009: Le Théâtre, oui quand même, with Jacques Lassalle, éditions Universitaires d'Avignon.
- 2009: Histoire de notre collection de tableaux - Pierre Bergé Yves Saint Laurent, with Pierre Bergé, Actes Sud.
- 2009: La Passion de l'absolu, with George Steiner, éditions de l'Aube.
- 2010: Roland Dumas : entretiens, éditions Michel de Maule.
- 2011: Le Chemin de la vie, with Maurice Nadeau, éditions Verdier.

=== Prefaces ===
- 2000: Une histoire du racisme : des origines à nos jours by Christian Delacampagne, Le Livre de Poche/France Culture.
- 2002: Petites chroniques de la vie comme elle va by Étienne Gruillot, Éditions du Seuil.
- 2003: Marguerite Duras et l'histoire by Stéphane Patrice, PUF.
- 2004: Rwanda : un génocide oublié ? Un procès pour mémoire by Laure de Vulpian, Brussels, éditions Complexe.
- 2005: Les Deux Amants de Marie de France, Bruxelles, éditions Complexe.
- 2010: Alain Crombecque. Au fil des rencontres by Christine Crombecque, postface, Actes Sud.
- 2010: Voyage et gourmandises en pays Salers by Régine Rossi-Lagorce, éditions Mines de rien.
- 2011: Dimanche et autres nouvelles by Irène Némirovsky, Le Livre de Poche.

=== Participations ===
- 1999: L'Illettrisme en toutes lettres. Textes, analyses, documents, entretiens, témoignages, éditions Flohic.
- 2005: Paris. Au nom des femmes, Descartes & Cie.
- 2006: L'Universel au féminin, tome 3, L'Harmattan.
- 2008: Festival d'Aix : 1948-2008, Actes Sud.
- 2010: Voyager avec Marguerite Duras, édition La Quinzaine littéraire.
- 2010: Pensez, lisez. 40 livres pour rester intelligent !!!, Éditions Points.
- 2012: Le Bruit du monde : le geste et la parole, éditions universitaires d'Avignon.

== Decorations ==
- Officer of the Legion of Honour, 31 December 2015
