= Stephanie J. Weinstein =

American nutritionist and epidemiologist

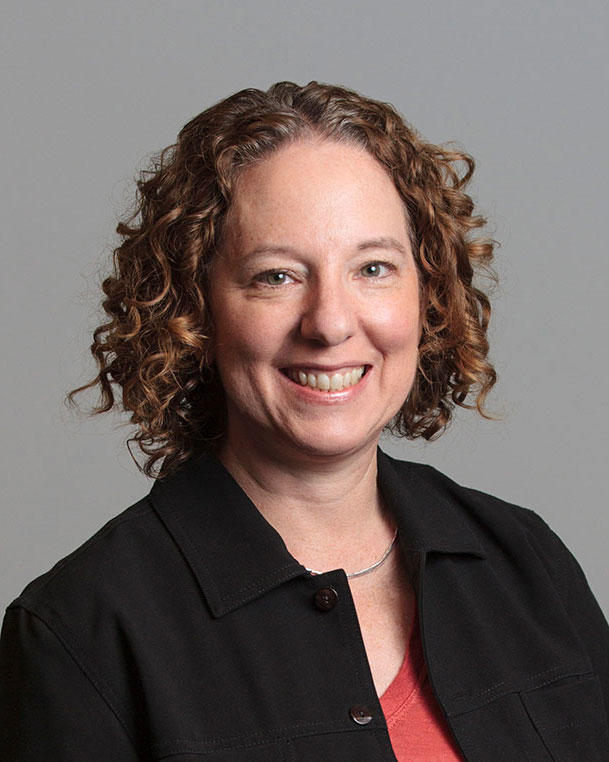
- Born: Stephanie Joan Weinstein; 1967 (age 58–59); Boston, Massachusetts, U.S.
- Education: Tufts University; Cornell University
- Scientific career
- Fields: Nutrition, cancer epidemiology, one-carbon metabolism
- Workplaces: National Cancer Institute

Stephanie Joan Weinstein (born 1967) is an American nutritionist and cancer epidemiologist who is a staff scientist in the metabolic epidemiology branch at the National Cancer Institute. She researches diet and cancer associations with a focus on vitamin D, vitamin E, and one-carbon metabolism. Weinstein was formerly an environmental toxicologist at a consulting firm.

== Life ==
Weinstein was born 1967 in Boston. She graduated from Andover High School. She received a B.S. in biology from Tufts University. After completing her undergraduate studies, Weinstein was an environmental toxicologist at the Jellinek, Schwartz & Connolly, Inc. consulting firm in Washington, D.C.

Weinstein earned a M.S. (1995) and Ph.D. (1998) in nutrition from Cornell University. Her master's thesis was titled, Hispanics in metropolitan New York: perceptions and practices related to seafood. Weinstein's dissertation focused on one-carbon metabolism and cervical cancer. It was titled, Serum and red blood cell folate levels in relation to invasive cervical cancer risk in a multicenter case-control study of United States women. Carole Bisogni was her doctoral advisor. Weinstein's research was influenced by mentor Regina G. Ziegler.

Weinstein was a postdoctoral fellow in the nutritional epidemiology branch (NEB), division of cancer epidemiology and genetics (DCEG), National Cancer Institute (NCI), for three years. After working for one year as a nutritionist in the Center for Nutrition Policy and Promotion, she returned to NCI as a staff scientist in NEB in 2002. She works in the metabolic epidemiology branch. Weinstein publishes on diet and cancer associations, with a focus on vitamin D, vitamin E, and one-carbon metabolism. She manages the Alpha-Tocopherol, Beta-Carotene Cancer Prevention (ATBC) Study, a prospective cohort study that began as a clinical trial. Weinstein works with the data coordinating center for the Connect for Cancer Prevention Study, a prospective cohort of 200,000 adults in the United States.
