= Michael Weinstein =

Michael Weinstein may refer to:

- Mike Weinstein (born 1949), Member of the Florida House of Representatives
- Michael H. Weinstein (born 1960), Swiss composer
- Michael L. Weinstein, former U.S. Air Force officer, founder of the Military Religious Freedom Foundation
- Michael A. Weinstein (1942–2015), American political philosopher and political scientist
- AIDS Healthcare Foundation, founded by Michael Weinstein
