= David Weinstein =

David Weinstein may refer to:

- David E. Weinstein (born 1964), American economist
- David F. Weinstein (born 1936), American politician
- David Weinstein (musician) (born 1954), American musician and composer
- Dave Weinstein (born 1988), American cybersecurity consultant
