= Matthew Weinstein =

American painter

Matthew Weinstein (born May 6, 1964 in New York City) is an American visual artist, installation sculptor and film maker.

== Art ==
Matthew Weinstein's early works throughout the 1990s focused on gestural abstraction, cartoon drawing, photographic-based imagery of ghostly images, and a fascination with blood, death, skulls and bones.

Currently, Weinstein's primary medium is 3D animation and 3D rendering. Using the 3D modeling and rendering program Maya, he creates videos of animated spectacles, involving actors, musicians and animators. He then creates paintings and sculptures using a wide variety of technologies, such as bronze casting, rapid prototyping sculpture, airbrush, stenciling and resin casting. As Weinstein's cast of virtual singing characters expands, a digital repertory company begins to exist, with characters from one project appearing in another, or in a painting or a sculpture.

Weinstein's digital drawings and videos explore the often ambiguous line between reality and unreality in an American culture that increasingly experiences reality through the filter of a virtual world. In contrast to the precision-like rendering of his constructed and sculptural compositions, the overall impact of this work is one of unreality, or rather "hyperclarity", in which reality and unreality merge, becoming indistinguishable. Drawing on a number of influences, most notably early Japanese animation and the ancient aesthetic discipline of Ikebana floral arrangement to futuristic science fiction, Weinstein sets up a balance between the real and the abstract as well as nature and artifice. For the animated video installation entitled "SIAM", a computer animation of a couple of Siamese fighting fish, Weinstein wrote both the music and choreographed the performance.

== Life ==
Matthew Weinstein grew up in New York City with his father, I. Bernard Weinstein, who headed the Herbert Irving Comprehensive Cancer Center at Columbia University and has been credited with helping create the field of molecular epidemiology, and his mother, the former Joan Anker; and his sisters Claudia, of Manhattan, and Tamara, of Atlanta, Georgia. He received his Bachelor of Arts degree from Columbia University in 1987. Weinstein lives and works in New York.

Weinstein's primary gallery is the Sonnabend Gallery in New York. He is also represented by the Baldwin Gallery in Aspen, Colorado and exhibits nationally and internationally. In 2004 alone, his work was the subject of a major installation at the Pinakothek der Moderne in Munich, Germany, and his films were projected in the Kunsthalle Vienna, Austria and screened at The Wexner Center for the Arts in Columbus, Ohio.

Weinstein is the recipient of many awards, including a Wexner Center for the Arts grant.

== Museum Collections ==
Weinstein's works of art are in private and public collections around the world, including the Metropolitan Museum of Art in New York, the Nassau County Museum of Art in Roslyn, NY, the Sammlung Goetz and the Bayerische Staatsgemäldesammlungen in Munich, Germany.
