= Jacob Sager Weinstein =

American screenwriter

- Born: January 8, 1972 (age 54); Washington, D.C., United States
- Education: Princeton University
- Occupations: Author; humorist; comedy writer; screenwriter
- Spouse: Lauren Sager Weinstein
- Relatives: Josh Weinstein (brother)

Jacob Sager Weinstein (born January 8, 1972) is an American author, humorist, comedy writer, and screenwriter.

Sager Weinstein was born in Washington, D.C., and is a graduate of Princeton University, where he was a charter member of the school's improvisational comedy troupe, Quipfire!. He currently lives in London and is married to Lauren Sager Weinstein. He is the brother of television writer Josh Weinstein.

For three years he was a staff writer for Dennis Miller Live, for which he received a Writers Guild of America award in 2001. Earlier he was a contributor to The Onion, and he has also written for McSweeney's Internet Tendency, the North American Review, and The New Republic.

Sager Weinstein co-wrote with Matthew David Brozik three humor books: in 2005 The Government Manual for New Superheroes; The Government Manual for New Wizards in 2006; and The Government Manual for New Pirates in 2007.

In 2012 he published the sardonically titled How Not To Kill Your Baby.

Sager Weinstein is the author of the Hyacinth Series, a middle-grade fantasy trilogy about enchanted rivers under London.

In 2018, he published the picture book, Lyric McKerrigan, Secret Librarian, with art by Vera Brosgol.

He also wrote a screenplay adapted from the 1937 novel Utas és holdvilág (Journey by Moonlight) by the Hungarian writer Antal Szerb. The film, to be directed by István Szabó, is still in production.

== Published works ==
- Brozik, Matthew D.; Weinstein, Jacob S. (September 1, 2005). The Government Manual for New Superheroes. Kansas City, Mo: Andrews McMeel Publishing. p. 160. ISBN 0740754629. ISBN 978-0740754623
- Brozik, Matthew D.; Sager Weinstein, Jacob (May 1, 2006). The Government Manual for New Wizards. Kansas City, Mo: Andrews McMeel Publishing. pp. 192. ISBN 0740757326.
- Brozik, Matthew D.; Sager Weinstein, Jacob (April 1, 2007). The Government Manual for New Pirates. Kansas City, Mo: Andrews McMeel Publishing. pp. 144. ISBN 978-0740767906. ISBN 978-0740767906
- Sager Weinstein, Jacob (March 20, 2012). How Not To Kill Your Baby. Kansas City, Mo: Andrews McMeel Publishing. p. 136. ISBN 978-1449409913. ISBN 978-1449409913
- Sager Weinstein, Jacob (May 23, 2017). Hyacinth and the Secrets Beneath. New York, NY: Random House Children's Books. p. 304. ISBN 978-0399553172. ISBN 978-0399553172. Published in the UK as The City of Secret Rivers.
- Sager Weinstein, Jacob (May 15, 2018). Hyacinth and the Stone Thief. New York, NY: Random House Children's Books. p. 320. ISBN 978-0399553172. ISBN 978-0399553172. Published in the UK as The City of Guardian Stones.
- Sager Weinstein, Jacob (September 4, 2018). Lyric McKerrigan, Secret Librarian. New York, NY: Clarion Books. p. 48. ISBN 978-0544801226. ISBN 978-0544801226
