= Regina G. Ziegler =

American nutritional epidemiologist

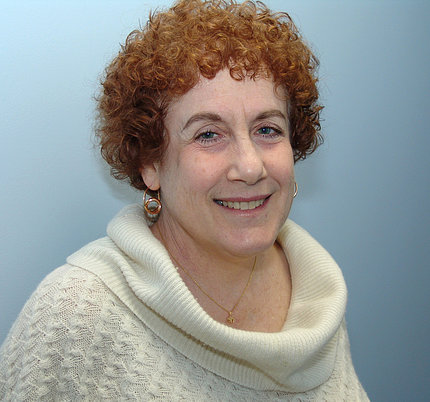
- Ziegler in 2009
- Education: Swarthmore College; University of California, Berkeley; Harvard T.H. Chan School of Public Health
- Scientific career
- Fields: Biochemistry, cancer and nutritional epidemiology
- Workplaces: National Cancer Institute

Regina Gale Ziegler is an American biochemist and nutritional epidemiologist who researched dietary, nutritional, anthropometric, and hormonal determinants of cancer risk. She was a senior investigator in the National Cancer Institute's epidemiology and biostatistics program.

== Life ==
Ziegler received a B.A. from Swarthmore College, going on to complete a Ph.D. in biochemistry from the University of California, Berkeley. Her 1971 dissertation was titled, Affinity labelling lysozyme with a carbene. She earned a M.P.H. from Harvard T.H. Chan School of Public Health. After graduate school, she taught international nutrition and global food resources courses at Yale University, Harvard University, and Tufts University.

Ziegler joined the National Cancer Institute (NCI) in 1979, was tenured in 1987, and has served most recently as a senior investigator in the epidemiology and biostatistics program. Ziegler’s research has focused broadly on dietary, nutritional, anthropometric, and hormonal determinants of cancer risk. Her early work helped characterize the role of vegetables and fruits, individual carotenoids, folate and one-carbon metabolism in cancer etiology. In addition, she has conducted a number of breast cancer studies with emphasis on anthropometry, diet and endogenous hormones and growth factors. She helped design and direct a large, population-based case-control study of breast cancer in Asian-American women to elucidate the modifiable exposures, related to lifestyle and/or environment, that explained the 6-fold difference in breast cancer incidence between Asia and the West. Ziegler collaboratively developed an international pooled analysis of circulating vitamin D concentrations in relation to risk of colorectal and breast cancer.

Ziegler applied her training in chemistry and biochemistry to the development of new and improved methods for measuring various hormones and nutrients in epidemiologic studies. She played a critical role in the successful development of a sensitive assay for assessment of estrogen metabolites and a validated assay for concurrent measurement of the major steroid hormones. Ziegler is a fellow of the American Society for Nutrition and helped establish its nutritional epidemiology research interest section.

Ziegler retired in October 2018.
