= In Bluebeard's Castle =

1971 book by George Steiner

In Bluebeard's Castle: Some Notes Towards the Redefinition of Culture
- Cover of the first edition
- Author: George Steiner
- Language: English
- Published: 1971 (Faber and Faber)
- Publication place: United Kingdom
- Media type: Print
- Pages: 154
- ISBN: 978-0300017106

In Bluebeard's Castle: Some Notes Towards the Redefinition of Culture is a 1971 book by George Steiner.

== Content ==
In Bluebeard's Castle: Some Notes Towards the Redefinition of Culture is composed of four brief lectures by Steiner with interlocking themes, chiefly the fragmentation and dissolution of Western culture from the French Revolution onwards (particularly from the perspective of a perceived break with tradition, whether Jewish, Christian, Greek or Latin), with a meditation of what kind of future culture might develop over the course of time. It engages with one of Steiner's perennial concerns: that of the long-term ramifications of the Holocaust on our cultural values and cultural productions, and the questions that arise from it in terms of the growth and development of anti-semitism over time. In Steiner's view, the existence of the Holocaust meant that the long trajectory of Western culture with roots in numerous different valuable sources such as Periclean Athens was effectively finished – a similar line of argument to that navigated in the 1967 work Language and Silence.

Furthermore, in the work Steiner argues that the Holocaust was a kind of response or product of the Jews having provided Europe with conscience and, in a sense, a 'summons to perfection' which holds up to a vision of perfectibility which cannot be reached but which we cannot let go of either because of its "supreme value".

The work cites a wide multiplicity of authors; chapter 4, "Tomorrow", for instance, begins with an extended analysis of the way in which the poem Lycidas by John Milton had become imbricated in wider culture.

The four lectures are titled as follows:

1. "The Great Ennui"
2. "A Season in Hell" (named after a poem by Arthur Rimbaud)
3. "In A Post-Culture"
4. "Tomorrow"

The work has provided a number of remarkable quotations.

The themes explored by Steiner in this work were developed further in later writing, particularly in his controversial 1981 novella The Portage to San Cristobal of A.H..

== See also ==
- Bluebeard's Castle
