= Michael H. Weinstein =

Swiss composer (born 1960)

Michael H. Weinstein (born June 26, 1960) is a Swiss composer active in America.

Weinstein has written music for all major genres of art music—with the exception of opera—though he is primarily known for his works for wind ensemble. His style melds the lightness of Mozart with the rhythmic complexity of Stravinsky, and, while his music is fundamentally tonal, he employ's twelve tone techniques to create tension and ambiguity.

Weinstein's music has been performed throughout America, Europe and Russia. His Concerto for Wind Ensemble (1989) was recorded by Eugene Corporon and the Cincinnati Wind Ensemble for the Klavier label. He has received numerous commissions including the Chamber Symphony (commissioned by the American Composer's Forum, 2005) the Serenade for Twelve Instruments (commissioned by New England Conservatory, 2000; published by Boosey & Hawkes), The Roman Odes (commissioned by Massachusetts Institute of Technology, 2001.)and Two Elegies (commissioned by the USAF Band, Washington, DC, 1998) among others.

Reviewing the premiere of Weinstein's Concerto for Horn, Anthony Tommasini described Weinsteins's music: “The harmonic language is tonal; the style is neoclassical in the tradition of Copland, with a sometimes fractured phrase structure that suggests Stravinsky. The textures and interweavings of contrapuntal lines are clear and unmysterious. . .the score is capably crafted and the audience was taken with it. Reviewing the premiere of the Concerto for Wind Ensemble, Richard Buell wrote in the Boston Globe, “. . .this big, massive piece showed poise, finish, clear-headedness, an attractive fascination with line. It had the radiance of potential realizing itself.

He is currently the head of the music department of the Cambridge School of Weston and serves on the faculties of the Berklee College of Music the Walnut Hill School for the Arts, and the New England Conservatory Preparatory Division.

== Partial list of works ==
=== Large ensemble ===
- The Angel of Fame (2004)
- Four Songs Without Words on Poems of Kleist for Concert Band (2003)
- Suite of Dances for Double Woodwind Quintet and Two Percussion (2003)
- Serenade for Twelve Instruments (2002)
- Roman Odes for SATB Chorus, Solo Horn and Wind Ensemble (2001)
- Serenade for Fifteen Instruments (2000)
- Two Movements for Brass Ensemble (1997)
- Serenade for Concert Band (1997)
- Two Elegies for Wind Ensemble (1995)
- Five Songs on poems of Robert Frost for Baritone and Concert Band (1995)
- Concertino for Saxophone & Orchestra (1993)
- Serenade for Horn and Orchestra (1990)
- Concerto for Wind Ensemble (1989)
- Concerto for Euphonium and Chamber Orchestra (1985)

=== Chamber works ===
- Three Movements for Brass Quartet (1998)
- Octet for Wind Instruments (1996)
- Interlude for Brass Octet (1994)
- Trio for Horn, Violin, and Piano (1993)
- Chanson d'Espoir for Woodwind Quintet (1993)
- Four Rilke Songs for Soprano, Horn, and Piano (1992)
- Brass Quintet no. 2 (1992)
- Brass Quintet #1 (1987)
- Quartet for Trombone and String Trio (1987)
- "Fantasie" for Two trumpets and Organ (1985)
- Woodwind Quintet #1 (1981–85)

=== Solo works ===
- Sonata for Solo Horn (1997)
- Sonata #2 for Horn and Piano (1991)
- Sonata #1 for Horn and Piano (1985)
- Willard Songs for Baritone, Children's Chorus, Horn, Piano & Two Percussion (2004)
- Roman Odes for SATB Chorus, Solo Horn and Wind Ensemble (2001)
- Four Songs on Poems of George Meredith for SATB Chorus, Hn., & Pn (1999)
- Three Rilke Songs for Children's Chorus, Horn, & Piano (1998)
- Three Psalms for Male Chorus, Horn, and Piano (1985)
