= Otto Friedrich =

American journalist (1929–1995)

Otto Alva Friedrich (1929 in Boston, Massachusetts – April 25, 1994 in Manhasset, New York), was an American author, and historian. The son of the political theorist, and Harvard professor Carl Joachim Friedrich, Otto Friedrich graduated from Harvard University in 1948 with a degree in history. Upon graduation, he became a journalist and then the managing editor of The Saturday Evening Post in 1965. After the Post closed down, he spent the remainder of his career at TIME magazine, where he wrote more than 40 cover stories. During this time, he also authored more than 14 books on diverse subjects ranging from Hollywood in the 1940s to the rise of Nazi Germany, to Paris in the age of Édouard Manet. In 1970, he won the George Polk Award for his book Decline and Fall, about The Saturday Evening Post. Otto Friedrich was married to Priscilla Boughton, with whom he had five children. He died of lung cancer at the North Shore University Hospital in Manhasset, New York in 1995.
