= David E. Weinstein =

American economist (born 1964)

David Weinstein
- Born: 1964 (age 60–61)

Academic background
- Alma mater: Yale University (BA); University of Michigan (MA, PhD)

Academic work
- Institutions: Columbia University
- Website: Official website

David E. Weinstein II (born 1964) is an American economist. Since 1999, he has served as the Carl S. Shoup Professor of Japanese Economy at Columbia University. Before teaching at Columbia, Weinstein taught at University of Michigan and Harvard University. He also served on the Council of Economic Advisers from 1989 to 1990.

== Education ==
- BA, economics, Yale University, 1985
- MA, economics, University of Michigan, 1988
- PhD, economics, University of Michigan, 1991

== Honours ==
- Order of the Rising Sun, 3rd Class, Gold Rays with Neck Ribbon (2023)
