= Paul Weinstein =

Paul Weinstein may refer to:

- Paul Weinstein (athlete) (1878–1964), German high jumper
- Paul Weinstein (economist), American economist and political adviser
