= I. Bernard Weinstein =

American physician and researcher

I. Bernard Weinstein (September 9, 1930 – November 3, 2008) was an American physician and researcher who studied the effect of pollutants and other environmental factors in causing cancer and headed the Comprehensive Cancer Center at Columbia University. He has been credited with helping create the field of molecular epidemiology, which studies how genetic and environmental risk factors are related to the spread of disease in populations.

== Biography ==
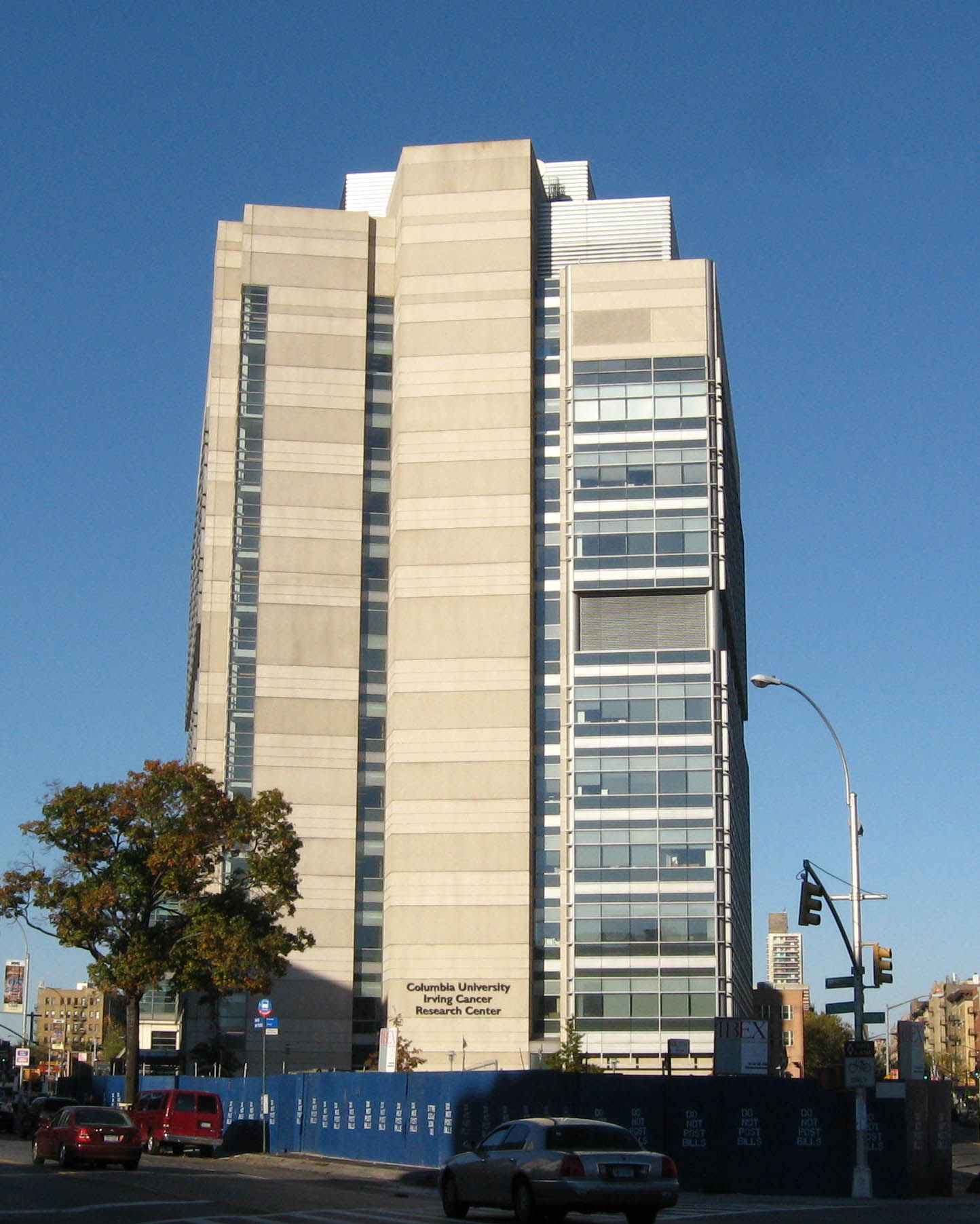
Irving Comprehensive Cancer Research Center

Weinstein was born in Madison, Wisconsin as the youngest of four sons of Russian immigrants. He earned an undergraduate degree from the University of Wisconsin–Madison. He also earned his medical degree there and conducted research at Harvard University and the Massachusetts Institute of Technology. He was hired by Columbia University as an assistant professor of medicine in 1961 and appointed as a professor in 1973. From 1978 to 1990, he was director of the division of environmental sciences at Columbia Mailman School of Public Health. He held appointments on the Columbia faculty as professor of genetics and development and public health at the Herbert Irving Comprehensive Cancer Center of Columbia University and as the school's Frobe Jensen Professor of Medicine.

Starting in the 1970s, Weinstein was among the first groups of researchers to make the connection between chemical compounds that are commonly found in the environment and their cancer-causing potential by identifying carcinogens that would be able to find molecular targets in the body. Weinstein investigated the cancer risks caused by benzo[a]pyrene, which is found in automobile exhaust, barbecued food and tobacco smoke. He also studied nitrosamines, a cancer-causing compound found in cured and smoked meats and in pickled foods, generated when nitrites in the food react with strong acids or high temperatures.

Neuroscientist Richard Axel, a student of Weinstein's who shared the 2004 Nobel Prize in Physiology or Medicine, described how his mentor's "knowledge of emerging molecular genetics was combined with his research on the chemical causes of cancer to help in the creation of a new field, the field of molecular epidemiology".

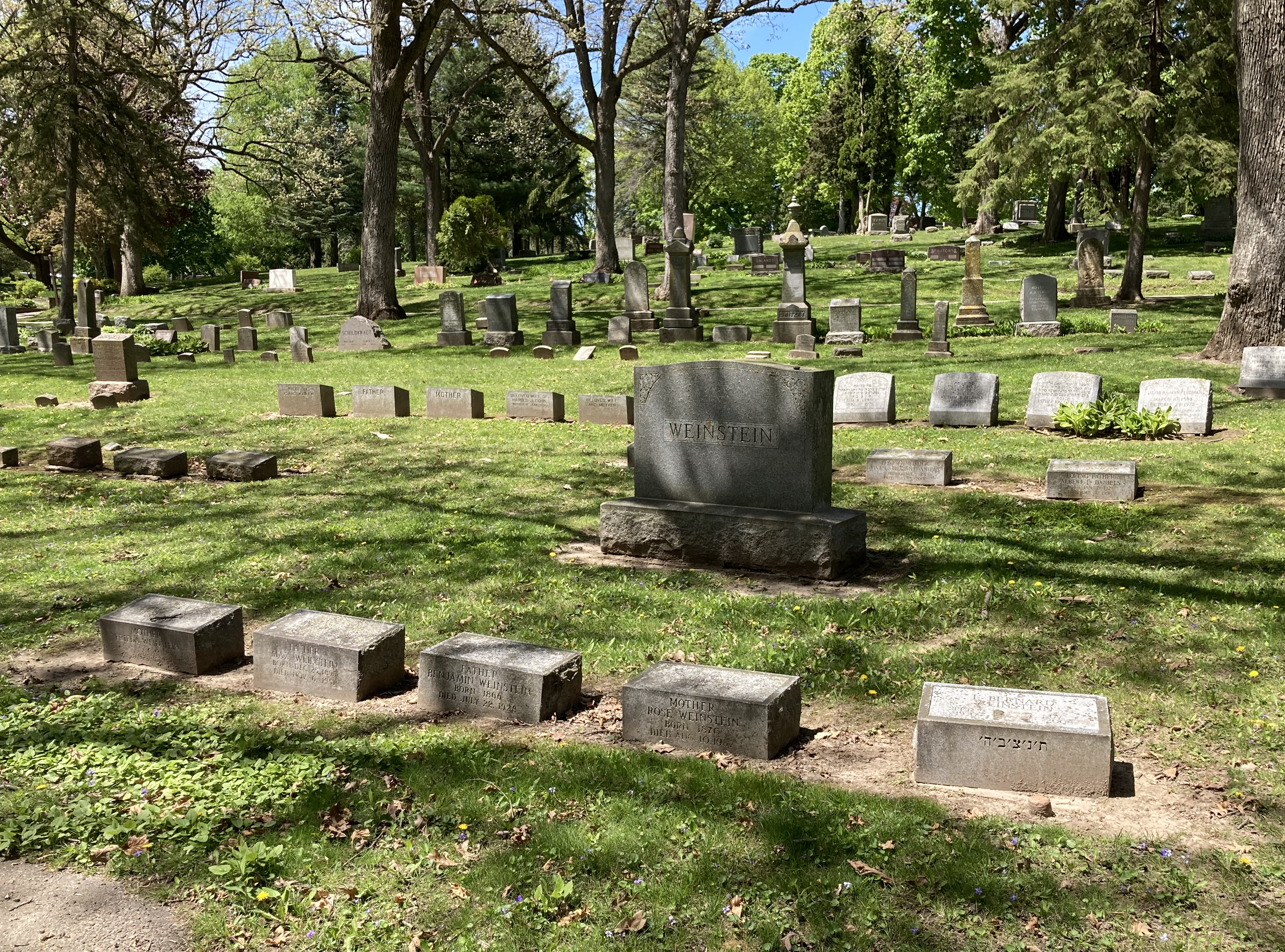
Weinstein's grave (front right) at Forest Hill Cemetery

Studies performed by Weinstein in the 1990s of the human gene cyclin D1 showed that variations of the gene could foster the growth of cancer cells and tumor formation in the breast, esophagus, prostate and stomach, which led to theories that drugs targeted at cyclin D1 could help prevent the development of these cancers.

Weinstein died at age 78 on November 3, 2008, in Manhattan of kidney disease, and was buried at Forest Hill Cemetery in Madison, Wisconsin. He is survived by his spouse, the former Joan Anker, a son, the contemporary artist Matthew Weinstein, and two daughters, Claudia, of Manhattan, and Tamara, of Atlanta, Georgia.
