= United Nations Security Council Counter-Terrorism Committee =

Counterterrorist organization

The Counter-Terrorism Committee is a subsidiary body of the United Nations Security Council.

In the wake of the 11 September 2001 terrorist attacks in the United States, the United Nations Security Council unanimously adopted resolution 1373, which, among its provisions, obliges all States to criminalize assistance for terrorist activities, deny financial support and safe haven to terrorists and share information about groups planning terrorist attacks.

The 15-member Counter-Terrorism Committee was established at the same time to monitor implementation of the resolution. While the ultimate aim of the committee is to increase the ability of States to fight terrorism, it is not a sanctions body nor does it maintain a list of terrorist groups or individuals.

While the Counter-Terrorism Committee is not a direct capacity provider it does act as a broker between those states or groups that have the relevant capacities and those in the need of assistance.

Seeking to revitalize the committee's work, in 2004 the Security Council adopted Resolution 1535, creating the Counter-Terrorism Committee Executive Directorate (CTED) to provide the CTC with expert advice on all areas covered by resolution 1373. CTED was established also with the aim of facilitating technical assistance to countries, as well as promoting closer cooperation and coordination both within the UN system of organizations and among regional and intergovernmental bodies.

During the September 2005 World Summit at the UN, the Security Council – meeting at the level of Heads of States or Government for just the third time in its history – adopted Resolution 1624 concerning incitement to commit acts of terrorism. The resolution also stressed the obligations of countries to comply with international human rights laws.

The leaders also resolved to conclude work on the draft comprehensive convention on international terrorism, including a legal definition of terrorist acts, during the sixtieth session of the General Assembly. This achievement would mark the culmination of years of negotiation and debate on various proposals, including those contained in Secretary-General Kofi Annan's report, "In Larger Freedom." In this document, he called urgently for the adoption of a definition of terrorism similar to that contained in the report of the High-level Panel on Threats, Challenges and Change, which states "that the targeting and deliberate killing of civilians and non-combatants cannot be justified or legitimized by any cause or grievance, and that any action intended to cause death or serious bodily harm to civilians or non-combatants, when the purpose of such an act, by its nature or context, is to intimidate a population or to compel a government or an international organization to carry out or to abstain from any act cannot be justified on any grounds and constitutes an act of terrorism."

== Counter-Terrorism Centre ==
The United Nations Counter-Terrorism Centre was established in 2011 within the Counter-Terrorism Implementation Task Force Office in the Department of Political Affairs. It provides capacity-building support for Member States in implementing the United Nations Global Counter-Terrorism Strategy.

== Counter Terrorism Trust Fund ==
The trust fund was established to support the implementation of the United Nations Global Counter-Terrorism Strategy.
