= Lauren Sager Weinstein =

American computer scientist

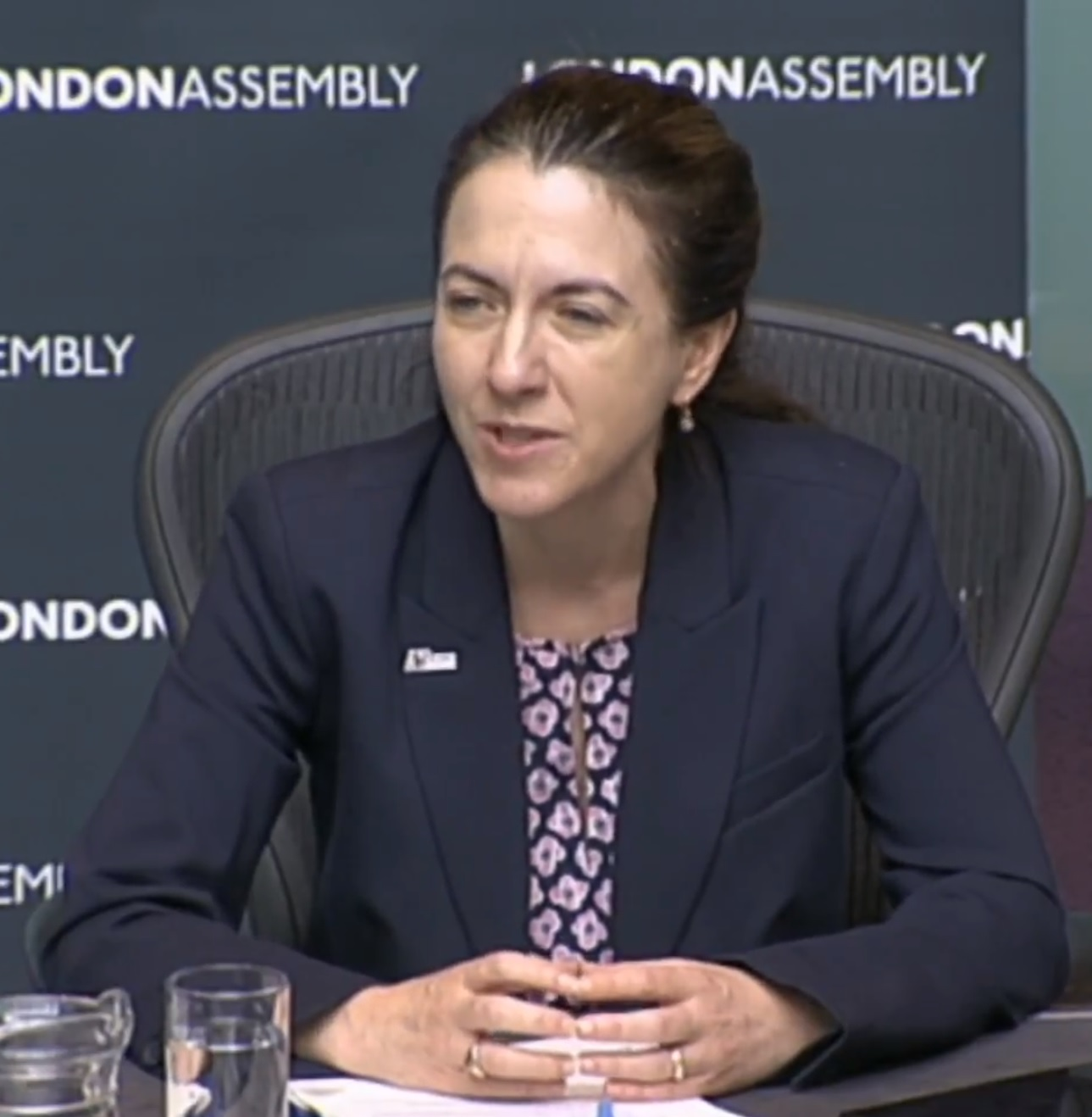
- Lauren Sager Weinstein speaks to the London Transport Committee in 2017
- Born: Washington, D.C., United States
- Education: Princeton University (BA); Harvard Kennedy School (MPP)
- Employer: Transport for London
- Known for: Big data in transport
- Spouse: Jacob Sager Weinstein
- Relatives: Josh Weinstein (brother-in-law)

Lauren Sager Weinstein is the Chief Data Officer at Transport for London. She helps TFL use big data to optimise transport in London.

== Early life and education ==
She grew up in Washington, D.C., in a family of engineers. Sager Weinstein completed a bachelor's of arts at Princeton University in 1995. She earned a Masters of Public Policy at Harvard Kennedy School in 2002. She met her husband, Jacob Sager Weinstein, whilst at Princeton University.

== Career ==
Sager Weinstein worked as Field and Planning Deputy in Los Angeles where her husband was working as a screenwriter. She worked for the policy think-tank RAND Corporation. Based on this work, she published Return to Work in California Workers' Compensation in 2005. Sager Weinstein is interested in how transport networks influence cities and how they function.

Sager Weinstein began working for Transport for London in 2002 as a Senior Business Planner. She worked on the introduction of the Oyster card, London's contactless payment card system. She has held various roles at TFL, including Chief of Staff, Head of Oyster Development, Head of Analytics. She is the lead for data development. Over 30 million journeys are made on roads and public transport networks in London every day. TFL collect a significant range of data; including ticketing, bus journeys and records from SCOOT traffic detectors. They have a transparent approach to privacy. The big data sets help Sager Weinstein understand patterns and trends, helping customers travel across the network. TFL have an academic partnership with Massachusetts Institute of Technology, looking to develop a big data solution to overcrowding on public transport.

Sager Weinstein established the first long-term funding packing for infrastructure investment at TFL. When Wandsworth Council were forced to close Putney Bridge for emergency repairs, Sager Weinstein set up a transport interchange and increased bus service on nearby routes to help passengers whose journeys might be affected. She provided the transport analysis which kept Londoners moving during the 2012 Summer Olympics. She led the TFL pilot using depersonalised WiFi Data for analysis. The WiFi connectivity pilot cost £100,000, but the data was worth £322 million. It revealed that passengers take more than 18 different routes when travelling between King's Cross St Pancras and Waterloo. Sager Weinstein published the report "Review of the TfL WiFi Pilot" in 2017.

In 2013 she spoke at the Big Data Analytics conference in London. She was listed in The Female Lead's 20 in Data & Technology.
