= Joshua Weinstein =

Joshua Weinstein may refer to:

- Josh Weinstein (born 1966), American television writer and producer, known for his work on The Simpsons
- Joshua Weinstein (director), independent filmmaker who directed the feature film Menashe (2017) and the documentary Driver's Wanted (2012)
- J. Elvis Weinstein (born 1971), American writer and performer, known for his work on Mystery Science Theater 3000
- Precision Tunes, real name Joshua Weinstein, New York-based music producer
