= Todd Jay Weinstein =

American photographer

- Born: 1951; Detroit
- Occupation: Photographer

Todd Jay Weinstein (born 1951) is a photographer and artist, born in Detroit, Michigan, and who now lives in New York City. Todd's first started photography back in high school in the mid 1960s. After graduating high school he studied at the Center for Creative Studies under his teacher George Phillips. Worked as 3rd assistant to the photographer Dick James studio in Detroit Michigan, after moving to New York City in 1970 Todd started working at the Gaslight folk music club which move to upstairs at Max's Kansas City. Was also part of the theater troop The Banana Company. With the luck of meeting the photographer Burt Stern's assistant Dwight Carter who introduce Todd to the photographer Mel Dixon who give Todd his first job as his assistant. Todd started to work for other photographers. Harvey LLoyd working in audio visual with images and sounds and assisted and taught with his mentor and teacher Ernst Haas from 1972 to 1986, (Todd still consults to the Ernst Haas Estate). Working as a freelance photographer team up with the photographer Bob Day in 1973 to start Dove Studio, producing Audio/Visual presentation for museums, and corporations. In 1975 started Todd Weinstein Production working as a freelance photographer, and a producers of special projects for many clients. While always spending time keeping his personal work in tandem started using a Leica range finder camera with 35mm 400 high speed color negative film which was now available to work more spontaneously. Todd has lectured and taught in the US and abroad, published many articles, and won several awards and honors, including Artist-in-Residence, Germany for his project "Darkness into light: Re-emergence of Jewish Life in Germany".

One goal of "Darkness into Light" was to "add insight into the Jewish culture that is moving forward in post-Holocaust Germany." Mr. Weinstein's work on that project led to the more abstract "The Thirty-Six Unknown" (cf. Lamed vov-niks). In 1994, Todd Weinstein was invited by the German government to be an artist in residence in Germany. After the photographs from that period were developed, he picked up the many threads of his past experiences and began using the photographs toward a project on the re-emergence of Jewish culture in Germany. Most recently he produced a documentary titled Making Their Mark for the German Consulate General of New York. Focuses on German American heritage celebrating 400 years of Germans coming to America. He is the co founder of http://www.onclicknyc.com and PROSPEKT. Todd 30 year retrospective at the Detroit Holocaust Memorial Center in Detroit showed, his work on Jewish themes titled “Light Is My Voice” Images, Legends and Abstractions.

Todd was also one of the founders and became the director of the Union Square Gallery 1980- 1990. Todd changed the gallery the name to The Union Square Gallery Ernst Haas viewing Room after Ernst death in 1986. The Gallery showed many different artists: Louis Stettner, Sid Kaplan, Maggie Steber, Eugene Richards, Ed Grazda, Barry Kornbluh, Tore Johnson, Tom Braun, Arlene Gottfried, Carlos Rena Perez, Sid Kaplan, to name a few, and artists from Detroit MI.Europe as well an outside curator Greg Master. The gallery showed emerging and famous artists with a community spirit. Todd working as a street photography which he published titled "Personal journalism a Decade of Color Photography" 1980–1990 to celebrate 10 years of the Union Square gallery Ernst Haas viewing Room. Other books "The 36 Unknown" 2001 published by the founder Enrico Dagnino of pix4notes, Paris, France, “September 11th” 2002 published by pix4notes, Paris, France. Since the creation of the digital image making process, Todd is shooting with the a digital Canon and the newest IPhone. Todd is now working on a 50 retrospective “Stories Of Influence” In Search of One's own Voice, some dummy books, "The Prophets" and “Ice Angels”, and continues his teaching of workshops in the inspiration of his mentor and teacher the late Ernst Haas.
