= George Steiner =

French and American writer, literary critic and philosopher (1929–2020)

George Steiner FBA
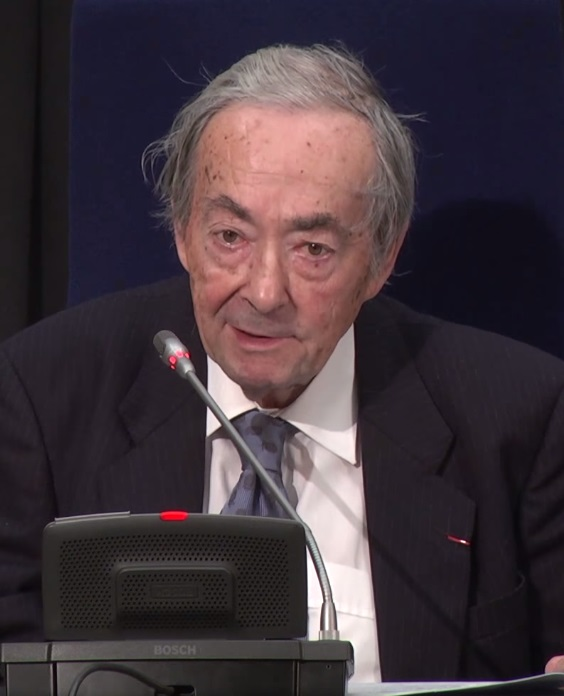
- Steiner speaking at the Nexus Institute, the Netherlands, 2013
- Born: Francis George Steiner; April 23, 1929; Neuilly-sur-Seine, France
- Died: February 3, 2020 (aged 90); Cambridge, England
- Education: University of Chicago (BA); Harvard University (MA); Balliol College, Oxford (DPhil)
- Occupations: Author; essayist; literary critic; professor
- Spouse: Zara Shakow (m. 1955)
- Children: 2
- Writing career
- Period: 1960–2014
- Genres: History, literature, literary fiction
- Notable work: After Babel (1975)
- Notable awards: Truman Capote Lifetime Achievement Award (1998)

Francis George Steiner, (April 23, 1929 – February 3, 2020) was a French and American literary critic, essayist, philosopher, novelist and educator. He wrote extensively about the relationship between language, literature and society, as well as the impact of the Holocaust. A 2001 article in The Guardian described Steiner as a "polyglot and polymath".

To his admirers, Steiner is "among the great minds in today's literary world". English novelist A. S. Byatt described him as a "late, late, late Renaissance man ... a European metaphysician with an instinct for the driving ideas of our time". Harriet Harvey-Wood, a former literature director of the British Council, described him as a "magnificent lecturer – prophetic and doom-laden [who would] turn up with half a page of scribbled notes, and never refer to them".

Steiner was Professor of English and Comparative Literature in the University of Geneva (1974–94), Professor of Comparative Literature and Fellow in the University of Oxford (1994–95), Professor of Poetry in Harvard University (2001–02) and an Extraordinary Fellow of Churchill College, Cambridge.

== Early life ==
Francis George Steiner was born on April 23, 1929, in Neuilly-sur-Seine, near the capital of France, Paris, to Viennese Jewish parents Else (née Franzos) and Frederick Georg Steiner. He had an elder sister, Ruth Lilian, who was born in Vienna in 1922. Else Steiner was a Viennese grande dame. Frederick Steiner had been a senior lawyer at Austria's central bank, the Oesterreichische Nationalbank; in Paris he was an investment banker.

Five years before Steiner's birth, his father had moved his family from Austria to France to escape the growing threat of anti-Semitism. He thought "Jews were endangered guests wherever they went, and wanted to equip his children [...] with languages to earn a living, the ability to pack a suitcase rather than a steamer trunk, and take joy in the adventure." Steiner grew up with three mother tongues: German, English, and French; his mother was multilingual and would often "begin a sentence in one language and end it in another".

When he was six years old, his father, who believed in the importance of classical education, taught him to read the Iliad in the original Greek. His mother, for whom "self-pity was nauseating", helped Steiner overcome a handicap he had been born with, a withered right arm. Instead of allowing him to become left-handed, she insisted he use his right hand as an able-bodied person would.

Steiner's first formal education took place at the Lycée Janson de Sailly in the 16th arrondissement of Paris. In 1940, during World War II, Steiner's father was in New York City on an economic mission for the French government when the Germans were preparing to invade France, and he got permission for his family to travel to New York. Steiner, his mother, and his sister Lilian, left by ship from Genoa. Within a month of their move, the Nazis occupied Paris, and of the many Jewish children in Steiner's class at school, he was one of only two who survived the war. Again his father's insight had saved his family, and this made Steiner feel like a survivor, which profoundly influenced his later writings. "My whole life has been about death, remembering and the Holocaust." Steiner became a "grateful wanderer", saying that "Trees have roots and I have legs; I owe my life to that." He spent the rest of his school years at the Lycée Français de New York in Manhattan, and became a United States citizen in 1944.

After high school, Steiner went to the University of Chicago, where he studied literature as well as mathematics and physics, and obtained a BA degree in 1948. This was followed by an MA degree from Harvard University in 1950. He then attended Balliol College, Oxford, on a Rhodes Scholarship.

== Career ==
From 1956 to 1958, Steiner was a scholar at the Institute for Advanced Study in Princeton, New Jersey. He also held a Fulbright professorship in Innsbruck, Austria, from 1958 to 1959. In 1959, he was appointed Gauss Lecturer at Princeton, where he lectured for another two years. He then became a founding fellow of Churchill College, Cambridge in 1961. Steiner was initially not well received at Cambridge by the English faculty. Some disapproved of this charismatic "firebrand with a foreign accent" and questioned the relevance of the Holocaust he constantly referred to in his lectures. Bryan Cheyette, professor of 20th-century literature at the University of Southampton said that at the time, "Britain [...] didn't think it had a relationship to the Holocaust; its mythology of the war was rooted in the Blitz, Dunkirk, the Battle of Britain." While Steiner received a professorial salary, he was never made a full professor at Cambridge with the right to examine. He had the option of leaving for professorships in the United States, but Steiner's father objected, saying that Hitler, who said no one bearing their name would be left in Europe, would then have won. Steiner remained in England because "I'd do anything rather than face such contempt from my father." He was elected an Extraordinary Fellow of Churchill College in 1969.

After several years as a freelance writer and occasional lecturer, Steiner accepted the post of Professor of English and Comparative Literature at the University of Geneva in 1974; he held this post for 20 years, teaching in four languages. He lived by Goethe's maxim that "no monoglot truly knows his own language". He became professor emeritus in the University of Geneva upon his retirement in 1994 and an Honorary Fellow of Balliol College, Oxford, in 1995. He also held the positions of the first Lord Weidenfeld Professor of Comparative European Literature and Fellow of St Anne's College, Oxford, from 1994 to 1995, and Norton Professor of Poetry at Harvard University from 2001 to 2002.

Steiner was called "an intelligent and intellectual critic and essayist". He was active on undergraduate publications while at the University of Chicago and later became a regular contributor of reviews and articles to many journals and newspapers including The Times Literary Supplement and The Guardian. He wrote for The New Yorker for over thirty years, contributing over two hundred reviews.

While Steiner generally took things very seriously, he also revealed an unexpected deadpan humor: when he was once asked if he had ever read anything trivial as a child, he replied, Moby-Dick.

== Views ==
Steiner was regarded as a polymath and is often credited with having recast the role of the critic by having explored art and thought unbounded by national frontiers or academic disciplines. He advocated generalisation over specialisation, and insisted that the notion of being literate must encompass knowledge of both arts and sciences. Steiner believed that nationalism is too inherently violent to satisfy the moral prerogative of Judaism, having said "that because of what we are, there are things we can't do".

Among Steiner's non-traditional views, in his autobiography titled Errata (1997), Steiner related his sympathetic stance towards the use of brothels since his college years at the University of Chicago. As Steiner stated, "My virginity offended Alfie (his college room-mate). He found it ostentatious and vaguely corrupt in a nineteen-year-old... He sniffed the fear in me with disdain. And marched me off to Cicero, Illinois, a town justly ill famed but, by virtue of its name, reassuring to me. There he organized, with casual authority, an initiation as thorough as it was gentle. It is this unlikely gentleness, the caring under circumstances so outwardly crass, that blesses me still."

Central to Steiner's thinking, he stated, "is my astonishment, naïve as it seems to people, that you can use human speech both to love, to build, to forgive, and also to torture, to hate, to destroy and to annihilate."

Steiner received criticism and support for his views that racism is inherent in everyone and that tolerance is only skin deep. He is reported to have said: "It's very easy to sit here, in this room, and say 'racism is horrible'. But ask me the same thing if a Jamaican family moved next door with six children and they play reggae and rock music all day. Or if an estate agent comes to my house and tells me that because a Jamaican family has moved next door the value of my property has fallen through the floor. Ask me then!"

== Works ==
Steiner's literary career spanned half a century. He published original essays and books that address the anomalies of contemporary Western culture, issues of language and its "debasement" in the post-Holocaust age. His field was primarily comparative literature, and his work as a critic tended toward exploring cultural and philosophical issues, particularly dealing with translation and the nature of language and literature.

Steiner's first published book was Tolstoy or Dostoevsky: An Essay in Contrast (1960), which was a study of the different ideas and ideologies of the Russian writers Leo Tolstoy and Fyodor Dostoevsky. The Death of Tragedy (1961) originated as his doctoral thesis at the University of Oxford and examined literature from the ancient Greeks to the mid-20th century. His best-known book, After Babel (1975), was an early and influential contribution to the field of translation studies. It was adapted for television as The Tongues of Men (1977), and was the inspiration behind the creation in 1983 of the English avant-rock group News from Babel.

Works of literary fiction by Steiner include four short story collections, Anno Domini: Three Stories (1964), Proofs and Three Parables (1992), The Deeps of the Sea (1996), and A cinq heures de l'après-midi (2008); and his controversial novella, The Portage to San Cristobal of A.H. (1981). Portage to San Cristobal, in which Jewish Nazi hunters find Adolf Hitler (the "A.H." of the novella's title) alive in the Amazon jungle thirty years after the end of World War II, explored ideas about the origins of European anti-semitism first expounded by Steiner in his critical work In Bluebeard's Castle (1971). Steiner has suggested that Nazism was Europe's revenge on the Jews for inventing conscience. Cheyette sees Steiner's fiction as "an exploratory space where he can think against himself". It "contrasts its humility and openness with his increasingly closed and orthodox critical work". Central to it is the survivor's "terrible, masochistic envy about not being there – having missed the rendezvous with hell".

No Passion Spent (1996) is a collection of essays on topics as diverse as Kierkegaard, Homer in translation, Biblical texts, and Freud's dream theory. Errata: An Examined Life (1997) is a semi-autobiography, and Grammars of Creation (2001), based on Steiner's 1990 Gifford Lectures delivered at the University of Glasgow, explores a range of subjects from cosmology to poetry. Steiner's last book, A Long Saturday: Conversations, was written with Laure Adler; it was published in French in 2014 and in English in 2017.

== Personal life ==
After his doctoral thesis at Oxford, a draft of The Death of Tragedy (later published by Faber and Faber), was rejected, Steiner took time off from his studies to teach English at Williams College and to work as leader writer for the London-based weekly publication The Economist between 1952 and 1956. It was during this time that he met Zara Shakow, a New Yorker of Lithuanian descent. She had also studied at Harvard and they met in London at the suggestion of their former professors. "The professors had had a bet ... that we would get married if we ever met." They married in 1955, the year he received his DPhil from Oxford University. They had a son, David Steiner (who served as New York State's Commissioner of Education from 2009 to 2011) and a daughter, Deborah Steiner (Professor of Classics at Columbia University). He last lived in Cambridge, England. He died at home on February 3, 2020, at the age of 90, and Zara Steiner died from pneumonia ten days later.

== Awards and honors ==
George Steiner received many honors, including:

- A Rhodes Scholarship (1950)
- A Guggenheim Fellowship (1970/1971)
- Chevalier de la Légion d'Honneur by the French Government (1984)
- The Morton Dauwen Zabel Prize from The American Academy of Arts and Letters (1989)
- The King Albert Medal by the Belgian Academy Council of Applied Sciences
- An honorary fellow of Balliol College, Oxford (1995)
- The Truman Capote Lifetime Achievement Award by Stanford University (1998)
- The Prince of Asturias Award for Communication and Humanities (2001)
- Fellowship of the British Academy (1998)
- Honorary Fellow of the Royal Academy of Arts
- Honorary Doctorate of Literature degrees from:
  - University of East Anglia (1976)
  - University of Leuven (1980)
  - Mount Holyoke College (1983)
  - Bristol University (1989)
  - University of Glasgow (1990)
  - University of Liège (1990)
  - University of Ulster (1993)
  - Durham University (1995)
  - University of Salamanca (2002)
  - Queen Mary University of London (2006)
  - Alma Mater Studiorum – Università di Bologna (2006)
  - Honoris Causa – Faculty of Letters – University of Lisbon (2009)

He has also won numerous awards for his fiction and poetry, including:

- Remembrance Award (1974) for Language and Silence: Essays 1958–1966.
- PEN/Macmillan Silver Pen Award (1992) for Proofs and Three Parables.
- PEN/Macmillan Fiction Prize (1993) for Proofs and Three Parables.
- JQ Wingate Prize for Non-Fiction (joint winner with Louise Kehoe and Silvia Rodgers) (1997) for No Passion Spent.

== Sources ==
- Averil Condren, Papers of George Steiner, Churchill Archives Centre, 2001
- The Harvard Gazette (27.09.01)
