= United Nations Security Council Resolution 1535 =

UN Security Council Resolution 1535
- Date: 26 March 2004
- Meeting no.: 4,936
- Code: S/RES/1535 (Document)
- Subject: Threats to international peace and security caused by terrorist acts
- Voting summary: 15 voted for; None voted against; None abstained
- Result: Adopted

Security Council composition
- Permanent members: China; France; Russia; United Kingdom; United States
- Non-permanent members: Algeria; Angola; Benin; Brazil; Chile; Germany; Pakistan; Philippines; Romania; Spain

United Nations Security Council resolution 1535, adopted unanimously on 26 March 2004, after reaffirming resolutions 1373 (2001), 1377 (2001) and 1456 (2003), the council restructured the Counter-Terrorism Committee to enhance the implementation of anti-terrorism measures.

== Resolution ==
=== Observations ===
The Security Council reaffirmed that terrorism constituted a threat to international peace and security, and was determined to combat terrorism according to the United Nations Charter. It reminded states that steps taken to combat terrorism had to be in accordance with international law, and urged countries to become party to international conventions and protocols relating to terrorism.

The preamble of the resolution also welcomed progress made by the Counter-Terrorism Committee in monitoring the implementation of Resolution 1373. It highlighted the role of international, regional and subregional organisations in fighting terrorism. Meanwhile, the council noted that some states required assistance in implementing Resolution 1373 and the need for the committee to visit countries to monitor the resolution's implementation.

=== Acts ===
The Security Council decided that the committee would consist of the "Plenary" composed of the Security Council's member states and the "Bureau", assisted by the Counter-Terrorism Committee Executive Directorate (CTED) as a special political mission with an initial mandate until 31 December 2007. The CTED would be responsible for ensuring the follow-up of all of the committee's decisions; facilitating the provision of assistance to states in order to further their implementation of Resolution 1373; and supervising the collection of all appropriate information in following up implementation, among others.

The resolution instructed the Executive Director of the CTED to submit a plan for the CTED, which the chairman was requested to bring to the Security Council for endorsement. It concluded by stressing the importance of the effective functioning of the committee and for it to regularly report on its progress.

== See also ==
- Anti-terrorism legislation
- Counter-terrorism
- List of terrorist incidents
- List of United Nations Security Council Resolutions 1501 to 1600 (2003–2005)
