= James Weinstein (legal scholar) =

American legal scholar

James Weinstein is an American legal scholar who holds the Dan Cracchiolo Chair in Constitutional Law at the Sandra Day O'Connor College of Law at Arizona State University. He is a defender of the American form of free speech and opposes laws banning hate speech.
