= Alain Veinstein =

French poet and writer

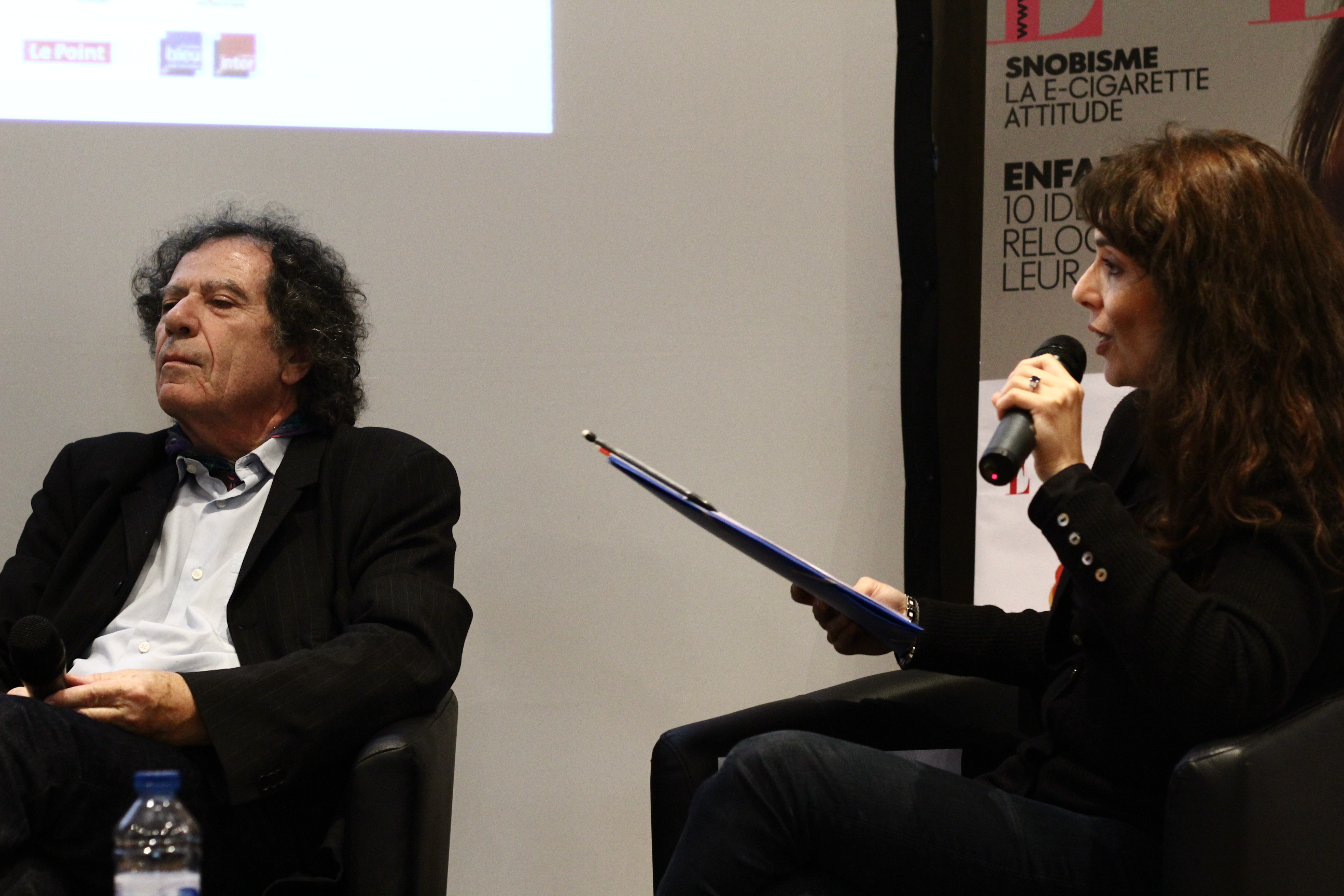
- Alain Veinstein with Karine Papillaud in 2013
- Born: 17 August 1942 (age 83) Cannes, France
- Notable awards: Mallarmé prize
- Spouse: Laure Adler

Alain Veinstein (born 17 August 1942) is a poet and writer, winner of the Mallarmé prize and a host and producer of radio.

== Biography ==
Since 1978, Alain Veinstein is also the voice of the nights of France Culture with interviews on the program Du jour au lendemain, which ran from 1985 to 2014, and broadcasts, Surprised by the night, and surprised by the poetry. He created "The magnetic Nights" in 1978.

He interviewed Marguerite Duras.

Veinstein is essayist Laure Adler's husband.

== Works ==
=== Fiction ===
- L'accordeur. Calmann-Lévy. 1996. ISBN 978-2-7021-2577-9. (The Piano Tuner). Calmann-Levy (1996) – "The narrator, who never knew his father, was raised by his grandfather, a dark and quiet man who worked as a gravedigger. When, in turn it becomes father words intended for his son missed. A novel about the incompatibility between human beings and on the descent.
- The Interviewer. Calmann-Levy (2002) – "The interviewer is a radio presenter for a literary program, viewers of all these writers. A day to force the speeches too well prepared, it feels to unlearn any language not to hear or understand ... "
- Violante. Mercure de France. 2001. ISBN 978-2-07-041459-8. "The life of a Parisian art dealer in the Rue de Lappe somewhat disillusioned.
- La partition: roman. Grasset. 2004. ISBN 978-2-246-65171-0. (The Score). Grasset and Folio (2006) – "The man that I hardly ever approached in the flesh, I have always regarded as a kind of monster, a butcher ..."
- Dancing. The threshold then Folio (2006) – "The Story of a man who decides, after having spent years writing enclosed within four walls, to take his life last arm to the waist."

=== Non Fiction ===
- Henri Thomas; Alain Veinstein (2004). Les heures lentes: entretiens sur France-Culture avec Alain Veinstein. Arléa. ISBN 978-2-86959-662-7.

=== Poetry ===
- Répétition sur les amas. Mercure de France. 1974.
- From a reader's notebook. Annex Press. 1984.
- Archeology of the mother. Translated by Rosmarie Waldrop; Tod Kabza. Spectacular Diseases. 1986.
- Even a child. Translated by Robert Kocik; Rosmarie Waldrop. Burning Deck. 1997. ISBN 978-1-886224-28-5.
- Voix Seule. Seuil. 2011. ISBN 978-2-02-104702-8.

=== Anthologies ===
- Michel Décaudin; Jean-Baptiste Para, eds. (2000). Anthologie de la poésie française du XXe siècle. Gallimard. ISBN 978-2-07-041302-7.
- Paul Auster, ed. (1984). The Random House book of twentieth-century French poetry. Vintage Books.
