= Anti-terrorism legislation =

Laws enacted against terrorism

Anti-terrorism legislation are laws aimed at fighting terrorism. They usually, if not always, follow specific bombings or assassinations. Anti-terrorism legislation usually includes specific amendments allowing the state to bypass its own legislation when fighting terrorism-related crimes, under alleged grounds of necessity.

Because of this suspension of regular procedure, such legislation is sometimes criticized as a form of lois scélérates which may unjustly repress all kinds of popular protests. Critics often allege that anti-terrorism legislation endangers democracy by creating a state of exception that allows authoritarian style of government.

Although some legal scholars have long expressed concern that the wording of anti-terrorism laws would allow them to be used against non-violent direct action protestors, the proscription of UK-based direct action group Palestine Action was described by one expert as "unprecedented". In some countries, direct action is expressly excluded from the definition of terrorism.

== International conventions related to terrorism and counter-terrorism cases ==
Terrorism has been on the international agenda since 1934, when the League of Nations, predecessor of the United Nations, began the elaboration of a convention for the prevention and punishment of terrorism. Although the convention was eventually adopted in 1937, it never came into force.

Today, there are 15 counter-terrorism international conventions in force. They were developed under the auspices of the United Nations and its specialized agencies and the International Atomic Energy Agency (IAEA). Moreover, on 8 September 2006, the UN General Assembly adopted a "Global Counter-Terrorism Strategy".

=== Conventions open to all states ===
- 1963 Convention on Offences and Certain Other Acts Committed On Board Aircraft (Tokyo Convention)
- 1970 Convention for the Suppression of Unlawful Seizure of Aircraft (Hague Convention)
- 1971 Convention for the Suppression of Unlawful Acts Against the Safety of Civil Aviation (Sabotage Convention or Montreal Convention)
- 1973 Convention on the Prevention and Punishment of Crimes Against Internationally Protected Persons (Diplomatic Agents Convention)
- 1979 International Convention against the Taking of Hostages (Hostages Convention)
- 1980 Convention on the Physical Protection of Nuclear Material (Nuclear Materials Convention)
- 1988 Protocol for the Suppression of Unlawful Acts of Violence at Airports Serving International Civil Aviation (Airport Protocol)
- 1988 Convention for the Suppression of Unlawful Acts Against the Safety of Maritime Navigation (Maritime Convention)
- 1988 Protocol for the Suppression of Unlawful Acts Against the Safety of Fixed Platforms Located on the Continental Shelf (Fixed Platform Protocol)
- 1991 Convention on the Marking of Plastic Explosives for the Purpose of Detection (Plastic Explosives Convention)
- 1997 International Convention for the Suppression of Terrorist Bombings (Terrorist Bombing Convention)
- 1999 International Convention for the Suppression of the Financing of Terrorism (Terrorist Financing Convention)
- 2005 International Convention for the Suppression of Acts of Nuclear Terrorism (Nuclear Terrorism Convention)
- 2010 Convention on the Suppression of Unlawful Acts Relating to International Civil Aviation (Beijing Convention)
- 2010 Protocol Supplementary to the Convention for the Suppression of Unlawful Seizure of Aircraft (Beijing Protocol)

A 16th international convention, a proposed Comprehensive Convention on International Terrorism, is currently under negotiations.

=== Security Council Resolutions ===
- UN Security Council Resolution 731 (January 21, 1992)
- UN Security Council Resolution 748 (March 31, 1992)
- UN Security Council Resolution 883 (November 11, 1993)
- September 28, 2001 United Nations Security Council Resolution 1373 adopted under Chapter VII of the United Nations Charter, which makes it legally binding to member states. Among other provisions, it favored the exchange of intelligence between member states and legislative reforms. It established the United Nations Security Council Counter-Terrorism Committee (CTC) to monitor state compliance with its provisions. Later resolutions concerning the same matter were UNSC resolutions 1390, 1456, 1535 (which restructured the CTC), 1566, and 1624.

=== Regional conventions ===
==== Europe ====
- 1977 European Convention on the Suppression of Terrorism (Strasbourg, January 1977)
- 2003 Protocol (Strasbourg, May 2003)
- 2005 Council of Europe Convention on the Prevention of Terrorism

==== Commonwealth of Independent States ====
- Treaty on Cooperation among States Members of the Commonwealth of Independent States in Combating Terrorism (Minsk, June 1999)

==== The Americas ====
- Organisation of American States Convention to Prevent and Punish Acts of Terrorism Taking the Form of Crimes Against Persons and Related Extortion that are of International Significance (Washington, D.C. February 1971)
- Inter-American Convention Against Terrorism AG/RES. 1840 (XXXII-O/02) (Bridgetown, June 2002)

==== Africa ====
- Organisation of African Union Convention on the Prevention and Combating of Terrorism (Algiers July 1999) and the Protocol to that Convention, Addis Ababa July 2004) [as of 30 August 2005 the Protocol was not yet in force]

==== Asia ====
- SAARC Regional Convention on Suppression of Terrorism (Kathmandu, November 1987)
- Additional Protocol to the convention, Islamabad, January 2004 [As of 30 August 2005 not yet in force].
- The ASEAN Convention On Counter Terrorism, Cebu, Philippines, 13 January 2007 [In force from 27 May 2011, on 22 January 2013 all ASEAN members signed the ACCT]

==== South Korea ====
- Act on prohibition against the financing of terrorism (February 29, 2008)

→(rev)Act on prohibition against the financing of terrorism and proliferation of weapons of mass destruction (March 29, 2016)

- Act on anti-terrorism for the protection of citizens and public security (March 3, 2016)

==== League of Arab States ====
- Arab Convention on the Suppression of Terrorism (Cairo, April 1998)

==== Organization of the Islamic Conference ====
- Convention of the Organization of the Islamic Conference on Combating International Terrorism (Ouagadougou, July 1999)

== Anti-terrorist legislation in the European Union ==
=== European Union ===
- EU Framework Decision on Terrorism
- EU Directive 2017/541 on combating terrorism

=== European Court of Human Rights cases related to anti-terrorist legislation ===
- Anna Maroufidou v. Sweden - 1981
- Brogan and others v. the UK - 11209/84;11234/84;11266/84;... [1988] ECHR 24 (29 November 1988)

=== Belgium ===
- Belgium Anti-Terrorism Act 2003

=== France ===
France has passed a variety of anti-terrorist laws, the first of which being the 19th-century lois scélérates restricting freedom of expression. Today, magistrates in the Justice Ministry anti-terrorism unit have authority to detain people suspected of "conspiracy in relation to terrorism" while evidence is gathered against them.

=== Ireland ===
- Offences against the State Acts 1939–1998 via the Special Criminal Court
- Criminal Justice (Terrorist Offences) Act 2005

=== Italy ===
Italy passed various anti-terrorist laws during the "Years of Lead" (anni di piombo) in the 1970s.

The Reale Act was adopted on 22 May 1975. It allowed the police to carry out searches and arrest persons without being mandated by an investigative judge. Interrogation could take place without the presence of a lawyer. Critics underlined that this contradicted article 3 of the Constitution on equality before the law.

Preventive detention was fixed before 1970 to two years, for a possible sentence going between 20 years to perpetuity, while it was limited to one year for charges of crimes leading to a sentence of less than 20 years. It passed to four years after 1970. A decree-law of 11 April 1974 authorized a four-year detention until the first judgment, six years until the appeal, and eight years until the definitive judgment. In case of indictment for "acts of terrorism," the preventive detention was extended to twelve years.

The Cossiga decree-law was passed on 15 December 1979. It prolonged the length of preventive detention relative to terrorism suspicions and allowed wiretaps. Critics have pointed out that this violated articles 15 and 27 of the Constitution. The Cossiga decree-law also created the status of pentito (officially "collaborators of justice"): those accused of terrorism crimes and who accepted of confessing them and of informing the authorities about their accomplices could be liberated.

Law n°191 of May 21, 1978, called "Moro law", and law n°15 of February 6, 1980, were ratifications by the assembly of decrees of emergency enacted by the executive power, respectively on March 28, 1978, and on December 15, 1979.

=== United Kingdom ===
- Prevention of Terrorism Acts (Northern Ireland), 1974–89
- Terrorism Act 2000
- Anti-terrorism, Crime and Security Act 2001 (the Racial and Religious Hatred Act was supposed to be part of it as provisions, but it was dropped)
- The Prevention of Terrorism Act 2005 was intended to deal with the Law Lords' ruling of 16 December 2004, that the detention without trial of nine foreigners at HM Prison Belmarsh under Part IV of the Anti-terrorism, Crime and Security Act 2001 was unlawful, being incompatible with the European Convention on Human Rights. It was given Royal assent on 11 March 2005. The Act allows the Home Secretary to impose "control orders" on people they suspect of involvement in terrorism, which in some cases may derogate (opt out) from human rights laws. In April 2006, a High Court judge issued a declaration that section 3 of the Act was incompatible with the right to a fair trial under article 6 of the European Convention on Human Rights. The Act was described by Mr Justice Sullivan as an 'affront to justice'. Amnesty International, Human Rights Watch, JUSTICE and Liberty have opposed it. Criticism of the Act included complaints about the range of restrictions that could be imposed, the use of closed proceedings and special advocates to hear secret evidence against the detainee, and the possibility that evidence against detainees may include evidence obtained in other countries by torture.
- The Terrorism Act 2006 increased the limit of pre-charge detention for terrorist suspects to 28 days after a rebellion by Labour MPs. Originally, the Government, and Prime Minister Tony Blair, had pushed for a 90-day detention period, but this was reduced to 28 days after a vote in the House of Commons. Home Office Minister Damian Green announced on 20 January 2011 that the period would revert to 14 days as the order extending the period to 28 days would be allowed to lapse at midnight on 24 January.
- The Counter-Terrorism Act 2008, a section of which would have controversially increased the limit of pre-charge detention for terrorism suspects for 42 days. This measure was dropped from the bill after it failed to win approval in the House of Lords.
- Terrorist Asset-Freezing (Temporary Provisions) Act 2010, which led to the
- Terrorist Asset-Freezing etc. Act 2010
- Terrorism Prevention and Investigation Measures Act 2011 received royal assent on 14 December that year.
- Counter-Terrorism and Security Act 2015

UK anti-terrorism legislation is subject to regular review by the Independent Reviewer of Terrorism Legislation.

== Anti-terrorism legislation in common law countries (other than the UK) ==
=== Australia ===
- Australian anti-terrorism legislation, 2004
- Australian Anti-Terrorism Act 2005

The Civil Rights Network opposes such legislation. Elizabeth Evatt, a federal judge, has criticized John Howard's 2005 anti-terrorism bill, particularly provisions relating to control orders and preventive detention, saying that "These laws are striking at the most fundamental freedoms in our democracy in a most draconian way."

=== Bangladesh ===
- The Anti-Terrorism Act, 2009 applied retrospectively from 11 June 2008.

=== Canada ===
- Canadian Anti-Terrorism Act, 2001
- Bill S-7, the Combating Terrorism Act, 2012
- Bill C-51, the Anti-terrorism Act, 2015

=== India ===
- Terrorist and Disruptive Activities (Prevention) Act (1985–1995)
- Prevention of Terrorism Act, 2002 (2002–2004)
- Unlawful Activities (Prevention) Act

=== New Zealand ===
- Terrorism Suppression Act 2002

=== Pakistan ===
- Suppression of Terrorist Activities Ordinance, 1975 enacted by Zulfikar Ali Bhutto. The law remained in force in the Sindh Province and the Punjab Province until its repeal in 1997, and remained the law in the North West Frontier Province (NWFP) and Baluchistan until August 2001.
- 1997 Anti-Terrorism Act, signed on August 17, 1997, by then Prime Minister Nawaz Sharif. The law, which included a broad definition of "terrorism", was enacted after a January 1997 bombing by Mehram Ali, a member of the Shia militant organization Tehrik Nifaz Fiqh-i-Jafaria (TNFJ). The Anti-Terrorism Act created specials Anti-Terrorism Courts (ATC) as well as an Anti-Terrorism Appellate (ATA) Tribunal. Merham Ali was subsequently tried before those special courts, but made an appeal to the Supreme Court, which confirmed his death sentence, but declared most of the 1997 Anti-Terrorism Act unconstitutional.
- 24 October 1998 Anti-Terrorism (Amendment) Ordinance issued by Nawaz Sharif's government to respond to most of the Supreme Court's objections. According to political scientist Charles H. Kennedy, "Special Anti-Terrorism courts remained in place but the judges of such courts were granted tenure of office (two years, later extended to two and one-half years); the special Appellate Tribunals were disbanded, appeals against the decisions of the Anti-Terrorism courts would henceforth be to the respective High Courts; and restrictions were placed on the earlier act's provisions regarding trial in absentia to accord with regular legal procedures."
- Pakistan Armed Forces (Acting in Aid of Civil Power) Ordinance, 1998. Applying itself to the Sindh Province, the ordinance granted broad judicial powers to the military. It also created the new crime of "civil commotion," which exposed to a penalty of 7 firm prison years. The ordinance defined "civil commotion" as

"creation of internal disturbances in violation of law or intended to violate law, commencement or continuation of illegal strikes, go-slows, lock-outs, vehicle snatching/lifting, damage to or destruction of State or private property, random firing to create panic, charging bhatha

[protection money/extortion], acts of criminal trespass, distributing, publishing or pasting of a handbill or making graffiti

or wall-chalking intended to create unrest or fear or create a threat to the security of law and order..."

- 30 January 1999: the Pakistan Armed Forces Ordinance of 1998 is extended to the whole country. It was also amended to enable "absconders" from justice to be tried in absentia by any military court. The opposition filed many constitutional petitions challenging the validity of the ordinance, resulting in Liaquat Hussain versus Federation of Pakistan issued on 22 February 1999. The Supreme Court declared the ordinance "unconstitutional, without legal authority, and with no legal effect.". It rejected Nawaz Sharif's claim that the ordinance was temporary and limited to Sindh Province.
- 27 April 1999: repeal of the Armed Forces (Acting in Aid of Civil Power) ordinance. However, "civil commotion" is included as a crime under the Anti-Terrorism Act of 1997.
- 27 August 1999: amendment to the Anti-Terrorism Act, authorizing ATC (Anti Terrorism Court) in all of the country.

=== Russia ===
- Yarovaya law

In 2017 Ukraine opened a case against Russia for involvement and financing of military-occupied Autonomous Republic of Crimea and part of Donbas.

=== South Africa ===
- South African Terrorism Act No 83 of 1967
- Anti-Terrorism Bill (Bill as approved by the Parliamentary Portfolio Committee for Safety & Security on 2003/11/13)
- Protection of Constitutional Democracy Against Terrorism & Related Activities Act, 2004

=== United States ===
==== Federal ====
- Biological Weapons Anti-Terrorism Act of 1989
- Executive Order 12947 signed by President Bill Clinton Jan. 23, 1995, Prohibiting Transactions With Terrorists Who Threaten To Disrupt the Middle East Peace Process, and later expanded to include freezing the assets of Osama bin Laden and others.
- Omnibus Counterterrorism Act of 1995
- US Antiterrorism and Effective Death Penalty Act of 1996 (see also the LaGrand case which opposed in 1999-2001 Germany to the US in the International Court of Justice concerning a German citizen convicted of armed robbery and murder, and sentenced to death)
- Executive Order 13224, signed by President George W. Bush Sept. 23, 2001, among other things, authorizes the seizure of assets of organizations or individuals designated by the Secretary of the Treasury to assist, sponsor, or provide material or financial support or who are otherwise associated with terrorists. 66 Fed. Reg. 49,079 (Sept. 23, 2001).
- 2001 Uniting and Strengthening America by Providing Appropriate Tools for Intercepting and Obstructing Terrorism Act (USA Patriot Act)(amended March 2006) (the Financial Anti-Terrorism Act was integrated to it)
- Homeland Security Act of 2002, Pub. L. 107–296.
- Border Protection, Anti-terrorism, and Illegal Immigration Control Act of 2005
- Real ID Act of 2005
- Military Commissions Act of 2006
- Animal Enterprise Terrorism Act of 2006

==== Ohio ====
- Ohio Patriot Act

== Anti-terrorism legislation in civil law countries (outside the European Union) ==
=== China ===
China passed Counterterrorism Law on December 27, 2015.

The Anti-terrorism Law has 10 chapters and 97 articles, taking effect on January 1, 2016. Before the promulgation of Anti-terrorism Law, though anti-terrorism laws can be found in the Criminal Law or some other emergency action regulations, there was not a systematic legal structure or source for anti-terrorism actions.

The most controversial provisions of the Anti-terrorism Law are the numerous new restrictions on the operation of internet and technology based companies, among which Article 21 says that an internet operator or provider is obligated to verify the identity of each user and shall refuse to provide services to a user who refuses such verification or fails to provide a clear identity. Any company who fails to meet such obligation may face fines, orders of rectification and its management and executives may face fines and even detentions from 5 to 15 days. In addition, Article 18 says any telecommunication operator or internet provider shall provide technology access and source code or other de-encryption support and assistance for the purposes of preventing and investigating terrorism by Public Safety Department or National Security Department.

=== Chile ===
Human Rights Watch has criticized the Chilean government for inappropriately using anti-terrorist legislation against Mapuche groups involved in land conflicts. While the legislation in question was originally enacted by the Pinochet dictatorship, the democratic governments that have followed have actually increased its severity. Human Rights Watch has expressed special concern that the current version of the law lists arson as a "terrorist" offence. This has allowed the application of the law against Mapuche vandals. While recognizing that crimes have certainly been committed, the international organization believes that they are not comparable to terrorist acts. In 2018, Amnesty International urged Chile to stop utilizing the Anti-Terrorism Law to prosecute Mapuche dissidents affirmed all people's right to a fair trial.

=== El Salvador ===
El Salvador, presided by Antonio Saca of the right-wing ARENA party, had adopted in September 2006 an anti-terrorist law. All major parties, including the FMLN, have criticized the law, claiming it could be used against social movements

The government first attempted to use the law against illegal street vendors who violently resisted removal by the police. These charges did not result in convictions.

In July 2007, the Salvadoran government charged fourteen people with acts of terrorism for their participation and/or association with a demonstration against privatization of the nation's water system. Charges were dismissed against one of those arrested. The remainder, known as the Suchitito 13, were released, but continued to face charges under the Special Law Against Terrorist Acts. The charges were reduced to "disorderly conduct" in early February 2008 and then completely dropped later in the month.

=== Israel ===
Many years Israel has relied on mandatory regulations as a legal basis for fighting terrorism and for convicting terrorists both in civilian and military courts. In 2016, after a long and thorough work by the Minister of Justice Ayelet Shaked, the Knesset passed a comprehensive law against terrorism, forbidding any kind of terrorism and support of terrorism, and setting severe punishments for terrorists. The law also regulates legal efforts against terrorism.

=== Peru ===
Peru adopted anti-terrorist laws in 1992, under Alberto Fujimori's presidency. The laws were criticized by Amnesty International, who declared in its 2002 report that "Detainees falsely charged with 'terrorism-related' offences in previous years remained held. 'Anti-terrorism' legislation which had resulted in unfair trials since its introduction in 1992 remained in force. Members of the security forces accused of human rights violations continued to have their cases transferred to military courts." Lori Berenson, a US citizen serving a 20-year prison term in Peru, has been condemned in virtue of these laws, on charges of collaboration with the Túpac Amaru Revolutionary Movement.

=== Philippines ===
The Human Security Act of 2007, signed into law by President Gloria Macapagal Arroyo and effective since July 2007, officially aimed at tackling militants in the southern Philippines, including the Abu Sayyaf group, which has links to al-Qaeda and has been blamed for bombings and kidnappings in the region. Under the law, three days of warrantless detention are authorized, although arresting officers are obliged to immediately inform a judge about the arrest. Furthermore, detained suspects are entitled to see a lawyer, a priest, a doctor, or family members. The law allows eavesdropping on suspects as well as access to bank accounts for authorities. Convictions could result in 40-year prison sentences, but compensations are provided for in case of miscarriage of justice. Terrorism was defined by Section 3 as "sowing and creating a condition of widespread and extraordinary fear and panic among the populace in order to coerce the government to give in to an unlawful demand", a formulation criticized by Wilson Fortaleza, national president and third nominee of the labor party-list group Sanlakas, who claimed the law could be used to crush political dissent.

Human rights group Karapatan said that "Under Marcos Jr., the Anti-Terrorism Act of 2020 and the Terrorism Financing Prevention and Suppression Act of 2012 have been aggressively enforced not to protect the public, but to persecute critics and suppress dissent". Human Rights Watch had previously criticized the Anti-Terrorism Act signed by President Rodrigo Duterte in 2020, describing the law as a "human rights disaster in the making" that opens the door to "arbitrary arrests and long prison sentences for people or representatives of organizations that have displeased the president". In 2026, journalist Frenchie Mae Cumpio and activist Marielle Domequil were convicted of financing terrorism. Press freedom advocates described the conviction as a "travesty of justice".

=== Indonesia ===
Following the October 2002 Bali bombings, Indonesia adopted Government Regulation in Lieu of Law 1/2002. Under the Indonesian legal system, a Government Regulation in Lieu of Law has the same power as a parliament-enacted legislation, except that it can only be issued under emergency circumstances and is subject to review by the next parliamentary session. Nevertheless, Indonesian Parliament enacted this emergency regulation into Law 15/2003. As since, Indonesia has an anti-terror legislation with strong political support. The Anti-Terror Law cultivates many criticism, however. The Law contained provisions which can circumvent normal criminal proceeding such as quick and long detention. One of the main contentious provision of the Law is that it allows Intelligence Information to be used as a preliminary evidence that can be used for apprehending a suspect. The role of Intelligence Information as evidence has been a subject of hot debate in Indonesia.

=== Turkey ===
Article 8 of the Anti-Terror Law (Law 3713; April 1991), slightly amended in 1995 and later repealed, imposed three-year prison sentences for "separatist propaganda." Despite its name, the Anti-Terror Law punished many non-violent offences. Pacifists have been imprisoned under Article 8. For example, publisher Fatih Tas was prosecuted in 2002 under Article 8 at Istanbul State Security Court for translating and publishing writings by Noam Chomsky, summarizing the history of the human rights of Kurdish people in Turkey; he was acquitted, however, in February 2002.

State Security Courts were transformed into Heavy Penal Courts following June 2004 reforms to the 1982 Constitution, enacted following the 1980 military coup.

As of 2008, detainees arrested under the Anti-Terror Law have access to lawyers at the very beginning of their detention.

== Ukraine ==
In 2017 Ukraine opened a case against Russia for involvement and financing of military occupied Autonomous Republic of Crimea and part of Donbas.

== Anti Terrorist Act, 2009 passed in Bangladesh ==
This act is effective from 11 June 2008. Under section 28 of this Act, anti terrorist special Tribunal is trying the crimes.

== See also ==
- Anti-Socialist Laws passed in Germany in 1878
- Criticism of the war on terror
- High policing
- Incitement to terrorism
- National security
- Rule of law
- State of emergency
