= Proliferation Security Initiative =

Global initiative to stop trafficking of weapons of mass destruction

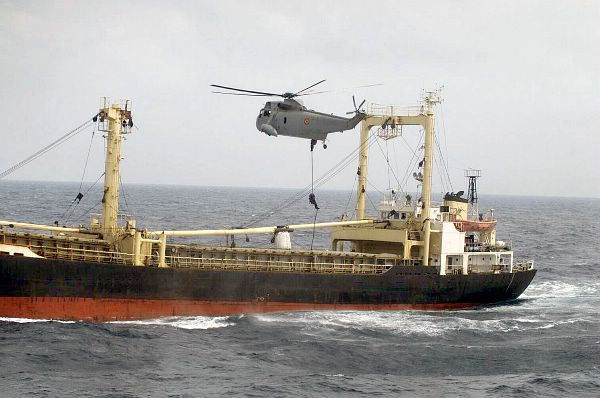
So San assault by Spanish special forces; see "Interdictions and Events" section below.

The Proliferation Security Initiative (PSI) is a global effort that aims to stop trafficking of weapons of mass destruction (WMD), their delivery systems, and related materials to and from states and non-state actors of proliferation concern. Launched by United States President George W. Bush in May 2003 at a meeting in Kraków, Poland, the PSI has now grown to include the endorsement of 105 nations around the world, including Russia, Canada, the United Kingdom, Australia, France, Germany, Italy, Argentina, Japan, the Netherlands, Poland, Singapore, New Zealand, Republic of Korea and Norway.

Despite the support of over half of the Members of the United Nations, a number of countries have expressed opposition to the initiative, including India, China and Indonesia.

== History ==
The idea of the PSI is generally credited to John R. Bolton, former US Under-Secretary of State for Arms Control and International Security and former United States Ambassador to the United Nations, after 15 Scud missiles found on board an unflagged North Korean freighter, the So Sen, heading towards Yemen had to be released when it turned out that international law did not allow them to be confiscated. Given this apparent gap in international law, several months later US President Bush announced the initiative with his counterpart, Polish President Aleksander Kwaśniewski at Wawel Castle in Kraków on May 31, 2003.

Initially, the PSI included 11 "core" states (Australia, France, Germany, Japan, the Netherlands, Portugal, Spain, the United Kingdom, the US and Poland). On September 4, 2003, in Paris, these countries detailed the principles governing the PSI in a document titled the "Statement of Interdiction Principles". The document defines the activities which are to be undertaken by the initiative, specifically "to establish a more coordinated and effective basis through which to impede and stop shipments of WMD, delivery systems, and related materials flowing to and from states and non-state actors of proliferation concern, consistent with national legal authorities and relevant international law and frameworks, including the UN Security Council circumstances in which such operations may be carried out (at sea, on land, or in the air) including, most importantly, the requirement that any action taken must be consistent with international law." Since the initial core group of 2003, PSI has expanded to include an "Operational Experts Group" (OEG) of 21 nations as well as 84 other endorsing states. Key states who have endorsed the initiative since its initial founding include major actors in international trade such as Singapore and the United Arab Emirates, as well as countries such as Turkey and the Republic of Korea, who are geographically close to states designated by United Nations Security Council resolutions as proliferation threats.

Eleven nations have signed bilateral Mutual Shipboarding Agreements with the United States, allowing the mutual expedition of shipboarding requests for ships under those nations' flags. The Eleven are the Antigua and Barbuda, Bahamas, Belize, Croatia, Cyprus, Liberia, Malta, the Marshall Islands, Mongolia, Panama and St. Vincent and the Grenadines. Each of these nations maintains a large number of commercial vessels on their registries, and are often considered flag of convenience states.

In April 2009, at a speech in Prague, Czech Republic, newly inaugurated President Barack Obama announced that he planned to transform the PSI into a "durable international institution", indicating that US promotion of the initiative would remain non-partisan and cross over from the previous administration. Indeed, Obama had made the strengthening of the PSI one of his campaign promises in the Presidential election of 2008 and continued to promote the PSI through the 2010 White House Nuclear Security Strategy.

The 2013 PSI High Level Political Meeting facilitated the adoption of a set of four Joint Statements, advancing cooperation among PSI endorsing states toward: - Ensuring a Robust Initiative - Enhancing Critical Interdiction Capabilities and Practices - Strengthening Authorities for Action - Expanding Strategic Communications

Progress on implementation was reviewed at the PSI Mid-Level Political Meeting in January 2016, hosted in Washington, DC. Another PSI High Level Political Meeting will be hosted in France in 2018.

Since 2003, The PSI has addressed a much wider array of proliferation security issues, such as customs enforcement, export controls, proliferation finance, and intangible transfers of technology. Given its broad and flexible mandate, the PSI now claims to advance proliferation security norms and standards of practice.

== Participation ==
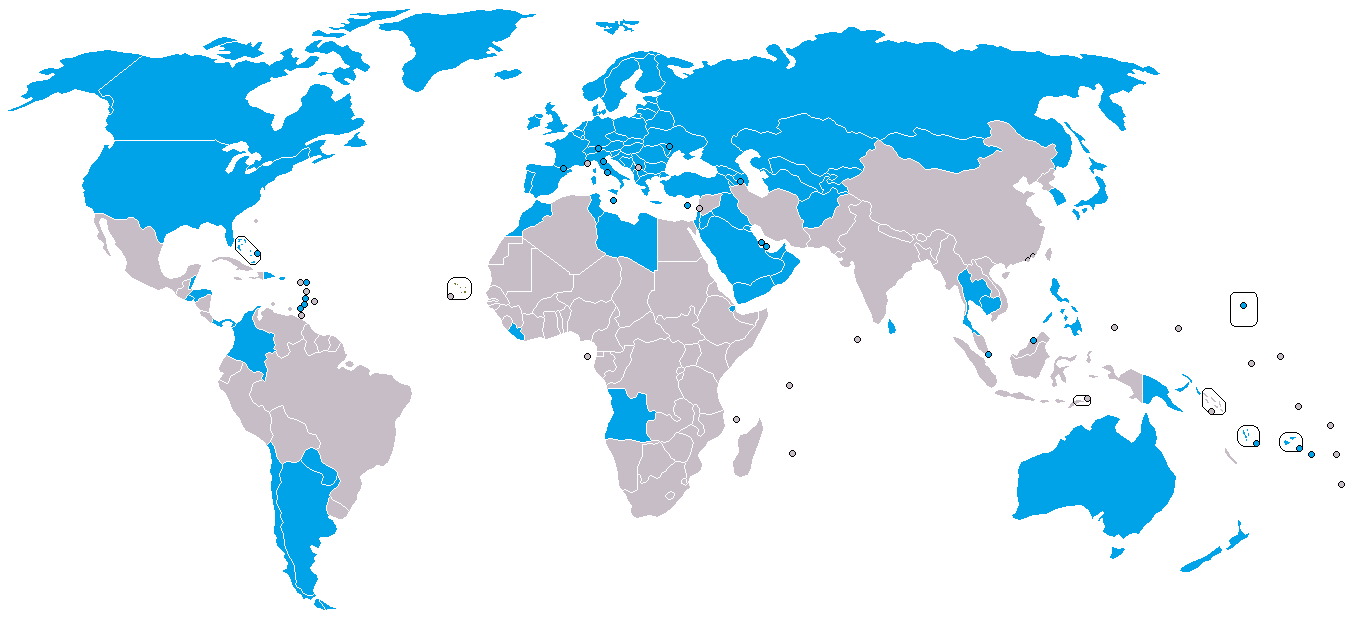
PSI-endorsing states, as of 2013

The primary role of PSI participants is to abide by the Statement of Interdiction Principles, with the primary purpose of interdicting subject weapons and materials. Additionally, participants are recommended to enact legal statutes to facilitate effective interdiction and seizure of such items. Finally, participants are to take measures to ensure that their national facilities are not utilized to transfer illicit weapon cargoes.

The PSI also supports the maintenance of an informal network of transgovernmental linkages that sustain cooperation outside of the formal PSI framework.

In the United States, the program is managed by the National Security Staff working out of the White House, with the United States Department of State and the United States Department of Defense playing lead roles; with other departments and agencies in supporting roles.

Participation in PSI activities generally include OEG meetings, live exercises, command post exercises, tabletop exercises, seminars, workshops, and other WMD Interdiction training. Current members include:

- Afghanistan
- Albania
- Andorra
- Angola
- Antigua and Barbuda
- Argentina
- Armenia
- Australia
- Austria
- Azerbaijan
- Bahamas, The
- Bahrain
- Belarus
- Belgium
- Belize
- Benin
- Bosnia and Herzegovina
- Brunei Darussalam
- Bulgaria
- Cambodia
- Canada
- Chile
- Colombia
- Croatia
- Cyprus
- Czech Republic
- Denmark
- Djibouti
- Dominica
- Dominican Republic
- El Salvador
- Estonia
- Equatorial Guinea
- Fiji
- Finland
- France
- Federated States of Micronesia
- Georgia
- Germany
- Ghana
- Greece
- Holy See
- Honduras
- Hungary
- Iceland
- Iraq
- Ireland
- Israel
- Italy
- Japan
- Jordan
- Kazakhstan
- Korea, Republic of
- Kyrgyzstan
- Kuwait
- Latvia
- Liberia
- Libya
- Liechtenstein
- Lithuania
- Luxembourg
- Macedonia
- Madagascar
- Malaysia
- Malta
- Marshall Islands
- Moldova
- Mongolia
- Montenegro
- Morocco
- The Netherlands
- New Zealand
- Norway
- Oman
- Palau
- Panama
- Papua New Guinea
- Paraguay
- Philippines
- Poland
- Portugal
- Qatar
- Romania
- Samoa
- Saudi Arabia
- San Marino
- Serbia
- Singapore
- Slovakia
- Slovenia
- Spain
- Sri Lanka
- St. Lucia
- St. Vincent and the Grenadines
- Sweden
- Switzerland
- Tajikistan
- Thailand
- Togo
- Tunisia
- Turkey
- Turkmenistan
- Trinidad and Tobago
- Ukraine
- United Arab Emirates
- United Kingdom
- United States
- Uzbekistan
- Vanuatu
- Vietnam
- Yemen
- Zambia

== Critical Capabilities and Practices (CCP) ==
Endorsing states are developing a formal set of tools called Critical Capabilities and Practices (CCP) for use by all PSI partners to aid in their ability to interdict WMD. An ongoing effort, the CCP is organized into four elements:

Element 1. Prohibiting Proliferation-Related Conduct – Having in place appropriate legal authorities to prohibit and prevent proliferation activity within and across one’s border

Element 2. Inspection and Identification – The ability to effectively inspect air, land, and sea cargos and to identify proliferation-related materials

Element 3. Seizure and Disposition – The ability to undertake appropriate actions to seize and dispose of interdiction-related materials

Element 4. Rapid Decision Making – The development of decision-making practices that facilitate timely government responses to interdiction scenarios

Examples of these capacity building tools include:

• Model Legislation

• Commodity identification guides and associated training

• Legal analyses of UN Security Council Resolutions

• Expert briefings on inspection methodologies

• Best practices associated with information sharing and decision-making procedures

The CCP effort is advanced by the CCP Review Team, launched in 2015. The Review Team seeks to enhance the resources available to PSI endorsing countries through compiling a library of tools and resources and through assisting in the coordination of capacity building events and exercises. Review Team members include: Australia, Canada, France, Germany, Norway, Poland, Russia, and the United States.

== Interdictions and events ==
The PSI has no central body or secretariat and is not a coordinator of real-world interdictions. It is a political commitment, a flexible arrangement of international cooperation and is consistent with domestic and international legal authorities. Endorsing states seek a robust capacity to conduct interdictions that usually involve only two or three governments.

- On December 9, 2002 the SPS Navarra intercepted and boarded the freighter So San, several hundred miles southeast of Yemen at the request of the U.S. government as part of Operation Enduring Freedom. The So San, sailing without a flag, attempted evasive action, so the Navarra after firing four warning shots into the water at the bow of the ship and rifle fire on the ship's hull, getting no answer, fired on a cable crossing the So San from bow to stern to remove obstacles and proceeded to approach it from a helicopter. The ship from North Korea was carrying a cargo of 15 Scud missiles, 15 conventional warheads with 250 kg of high explosive, 23 fuel tanks of nitric acid and 85 drums of chemicals. Yemen subsequently reported that the cargo belonged to them and protested against interception, ordering the materials returned. Although this incident occurred prior to the establishment of the PSI, it is cited as being a major reason for the PSI's establishment.
- In September 2003, Germany obtained information that the BBC China, an Antigua and Barbuda-flagged vessel, was transporting nuclear-related materials to Libya as on behalf of the Abdul Qadeer Khan proliferation network. The German government dispatched intelligence experts to Italy, who conducted an inspection of the ship in the Mediterranean with the support of the US Navy. The inspection revealed that the ship's container number was fabricated and the German government confiscated the nuclear-related equipment (aluminum tubes that can be converted into centrifuges). Although some sources cite this interdiction as an early success of the PSI, others dispute the initiative's relationship to this event.
- In an embarrassing "failure" of the PSI, in April 2005 Germany authorized the export of a high-tech crane aboard the vessel Hual Africa that could be utilized in Iran's Shahab-4 missile program.
- In June 2009, the North Korean vessel Kang Nam believed to be headed to Myanmar turned around after being tracked by the US Navy. In the same timeframe, two Japanese and one Korean man were arrested for trying to import WMD technology to Myanmar. After this incident, North Korea claimed that it would engage in military action in retaliation for any searching of its ships.
- On September 22, 2009, South Korea seized North Korean containers transiting the port of Busan which contained protective clothing used to protect against chemical weapons.
- In December 2009, Thailand stopped a North Korean shipment of mixed conventional arms and missile technology, based on information from US intelligence, which had been tracking the shipment since it departed Pyongyang. The ultimate planned destination of the materials was not determined, but it was thought to be heading towards Iran (to eventually arm Hezbollah or Hamas) or potentially Pakistan. Months later, in February 2010 South Africa ordered the return of a shipment of North Korean military equipment to the port of Durban, ostensibly declared as heading to the Republic of Congo.
- In June 2011, The New York Times reported on the turning around of the Belize-flagged North Korean Vessel MV Light, suspected of transporting missile technology to Myanmar. The USS McCampbell intercepted the ship and requested boarding, which was refused by the vessel operator despite the granting of authority from Belize, consistent with the US-Belize ship boarding agreement (see History above). The failure of the North Korean crew to comply with the orders of its flag arguably made it a "stateless" vessel under international maritime law, however the ship was allowed to return to North Korea. Although the materials were not "interdicted" or even inspected to verify a violation, the fact that the commodity never reached its planned target arguably made it a "success" for PSI.

== Exercises ==
PSI activities include the regular holding of activities known as "exercises," which aim to test the authorities and capabilities of endorsee nations to interdict WMD-related materials. Exercises can include "live action" events such as ship boardings or container searches, or be limited to "tabletop" activities where subject matter experts explore legal and operational interdiction questions related to a fictional scenario. Recent PSI exercises have included:

•PHOENIX EXPRESS 2012 (May), a US-led maritime exercise, with a PSI inject, held in the Mediterranean Sea

•PACIFIC SHIELD 2012 (July), a dedicated PSI exercise hosted by Japan, featuring an air scenario

•PANAMAX 2012 (Aug), a joint U.S./Panama maritime exercise with a PSI inject

•EASTERN ENDEAVOR 2012 (Sep), a dedicated PSI exercise hosted by South Korea, featuring a maritime scenario

•Eastern European PSI Workshop (Nov 2012), hosted by Moldova, featuring a ground-based scenario

•LEADING EDGE 2013 (Feb), a joint UAE/US dedicated PSI exercise featuring air, maritime and ground interdiction activities

•SAHARAN EXPRESS 2013 (Mar), a US-led maritime exercise with a PSI inject, held off the West Coast of Africa

== Criticism ==
=== Legality ===
Critics of PSI, such as China, Iran and the Democratic People's Republic of Korea (DPRK), argue that the declared intent of PSI members to stop ships on the high seas is a violation of international law guaranteeing freedom of the seas. In particular, it's argued that Article 23 of the United Nations Convention on the Law of the Sea (UNCLOS) allows ships "carrying nuclear or other inherently dangerous or noxious substances" the right of innocent passage through territorial seas. Opponents have asserted that the PSI gives states a license to carry out acts of "piracy" on the high seas. It has also been argued the PSI's intent to "interdict nuclear materials and contraband" is a broad enough charter to include any naval operation anywhere and for any actual purpose. There are concerns that such actions could lead to war. Indonesia's Foreign Minister Hassan Wirajuda argued that the PSI "initiative was not initiated through a multilateral process, but only a group of nations that have a common goal to conduct a certain initiatives." He also believed that PSI violates the UNCLOS. (Xinhua News Agency, March 17, 2006). Other critics have argued that PSI activities violate international laws regarding self-defense, Articles 19 and 88 of UNCLOS. A large proportion of criticisms of the legality of PSI come from Indian news sources. Criticism over the legality of PSI also focus around the fact that the initiative does not fall under any United Nations committee or body, and that doing so might legitimize it.

=== Targets specific states ===
Many of academic and news articles about the initiative state that the PSI is focused specifically on states such as Iran and the DPRK. North Korea has stated that it feels the PSI is an instrument for an aggressive war planned by the United States against the DPRK under the pretext of blockading ships and planes. Indian publications discouraging participation in PSI have defined PSI as being specifically directed towards Iran and have stated that "India on no account should be a part of any anti-Iranian strategic initiative led by the United States." Other potential suggested targets of PSI have included Syria, Myanmar, and Pakistan.

Despite these accusations and perceptions, all official PSI documentation and press releases state that PSI does not target any particular state, and that individual nations within the initiative are able to make self-determinations on what shipments are targeted. Several PSI-endorsee states have diplomatic and trade relationships with Iran, the DPRK, and other states suggested as likely targets.

=== Perception as a "US-led" initiative ===
The preponderance of news sources and academic analysis on the initiative often describe PSI as being a "US-led" initiative. Like the issue of whether PSI targets specific states, participants in the initiative itself explicitly deny that it is an effort "led" by the United States and that PSI is truly defined by the nonproliferation activities of endorsing nations.

Much early criticism of the initiative also explicitly linked PSI to other international activities of the globally controversial George W. Bush administration, including namely the war on terror, invasion of Afghanistan to overthrow the Taliban, the 2003 invasion of Iraq, and a general international perception of US unilateralism outside of United Nations frameworks. Domestically in the United States, liberal critics referenced the PSI and its links to Under-Secretary Bolton as an extension of the Bush Administration's "Coalition of the willing." However, over time much of these criticisms have subsided as PSI activities grew to have large bipartisan support in the United States Congress and the PSI continued to be promoted under the Presidency of Barack Obama.

With President Obama's continued promotion of the initiative and commitment to expand and institutionalize it, many initial opponents of the initiative have reduced their negative comments and begun efforts to explore joining the initiative in order to be recognized as a player in global non-proliferation efforts.

=== Lack of transparency ===
Some criticism of PSI has been pointed towards the "secretive" nature of the initiative. It has been argued that "the secretiveness surrounding PSI interdictions and the methods employed make it difficult to evaluate its effectiveness or its legitimacy," and that the lack of formality and structure in the initiative are causes for concern.

In a June 2006 speech, then-Undersecretary of State Robert Joseph claimed that between April 2005 and April 2006 the United States had cooperated with other PSI participants on "roughly two dozen" occasions to prevent transfers of concern; and in May 2005 Ulrik Federspiel, Denmark’s ambassador to the United States, asserted that "the shipment of missiles has fallen significantly in the lifetime of PSI." However, references such as these provide no actual information on or evidence of interdictions which have occurred, leaving critics to remain skeptical of such numbers or of any "metrics" that prove the effectiveness of the initiative.

While these criticisms persist, many PSI events, such as annual Operational Experts Group meetings, contain a very high degree of civil society participation. Think tanks and industry representatives, for instance, participated in the 2016 Operational Experts Group meeting and were permitted to Tweet throughout.

=== Responses to criticism ===
Much of the criticism about the PSI have been faced with counter-arguments, given the inaccurate or outdated nature of much of the information about the initiative. The most common negative portrayal of PSI represents it as an illegal, US-led effort to interdict third party vessels on the high seas. PSI proponents have countered that:

- United Nations Security Council Resolution (UNSCR) 1540 places an international obligation on all Members of the UN to take action against the proliferation of WMD, and its language matches closely with the PSI Statement of Interdiction Principles.
- UNSCRs 1874 (on the DPRK's WMD program) and 1929 (on Iran's WMD program) explicitly call on or require UN Members to take interdiction and inspection actions against WMD-related materials that are consistent with PSI's principles. Thus inspection of such vessels are international mandates rather than "piracy," as accused by DPRK and Iran.
- Article 4 of the 2005 Protocol to the Convention for the Suppression of Unlawful Acts Against the Safety of Maritime Navigation illegalize the illicit transfer of WMD-related materials by maritime vessel.
- The 2010 International Civil Aviation Organization (ICAO) "Convention on the Suppression of Unlawful Acts Relating to International Civil Aviation" and "Protocol Supplementary to the Convention for the Suppression of Unlawful Seizure of Aircraft" illegalize the illicit transfer of WMD-related materials by aircraft.
- Contrary to comments that the PSI works "outside" of international frameworks such as the United Nations, UN officials including Secretary General Kofi Annan have "applaud[ed] the efforts of the Proliferation Security Initiative to fill a gap in our defenses."
- In February 2004, the PSI was "expanded" beyond a military and intelligence effort to include greater cooperation with law enforcement entities. PSI has largely evolved from a focus on interdiction of ships at sea to inspection in ports.
- The vast majority of PSI exercises (see exercises section above) include activities involving customs services, law enforcement officials, and focus on cargo traveling by air and land as well as sea - including cargo transiting within a country's territory. This directly contradicts the common perceptions of PSI as military, maritime or high seas-focused.
- As noted within the PSI principles, PSI is an "activity, not an organization" and grants no state any additional authorities to take action. All states are merely asked to take actions consistent with domestic and international law. Therefore, PSI as an initiative explicitly recommends only actions within international and domestic legal authorities.
- A large portion of states which have been critical of PSI consider themselves part of the Non-Aligned Movement, which indicates that while nominally claiming objections to the initiative for "legal" reasons, actual hesitation towards endorsement might be more aligned with political considerations, such as not wanting to be seen as supporting United States or "Western" initiatives.
- China's objections for supposed legal reasons also come into question, as it has been identified as a neighboring country which has supported transshipment of DPRK's WMD materials, and "turns a blind eye to North Korea’s proliferation whenever it can get away with it."

== See also ==
- Container Security Initiative
- Global Initiative to Combat Nuclear Terrorism
- Nuclear proliferation
- Chemical, biological, radiological, and nuclear
- Global Trade Exchange
