= Beijing Treaty =

The Beijing Treaty may refer to:

- Convention of Peking, three treaties concluded between Qing China and each of Great Britain, France and Russia in 1860.
- Sino-Portuguese Treaty of Peking of 1887 between Qing China and Portugal.
- Convention for the Extension of Hong Kong Territory, also known as the "Second Convention of Peking", a treaty concluded between Qing China and Great Britain in 1898.
- Beijing Convention, a 2010 multilateral aviation treaty
- Beijing Protocol, a 2010 protocol supplement to the 1970 Hague Hijacking Convention
- Beijing Treaty on Audiovisual Performances, a 2012 multilateral copyright treaty
