= United Nations Security Council Resolution 1977 =

UN Security Council Resolution 1977
- African signatories to the African Nuclear Weapon Free Zone Treaty (green)
- Date: 20 April 2011
- Meeting no.: 6,518
- Code: S/RES/1977 (Document)
- Subject: Non-proliferation of weapons of mass destruction
- Voting summary: 15 voted for; None voted against; None abstained
- Result: Adopted

Security Council composition
- Permanent members: China; France; Russia; United Kingdom; United States
- Non-permanent members: Bosnia–Herzegovina; Brazil; Colombia; Germany; Gabon; India; Lebanon; Nigeria; Portugal; South Africa

United Nations Security Council Resolution 1977, adopted unanimously on April 20, 2011, after recalling resolutions 1540 (2004), 1673 (2006) and 1810 (2008) concerning non-proliferation (where the Council extended the mandate of the committee established in Resolution 1540)—to monitor efforts to prevent weapons of mass destruction from being acquired by terrorists or other non-state actors.

== Resolution ==
=== Observations ===
In the preamble of the resolution, the Security Council expressed concern at the risk of the misacquisition of chemical, biological and nuclear weapons. A reminder for all Member States to comply with obligations relating to disarmament, arms control and non-proliferation was emphasised. In this regard, international co-operation was essential. The Council stressed that controls on the export of technologies and information that could be used for weapons of mass destruction should be further strengthened.

Meanwhile, the resolution recognised progress that was made as an implementation of Resolution 1540. The countries that had taken few measures in some of its areas, nor reported to the 1540 Committee on measures, were reported and given reinforcement to implement the resolution. At the same time, the Council recognised that some states required assistance in implementing Resolution 1540.

=== Acts ===
Acting under Chapter VII of the United Nations Charter, the mandate of 1540 Committee was further extended for a period of 10 years, until 25 April 2021. The committee was instructed to undertake a comprehensive review five and ten years prior to the renewal of its mandate on the implementation of Resolution 1540, and to submit an annual work plan by 31 May 2011, to the council. Furthermore, the committee was to receive assistance from eight experts. The resolution then addressed the following issues relating to the committee:

Implementation of Resolution 1540
All countries that had not reported to the Committee on their efforts to implement Resolution 1540 were requested to do so as soon as possible.

Assistance
Countries that required assistance were instructed to notify the Committee, while other countries were asked to provide assistance to the Committee.

Co-operation with international, regional and subregional organisations
International, regional and subregional organisations were called upon to provide a point of contact with the Committee for the implementation of Resolution 1540, and to engage in the sharing of information.

Transparency and outreach
The 1540 Committee had to continue to act transparently, making the fullest use of its website and to organise and participate in outreach events.

Administration and resources

- The Council recognised that the Committee required sustained support and resources to fulfil its mandate.

== See also ==
- List of states with nuclear weapons
- List of United Nations Security Council Resolutions 1901 to 2000 (2009–2011)
- Nuclear Non-Proliferation Treaty
- Nuclear-weapon-free zone
