= Protocol for the Suppression of Unlawful Acts against the Safety of Fixed Platforms Located on the Continental Shelf =

Multilateral treaty for offshore platforms

- Type: Anti-terrorism, international criminal law, admiralty law
- Signed: 10 March 1988
- Location: Rome, Italy
- Effective: 1 March 1992
- Condition: three ratifications
- Parties: 156
- Depositary: Secretary-General of the International Maritime Organization
- Languages: Arabic, English, French, Russian, and Spanish

The Protocol for the Suppression of Unlawful Acts against the Safety of Fixed Platforms Located on the Continental Shelf (SUA PROT) is a multilateral treaty by which states agree to prohibit and punish behaviour which may threaten the safety of offshore fixed platforms, including oil platforms.

== Content ==
The Protocol was concluded at the same time as the Convention for the Suppression of Unlawful Acts against the Safety of Maritime Navigation (SUA Convention) and like it is based on the Convention for the Suppression of Unlawful Seizure of Aircraft.

The Protocol criminalises the following behaviour:

1. Seizing control of a fixed platform by force or threat of force;
2. committing an act of violence against a person on a fixed platform if it is likely to endanger the safety of the platform;
3. destroying a fixed platform or damaging it in such a way that endangers its safety;
4. placing or causing to be placed on a fixed platform a device or substance which is likely to destroy or cause damage to the ship or its cargo;
5. injuring or killing anyone while committing 1–4;
6. attempting any of 1–5;
7. being an accomplice to any of 1–6; and
8. compelling another through threats to commit any of 1–7.

The Protocol sets out the principle of aut dedere aut judicare—that a state party to the treaty must either (1) prosecute a person who commits one of the offences or (2) send the individual to another state that requests his or her extradition for prosecution of the same crime.

== Creation and entry into force ==
The Protocol was adopted by the International Conference on the Suppression of Unlawful Acts against the Safety of Maritime Navigation at Rome on 10 March 1988. Formally, it is a Protocol that is supplementary to the SUA Convention and could not have come into force before the SUA Convention. It came into force on 1 March 1992 on the same date that the SUA Convention came into force.

== State parties ==
As of November 2018, the convention has 156 state parties, which includes 155 UN member states plus Niue.

The following are the 38 UN member states that are not party to the convention. An asterisk beside the state indicates that the state is not a landlocked country and thus has maritime coastline.

- Angola*
- Belize*
- Bhutan
- Burundi
- Cameroon*
- Central African Republic
- Chad
- Colombia*
- Democratic Republic of the Congo*
- East Timor*
- Eritrea*
- Ethiopia
- Gabon*
- Gambia*
- Haiti*
- Indonesia*
- Iraq*
- Kyrgyzstan
- Malaysia*
- Federated States of Micronesia*
- Nepal
- North Korea*
- Papua New Guinea*
- Rwanda
- Saint Kitts and Nevis*
- Samoa*
- Sierra Leone*
- Solomon Islands*
- Somalia*
- South Sudan
- Sri Lanka*
- Suriname*
- Thailand*
- Tuvalu*
- Uganda
- Venezuela*
- Zambia
- Zimbabwe

Of these 38 states, Iraq has signed the Protocol.

== 2005 Protocol ==
In London on 14 October 2005, a supplementary Protocol to SUA PROT was concluded. The full name of the 2005 Protocol is the Protocol of 2005 to the Protocol for the Suppression of Unlawful Acts against the Safety of Fixed Platforms Located on the Continental Shelf and is often abbreviated as "SUA PROT 2005". The 2005 Protocol adds provisions which criminalises the use of fixed platforms to discharge biological, chemical, or nuclear weapons. It also prohibits ships from discharging oil, liquefied natural gas, radioactive materials, or other hazardous or noxious substances in quantities or concentrations that are likely to cause death or serious injury or damage. It also prohibits the use of such weapons or substances against fixed platforms.

The Protocol came into force on 28 July 2010 and as of February 2016 has been ratified by 35 states.
