= United Nations Security Council Resolution 1673 =

UN Security Council Resolution 1673
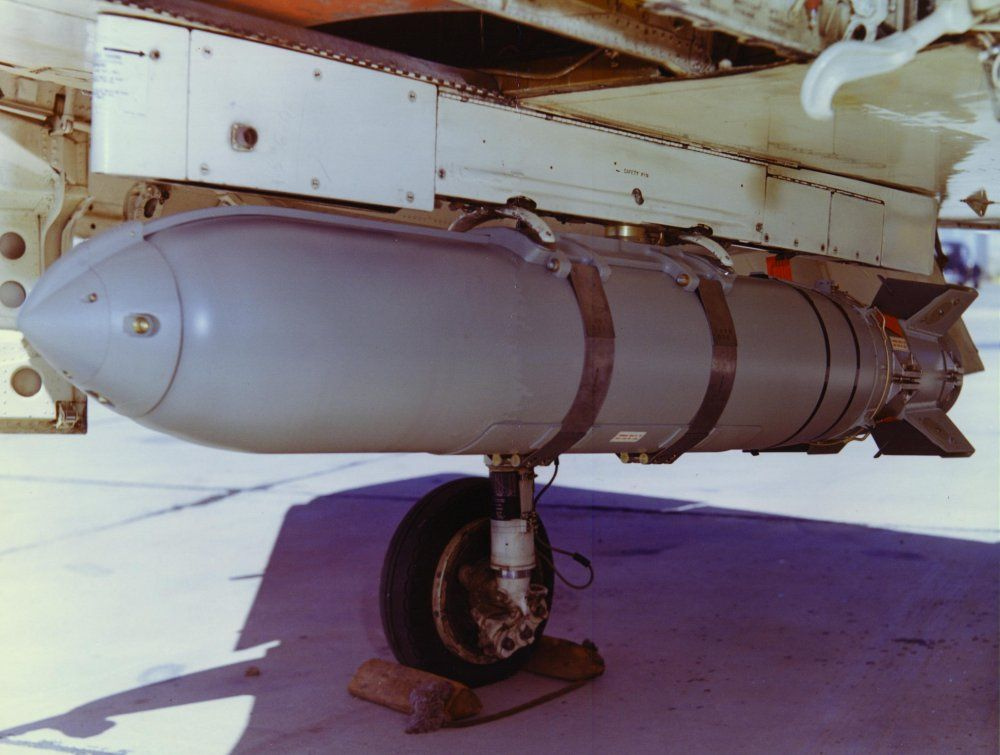
- Chemical bomb
- Date: 27 April 2006
- Meeting no.: 5,429
- Code: S/RES/1673 (Document)
- Subject: Non-proliferation of weapons of mass destruction
- Voting summary: 15 voted for; None voted against; None abstained
- Result: Adopted

Security Council composition
- Permanent members: China; France; Russia; United Kingdom; United States
- Non-permanent members: Argentina; Rep. of the Congo; Denmark; Ghana; Greece; Japan; Peru; Qatar; Slovakia; Tanzania

United Nations Security Council Resolution 1673, adopted unanimously on April 27, 2006, after considering a report from the Committee of the Security Council established in Resolution 1540 (2004) concerning non-proliferation, the Council extended the mandate of the Committee monitoring the resolution's implementation concerning weapons of mass destruction and their means of delivery until April 27, 2008.

== Resolution ==
=== Observations ===
Resolution 1673 began by reaffirming that the proliferation of nuclear, chemical and biological weapons as well as their means of delivery constituted a threat to international peace and security. It endorsed the work of the Security Council Committee, and noted that not all states had provided a report to the Committee regarding their efforts to implement Resolution 1540. In this context, it regarded the implementation of Resolution 1540 as a long-term task involving efforts at national, regional and international levels.

At the same time, the resolution noted obligations in that resolution were in conflict with those contained in the Nuclear Non-proliferation Treaty (NPT), Chemical Weapons Convention or Biological Weapons Convention, or alter the role of the International Atomic Energy Agency (IAEA) or Organisation for the Prohibition of Chemical Weapons.

=== Acts ===
Acting under Chapter VII of the United Nations Charter, the Council called on all countries to fully implement Resolution 1540, and for states that had not yet submitted reports to the committee to do so immediately. Those nations that had already reported were encouraged to provide additional information on measures taken to implement Resolution 1540.

The mandate of the committee was extended for two years and it was encouraged to intensify efforts to promote the implementation of Resolution 1540, with Council members further urging co-operation between the committee and states and international organisations. Finally, it was to report to the council by the end of its mandate on April 27, 2008, on progress with regards to the implementation of Resolution 1540.

== See also ==
- Chemical, biological, radiological, and nuclear
- List of United Nations Security Council Resolutions 1601 to 1700 (2005–2006)
- Nuclear Non-proliferation Treaty
- Terrorism
