= Paul Fauchille =

French lawyer and scholar

Paul Auguste Joseph Fauchille (11 February 1858 – 9 February 1926) was a French lawyer and scholar, best remembered as a pioneer of air law. He was born in Loos, France, and studied law in Douai and at the University of Paris. An advocate at the Court of Appeals, a law professor and Member of the Institut de Droit International he promoted with his mentor Louis Renault the new interest in international law. He had been a co–founder and editor of the Revue Generale de Droit International Public (1894) and co–founder of the Institute of Higher International Studies (IHEI 1921) . His magnum opus became the four volume Traite de Droit international public 1921–26 which encompassed 4600 pages being still in print.

== See also ==
- Tokyo Convention
