= Convention for the Suppression of Unlawful Acts against the Safety of Maritime Navigation =

- Type: Admiralty law, International criminal law, anti-terrorism
- Signed: 10 March 1988
- Location: Rome, Italy
- Effective: 1 March 1992
- Condition: 15 ratifications
- Parties: 166
- Depositary: Secretary-General of the International Maritime Organization
- Languages: Arabic, English, French, Russian, and Spanish

The Convention for the Suppression of Unlawful Acts against the Safety of Maritime Navigation or SUA Convention is a multilateral treaty by which states agree to prohibit and punish behaviour which may threaten the safety of maritime navigation.

== Content ==
The convention is based upon the 1971 Convention for the Suppression of Unlawful Acts Against the Safety of Civil Aviation and the Convention for the Suppression of Unlawful Seizure of Aircraft and criminalises similar behaviour in the context of maritime navigation.

The Convention criminalises the following behaviour:

1. Seizing control of a ship by force or threat of force;
2. committing an act of violence against a person on ship if it is likely to endanger the safety of the ship;
3. destroying or damaging a ship or its cargo in such a way that endangers the safe navigation of the ship;
4. placing or causing to be placed on a ship a device or substance which is likely to destroy or cause damage to the ship or its cargo;
5. destroying or damaging a ship's navigation facilities or interfering with their operation if it is likely to endanger the safety of the ship;
6. communicating information which is known to be false, thereby endangering the safety of the navigation of a ship;
7. injuring or killing anyone while committing 1–6;
8. attempting any of 1–7;
9. being an accomplice to any of 1–8; and
10. compelling another through threats to commit any of 1–9.

The Convention sets out the principle of aut dedere aut judicare—that a state party to the treaty must either (1) prosecute a person who commits one of the offences or (2) send the individual to another state that requests his or her extradition for prosecution of the same crime.

The Convention does not apply to:

1. A warship; or
2. a ship owned or operated by a State when being used as a naval auxiliary or for customs or police purposes; or
3. a ship which has been withdrawn from navigation or laid up.

Nothing in the convention affects the immunities of warships and other government ships operated for non-commercial purposes.

== Creation ==
The 1985 Achille Lauro hijacking inspired enhanced international maritime safety regulations to prevent further acts of maritime terrorism. In its aftermath, the United States led efforts within the International Maritime Organization to establish MSC Circular 443, a non-binding policy outlining recommended port and vessel security measures to prevent unlawful acts. Building on this, Italy, Egypt, and Austria launched a trilateral initiative with American support, culminating in the adoption of the Convention for the Suppression of Unlawful Acts Against the Safety of Maritime Navigation at a diplomatic conference in Rome on 10 March 1988.

The convention came into force on 1 March 1992 after 15 states had ratified it.

== Parties ==
As of June 2015, the convention has 166 state parties, which includes 164 UN member states plus the Cook Islands and Niue. The 166 states represent 94.5 per cent of the gross tonnage of the world's merchant fleet.

The following 29 UN member states are not party to the convention. States with coastlines have asterisks.

- Angola*
- Belize*
- Bhutan
- Burundi
- Cameroon*
- Central African Republic
- Chad
- Colombia*
- Democratic Republic of the Congo*
- East Timor*
- Eritrea*
- Gabon*
- Haiti*
- Indonesia*
- Kyrgyzstan
- Malaysia*
- Nepal
- North Korea*
- Papua New Guinea*
- Rwanda
- Sierra Leone*
- Solomon Islands*
- Somalia*
- South Sudan
- Suriname*
- Thailand*
- Venezuela*
- Zambia
- Zimbabwe

== Protocol ==
The Protocol for the Suppression of Unlawful Acts against the Safety of Fixed Platforms Located on the Continental Shelf (SUA PROT) was concluded at the same time as SUA. It came into force at the same time as SUA. SUA PROT is a supplementary convention to SUA.

In London on 14 October 2005, a second supplementary protocol was introduced, called the Protocol of 2005 to the Convention for the Suppression of Unlawful Acts against the Safety of Maritime Navigation, abbreviated as "SUA 2005". It adds provisions which criminalise the use of ships to transfer or discharge biological, chemical, or nuclear weapons (excepting nuclear weapons transferred by signatories to the Treaty on the Non-Proliferation of Nuclear Weapons). It prohibits ships from discharging oil, liquefied natural gas, radioactive materials, or other hazardous or noxious substances in quantities or concentrations likely to cause death, serious injury or damage, or using them against ships involved in maritime navigation.

SUA 2005 came into force on 28 July 2010 and, as of February 2016, is ratified by 40 states.

== See also ==
- Convention for the Suppression of Unlawful Acts against the Safety of Civil Aviation
- Convention on the High Seas
- Tokyo Convention
- Hague Hijacking Convention
- Hostages Convention
- Beijing Convention
- Achille Lauro hijacking
