= Convention for the Suppression of Unlawful Acts against the Safety of Civil Aviation =

International treaty

- Type: Aviation, International criminal law, anti-terrorism
- Signed: 23 September 1971
- Location: Montreal, Canada
- Effective: 26 January 1973
- Condition: 10 ratifications
- Parties: 190
- Depositary: Governments of the United Kingdom, United States, and Russia (originally the Soviet Union)
- Languages: English, French, Russian, and Spanish

The Convention for the Suppression of Unlawful Acts against the Safety of Civil Aviation (sometimes referred to as the Sabotage Convention or the Montreal Convention) is a multilateral treaty by which states agree to prohibit and punish behaviour which may threaten the safety of civil aviation.

== Content ==
The Convention does not apply to customs, law enforcement or military aircraft, thus it applies exclusively to civilian aircraft.

The Convention criminalises the following behaviour:

1. Committing an act of violence against a person on board an aircraft in flight if it is likely to endanger the safety of the aircraft;
2. destroying an aircraft being serviced or damaging such an aircraft in such a way that renders it incapable of flight or which is likely to endanger its safety in flight;
3. placing or causing to be placed on an aircraft a device or substance which is likely to destroy or cause damage to an aircraft;
4. destroying or damaging air navigation facilities or interfering with their operation if it is likely to endanger the safety of aircraft;
5. communicating information which is known to be false, thereby endangering the safety of an aircraft in flight;
6. attempting any of 1–5; and
7. being an accomplice to any of 1–6.

The Convention sets out the principle of aut dedere aut judicare—that a party to the treaty must either (1) prosecute a person who commits one of the offences or (2) send the individual to another state that requests his or her extradition for prosecution of the same crime.

== Creation and entry into force ==
The convention was adopted by the International Conference on Air Law at Montreal on 23 September 1971. It came into force on 26 January 1973 after it had been ratified by 10 states. As of 2013, the convention has 188 state parties.

== State parties ==
As of June 2025 the convention has 190 state parties, which includes 188 UN members plus the Cook Islands and Niue. The five UN member states that are not parties to the treaty are:

- East Timor
- Eritrea
- Kiribati
- South Sudan
- Tuvalu

=== Former state parties and successions ===
Former state parties that were not formally succeeded by any existing state include Czechoslovakia, East Germany, and Yugoslavia. A number of states ratified but have since been succeeded by new states: Serbia ratified as the Federal Republic of Yugoslavia; Russia ratified as the Soviet Union; Belarus ratified as the Byelorussian SSR; and Ukraine ratified as the Ukrainian SSR. Prior to the unification of Yemen, both North and South Yemen had ratified the convention. The Republic of China signed and ratified the agreement; in 1980, the People's Republic of China approved the treaty with a statement that it declared the Republic of China's actions with respect to the convention "null and void".

== Protocol ==
Protocol for the Suppression of Unlawful Acts of Violence at Airports serving International Civil Aviation
- Type: Aviation, International criminal law, anti-terrorism
- Signed: 24 February 1988
- Location: Montreal, Canada
- Effective: 6 August 1989
- Condition: 10 ratifications
- Parties: 176
- Depositary: ICAO and the governments of the United Kingdom, United States, and Russia (originally the Soviet Union)
- Languages: English, French, Russian, and Spanish

On 24 February 1988 in Montreal, the Protocol for the Suppression of Unlawful Acts of Violence at Airports serving International Civil Aviation was signed as a supplement to the convention.

The Protocol makes it an offence to commit similarly violent, dangerous, or damaging acts in airports that serve civil aviation.

The Protocol came into force on 6 August 1989 and as of October 2022 has been ratified by 176 states, which includes 174 UN member states plus the Cook Islands and Niue. The UN member states that are not parties to the Protocol are the seven states that have not ratified the Convention plus the following 14 states:

- Afghanistan
- Burundi
- Democratic Republic of the Congo (signed)
- Haiti
- Indonesia (signed)
- Malawi (signed)
- Nepal
- Solomon Islands
- Swaziland
- Venezuela (signed)
- Zambia

== See also ==
- Convention for the Suppression of Unlawful Acts against the Safety of Maritime Navigation
