= United Nations Security Council Resolution 1810 =

UN Security Council Resolution 1810
- Date: 25 April 2008
- Meeting no.: 5,877
- Code: S/RES/1810 (Document)
- Subject: Non-proliferation of weapons of mass destruction
- Voting summary: 15 voted for; None voted against; None abstained
- Result: Adopted

Security Council composition
- Permanent members: China; France; Russia; United Kingdom; United States
- Non-permanent members: Burkina Faso; Belgium; Costa Rica; Croatia; Indonesia; Italy; Libya; Panama; South Africa; Vietnam

United Nations Security Council Resolution 1810 was unanimously adopted on 25 April 2008.

== Resolution ==
Reaffirming that the proliferation of nuclear, chemical and biological weapons and their delivery means was a threat to international peace and security, the Security Council today extended for three years the mandate of the Committee created to monitor implementation of its resolution 1540 (2004), which called on all States to establish domestic controls and adopt legislation to prevent the proliferation and use by non-state actors of weapons of mass destruction.

Unanimously adopting resolution 1810 (2008) under the Charter’s Chapter VII, the Council decided that the 1540 Committee should intensify its efforts through its work programme to promote full implementation by all States of resolution 1540 (2004). That included compiling information on the status of States’ implementation of 1540, outreach, dialogue, assistance and cooperation, and which addressed in particular all aspects of paragraph 1 and 2 as well as paragraph 3 on accountability, physical protection, border controls and law enforcement efforts, and national export and trans-shipment controls including controls on providing funds and services such as export and trans-shipment financing.

Paragraph 1 of resolution 1540 mandated that States shall refrain from providing any form of support to non-State actors that attempted to develop or acquire weapons of mass destruction and their means of delivery. Paragraph 2 of that resolution mandated that States, in accordance with national procedures, shall adopt and enforce appropriate effective laws that prohibited any non-State actor from developing or acquiring weapons of mass destruction and their means of delivery, in particular for terrorist purposes.

In that connection, the Council today encouraged all States to prepare on a voluntary basis summary action plans, with the assistance of the 1540 Committee, mapping out their priorities and plans for implementing the key provisions of resolution 1540 and to submit those plans to the Committee.

Further to the text, the Council encouraged ongoing dialogue between the 1540 Committee and States on their further actions to fully implement resolution 1540 (2004) and on technical assistance needed and offered. The Council requested that the Committee continue to organize and participate in regional, subregional and national outreach events to promote States’ implementation of the resolution as well as actively engage with States and relevant international, regional and subregional organizations to promote the sharing of experiences and lessons learned in areas covered by the resolution.

== See also ==
- List of United Nations Security Council Resolutions 1801 to 1900 (2008–2009)
