= Albert Geouffre de Lapradelle =

Albert de Lapradelle and Pitman B. Potter (1935)

Albert Geouffre de Lapradelle, LL.D. (March 30, 1871 – February 2, 1955) was a French scholar of international law.

He was born in Tulle, France. In 1891, he received a doctorate in law from the University of Paris.

He taught in Grenoble and in Paris. He published numerous works on international questions, such as disarmament, rights over territorial waters, and the international aspects of the Monroe Doctrine. In 1905, he joined with Professor Politis in the production of Recueils des arbitrages internationaux. In 1914 he was French exchange professor at Columbia, which gave him the degree of LL.D. He created the Institute of Higher International Studies. His writings include:

- Théories et pratiques des fondations (1894)
- La mer territoriale (1898)
- La conférence de la Paix (1899)
- La question du désarmament (1899)
- La question du Maroc (1904)
- La guerre maritime et le droit des gens (1908)

== Bibliography ==
- Whose International Community? Universalism and the Legacies of Empire; Columbia Department of History, April 2005
