= Institute of Higher International Studies =

International relations school of Panthéon-Assas University

Coordinates: 48°50′49″N 2°20′41″E

- Institut des hautes études internationales
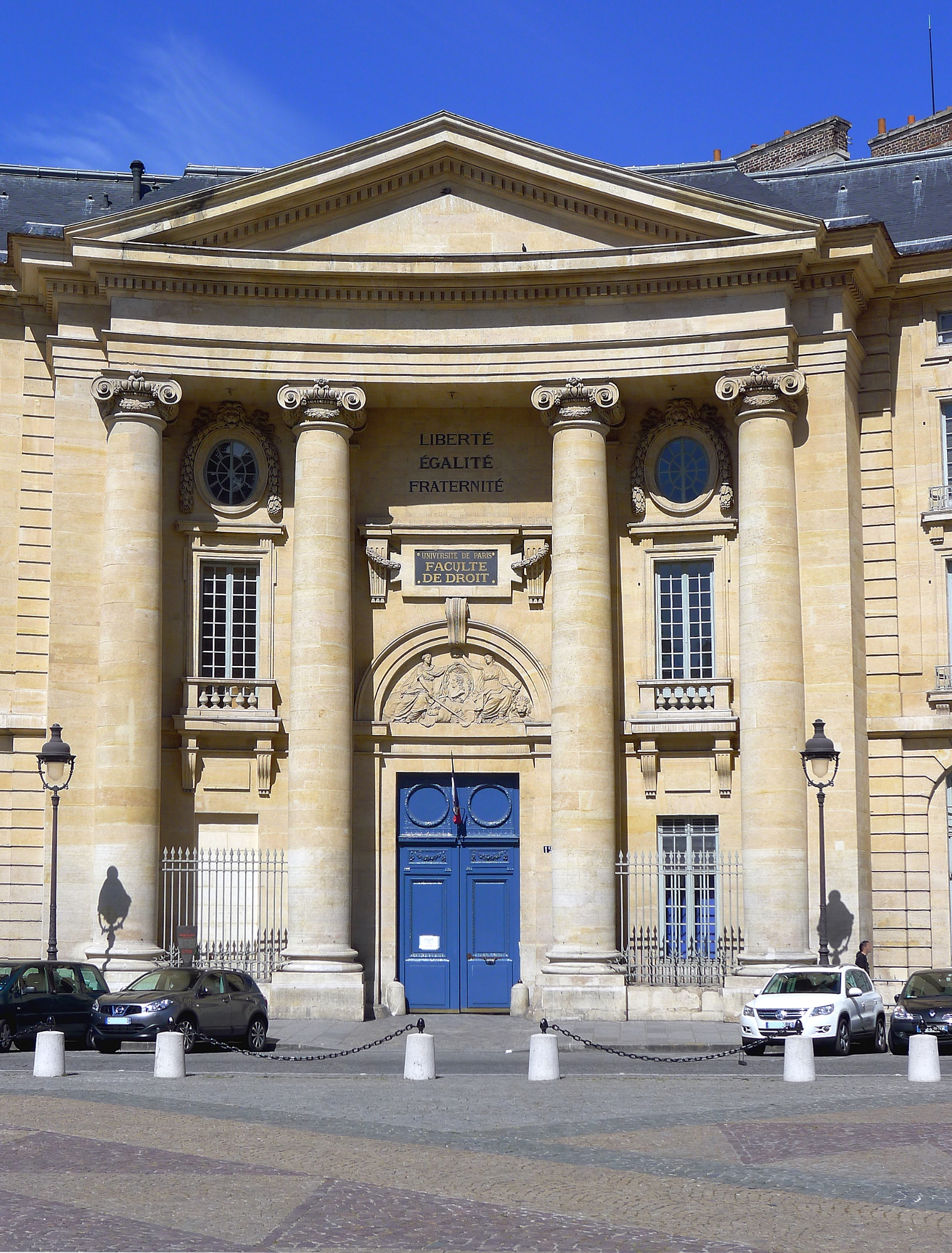
- Established: 1921
- Affiliations: Panthéon-Assas University
- Director: Carlo Santulli
- Location: Paris, France
- Website: www.ihei.fr

The Institute of Higher International Studies (French: Institut des hautes études internationales, commonly referred to as "IHEI") is a public institution of research and higher education in Paris, France. It was founded in 1921 by Paul Fauchille and Albert de Lapradelle. It is now affiliated to Panthéon-Assas University.

== Notable people ==
- Alejandro Álvarez
- Prosper Weil
- Boris Mirkin-Getzevich
- Assad Kotaite
