= Tokyo Convention =

1963 international aviation treaty

Convention on Offences and Certain Other Acts Committed on Board Aircraft
- Drafted: 1958–1963
- Signed: 14 September 1963
- Effective: 4 December 1969
- Condition: Ratification by at least 12 signatories
- Original signatories: 40
- Parties: 187
- Depositary: International Civil Aviation Organization

The Convention on Offences and Certain Other Acts Committed on Board Aircraft, commonly called the Tokyo Convention, is an international treaty concluded at Tokyo on 14 September 1963. It entered into force on 4 December 1969, and as of 2022 has been ratified by 187 parties.

The convention is applicable to offences against penal law and to any acts jeopardising the safety of persons or property on board civilian aircraft while in-flight and engaged in international air navigation. Coverage includes the commission of or the intention to commit offences and certain other acts on board aircraft registered in a Contracting State in-flight over the high seas and any other areas beyond the territory of any State in addition to the airspace belonging to any Contracting State. Criminal jurisdiction may be exercised by Contracting States other than the State of Registry under limited conditions, viz, when the exercise of jurisdiction is required under multilateral international obligations, in the interest of national security, and so forth.

The convention, for the first time in the history of international aviation law, recognises certain powers and immunities of the aircraft commander who on international flights may restrain any person(s) he has reasonable cause to believe is committing or is about to commit an offence liable to interfere with the safety of persons or property on board or who is jeopardising good order and discipline.

In strictly domestic cases the Convention does not have application and acts and offences committed in the airspace of the State of Registry are excluded except when the point of departure or intended landing lies outside that State, or the aircraft enters into the airspace of a State other than the State of Registry as for example on a domestic flight which traverses the boundary of another State.

== Introduction ==
Study of the question of the legal status of the aircraft had been the subject of debate from as early as the pioneering work of the French jurist Paul Fauchille in 1902 and had been frequently visited by early organisations such as, inter alia, the Comité International Technique d'Experts Juridiques Aériens (International Technical Committee of Aerial Legal Experts), the Institut de Droit International (Institute of International Law), the International Criminal Police Commission and the International Law Association. The question remained as one of the most important legal problems until the 13-year-long pre-legislative efforts of the International Civil Aviation Organization culminated in the Convention on Offenses and Certain Other Acts Committed on Board Aircraft coming into force on 4 December 1969.

There are very few subjects connected with the law of the Air on which lawyers have written so much or which they have discussed so often at International Conferences as Crimes on Aircraft.

— J. Richard Orme Wilberforce, "Crime in Aircraft", 67 Journal of the Royal Aeronautical Society, p. 175 (March 1963)

== ICAO ==
The Convention on International Civil Aviation at Article 43 established the International Civil Aviation Organization with the aim and objective at Article 44 " ...to develop the principles and techniques of international air navigation and to foster the planning and development of international air transport so as to ... [p]romote safety of flight in international air navigation... "

The legal committee of ICAO, established by the Interim Council on 24 June 1946 and approved by the First Assembly on 23 May 1947, acting on a proposal by the Mexican representative placed the question of the legal status of the aircraft on its work programme in 1950. The Committee appointed Dr. Enrique M. Loaeza (Mexico) as rapporteur on the subject. On 15 May 1953 the Council of ICAO raised the issue of the legal status and directed the Legal Commission to commence work on the matter. Accordingly, the Legal Council at its 9th Session, held at Rio de Janeiro 25 August to 12 September 1953 primarily to study and revise the text of a draft convention intending to replace the Warsaw Convention, established a sub-committee on the Legal Status of the Aircraft.

Legal Status of the Aircraft Sub-Committee

The Legal Status of the Aircraft Sub-Committee formed by the ICAO Legal Committee during its 9th Session held at Rio de Jainero was dedicated to studying the problems associated with crimes on aircraft. During the 10th Session of the Legal Committee in 1954, the Sub-Committee held meetings to determine the best procedure to be followed in the further consideration of the legal problems involved in studying the legal status of the aircraft. It was established that consideration ought to be given to the physical circumstances wherever the aircraft might be when a crime occurred, further considering the effect upon applicable law.

One of the important problems involved births:

Extract from ICAO News Release, 30 August 1956:

Under Belgian law a birth aboard a Belgian aircraft is considered to have taken place in Belgium. Under British law a birth aboard a British aircraft is considered to have taken place in Great Britain. However, if the aircraft is over French territory at the time, the birth is considered under French law to have taken place in France. In the latter case the child would thus have two nationalities and perhaps even a third, that of its father, if the latter is a national of a third State the laws of which provide that a child always takes the nationality of its legitimate father.

The situation would be quite different, however, if the birth occurred aboard a French aircraft in flight over the territory of a State other than France. A birth aboard a French aircraft over Belgian territory is considered to have occurred in France under both Belgian and French law. On the other hand, if the aircraft was flying over British territory at the moment the birth took place., the birth is considered by France to have taken place in British territory and by Great Britain to have taken place in France. In this case the child would have no nationality, unless the latter was determined by that of its parents.

Similar problems arise in the event of a crime. Offences committed aboard a Belgian aircraft are considered to have been committed in Belgium and are consequently governed by the Belgian penal code. However, if a Belgian alrcraft was flying over Switzerland when an offence was committed, the latter might also be subject to Swiss penal law which may provide entirely different penalties.

In addition to these legal difficulties, there are also major difficulties of a physical nature. When it is established that the territorial law is to apply to an act which occurs aboard an aircraft and that the latter flew, successively, over the territory of several States, it may be difficult, if not impossible, in view of the normal cruising speed of modern aircraft, to establish the exact geographic location where the act actually took place. Similarly, when a crime is committed aboard an aircraft in flight, and its commission extends over a period of time, it may be impossible to determine with certainty the State over whose territory the various parts of the crime were perpetrated and to specify the location where the parts deemed decisive under applicable law were performed.

Geneva Session, 1956

The Sub-Committee held its first plenary session in Geneva on 3 September 1956 armed with a list of the most important problems requiring an international solution. The Sub-Committee's work was greatly lessened by its agreement to limit the scope of the study to criminal aspects:

(1) acts which are crimes under the laws of the States of registration of the aircraft and the law of the State in which the act occurred;
(2) acts which are crimes according to the law of one of the States mentioned in (1) above.

While the matter of damage caused by aircraft to third parties on the ground had been handled by the Rome Convention, problems such as the nationality of aircraft, rights aboard aircraft, births, deaths, marriages, conclusion of contracts, drawing up of wills aboard aircraft in flight, etc. remained.

== Montreal Draft, 1958 ==
As a result of its study during its full second session done at Montreal in September 1958 the Sub-Committee developed the first ICAO Draft Convention on the Legal Status of the Aircraft focusing on the problem of crimes committed on board aircraft.

On the conflict of laws, the jurisdiction of the State of Registry was provided for in Article 3(1), as was the jurisdiction of overflown territorial States subject to some conditions.

== Munich Draft, 1959 ==
The Legal Committee at its 12th Session held in Munich considered the Draft Convention and Report of the September 1958 Sub-Committee session. The Munich Session had been intended to also examine the question of the Legal Status of the Aircraft Commander and a Draft Convention on Aerial Collisions.

As a result of its Session in Munich the Legal Committee drew up a Draft Convention on Offences and Other Acts Occurring on Board Aircraft. The Draft was comprehensive in scope containing provisions at Article 3 for the principle of jurisdiction over crimes in aircraft, at Article 4 for security against offenders being tried twice, at Articles 5 to 8 on the duties and the rights of the aircraft commander, of the members of the flight crew and of the passengers, at Article 9 for the immunity of certain actions taken on board aircraft, and at Articles 10 and 11 for the obligations and the rights of Contracting States. The Draft provided for the jurisdiction of the overflown territorial State, for the State of Landing and for the State of Registration of the aircraft.

Article 3(1) provided that "[i]ndependently of any applicable jurisdiction, the State of registration of the aircraft is competent to exercise jurisdiction over offences committed on board the aircraft." This provision paralleled maritime law in favour of the unworkable maxim cujus est solum, ejus est usque ad coelum et ad inferos and solved the problem of lex loci delicti commissi over the High Seas. The principle of the law of the flag had been proposed by Paul Fauchille in 1902 and 1910 and by the Belgian legal historian Fernand de Visscher in 1937.

Article 3(2) dealt with the jurisdiction of the territorial State and the State of Landing, providing:

The criminal jurisdiction of a State in whose airspace the offence was committed, if such State is not the State of registration of the aircraft or the State where the aircraft lands, shall not be exercised in connection with any offence committed on an aircraft in flight, except in the following cases:

(a) if the offence has effect on the territory of such State;
(b) if the offence has been committed by or against a national of such State;
(c) if the offence is against the national security of such State;
(d) if the offence consists of a breach of any rules and regulations relating to the flight and manœuvre of aircraft in force in such State;
(e) if the exercise of jurisdiction is necessary to ensure the observance of any obligation of such State under an international agreement.

If the overflown territorial State is neither the State of Registry nor the State of Landing, its jurisdiction is limited by subparagraphs (a) – (e). Subparagraph (a) was proposed by Fernand de Vissher at Article 1(3) of his 1937 report. Subparagraph (b) was proposed in Article 23 of the unadopted Draft Paris Convention of 1919 at the Peace Conference. Subparagraph (c) on the principle of national security had been proposed by Paul Fauchille in 1902. Subparagraph (d) corresponded to Article 23(2) of the Draft Paris Convention of 1919. Subparagraph (e) was therefore the only new concept.

Article 3(2) empowered the State of Landing to exercise jurisdiction over offences committed on board an aircraft. Although it had been proposed by Fernand de Visscher at Article 1(4) of his 1937 report submitted to the Luxembourg Session of the Institut de Droit International.

The Munich Draft thus established a means for concurrent jurisdiction of the three States. "Proposals to include a system of priority in the Munich draft have failed, partly because of the difficulty in finding agreement on the order of priority among the States concerned, and partly because the question of priority would be governed largely by the extent to which extradition treaties existed."

The Draft recognised, for the first time in the history of international air law, the power of the aircraft commander to take necessary action in the event that the safety of his aircraft and its passengers were jeopardised by the act of someone on board. It also recognised the commander's immunity were he to take some reasonable action under the circumstances. In addition it recognised the right of the commander to disembark any person endangering the safety of the flight or to deliver such person under restraint to the competent authorities of any Contracting State in which he may land; along with a provision for the country of disembarkation to detain the offending person according to its laws, to try him, to extradite him or to release him without delay.

Further provisions dealt with hijackings. States would agree to return a hijacked aircraft to any person lawfully entitled to it and to detain the hijacker(s) under national law to be tried under a competent jurisdiction.

== Montreal Redraft, 1962 ==
On 27 November 1961 the ICAO Council requested the Chairman of the Legal Committee to appoint a Sub-Committee on the Legal Status of the Aircraft to consider comments from States and from international organisations on the Münich Draft of 1959. The Legal Committee acted accordingly with the Sub-Committee convening in Montreal from 26 March to 5 April 1962. The Sub-Committee made some changes and offered substitute provisions in addition to new ones.

== Rome Draft, 1962 ==
During its 14th Session held in Rome in 1962 the Legal Committee after considering the Sub-Committee's report further studied and revised the Montreal Redraft. A Final Draft "Draft Convention on Offences and Certain Other Acts Committed on Board Aircraft" was prepared.

The US representative considered the principle ne bis in idem (double jeopardy) would fail to contribute to the solution to conflicts of jurisdiction, causing the committee to delete that provision. In addition to some other changes and drafting amendments the Montreal Redraft was retained. A new article dealing with the question of hijacking was introduced.

The Legal Committee considered its latest draft suitable for submission to a diplomatic conference and, in line with Section 1 of the Legal Committee's procedure for approval of draft conventions, transmitted it together with a report to the council.

The Rome Draft was placed before the International Conference on Air Law, Tokyo, on 20 August 1963, thus concluding decades of debates and negotiations of some of the foremost outstanding problems in international air law.

=== Tokyo Convention, 1963 ===
The Conference was finally convened at Tokyo by ICAO Council, 20 August to 14 September 1963 for the purpose of further consideration, finalisation, adoption and opening for signature of the Rome Draft. Sixty-one States and five international organisations were represented at the Conference.

During the discussions certain changes were made along with the addition of certain provisions, including the final clauses.

The Tokyo Convention emerged in present form on 14 September 1963. The Convention entered into force on 4 December 1969 bringing closure to the efforts of ICAO on the subject since 1950 and the realisation of many of the ideals of the early pioneering jurists present at the dawn of aviation.

But now we have one to 200 people flying together, commonly for four to seven hours, at times for 12 to 15 hours. They fly in conditions of security and comfort. They have room to move about. They include both sexes. They are plentifully supplied with alcoholic stimulants... and the purely statistical chances of abnormal behaviour are obviously greatly increased. Moreover, aircraft pass rapidly over frontiers which on land may be carefully controlled. They offer great opportunities for the transfer from one country to another... of commodities for which a high price will be paid and which cannot pass to their most profitable market by land or sea: things such as gold, drugs, diamonds, secret plans and designs. It is very tempting for passengers on these aircraft and for their crews to undertake or lend themselves as accessories to these trades.

— Sir Richard Orme Wilberforce, The International Technical Committee of Experts in Air Law, International L.Q., p 175 (1947)

== Ratifications ==
As of 2022, the Tokyo Convention has been ratified by 187 states. This total includes the Cook Islands and Niue plus all but nine of the member states of the United Nations. (The eight non-party states are Dominica, East Timor, Eritrea, Kiribati, Micronesia, Somalia, South Sudan, and Tuvalu.) The Holy See signed the treaty but has not ratified it.

== Notes ==
- Wybo Heere, International Bibliography of Air Law 1900-1971 (Leiden: A.W. Sijthoff; Doobs Ferry, NY: Oceana Publications Inc, 1972)

Wybo Heere, International Bibliography of Air Law Supplement 1972–1976 (Leiden: A.W. Sijthoff; Doobs Ferry, NY: Oceana Publications Inc, 1976)

- Alona E Evans and John Francis Murphy Legal Aspects of International Terrorism (Lexington, Massachusetts, and Toronto: Lexington Books, 1978)
- Arnold Kean (editor) Essays in Air Law Brill Academic Publishers (Leiden: Brill, 1982), Blackwell
- Law and Contemporary Problems, Vol. 30, No. 2, Unification of Law, pp. 400–424 (Chapter entitled: The International Unification of Air Law, Peter H. Sand) (Spring, 1965, Duke University School of Law)
- Cheng, The Law of International Air Transport (1962)
- Professor Jennings, International Law of the Air, 75 R.C.A.D.I. (1949).
- U.S. -v- Cordova: (1950) U.S. Av. R., p. 1; 87 F. Supp., p. 298.
- R. -v- Martin: (1956) 2 Q.B., p. 272; (1956) 2 W.L.R., p. 975.

== See also ==
- Hague Hijacking Convention
- SUA Act
- Beijing Convention
