= Ohio Patriot Act =

The Ohio Patriot Act, Ohio State Senate Bill Number 9 (SB 9), is an act passed in the U.S. state of Ohio on January 11, 2006. The act has many effects, many of which expand the powers of law enforcement in fighting terrorism. For instance, Section 2909.29 makes providing financial assistance to terrorist organizations a class four felony. Among its more controversial effects, this bill gives law enforcement officials authority to deny entry to individuals entering "transportation infrastructure" who will not provide identification when there is determined to be a security threat and officials are requiring identification from all individuals entering. The bill also gives law enforcement officials authority to demand the name, address and date of birth of any individual who is "reasonably suspected" of having committed any crime or having witnessed a felony. Failure to provide this information would be a misdemeanor under section 2921.29. Section 2909.32 would allow state agencies that issue licenses to require applicants to sign a declaration indicating that they have never provided material assistance to terrorist organizations. The provision would not apply to driving, hunting, fishing or other routine licenses but to licenses dealing with check cashiers, aircraft registration, emergency response personnel, food inspection, public water systems, charitable solicitations and the handling of hazardous materials.

On October 15, 2005, the amended bill passed the Ohio House of Representatives in a 69–23 vote. It was sent to the Ohio Senate to approve amendments made by the House, and the Senate passed the bill by a vote of 29–2. It was sent to Governor Bob Taft, who signed the bill into law on January 11, 2006. It went into effect on April 14, 2006.

== See also ==
- USA PATRIOT Act

== External links and references ==
- Full Text of SB9
- SB9 info from the ACLU
- Bill Would Allow Arrests For No Reason In Public Place (Newsnet5)
