= Counterterrorism Law of the People's Republic of China =

Law of China

Standing Committee of the National People's Congress
- Passed by: Standing Committee of the National People's Congress
- Passed: 27 December 2015
- Signed by: President Xi Jinping
- Signed: 27 December 2015
- Commenced: 1 November 2014

Legislative history
- Introduced by: Council of Chairpersons
- First reading: 27 October–1 November 2014
- Second reading: 25–27 February 2015
- Third reading: 21–27 December 2015
- Voting summary: 158 voted for; 1 voted against

Amends
- 2018
- Status: In force

Counterterrorism Law of the People's Republic of China
- Simplified Chinese: 中华人民共和国反恐怖主义法
- Traditional Chinese: 中華人民共和國反恐怖主義法
Transcriptions
Standard Mandarin
- Hanyu Pinyin: Zhōnghuá Rénmín Gònghéguó Fǎn Kǒngbùzhǔyì Fǎ

The Counterterrorism Law of the People's Republic of China is a legislation concerning terrorism in China. It was passed by the Standing Committee of the National People's Congress on 27 December 2015 came into effect on 1 January 2016. The law consists of 10 chapters and 97 articles, and provides for the identification, security precautions, intelligence information, investigation, response and disposal, international cooperation, safeguards, and legal liability of terrorist organizations and personnel.

== Legislative history ==
Prior to the enactment of the Counterterrorism Law, the PRC's anti-terrorism legal provisions were found in a number of laws, including the Criminal Law, the Criminal Procedure Law, the Anti-Money Laundering Law, the People's Armed Police Law, and the "Amendment (3) to the Criminal Law of the PRC" adopted on December 29, 2001, the National Security Law and its implementing rules, and the Decision of the Standing Committee of the National People's Congress on Strengthening Anti-Terrorism Work adopted at the 23rd meeting of the Standing Committee of the 11th National People's Congress on October 29, 2011. In addition, China has also signed and participated in a series of international anti-terrorism conventions, including the "Convention for the Suppression of Terrorist Bombings" and the "International Convention for the Suppression of the Financing of Terrorism". Anti-terrorism resolutions adopted by the United Nations Security Council, such as Resolutions 1267, 1373, 1333, and 1456, are also important bases for China's anti-terrorism activities.

Due to the high incidence of international terrorist activities and the infiltration and incitement of East Turkestan independence movement forces at home and abroad, the threat of violent terrorist activities in China has become increasingly prominent. Many violent terrorist cases have occurred, causing serious losses to the lives and property of the people and threatening China's national security, social stability, economic development, national unity and the safety of people's lives and property.

In October 2014, the 11th session of the Standing Committee of the 12th National People's Congress reviewed the Counterterrorism Law of the People's Republic of China for the first time. On November 3, 2014, the draft was published and public opinions were solicited. On February 25, 2015, the 13th session of the Standing Committee of the 12th National People's Congress reviewed the draft Counterterrorism Law for the second time.

On December 27, 2015, the 60th Chairperson's Meeting of the 12th NPC Standing Committee decided to submit the draft Counterterrorism Law to the closing meeting of the 18th Session of the 12th NPC Standing Committee for voting. On the same day, the closing meeting of the 18th Session of the 12th NPC Standing Committee was held. 159 people attended the meeting out of 168 who were supposed to attend. The Counterterrorism Law of the People's Republic of China was passed with 158 votes in favor and 1 vote against. On the same day, President Xi Jinping signed Presidential Order No. 36 to promulgate the law in accordance with the decision of the NPC Standing Committee, which came into effect on January 1, 2016.

== Provisions ==
Counterterrorism Law of the People's Republic of China

The Counterterrorism Law consists of 10 chapters and 97 articles, which provide for the identification of terrorist organizations and personnel, security precautions, intelligence information, investigation, response and disposal, international cooperation, safeguards, and legal responsibilities. It defines the system, mechanism, means, and measures of China's anti-terrorism work.

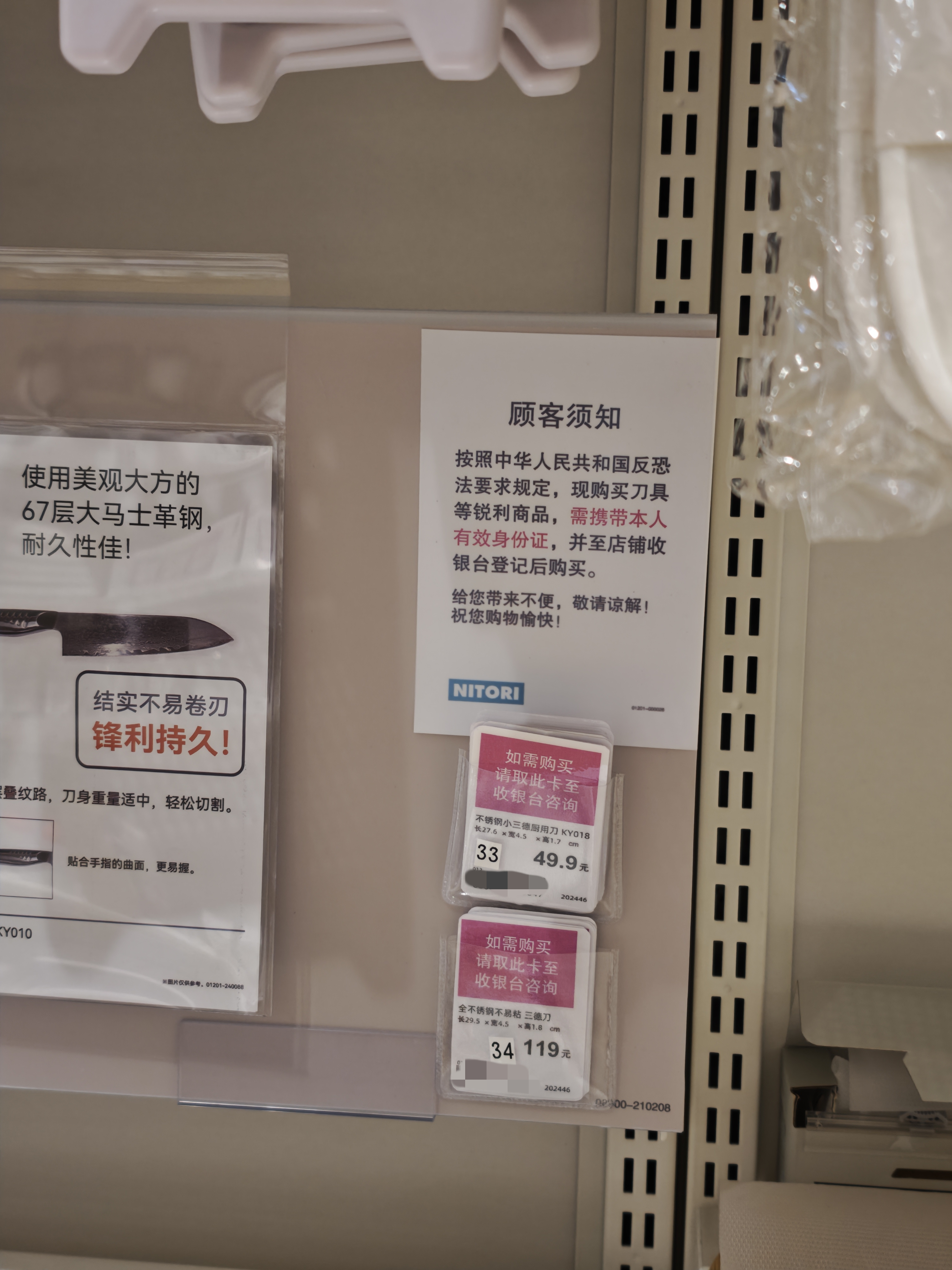
Instructions for purchasing knives based on Article 22 of the Counterterrorism Law

Article 3 provides a clear definition of terrorism, namely, "the advocacy and actions of achieving political, ideological and other purposes by means of violence, sabotage, intimidation and other means to create public panic, endanger public security, infringe upon personal property, or coerce state organs or international organizations."

== See also ==
- Terrorism in China
