= Protection of Diplomats Convention =

1973 United Nations anti-terrorism treaty

Convention on the Prevention and Punishment of Crimes Against Internationally Protected Persons, Including Diplomatic Agents
- Type: anti-terrorism, international criminal law, privileges and immunities; diplomatic relations
- Drafted: 14 December 1973
- Signed: 28 December 1973 (Note: First signed by the United States.)
- Location: New York, United States
- Effective: 20 February 1977
- Condition: 22 ratifications
- Signatories: 25
- Parties: 180
- Depositary: United Nations Secretary-General
- Languages: Chinese, English, French, Russian, and Spanish

The Protection of Diplomats Convention (formally, the Convention on the Prevention and Punishment of Crimes Against Internationally Protected Persons, Including Diplomatic Agents) is a United Nations anti-terrorism treaty that codifies some of the traditional principles on the necessity of protecting diplomats.

== Adoption ==
The convention was adopted as a resolution of the United Nations General Assembly on 14 December 1973 in response to a series of kidnappings and murders of diplomatic agents, beginning in the 1960s. It was drafted by the International Law Commission (ILC), which began work on it in 1971. It was adopted within two years, which was exceptionally fast by ILC standards.

== Content ==
Parties to the convention agree to criminalize the commission of murders or kidnappings of internationally protected persons as well as violent attacks against the official premises, private accommodation, or means of transport of such persons. Parties to the convention also agree to criminalize the attempted commission or threatened commission of such acts. "Internationally protected persons" is a term created by the convention, and refers explicitly to heads of state, heads of government, foreign ministers, ambassadors, other official diplomats, and members of their families.

A central provision of the convention is the principle of aut dedere aut judicare—that a party to the treaty must either (1) prosecute a person who commits an offence against an internationally protected person or (2) send the person to another state that requests his or her extradition for prosecution of the same crime.

== Ratifications and parties ==
By the end of 1974, the convention had been signed by 25 states and it came into force on 20 February 1977 after it had been ratified by 22 states. As of October 2016, it has been ratified by 180 state parties, which includes 177 United Nations member states plus the Holy See, Niue and the State of Palestine. The UN member states that have not ratified the convention are:

- Angola
- Chad
- Republic of the Congo
- East Timor
- Eritrea
- Gambia
- Indonesia
- Samoa
- Solomon Islands
- Somalia
- South Sudan
- Suriname
- Tanzania
- Tuvalu
- Vanuatu
- Zimbabwe

== Bibliography ==
- Blumenau, Bernhard (2014). The United Nations and Terrorism. Germany, Multilateralism, and Antiterrorism Efforts in the 1970s. Basingstoke: Palgrave Macmillan. pp. 104–114. ISBN 978-1-137-39196-4.
- Green, Allen B. (1973–1974). "Convention on the Prevention and Punishment of Crimes Against Diplomatic Agents and Other Internationally Protected Persons: An Analysis". Virginia Journal of International Law. 14: 703–728.
- Przetacznik, Franciszek (1974). "Convention on the prevention and punishment of crimes against internationally protected persons". Revue de droit international, de sciences diplomatiques et politiques. 52: 208–247.
- Wood, Michael C. (1974). "The Convention on the Prevention and Punishment of Crimes against Internationally Protected Persons, including Diplomatic Agents". International and Comparative Law Quarterly. 23 (4). Cambridge University Press: 791–817. doi:10.1093/iclqaj/23.4.791. JSTOR 758415.
