= United Nations Security Council Resolution 1540 =

2004 resolution on non-proliferation of WMDs

UN Security Council Resolution 1540
- Date: 28 April 2004
- Meeting no.: 4,956
- Code: S/RES/1540 (Document)
- Subject: Non-proliferation of weapons of mass destruction
- Voting summary: 15 voted for; None voted against; None abstained
- Result: Adopted

Security Council composition
- Permanent members: China; France; Russia; United Kingdom; United States
- Non-permanent members: Algeria; Angola; Benin; Brazil; Chile; Germany; Pakistan; Philippines; Romania; Spain

United Nations Security Council resolution 1540 was adopted unanimously on 28 April 2004 regarding the non-proliferation of weapons of mass destruction. The resolution establishes the obligations under Chapter VII of the United Nations Charter for all member states to develop and enforce appropriate legal and regulatory measures against the proliferation of chemical, biological, radiological, and nuclear weapons and their means of delivery, in particular, to prevent the spread of weapons of mass destruction to non-state actors.

It is notable in that it recognizes non-state proliferation as a threat to the peace under the terms of Chapter VII of the United Nations Charter, and creates an obligation for states to modify their internal legislation.

Furthermore, the resolution requires every state to criminalize various forms of non-state actor involvement in weapons of mass destruction and its related activities in its domestic legislation and, once in place, to enforce such legislation. By virtue of its universal scope and mandatory nature, resolution 1540 marks a departure from previous nonproliferation arrangements and adds a novel layer to the nonproliferation regime. Before the resolution was adopted, the non-proliferation regime was based on many partly overlapping arrangements, none of which established universal mandatory obligations.

== Content ==
Resolution 1540 was adopted under Chapter VII of the United Nations Charter, which covers "threats to the peace, breaches of the peace and acts of aggression." The resolution itself states in its opening paragraph: "proliferation of nuclear, chemical and biological weapons, as well as their means of delivery, constitutes a threat to international peace and security". Even though the security council had already recognized the proliferation of WMD as a threat to international peace and security in the UNSC Presidential Statement on 31 January 1992, it took the council until 2004 to adopt such a decisive resolution.

1540 is only the second resolution to invoke Chapter VII without relating the fact to a specific time and place, the first being United Nations Security Council Resolution 1373, which was voted in the aftermath of the September 11 attacks as an attempt to counter international terrorism. The possibility of terrorists accessing WMD was already considered in Resolution 1373 paragraph 3a and 4, and UNSCR 1540 emerged from those two paragraphs.

The three main obligations created by the resolution are:

1. To "refrain from providing any form of support to non-State actors that attempt to develop, acquire, manufacture, possess, transport, transfer or use nuclear, chemical or biological weapons and their means of delivery." (Article 1)
2. To "adopt and enforce appropriate effective laws which prohibit any non-State actor to manufacture, acquire, possess, develop, transport, transfer or use nuclear, chemical or biological weapons and their means of delivery". (Article 2)
3. To "take and enforce effective measures to establish domestic controls to prevent the proliferation of nuclear, chemical, or biological weapons and their means of delivery". (Article 3)

The resolution also emphasises the continuing importance of non-proliferation and disarmament agreements, and provides for the creation of a committee (the 1540 Committee) to oversee the implementation of the resolution. States are called upon to provide reports to the 1540 Committee on their current situation and future plans vis-à-vis the obligations laid out in the resolution within six months of the adoption of the resolution, though in reality many states took much longer.

The 1540 Committee was deliberately created without the power to impose sanctions. While the resolution is, in theory, obligatory for all members of the UN, it was decided that the implementation process should be based on collaboration and participation rather than enforcement. To further these ends, one of the main functions of the committee has been as a "clearing house" of offers and requests for assistance in fulfilling obligations created by the resolution.

=== 1540 committee ===
An ad-hoc committee (known as 1540 committee) for an initial mandate of 2 years under the Security Council charging the examination on the implementation of this resolution was established under paragraph 4 of the resolution. The committee released its first report to the Security Council on implementation of the resolution in April 2006. With the adoptions of Resolution 1673 (2006) and later Resolution 1810 (2008), its mandate was extended for a further two years and then another period of three years. Its mandate was extended for a further ten years by Resolution 1977 (2011), adopted in April 2011. The committee presented a second report in July 2008. As requested in Resolution 1810 (2008), the committee held an open meeting in 2009 with broad participation in order to prepare a comprehensive review of the status of the implementation of Resolution 1540.

=== National implementation ===
The resolution calls upon all States to present to the 1540 Committee a first report, not later than six-month from the adoption of the resolution 1540 (28 October 2004), on steps they have taken or intend to take to implement the provisions of operative paragraphs 1, 2 and 3 of the resolution. All Member States are also called upon to include in their national reports, as appropriate, information relating to the implementation of operative paragraphs 6,7,8, 9 and 10 of the resolution. They are also encouraged to prepare on a voluntary basis summary action plans mapping out their priorities and plans for implementing the key provisions of resolution 1540 (2004), and to submit those plans to the 1540 Committee. The resolution 1810 (2008) calls upon all States that have not yet presented a first report to as required in the resolution 1540 to submit it to the 1540 Committee without delay.

== Negotiations and vote ==
Resolution 1540 was adopted by the UN Security Council in response to the unmasking of the Abdul Qadeer Khan proliferation network but also with the aim of preventing the acquisition of chemical, biological, radiological, and nuclear weapons by terrorist groups.

Resolution 1540 is a notable development both in that it explicitly recognises non-state proliferation of weapons of mass destruction as a threat to peace and security in and of itself and in that it obliges member states to make internal legislative changes. Previous non-proliferation agreements all took the form of multilateral accords such as the Nuclear Non-proliferation Treaty or cooperation mechanisms such as the Proliferation Security Initiative, based on the consent of the parties. Resolution 1540, on the other hand, is obligatory for all UN members, whether or not they support its aims.

The resolution was sponsored by the United States, with the Philippines, Spain and France (which joined at the last minute) as co-sponsors. Negotiations leading up to the vote of resolution 1540 were officially open only to UN Security Council members, but information on the early drafts circulated with relative freedom and input from other states and NGOs was solicited due to the political sensitivity of the issues involved. Special attention was paid to the principal non-aligned states in order to put pressure on Pakistan, at the time a member of the Security Council, to fall in line with the majority opinion. The G8 was also included in the process, this being a means of including Japan in the negotiations. The drafting process was notable for the level of participation by NGOs that it involved. A grassroots mobilisation was organised by, among others, the Women’s International League for Peace and Freedom, Abolition 2000 and the Lawyers' Committee on Nuclear Policy, demanding that the draft resolution be debated in an open session of the Security Council.

The resolution was voted unanimously by the permanent members of the Security Council, plus the 10 non-permanent members at the time: Algeria, Benin, Angola, the Philippines, Pakistan, Brazil, Chile, Germany, Spain and Romania. The entire process, from the beginning of negotiations among the co-sponsors to the final vote took around 8 months.

Despite the unanimity of the vote several Security Council members expressed reserves in their accompanying statements. Representing Pakistan, Munir Akram insisted that, "Pakistan shared the view expressed in the Council’s open debate that the Council could not legislate for the world, he said. The Council could not assume the stewardship of global non-proliferation and disarmament issues. Composed of 15 States, it was not a representative body. It could not enforce the obligations assumed by five of its members which retained nuclear weapons since they also possessed the right of veto." He added that "Pakistan had been obliged to develop nuclear weapons and related delivery systems to maintain credible minimum deterrence against external aggression, especially once similar capabilities had been developed and demonstrated by its eastern neighbour. The nuclear non-proliferation regime needed to accommodate the reality of the existence of nuclear weapons in South Asia. Given that reality, Pakistan would not accept any demand for access, much less inspections, of its nuclear and strategic assets, materials and facilities, he said. It would not share technical, military or political information that would negatively affect its national security programmes or its national interests. Pakistan would continue to develop its nuclear, missiles and related strategic capability to maintain the minimum credible deterrence vis-à-vis its eastern neighbour, which was embarked on major programmes for nuclear weapons, missiles, anti-missiles and conventional arms acquisition and development."

India also stated its concern over the apparent interference in internal legislation by the Security Council: "We are concerned that the exercise of legislative functions by the Council, combined with recourse to Chapter VII mandates, could disrupt the balance of power between the General Assembly and the Security Council, as enshrined in the Charter."

Speaking for Brazil, Ronaldo Mota Sardenberg brought up the question of disarmament, which had been a concern of many non-aligned movement countries throughout the negotiation process and before, given the inegalitarian regime created by instruments such as the Nuclear Non-Proliferation Treaty.

Equally, the early drafts of the resolution contained explicit references to the Proliferation Security Initiative which were removed at the request of China, which remains opposed to the scheme, alleging that it violates the UN Convention on the Law of the Sea.

== Relationship to other non-proliferation instruments ==
Resolution 1540 requires states to "promote the universal adoption and full implementation, and, where necessary, strengthening of multilateral treaties to which they are parties, whose aim is to prevent the proliferation of nuclear, biological or chemical weapons" (Article 8a) and to "fulfil their commitment to multilateral cooperation, in particular within the framework of the International Atomic Energy Agency, the Organisation for the Prohibition of Chemical Weapons, and the Biological and Toxin Weapons Convention" (Article 8c).

Although the resolution encourages and promotes universal WMD treaty implementation, states not yet a party retain their prerogative not to sign these treaties. The focus of Resolution 1540 is not the treaties per se but the resulting national legislation and regulations that allow to take action against non-state actors. States will have gone a long way toward complying with the resolution if they have already ratified the three main WMD treaties, but the reverse is also true. If States put the required national legislation in place to comply with UNSCR 1540, then becoming state party of and complying with the Chemical Weapons Convention and the Biological and Toxin Weapons Convention will not demand much additional effort. In this way the resolution also contributes to treaty universality.

Resolution 1540 tries to fill gaps in the varying approaches of existing instruments. First of all, the resolution is universal unlike the three main WMD treaties. Whereas the three main WMD treaties, the Non-Proliferation Treaty, the CWC and the BTWC are first and foremost applicable to states, the resolution focuses on non-state actors. Because individuals are not subject to international law, states are required to ensure a national legal framework of laws, regulations and controls. Third, unlike the IAEA to the NPT and the OPCW to the CWC, there exists no such organization to the BTWC.

Similarly, for the means of delivery, there only exists a regime so these delivery systems are not the subject of legally binding non-proliferation treaties. Resolution 1540 explicitly integrates proliferation concerns about these means. The resolution goes beyond the three main non-proliferation treaties and specifies in article 2 and 3 the additional measures required concerning financial, security, and physical protection of sensitive materials and also border and export controls. Lastly, the Resolution, adopted under Chapter VII of the United Nations Charter, requires enforcement. This emphasizes the role states are expected to play to pre-empt proliferation (article 10), because it hints at the possibility of sanctions in case of non-compliance. It also tries to address the enforcement weakness in the treaties and export control regimes.

=== Nuclear weapons ===
Resolution 1540 has a complementary relationship to the NPT and the IAEA. The IAEA has activities and programs that are relevant to the implementation of the resolution 1540 such as legislative assistance, training of state officials, support to states in the development and implementation of physical protection of nuclear material and facilities and support to states to upgrade border controls in order to better detect illicit trafficking of nuclear material and related technology. The 1540 Committee can inform states about requesting legislative and technical assistance and advisory services from the IAEA. The IAEA does not only cover nuclear material but also radioactive material, the latter is of special interest to non-state actors, because it would be easier to obtain. Another useful tool provided by the IAEA is their Incident and Trafficking Database (ITDB).

=== Chemical weapons ===
The CWC and its mandated organization the OPCW face new challenges in a changing international WMD context which Resolution 1540 aims to remedy. An important obligation of the CWC is the adoption of appropriate national implementing legislation, but even after the adoption of an action plan by the OPCW to encourage state parties to rectify this situation, many states parties fail to meet this obligation. Comprehensive national implementing legislation is not only necessary to fully meet the obligations to the CWC, but it is vital in preventing non-state actors from gaining access to chemical weapons and UNSCR 1540 has rendered it a mandatory requirement. Although the CWC has an effective verification regime by international inspectors of the OPCW, this may not always be the case when faced with non-state actors if there exists no national legislation that grants easy access to private residences. The resolution also addresses the question of "related materials". Its definition includes chemicals and equipment covered by multilateral arrangements and national control lists such as the Australia Group, the Proliferation Security Initiative and the EU’s strategy against the proliferation of WMD, and is thus much broader than the three schedules of chemicals in the Annex of the CWC. In addition non-state actors can already cause serious damage with amounts that are far below those that are considered militarily significant and states should consider this in their actions to counteract the preparation or use of chemical weapons by those actors.

=== Biological weapons ===
As said before, the BTWC has no organization to oversee its implementation and lacks an effective monitoring, compliance and verification regime. There exists a modest consultative compliance mechanism, but negotiations to establish an international organization for the prohibition of biological weapons to oversee implementation and conduct monitoring and verification have broken down in 2001. The lack of transparency make it difficult to assess the status and effectiveness of states parties' measures to implement and comply with the BTWC. UNSCR 1540 has established a monitoring system based on states' declarations on implementation through the reports provided to the 1540 Committee. The resolution does not provide a compliance regime, but rather favors cooperative efforts since non-compliance can be caused by lack of awareness or capacity. But if states persist in their non-compliance despite assistance, then the committee will report this to the UNSC. Resolution 1540 also fulfills a function compliance role since it requires BTWC states parties to review their compliance with its obligations while they can use the more detailed criteria for national implementation in the resolution.

=== Means of delivery ===
UNSCR 1540 promotes a greater understanding of non-proliferation instruments related to means of delivery such as the Missile Technology Control Regime (MTCR). Up to the adoption of the resolution export control measures related to means of delivery had not been discussed widely in the international community. The MTCR is an informal and voluntary association that aims to control the proliferation of rockets and unmanned air vehicle systems. Resolution 1540 requires as one of the measures that states maintain effective export controls and although every country can implement the arrangements according to its national legislation, this legislation is now mandatory. Since the principal focus of the resolution are non-state actors, means of delivery are expected to be less sophisticated means. The risk of non-state actors obtaining sophisticated ballistic or cruise missile technologies continues to exist and the Resolution will have to take into account the dual-use technologies in its implementation so as not to affect legitimate peaceful commercial uses and industrial research.

== Application ==
=== South America ===
Latin America was the first region to be covered by a treaty banning the development of nuclear weapons (the Treaty of Tlatelolco), despite the longstanding opposition of two of the principal powers of the region, Brazil and Argentina, to the Nuclear Non-proliferation Treaty, due to its perceived discriminatory nature.

While Colombia is the only state in the region to have fully accepted the United States vision of the war on terror, most states in the region already have anti-terrorism measures in place, usually in conjunction with policies designed to fight organised crime, which is the main local threat (for example, the 3+1 Group, the Inter-American Convention Against Terrorism, the Declaration of San Carlos).

All of the states in the region have already presented their compliance reports to the 1540 Committee. Many of them have, however, fulfilled only a minor part of their obligations under the resolution; Chile, Panama, Peru and Venezuela being among those with the worst records. Colombia has also requested detection equipment and assistance in training its law enforcement personnel in the detection and prosecution of proliferation offenses, while Argentina and Brazil have provided offers of assistance.

=== Asia and Oceania ===
While ASEAN has been largely supportive of the resolution, it has also been criticised firstly as a US-inspired attempt to interfere in matters belonging to the domain of national sovereignty, as a "one size fits all" approach to the question and for being far too demanding in terms of resources for small countries to implement correctly.

Among the states of the region, Taiwan (which is not a UN member), the Cook Islands and Niue (which are treated as permanent observers rather than members of the UN due to their links with New Zealand), North Korea, Burma, East Timor and the Solomon Islands have yet to present reports to the 1540 Committee. Many of the states in Oceania have had difficulties fulfilling their obligations under the resolution due to their small size and lack of resources. For example, Kiribati has asked for assistance in adapting its legislative framework and Vanuatu has asked for additional police training.

Armenia, Cambodia, Iraq, Lebanon, the Marshall Islands, Mongolia, the Philippines, Qatar, Syria, Thailand and Uzbekistan all currently have requests for assistance pending, while Australia, China, India, Israel, Japan, Malaysia, New Zealand, Pakistan, South Korea, and Singapore have all presented offers of assistance to the committee.

Many states in the region are also involved in other local non-proliferation and counter-terrorism initiatives, such as the Bali Counter-Terrorism Process and the BTWC Regional Workshops.

Asia has been the source of most recent proliferation activities, notably in India and Pakistan, Israel, Iran and North Korea, and those involving the A. Q. Khan network.

=== Africa ===
While most African states lack the technology to be serious proliferation threats, the numerous zones of lawlessness on the continent make it a useful hub for various clandestine activities, notably drug and people trafficking. However, certain countries, notably Libya and Egypt (nuclear) and the Democratic Republic of the Congo (chemical/biological) have been or are suspected of being involved in proliferation.

Africa also has the highest proportion of states not yet having presented their compliance reports to the 1540 committee.

This has largely been attributed to a lack of resources, and the existence of more pressing problems such as AIDS, small arms proliferation and conflict, but certain members of the non-aligned movement have also raised concerns over the possible impact of the resolution on national sovereignty.

Angola, Benin, Côte d'Ivoire, Madagascar and Morocco have all presented requests for assistance in fulfilling their 1540 obligations to the committee, with South Africa providing an offer of help.

=== Europe ===
Since 2003 the European Union has integrated a non-proliferation clause into its common foreign and security policy, requiring that its trading partners take steps to "sign, ratify or accede to, as appropriate, and fully implement all (…) relevant international instruments" relating to nuclear, chemical and biological weapons". This clause has, however, been a stumbling block in negotiations with India and Syria.

The only European countries yet to present their reports to the 1540 committee are Macedonia, Moldova and the Vatican City (which remains merely an observer state at the UN), although many ex-Soviet states lack the effective border controls needed to prevent proliferation while still possessing nuclear, chemical or biological materials. Albania, Lithuania, Montenegro and Serbia have requested assistance in fulfilling their obligations under the resolution, whereas a majority of European states have provided offers of help: Austria, Belarus, Bulgaria, the Czech Republic, Denmark, Estonia, Finland, France, Germany, Greece, Hungary, Ireland, Italy, Liechtenstein, Lithuania, Luxembourg, Malta, the Netherlands, Norway, Poland, Portugal, Romania, the Russian Federation, Slovakia, Slovenia, Spain, Sweden and the United Kingdom.

=== North America ===
The United States has been one of the strongest supporters of resolution 1540 and of United Nations Security Council Resolution 1887, which strengthened its provisions.

All North American states except Haiti and St Lucia have presented their reports on 1540 compliance to the UN. The Bahamas, Belize, CARICOM and Guatemala have requested assistance in implementing the resolution while Canada, Cuba and the United States have offered help.

== Controversy ==
Many states in the non-aligned movement have criticised resolution 1540 for being cumbersome and ill-adapted to their situations, an attempt by the US to co-opt others into its war on terror, interference by the UN in states' national sovereignty and a drain on resources that could better be used on problems that are of more direct local relevance.

Supporters of the resolution have underlined the function of the 1540 committee as a clearing house for offers of and requests for assistance in implementing the resolution, and pointed out that improved border controls and legislative framework will be of a more general benefit to all countries that implement them.

== See also ==
- Bureau of International Security and Nonproliferation
- Chemical, biological, radiological, and nuclear
- List of United Nations Security Council Resolutions 1501 to 1600 (2003–2005)
- Nuclear Non-proliferation Treaty
- Terrorism
