= Beijing Convention =

2010 multilateral aviation treaty

Convention on the Suppression of Unlawful Acts Relating to International Civil Aviation
- Type: Aviation, international criminal law, anti-terrorism
- Drafted: 10 September 2010
- Signed: 10 September 2010
- Location: Beijing, China
- Effective: 1 July 2018
- Condition: 22 ratifications
- Signatories: 34
- Parties: 45
- Depositary: Secretary General of the International Civil Aviation Organization
- Languages: English, Arabic, Chinese, French, Russian and Spanish

The Beijing Convention (formally, the Convention on the Suppression of Unlawful Acts Relating to International Civil Aviation) is a 2010 treaty by which state parties agree to criminalise certain terrorist actions against civil aviation.

== Creation and entry into force ==
The convention was concluded on 10 September 2010 at the Diplomatic Conference on Aviation Security in Beijing. (At the same conference, the Protocol Supplementary to the Convention for the Suppression of Unlawful Seizure of Aircraft was adopted.) Parties that ratify the Convention agree to criminalise using civil aircraft as a weapon and using dangerous materials to attack aircraft or other targets on the ground. The illegal transport of biological, chemical, and nuclear weapons is also criminalised under the convention.

The negotiation of a new aviation security treaty that would address emerging threats to aviation was in part prompted by the September 11 attacks. At the conclusion of the conference, the U.S. delegate stated that "[o]n the eve of the anniversary of the 9/11 terrorist attacks, the United States can think of no more fitting and hopeful way to mark that occasion than with the adoption of these two new major counterterrorism instruments."

The treaty entered into force on 1 July 2018 following Turkey's accession thereto. It has been signed by 34 states and ratified or acceded to by 45 (as of January 2023).

== See also ==
- Tokyo Convention
- Hague Hijacking Convention
- Hostages Convention
- SUA Act
