= Inter-American Convention Against Terrorism =

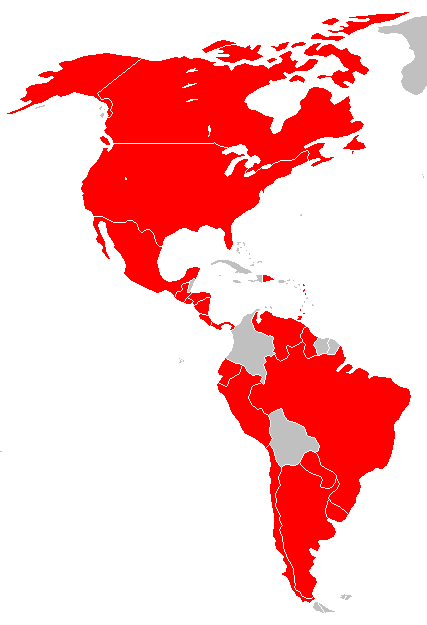
- Parties to the treaty
- Signed: 3 June 2002
- Location: Bridgetown, Barbados
- Effective: 6 July 2003
- Condition: 6 ratifications
- Signatories: 33
- Parties: 24
- Depositary: General Secretariat of the Organization of American States
- Languages: English, French, Portuguese, and Spanish

The Inter-American Convention Against Terrorism was adopted by the member countries of the Organization of American States (OAS) at its General Assembly held in Bridgetown, Barbados, on 3 June 2002. The convention, negotiated pursuant to a mandate from the OAS Foreign Ministers shortly after the terrorist attacks of 11 September 2001 in the United States, reflects the Americas' hemispheric-wide commitment to enhancing cooperation in the fight against terrorism.

In brief, the convention:

- Improves regional cooperation in the fight against terrorism, thereby enhancing hemispheric security.
- Commits parties to endeavor to sign and ratify the relevant U.N. anti-terrorism instruments (a major element in U.N. Security Council Resolution 1373).
- Commits parties to use the recommendations of the Financial Action Task Force (FATF) and other specialized entities as guidelines in taking measures to prevent, combat and eradicate the financing of terrorism.
- Denies safe haven to suspected terrorists, both as refugees and asylum-seekers, and denies use of the political offense exception by suspected terrorists to prevent extradition or rendering of mutual legal assistance.
- Extends the terrorist acts covered under the relevant U.N. anti-terrorism instruments to financial crimes (e.g., money laundering) and other provisions of the U.N.'s Convention Against Transnational Organized Crime. The OAS Convention thus elaborates for regional use a variety of legal tools that have proven effective against transnational organized crime in recent years.
- Enhances cooperation in a number of areas, including: exchanges of information on border control measures and law enforcement actions; appointment of a single national point of contact as liaison with other states and relevant bodies; exchanges of experience and training; technical assistance; and mutual legal assistance.
- Demonstrates regional solidarity in fight against terrorism.
- Facilitates the implementation of a number of the mandates in U.N. Security Council Resolution 1373 and expands the signatory states' ability to act upon some of the recommendations set forth in the Resolution.

To date, the convention has been signed by 33 of the 34 active member states and ratified by 24.

Convention oversight is the task of the OAS's Inter-American Committee Against Terrorism.

== Sources ==
The original version of this article was in part adapted from Inter-American Convention Against Terrorism, a public domain publication of the United States government.
