= Aut dedere aut judicare =

Legal obligation of states under public international law

In law, the principle of aut dedere aut judicare (Latin for "either extradite or prosecute") refers to the legal obligation of states under public international law to prosecute persons who commit serious international crimes where no other state has requested extradition. However, the Lockerbie case demonstrated that the requirement to extradite or prosecute is not a rule of customary international law. The obligation arises regardless of the extraterritorial nature of the crime and regardless of the fact that the perpetrator and victim may be of alien nationality. It is generally included as part of international treaties dealing with an array of transnational crimes to facilitate bringing perpetrators to justice.

== Rationale ==
The rationale for this principle is to ensure that there are no jurisdictional gaps in the prosecution of internationally committed crimes. It is, however, unusual for states to be required to exercise this jurisdiction because often another state party will have an interest in the matter, and so will apply for extradition of the defendant(s). In this situation the state requesting extradition will have priority.

The obligation of aut dedere aut judicare for all crimes is however not assured, and Stigall notes that "some contemporary scholars hold the opinion that aut dedere aut judicare is not an obligation under customary international law but rather 'a specific conventional clause relating to specific crimes' and, accordingly, an obligation that only exists when a state has voluntarily assumed the obligation." But in the international crimes for which it is applied, it is "posited [by Cherif Bassiouni] that ... it is not only a rule of customary international law but a jus cogens principle", compelling states to invoke it for any and all crimes that fall under the principle; Kelly finds within Israeli and Austrian judicial decisions "some supporting anecdotal evidence that judges within national systems are beginning to apply the doctrine on their own."

== Typical offences ==
Typically offences classified as falling under the aut dedere aut judicare principle include:

- Hijacking of civilian aircraft
- Taking of civilian hostages
- Acts of terrorism
- Torture
- Crimes against diplomats and other "internationally protected persons", and;
- Financing of terrorism and other international crimes

== Multilateral treaties ==
The majority of these offences rely on multilateral treaties to extend the "prosecute or extradite" principle to them. This method of granting jurisdiction has become increasingly common since World War II. Jurisdiction granting treaties include:

- The Geneva Conventions of 1949;
- Hague Convention for the Suppression of Unlawful Seizure of Aircraft 1970;
- International Convention Against the Taking of Hostages 1979;
- International Convention for the Suppression of Terrorist Bombings 1997;
- International Convention on the Suppression of the Financing of Terrorism 1999;
- Convention Against Torture and Other Cruel, Inhuman or Degrading Treatment 1984;
- The Convention on the Prevention and Punishment of Crimes Against Internationally Protected Persons 1973;
- United Nations Convention against Corruption 2003;
- Hague Convention for the Protection of Cultural Property in the Event of Armed Conflict 1954, and;
- International Convention for the Suppression and Punishment of the Crime of Apartheid 1973.
