= Hostages Convention =

1979 international criminal law treaty

International Convention against the Taking of Hostages
- Type: International criminal law, anti-terrorism
- Drafted: 17 December 1979
- Signed: 18 December 1979
- Location: New York
- Effective: 3 June 1983
- Condition: 22 ratifications
- Signatories: 39
- Parties: 176
- Depositary: UN Secretary-General
- Languages: Chinese, English, French, Russian and Spanish

The Hostages Convention (formally the International Convention against the Taking of Hostages) is a United Nations treaty by which states agree to prohibit and punish hostage taking. The treaty includes definitions of "hostage" and "hostage taking" and sets out the principle of aut dedere aut judicare: a party to the treaty must prosecute a hostage taker if no other state requests extradition for prosecution of the same crime.

== Creation and entry into force ==
The creation of an anti-hostage-taking treaty was a project initiated by the Federal Republic of Germany in 1976. The convention was adopted on 17 December 1979 by the issuance of Resolution 34/1461 by the UN General Assembly. By the end of 1980, it had been signed by 39 states and it came into force on 3 June 1983 after it had been ratified by 22 states. As of October 2016, the convention has 176 state parties.

== State parties ==
The convention has 176 state parties, which includes 175 UN members plus Niue. The 19 UN member states that are not parties to the treaty are:

- Angola
- Burundi
- Republic of the Congo
- Democratic Republic of the Congo
- East Timor
- Eritrea
- Gambia
- Indonesia
- Israel
- Maldives
- Samoa
- Solomon Islands
- Somalia
- South Sudan
- Syria
- Tuvalu
- Vanuatu
- Zimbabwe

Of these 19 states, the convention has been signed but not ratified by the DR Congo and Israel. Other non-state-parties include the Holy See and the Cook Islands (though New Zealand's ratification states that it applies to the Cook Islands and Niue (but not Tokelau)).

=== Former state parties and successions ===
Former state parties that were not formally succeeded by any existing state include Czechoslovakia, East Germany, and Yugoslavia. A number of states ratified but have since been succeeded by new states: Serbia ratified as the Federal Republic of Yugoslavia; Russia ratified as the Soviet Union; Belarus ratified as the Byelorussian SSR; and Ukraine ratified as the Ukrainian SSR.
