= Hague Hijacking Convention =

1970 multilateral treaty

Convention for the Suppression of Unlawful Seizure of Aircraft
- Type: Aviation, international criminal law, anti-terrorism
- Drafted: September/October 1969
- Signed: 16 December 1970
- Location: The Hague, Netherlands
- Effective: 14 October 1971
- Condition: 10 ratifications
- Signatories: 75
- Parties: 187
- Depositary: Governments of the United Kingdom, United States, and Russia (originally the Soviet Union)
- Languages: English, French, Russian and Spanish

The Hague Hijacking Convention (formally the Convention for the Suppression of Unlawful Seizure of Aircraft) is a multilateral treaty by which states agree to prohibit and punish aircraft hijacking. The convention does not apply to customs, law enforcement or military aircraft, thus it applies exclusively to civilian aircraft. The convention only addresses situations in which an aircraft takes off or lands in a place different from its country of registration. The convention sets out the principle of aut dedere aut judicare—that a party to the treaty must prosecute an aircraft hijacker if no other state requests his or her extradition for prosecution of the same crime.

== Creation and entry into force ==
The convention was adopted by the International Conference on Air Law at The Hague on 16 December 1970. It came into force on 14 October 1971 after it had been ratified by 10 states. As of 2025, the convention has 187 state parties.

== State parties ==
The convention has 187 state parties, which includes 185 UN members plus the Cook Islands and Niue. The 8 UN member states that are not parties to the treaty are:

- Burundi
- East Timor
- Eritrea
- Kiribati
- Federated States of Micronesia
- Solomon Islands
- South Sudan
- Tuvalu

Of these 8 states, the convention has been signed but not ratified by Burundi.

=== Former state parties and successions ===
Former state parties that were not formally succeeded by any existing state include Czechoslovakia, East Germany, South Vietnam, and Yugoslavia. A number of states ratified but have since been succeeded by new states: Serbia ratified as the Federal Republic of Yugoslavia; Russia ratified as the Soviet Union; Belarus ratified as the Byelorussian SSR; and Ukraine ratified as the Ukrainian SSR. Prior to the unification of Yemen, both North and South Yemen had ratified the convention. The Republic of China signed and ratified the agreement; in 1980, the People's Republic of China approved the treaty with a statement that it declared the Republic of China's actions with respect to the convention "null and void".

== 2010 Protocol ==
In 2010 in Beijing, the Protocol Supplementary to the Convention for the Suppression of Unlawful Seizure of Aircraft was adopted. The Protocol makes amendments and additions to the original convention. As September 2018, the Protocol has been ratified by 27 states. It entered into force on 1 January 2018.

== See also ==
- Tokyo Convention
- Convention for the Suppression of Unlawful Acts against the Safety of Maritime Navigation
- Beijing Convention
- LOT Flight 165 hijacking#Trial
