= List of international presidential trips made by Nicolás Maduro =

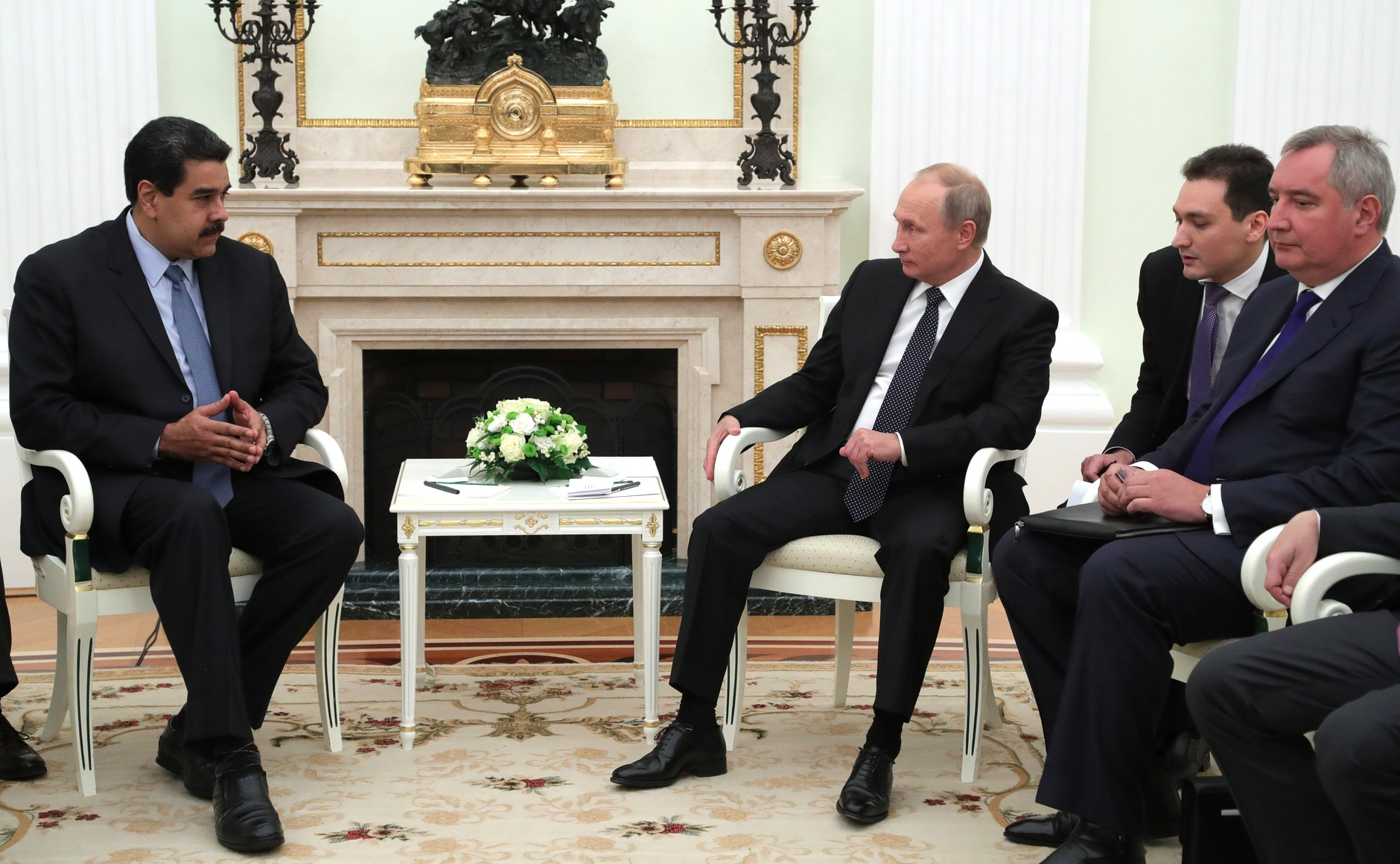
Nicolás Maduro with Vladimir Putin in Moscow (2017)

This is a list of international presidential trips made by Nicolás Maduro, the 53rd and current President of Venezuela. As of September 2025, Maduro has made 86 international trips to 38 countries during his presidency so far, which began on 19 April 2013. Maduro did not make any international trips between 2020 and September 2021, due to the COVID-19 pandemic.

== Summary ==
The number of visits per country where President Maduro traveled are:

- One visit to Argentina, Belarus, Colombia, Costa Rica, Dominica, the Dominican Republic, Egypt, France, Grenada, Haiti, Italy, Kuwait, Panama, Peru, Saint Kitts and Nevis, Saint Lucia, Uruguay and Vietnam
- Two visits to Algeria, Azerbaijan, Bolivia, Jamaica, Saint Vincent and the Grenadines, Suriname, Trinidad and Tobago and the Vatican City
- Three visits to China, Ecuador, Mexico, and Saudi Arabia.
- Four visits to Brazil, Iran, Nicaragua, Qatar, Turkey and the United States.
- Seven visits to Russia
- Ten visits to Cuba

== 2013 ==
Country	Areas visited	Date(s)	Notes
Peru	Lima	18 April	Attended the UNASUR extraordinary meeting.
Uruguay	Montevideo	7-8 May	Working visit. Met with President José Mujica. Delivered a speech at the Plenario Intersindical de Trabajadores – Convención Nacional de Trabajadores.
Argentina	Buenos Aires	8-9 May	Working visit. Met with President Cristina Fernández de Kirchner.
Brazil	Brasília	9-10 May	Working visit. Met with President Dilma Rousseff.
Ecuador	Quito	24 May	Attended the inauguration ceremony of President Rafael Correa.
Bolivia	Cochabamba	25 May	Working visit. Met with President Evo Morales.
Nicaragua	Managua	2 June	Working visit. Met with President Daniel Ortega.
Italy	Rome	16-19 June	Official visit. Met with President Giorgio Napolitano.
Vatican City	Vatican City	17 June	Official visit. Met with Pope Francis.
France	Paris	19-21 June	Official visit. Met with President François Hollande.
Haiti	Port-au-Prince	26 June	Working visit. Met with President Michel Martelly.
Nicaragua	Managua	29 June	Attended the 8th Petrocaribe Summit.
Russia	Moscow	2-3 July	Working visit. Met with President Vladimir Putin.
Belarus	Minsk	3 July	Working visit. Met with President Alexander Lukashenko.
Suriname	Paramaribo	30 August	Attended the UNASUR summit.

== 2014 ==
Country	Areas visited	Date(s)	Notes
Cuba	Havana	28-29 January	Attended the CELAC summit.
Brazil	Fortaleza	14-17 July	Attended the BRICS-UNASUR summit.
United States	New York City	24 September	Addressed the general debate of the sixty-ninth session of the United Nations General Assembly.
Ecuador	Guayaquil	4 December	Attended the UNASUR summit.

== 2015 ==
Country	Areas visited	Date(s)	Notes
Iran	Tehran	10 January	Working visit. Met with President Hassan Rouhani.
Saudi Arabia	Riyadh	10-11 January	Working visit. Met with Crown Prince Salman bin Abdulaziz al-Saud.
Algeria	Algiers	11-12 January	Working visit.
Qatar	Doha	12-14 January	Official visit. Met with Emir Tamim bin Hamad Al Thani and Deputy Emir Abdullah bin Hamad Al Thani.
Bolivia	La Paz	22 January	Attended the third inauguration ceremony of President Evo Morales.
Costa Rica	San José	28-29 January	Attended the 2015 CELAC summit.
Trinidad and Tobago	Port of Spain	24 February	Working visit. Met with President Anthony Carmona and Prime Minister Kamla Persad-Bissessar.
Panama	Panama City	10-11 April	Attended the 7th Summit of the Americas.
Russia	Moscow	8-9 May	Attended the 2015 Moscow Victory Day Parade.
Brazil	Brasília	17-18 July	Attended the Mercosur summit.
Vietnam	Hanoi	30-31 August	Official visit. Met with President Trương Tấn Sang.
China	Beijing	3 September	Attended the 2015 China Victory Day Parade.
Qatar	Doha	4 September	Working visit. Met with Emir Tamim bin Hamad Al Thani.
Jamaica	Montego Bay	5 September	Attended the 10th Petrocaribe Summit.
Dominica	Roseau	23-24 September	Working visit. Met with Prime Minister Roosevelt Skerrit. Discussed efforts to provide relief following Tropical Storm Erika.
Saint Kitts and Nevis	Basseterre	24-25 September	Working visit. Met with Prime Minister Timothy Harris.
United States	New York City	25-29 September	Addressed the general debate of the seventieth session of the United Nations General Assembly.
Suriname	Paramaibo	16-17 October	Working visit. Met with President Desi Bouterse.
Saint Lucia	Castries	17 October	Working visit. Met with Prime Minister Kenny Anthony.
Grenada	St. George's	17-18 October	Official visit. Met with Prime Minister Keith Mitchell.
Iran	Tehran	22-23 November	Attended the Third GECF summit. Met on the sidelines with Russian President Vladimir Putin.

== 2016 ==
Country	Areas visited	Date(s)	Notes
Ecuador	Quito	26-27 January	Attended the CELAC summit.
Cuba	Havana	18 March	Working visit. Awarded the Order of José Martí.
Jamaica	Kingston	21-22 May	Working visit. Met with Prime Minister Andrew Holness.
Trinidad and Tobago	Port of Spain	23 May	Working visit. Met with Prime Minister Keith Rowley.
Cuba	Havana	23 June	Attended the signing ceremony of the Colombian Peace Accords.
Colombia	Cartagena	26 September	Attended the signing ceremony of the final peace accord between FARC and the government of Colombia. Met with U.S. Secretary of State John Kerry.
Turkey	Istanbul	9-13 October	Attended the 23rd World Energy Congress.
Azerbaijan	Baku	21-22 October	Working visit. Met with President Ilham Aliyev.
Iran	Tehran	22-23 October	Working visit. Met with Supreme Leader Ali Khamenei and President Hassan Rouhani.
Saudi Arabia	Riyadh	October	Working visit. Met with King Salman and Crown Prince Mohammed bin Nayef. Discussed bilateral relations.
Qatar	Doha	23-24 October	Working visit.
Vatican City	Vatican City	24 October	Working visit. Met with Pope Francis.
Cuba	Havana	4 December	Attended the state funeral of Fidel Castro.

== 2017 ==
Country	Areas visited	Date(s)	Notes
Nicaragua	Managua	10 January	Attended the third inauguration ceremony of President Daniel Ortega.
Dominican Republic	Santo Domingo	25 January	Attended the 2017 CELAC summit.
Cuba	Havana	15 August	Working visit. Met with General Secretary Raúl Castro. Visited the tomb of Fidel Castro in Santa Ifigenia Cemetery.
Russia	Moscow	4 October	Working visit. Met with President Vladimir Putin.
Belarus	Minsk	4-5 October	Working visit. Met with President Alexander Lukashenko.
Turkey	Ankara	5-6 October	Official visit. Met with President Recep Tayyip Erdoğan.

== 2018 ==
Country	Areas visited	Date(s)	Notes	Image
Cuba	Havana	21-22 April	Working visit. Met with President Miguel Díaz-Canel.	
China	Beijing	13-16 September	State visit. Met with General Secretary Xi Jinping.	
United States	New York City	26 September	Addressed the general debate of the seventy-third session of the United Nations General Assembly.	
Mexico	Mexico City	1 December	Attended the inauguration reception of President Andrés Manuel López Obrador at the National Palace.	
Russia	Moscow	4-5 December	Working visit. Met with President Vladimir Putin.	

== 2019 ==
Country	Areas visited	Date(s)	Notes	Image
Russia	Moscow	25 September	Working visit. Met with President Vladimir Putin.	
Azerbaijan	Baku	25-26 October	Attended the 18th Summit of the Non-Aligned Movement.	

== 2021 ==
Country	Areas visited	Date(s)	Notes	Image
Mexico	Mexico City	18 September	Attended the CELAC summit.	
Cuba	Havana	25 November	Working visit. Attended the inauguration of the Fidel Castro Ruz Center.	
Cuba	Havana	14 December	Attended the 20th ALBA summit.	

== 2022 ==
Country	Areas visited	Date(s)	Notes	Image
Nicaragua	Managua	10 January	Attended the fourth inauguration ceremony of President Daniel Ortega.	
Cuba	Havana	27 May	Attended the 21st ALBA summit.	
Turkey	Ankara	7-8 June	Working visit.	
Algeria	Algiers	8-9 June	Working visit. Met with President Abdelmadjid Tebboune.	
Iran	Tehran	10-11 June	Working visit. Met with President Ebrahim Raisi.	
Kuwait	Kuwait City	13-14 June	Working visit.	
Qatar	Doha	14-15 June	Working visit.	
Egypt	Sharm El Sheikh	6-18 November	Attended the 2022 United Nations Climate Change Conference.	

== 2023 ==
Country	Areas visited	Date(s)	Notes	Image
Brazil	Brasília	29-30 May	Working visit. Met with President Luiz Inácio Lula da Silva. Attended the 2023 South American summit.	
Turkey	Ankara	3 June	Attended the inauguration ceremony of Recep Tayyip Erdoğan.	
Saudi Arabia	Jeddah	5-6 June	Working visit.	
China	Beijing, Shanghai, Jinan, Shenzhen	8-14 September	State visit.	
Cuba	Havana	15-17 September	Attended the Group of 77 summit.	
Mexico	Palenque	22 October	Attended the Palenque Migration Summit.	
Saint Vincent and the Grenadines	Argyle	14 December	Met with Guyanese President Irfaan Ali. Discussed the Essequibo dispute.	

== 2024 ==
Country	Areas visited	Date(s)	Notes	Image
Saint Vincent and the Grenadines	Kingstown	1-2 March	Attended the CELAC summit.	
Russia	Kazan	22-24 October	Attended the 16th BRICS summit.	

== 2025 ==
Country	Areas visited	Date(s)	Notes	Image
Russia	Moscow	5-9 May	Met with President Vladimir Putin. Signed a strategic partnership treaty. Attended the 2025 Moscow Victory Day Parade.	

== 2026 ==
Country	Areas visited	Date(s)	Notes	Image
United States	New York	3 January-present	Captured and taken out of the country after the 2026 United States strikes in Venezuela. Currently held at the Metropolitan Detention Center, Brooklyn with trial scheduled in June 2027.	

== See also ==
- Foreign relations of Venezuela
- List of international presidential trips made by Hugo Chávez, his predecessor
- President of Venezuela
