= Cancún Declaration =

Cancún Declaration may refer to:

- the FAO Declaration of the International Conference on Responsible Fishing (6–8 May 1992), that established the principles of Monitoring control and surveillance
- the Cancún Declaration of Like-Minded Megadiversity Countries (18 February 2002)
- the ministerial declaration adopted on the World Trade Organization Ministerial Conference of 2003 at Cancun
- the Cancun Declaration of the Latin American and Caribbean Unity Summit (February 2010), for the establishment of the Community of Latin American and Caribbean States (CELAC)

== See also ==
- Cancun conference (disambiguation)
