= Cancun conference =

Cancun conference or Cancun summit may refer to:

- the North–South Summit on Cooperation and Development (October 1981)
- the FAO-led International Conference on Responsible Fishing (6–8 May 1992) that established the principles of Monitoring control and surveillance
- the conference of the Group of Like-Minded Megadiverse Countries (2002)
- the World Trade Organization Ministerial Conference of 2003
- the Latin American and Caribbean Unity Summit (February 2010), 23rd and last summit of the Rio Group, that led to the establishment of the Community of Latin American and Caribbean States (CELAC)
- the 2010 United Nations Climate Change Conference
- the 13th conference (COP13) of the Convention on Biological Diversity (2-3 December 2016)

== See also ==
- Cancun Declaration (disambiguation)
