= Calc =

Calc or CALC may refer to:

- Short for calculation, or calculus
- Windows Calculator, also known by its filename calc.exe
- LibreOffice Calc, an open-source spreadsheet application.
- The Anglo-Saxon rune ᛣ, representing /k/
- The Calcarea class of calcareous sponges
- The Latin American and Caribbean Unity Summit, known in Spanish as the Cumbre de América Latina y el Caribe (CALC)
- The Canadian Association of Lutheran Congregations (CALC)

== See also ==
- Calque
- Calc–silicate rock
