= List of international presidential trips made by Hugo Chávez =

This is a list of international presidential trips made by Hugo Chávez, the 52nd President of Venezuela. During his presidency from 2 February 1999 until his death on 5 March 2013, Chávez made numerous official and state visits across South America, the Caribbean, Europe, Asia, Africa, and the Middle East.

His extensive foreign travel was aimed at strengthening Venezuela's diplomatic and political alliances, promoting regional integration, expanding economic and energy cooperation, and advancing his government's foreign policy objectives.

== Summary ==
The number of visits per country listed in the tables is:

- One visit to Angola, Austria, Bangladesh, Benin, Belgium, Canada, Costa Rica, Denmark, Dominican Republic, Gambia, Germany, Guyana, Honduras, India, Indonesia, Mali, Nicaragua, Paraguay, the Philippines, Saudi Arabia, Singapore, South Korea, Switzerland, and Turkmenistan
- Two visits to Belarus, Bolivia, Guatemala, Italy, Japan, Malaysia, Portugal, Syria, and the United Kingdom
- Three visits to Algeria, Chile, Mexico, Qatar, Uruguay
- Four visits to Argentina, Spain
- Five visits to Colombia, Ecuador, and the United States
- Six visits to Iran, Libya, and Russia
- Seven visits to Brazil, China, Cuba, and France

Hong Kong is listed separately as a territory visited during the 1999 Asian tour. The summary reflects the trips currently documented in the draft and should be updated as additional trips are added.

== 1999 ==
Country	Areas visited	Date(s)	Notes
United States	New York City	6–9 September	Private visit to meet with U.S. President Bill Clinton.
United States	New York City	21 September	Attended the annual United Nations General Assembly.
Germany	Berlin	29 September	Attended a meeting with President Johannes Rau and Chancellor Gerhard Schröder. Visited installations of the Veba Oel company, a subsidiary of the Venezuelan state oil company.
Italy	Rome	30 September	Met with President Carlo Azeglio Ciampi. Held a private audience with Pope John Paul II at the Vatican to discuss his political reforms.
China	Beijing	10–13 October	State visit to China, focused on strengthening bilateral relations and economic cooperation.
Japan	Tokyo	13–14 October	Presidential tour of Asia.
South Korea	Seoul	15 October	Presidential tour of Asia. First visit by a Venezuelan president to the country.
Hong Kong	Hong Kong	17 October	Presidential tour of Asia.
Malaysia	Kuala Lumpur	18 October	Presidential tour of Asia.
Singapore	Singapore	21 October	Presidential tour of Asia.
Philippines	Manila	22 October	Presidential tour of Asia.
Spain	Madrid	24–25 October	Two-day official visit following a tour of Asian countries. Met with King Juan Carlos I and Prime Minister José María Aznar. During this trip, he defended his political reforms at a press conference.
France	Paris	26 October	Stopover in Paris on his return journey from Spain to Venezuela after an Asian tour.

== 2000 ==
Country	Areas visited	Date(s)	Notes
Colombia	Bogotá	4 May	Signing of the Santa Marta commitment with President Andrés Pastrana.
Qatar	Doha	8 August	2nd summit of heads of state of the Organization of the Petroleum Exporting Countries (OPEC).
Indonesia	Jakarta	12 August	Working visit.
Libya	Tripoli	14 August	Meeting with leader Muammar Gaddafi.
Guatemala	Guatemala City	19–20 November	Official visit aimed at strengthening economic, commercial, financial, and bilateral cooperation. Met with President Alfonso Portillo and signed a political concertation agreement between Guatemala and Venezuela.

== 2001 ==
Country	Areas visited	Date(s)	Notes
Colombia	Cartagena	18 April	Attended the XIII Summit of the Andean Community of Nations (CAN) and held bilateral talks with President Andrés Pastrana.
Canada	Quebec City	20–22 April	Attended the 3rd Summit of the Americas. Voiced his opposition to the proposed Free Trade Area of the Americas (FTAA) and registered a formal reservation against the final summit declaration.
Colombia	Bogotá	4–5 May	Official state visit focused on bilateral trade and energy integration. Met with President Andrés Pastrana, addressed the Congress of Colombia, and signed joint economic commitments.
Iran	Tehran	18–21 May	State visit focused on strengthening bilateral relations and energy cooperation.
Bangladesh	Dhaka	23–24 May	First official visit by a Venezuelan president to Bangladesh.
China	Beijing, Chengdu	24–28 May	State visit to China at the invitation of President Jiang Zemin, including meetings in Beijing and a visit to Chengdu.
Chile	Isla Negra, Santiago	19 August	Official visit to Chile following his participation in the Rio Group Summit.
Switzerland	Geneva	7–8 October	Part of Chávez's official international tour of OPEC member states and Europe.
France	Paris	8–10 October	Part of Chávez's official international tour of OPEC member states and Europe.
Italy	Rome	11–12 October	Part of Chávez's official international tour of OPEC member states and Europe.
Algeria	Algiers	12–14 October	Part of Chávez's official tour of OPEC member states and Europe.
Libya	Tripoli	14–16 October	Part of Chávez's official tour of OPEC member states and Europe.
Belgium	Brussels	16 October	Part of Chávez's official tour of OPEC member states and Europe.
Austria	Vienna	17 October	Part of Chávez's official tour of OPEC member states and Europe.
Portugal	Lisbon	17–19 October	Part of Chávez's official tour of OPEC member states and Europe.
Saudi Arabia	Riyadh	20 October	Part of Chávez's official tour of OPEC member states and Europe.
Iran	Tehran	21 October	Brief visit following his tour of OPEC member states. Met with President Mohammad Khatami to coordinate OPEC strategy and discuss oil prices.
Russia	Moscow	21–22 October	Part of Chávez's official international tour.
United Kingdom	London	23–24 October	Met with Queen Elizabeth II and Prime Minister Tony Blair at Buckingham Palace.

== 2002 ==
Country	Areas visited	Date(s)	Notes
Mexico	Monterrey	18 March	Monterrey Consensus, International Conference on Financing for Development.
France	Paris	15 October	Official tour in Europe, met with President Jacques Chirac.
Dominican Republic	Bávaro, Punta Cana	15–16 November	Attended the XII Ibero-American Summit.

== 2003 ==
Country	Areas visited	Date(s)	Notes
Brazil	Brasília	1 January	Attended the presidential inauguration of Luiz Inácio Lula da Silva.
Ecuador	Quito	15 January	Attended the inauguration of President Lucio Gutiérrez.
Brazil	Recife	26 April	Official visit during a tour of Venezuela's South American neighbors.
Paraguay	Asunción	15 August	Attended the inauguration of President Nicanor Duarte.
Uruguay	Montevideo	16 August	Visited Uruguay at the invitation of the Latin American Integration Association and participated in a special session of its representatives.
Argentina	Buenos Aires	16–20 August	Official visit meeting with President Néstor Kirchner to sign bilateral trade agreements and propose regional energy initiatives.

== 2004 ==
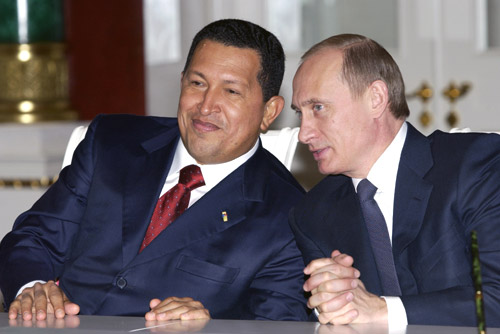
Vladimir Putin and Hugo Chávez in Moscow, November 2004

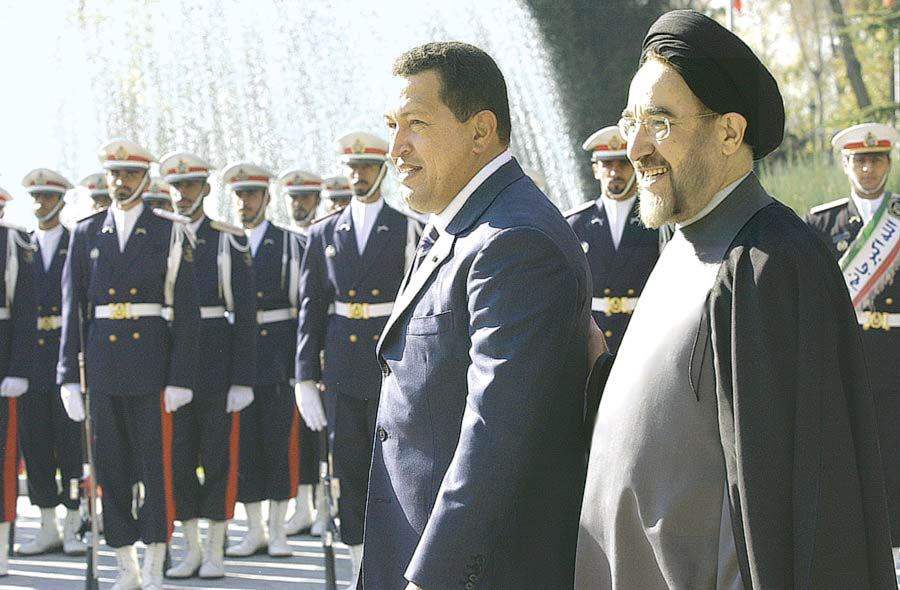
Iranian president Mohammad Khatami with Chávez during his official visit to Tehran in 2004.

Country	Areas visited	Date(s)	Notes
Guyana	Georgetown	19-20 February	Official visit.
Mexico	Guadalajara	28–29 May	3rd Latin America, the Caribbean and the European Union Summit.
Cuba	Havana	6 November	Meeting with President Fidel Castro.
Costa Rica	San José	19–21 November	Attended the XIV Ibero-American Summit.
Spain	Madrid	22 November	Meeting with Prime Minister José Luis Rodríguez Zapatero.
Libya	Tripoli	24 November	Received the Muammar Gaddafi International Prize for Human Rights.
Russia	Moscow	25–27 November	Met with President Vladimir Putin and discussed energy and commercial cooperation.
Iran	Tehran	28 November	Met with Iranian officials and pursued bilateral commercial agreements.
Qatar	Doha	29-30 November	Brief visit during Chávez's international tour.
China	Beijing	23–26 December	State visit focused on strengthening energy, trade, and strategic cooperation.

== 2005 ==
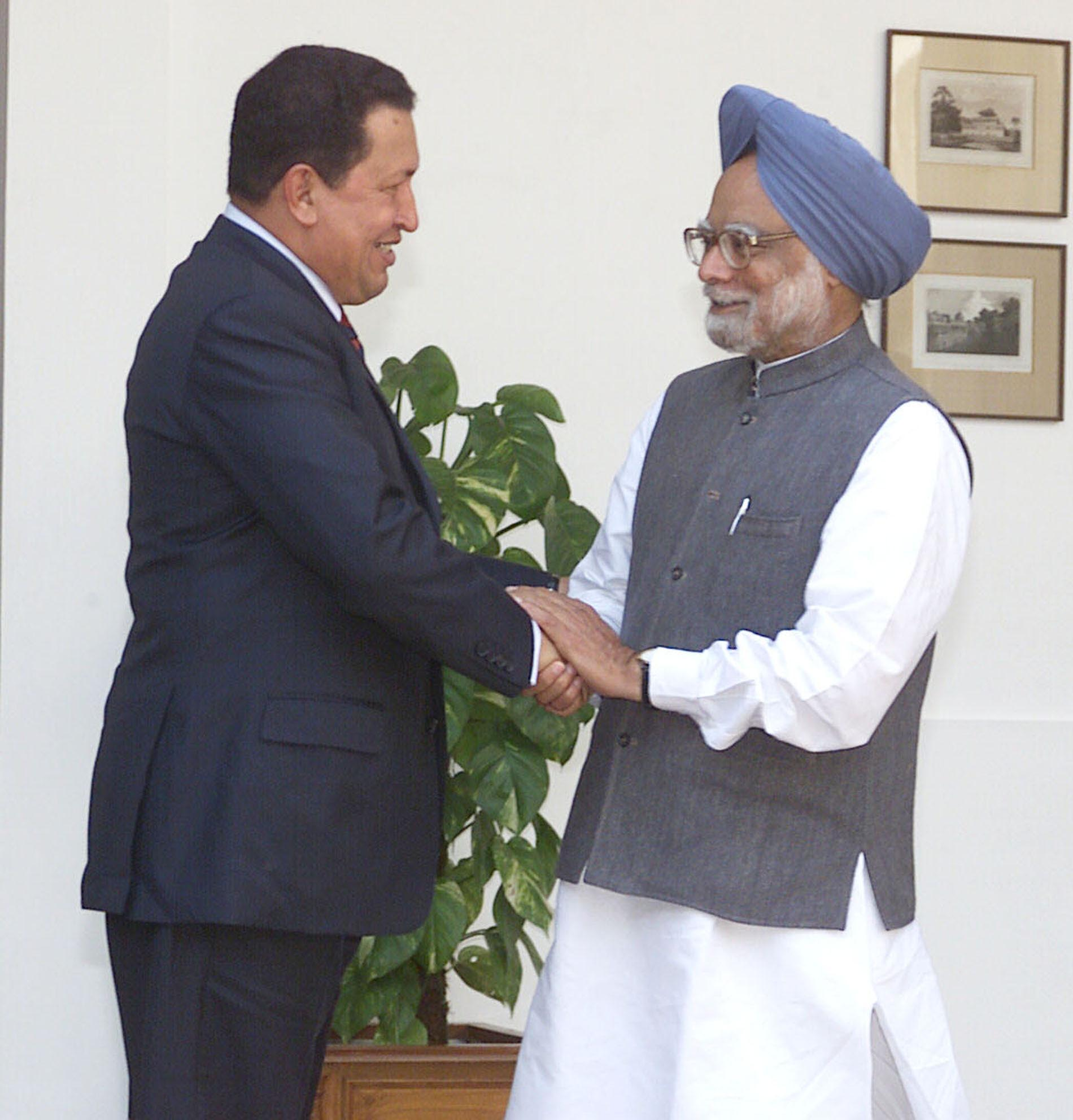
Meeting between Hugo Chávez and Indian prime minister Manmohan Singh in New Delhi, 2005.

Country	Areas visited	Date(s)	Notes
Brazil	Porto Alegre, Tapes	30 January	Attended the World Social Forum in Porto Alegre and visited a landless workers' movement settlement in Tapes.
India	New Delhi, Kolkata, Bangalore	4–7 March	First official State Visit by a Venezuelan president to India. Met with President A. P. J. Abdul Kalam and Prime Minister Manmohan Singh, signing bilateral agreements spanning energy, biotechnology, railways, and trade.
France	Paris	9 March	Stopover working visit to meet with French government officials following his trip to India.
Cuba	Havana	28–29 April	Attended the First Strategic Meeting for the Implementation of the ALBA agreement alongside Fidel Castro.
Cuba	Havana, Sandino	20–23 August	Hosted his broadcast program Aló Presidente from Havana and inaugurated a housing project built with Venezuelan aid in Sandino alongside Fidel Castro.
Jamaica	Montego Bay	23 August	Attended the Petrocaribe summit to sign an energy agreement allowing Caribbean nations to purchase Venezuelan oil under preferential financing terms.
United States	New York City	15–18 September	Addressed the United Nations World Summit and UN General Assembly, delivering speeches critical of US foreign policy, and visited local community organizations in the South Bronx.
France	Paris	19–20 October	Working visit meeting with President Jacques Chirac at the Élysée Palace to discuss bilateral trade and energy cooperation.
Argentina	Mar del Plata	3–5 November	Attended the 4th Summit of the Americas and spoke at the counter-summit "People's Summit," leading opposition against the proposed Free Trade Area of the Americas (FTAA).

== 2006 ==
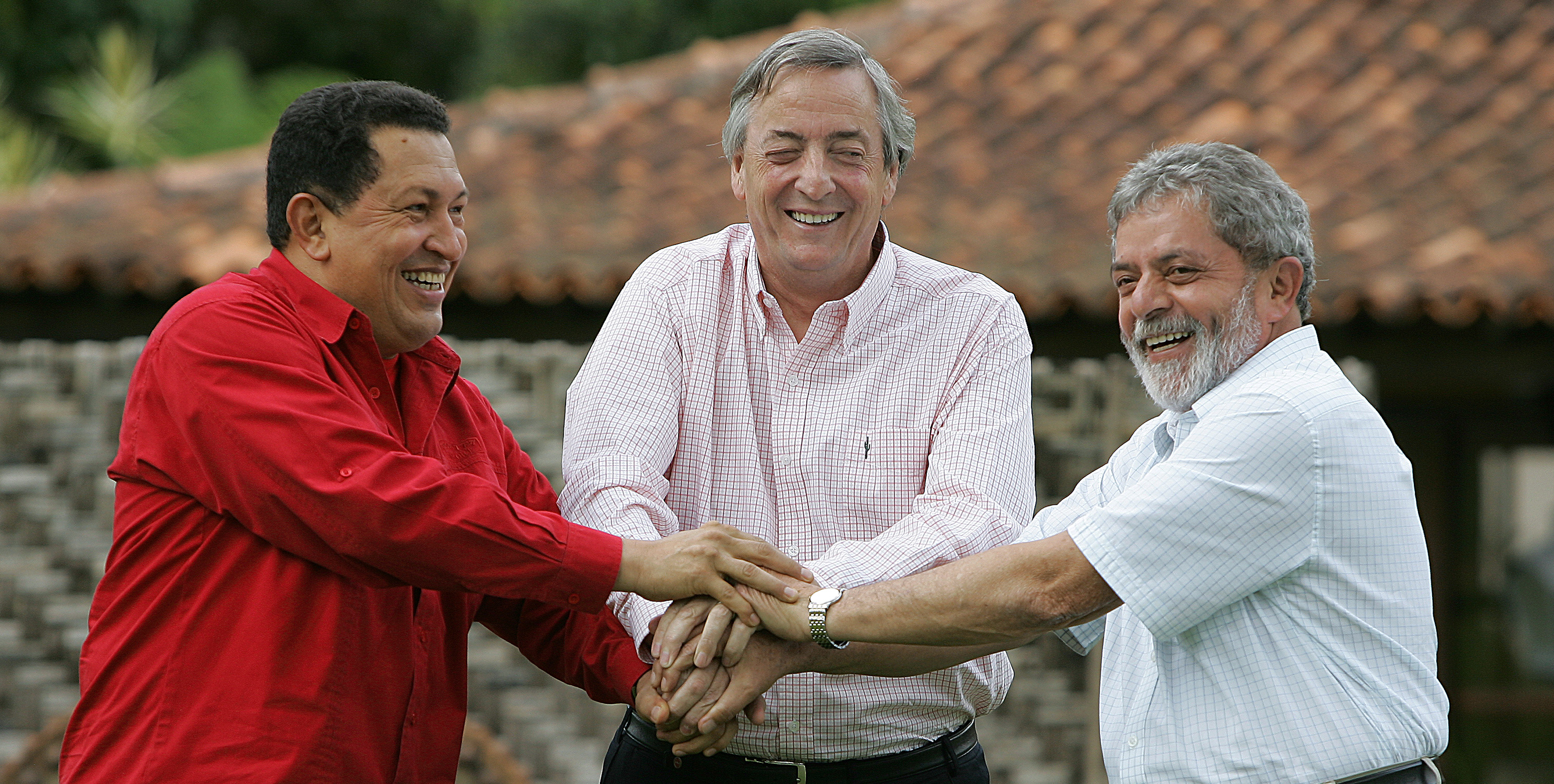
Hugo Chávez, Lula da Silva and Néstor Kirchner meeting at Granja do Torto, the official residence of the president of Brazil, in 2006.

Country	Areas visited	Date(s)	Notes
Guatemala	Guatemala City	13 January	Working visit.
Chile	Valparaíso	11 March	Presidential inauguration of Michelle Bachelet.
United Kingdom	London	14 May	Three-day private visit, including meeting with mayor Ken Livingstone.
Algeria	Algiers	16 May	Working visit with President Abdelaziz Bouteflika concerning bilateral relations and energy cooperation.
Libya	Tripoli	18–19 May	Meeting with Muammar Gaddafi.
Ecuador	Quito	30 May	Lunch with President Alfredo Palacio.
Gambia	Banjul	1–2 July	Attended the African Union summit as a guest of President Yahya Jammeh.
Belarus	Minsk	23–25 July	Meeting with President Alexander Lukashenko.
Iran	Tehran	28–30 July	Meeting with President Mahmoud Ahmadinejad and Supreme Leader Ali Khamenei.
Vietnam	Hanoi	31 July – 1 August	Signing of an energy cooperation agreement.
Mali	Bamako	2–3 August	Met with President Amadou Toumani Touré and discussed bilateral cooperation.
Benin	Cotonou	3 August	Met with President Yayi Boni and signed an agreement concerning housing and microfinance cooperation.
China	Beijing	22–27 August	State visit focused on energy, investment, and bilateral cooperation.
Malaysia	Kuala Lumpur, Putrajaya	27–30 August	Meeting with the Yang di-Pertuan Agong and Prime Minister.
Syria	Damascus	30 August	Meeting with President Bashar al-Assad.
Angola	Luanda	31 August	Met with President José Eduardo dos Santos to discuss oil cooperation, United Nations reform, and bilateral relations.
United States	New York City	20 September	Guest at the general debate of the United Nations General Assembly. He made his notable speech denouncing U.S. President George W. Bush's foreign policy and calling him the "devil."

== 2007 ==
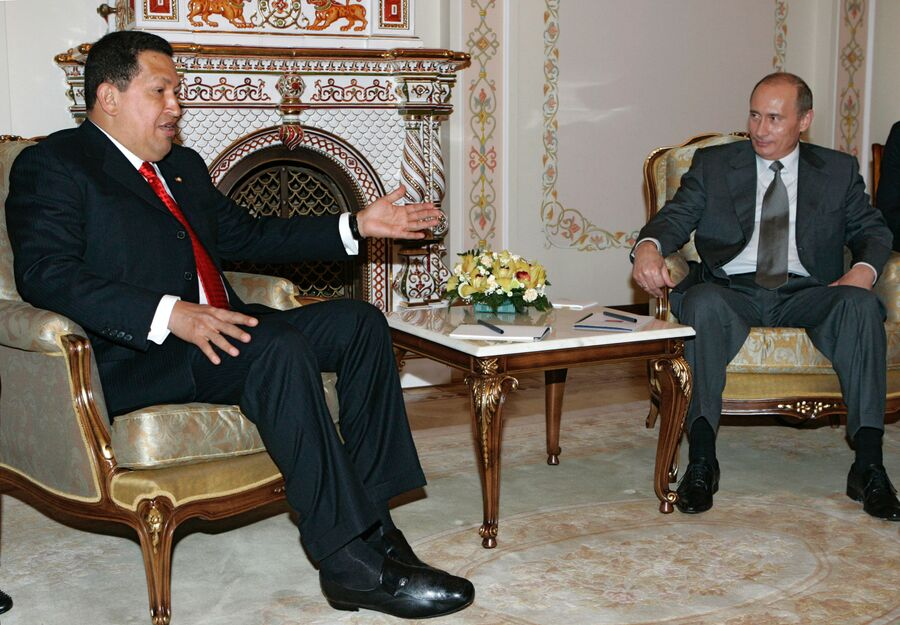
Meeting between Chávez and Vladimir Putin in 2007.

Country	Areas visited	Date(s)	Notes
Ecuador	Quito	15 January	Guest at the presidential inauguration of Rafael Correa.
Bolivia	La Paz	11 March	Meeting with President Evo Morales.
Nicaragua	Managua	13 March	Meeting with President Daniel Ortega.
Russia	Moscow, Rostov-on-Don	27–30 June	Official visit meeting with President Vladimir Putin to discuss energy partnerships, military-technical cooperation, and sign economic agreements.
Argentina	Buenos Aires	6–8 August	Signing of an agreement for the sale of liquefied gas, purchase of Argentine bonds.
Colombia	Bogotá	31 August	Met with President Álvaro Uribe at the Nariño Palace to discuss economic integration and accepted a role as mediator in negotiations with the FARC guerrilla group for a humanitarian hostage exchange.
Chile	Santiago de Chile	8–10 November	Guest at the XVII Ibero-American Summit.
Iran	Tehran	19 November	Brief visit following the OPEC summit in Riyadh, meeting with President Mahmoud Ahmadinejad and discussing industrial cooperation.
France	Paris	20 November	Met with President Nicolas Sarkozy to discuss mediation efforts with the FARC for a hostage swap involving French-Colombian politician Íngrid Betancourt, as well as agreements on joint energy projects with French oil company Total.
Uruguay	Montevideo	17–18 December	Meeting with President Tabaré Vázquez.

== 2008 ==
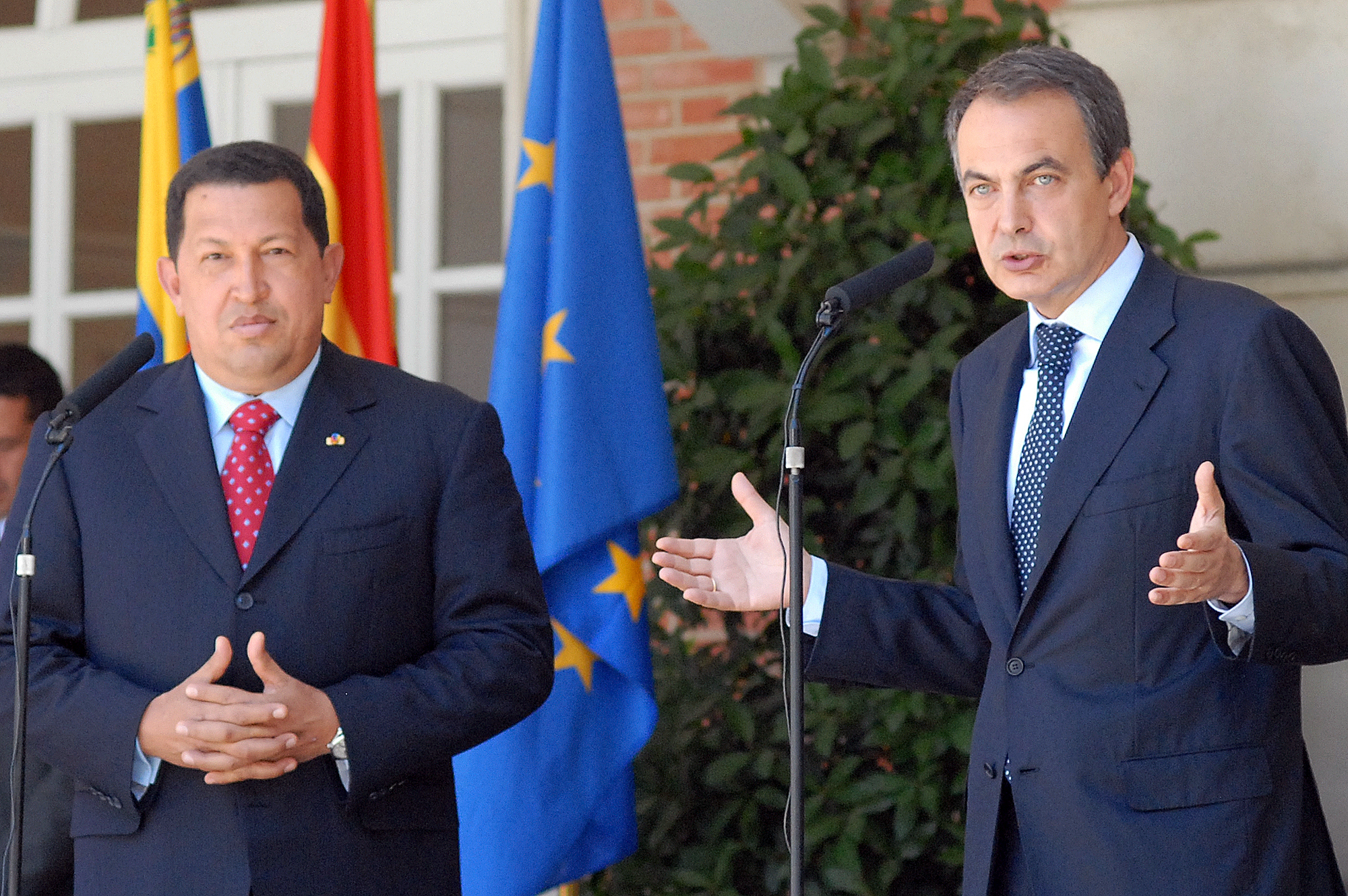
José Luis Rodríguez Zapatero at a press conference with Venezuelan president Hugo Chávez.

Country	Areas visited	Date(s)	Notes
Honduras	Tegucigalpa	14 January	Meeting with President Manuel Zelaya.
Portugal	Lisbon	23–24 July	Met with President Aníbal Cavaco Silva and Prime Minister José Sócrates and signed bilateral cooperation agreements.
Spain	Palma de Mallorca, Madrid	25 July	Met with King Juan Carlos I at Marivent Palace in Palma de Mallorca and held talks with Prime Minister José Luis Rodríguez Zapatero in Madrid, marking a reconciliation following the 2007 "¿Por qué no te callas?" incident.
China	Beijing	23–25 September	Working visit focused on energy cooperation and strengthening the bilateral strategic partnership.
Russia	Moscow	26 September	International tour, nuclear energy cooperation.
France	Paris	27 September	International tour, state visit to President Nicolas Sarkozy.

== 2009 ==
Map of countries visited by Chávez on his September 2009 presidential tour.

Country	Areas visited	Date(s)	Notes
Japan	Tokyo	5–7 April	Working visit aimed at establishing a strategic trade and energy alliance. Met with Prime Minister Taro Aso and business leaders to sign agreements on natural gas projects and joint oil exploration in the Orinoco Oil Belt.
China	Beijing	7–9 April	Working visit focused on energy, trade, and strengthening the bilateral strategic partnership.
Libya	Tripoli	31 August – 2 September	Attended the 40th anniversary celebrations of the Libyan Revolution alongside Muammar Gaddafi and addressed a special summit of the African Union.
Algeria	Algiers	2–3 September	Bilateral meeting and working dinner with President Abdelaziz Bouteflika to expand trade, agricultural, and energy cooperation.
Syria	Damascus, Sweida	3–5 September	Met with President Bashar al-Assad to sign strategic accords and addressed a public crowd in Sweida, where he inaugurated a cultural center named after Simón Bolívar.
Iran	Tehran	5–6 September	Met with Supreme Leader Ali Khamenei and President Mahmoud Ahmadinejad to sign trade agreements, establish a joint bank, and coordinate OPEC strategy.
Turkmenistan	Ashgabat	6–7 September	Presidential tour stop, meeting with President Gurbanguly Berdimuhamedow to discuss bilateral ties.
Belarus	Minsk	8–9 September	Met with President Alexander Lukashenko to expand economic, agricultural, and technological partnerships, and inspect joint industrial projects.
Russia	Moscow, Barvikha	9–11 September	Met with President Dmitry Medvedev and Prime Minister Vladimir Putin, securing defense and energy agreements, and formally announced Venezuela's recognition of Abkhazia and South Ossetia.
Spain	Madrid	11 September	Working visit meeting with Prime Minister José Luis Rodríguez Zapatero and King Juan Carlos I to strengthen diplomatic and commercial relations.
United States	New York City	23–24 September	Addressed the 64th Session of the United Nations General Assembly, spoke at local community events, and briefly slipped away from his U.S. Secret Service detail to interact with crowds in the city.
Argentina	Buenos Aires	10 December	Meeting with President Cristina Fernández de Kirchner.
Denmark	Copenhagen	7–18 December	Guest at the United Nations Climate Change Conference.

== 2010 ==
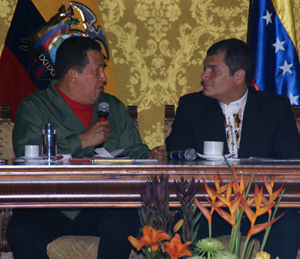
Hugo Chávez and Ecuadorian president Rafael Correa at the Carondelet Palace, 2010.

Country	Areas visited	Date(s)	Notes
Mexico	Cancún	22–23 February	Attended the Latin American and Caribbean Unity Summit. The summit, hosted by President Felipe Calderón, was marked by a notable confrontation with Colombian President Álvaro Uribe.
Ecuador	Quito	26 March	Working visit.
Russia	Moscow	14–15 October	Working visit. Met with Prime Minister Vladimir Putin and signed several bilateral agreements, including a memorandum on nuclear energy cooperation. Also oversaw the signing of contracts for the supply of Russian helicopters to Venezuela.
Iran	Tehran	18 October	Review of bilateral relations, including energy cooperation.
Libya	Tripoli	22 October	Meeting with leader Muammar Gaddafi.

== 2011 ==
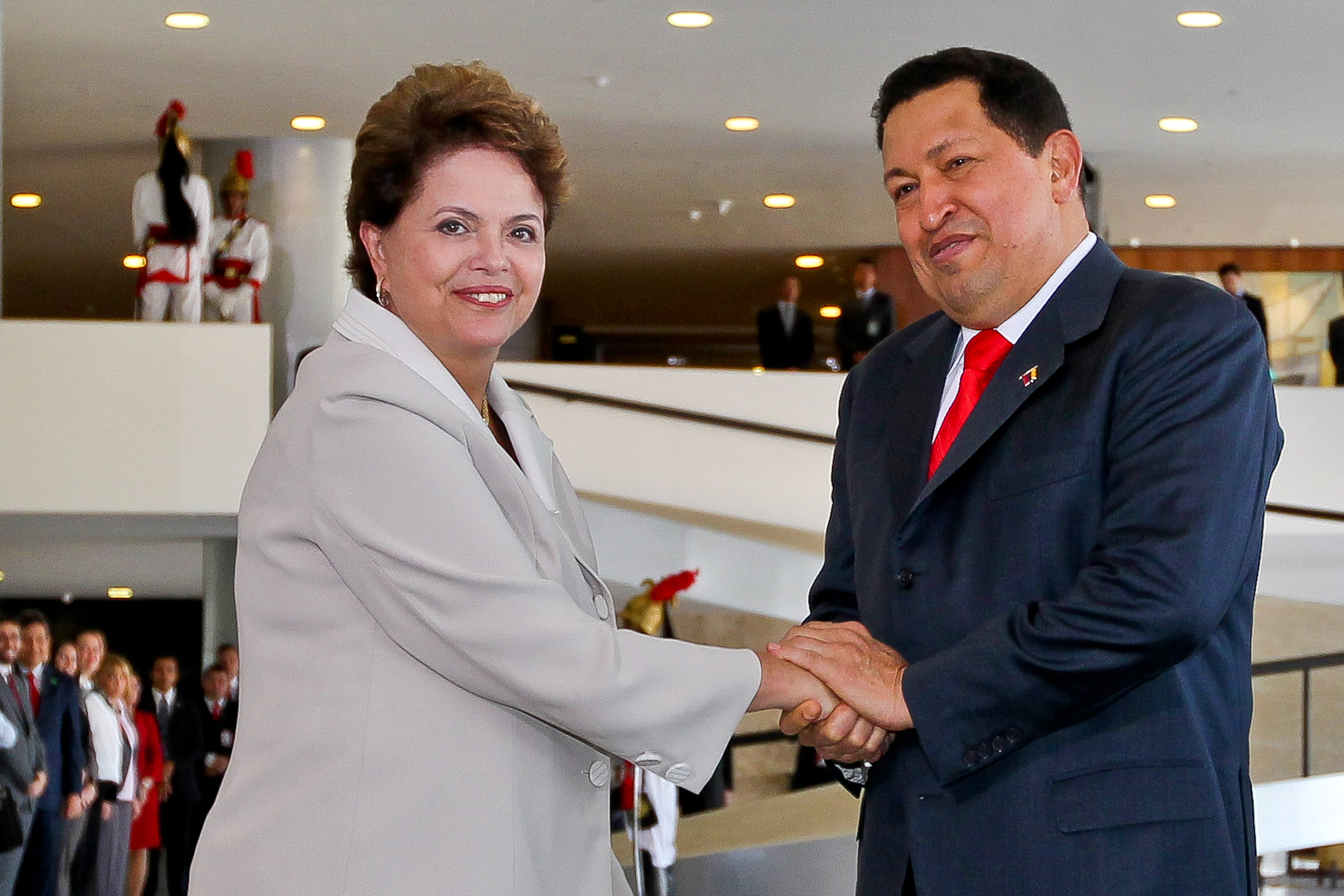
Brazilian president Dilma Rousseff and Hugo Chávez in Brasília, 2011.

Country	Areas visited	Date(s)	Notes
Brazil	Brasília	1 January	Attended the presidential inauguration of Dilma Rousseff.
Uruguay	Montevideo	29 March	Meeting with President José Mujica.
Bolivia	Cochabamba	31 March	Meeting with President Evo Morales.
Colombia	Cartagena	9 April	Met with President Juan Manuel Santos at the Casa de Huéspedes Ilustres to boost bilateral trade, repair diplomatic relations, and sign economic accords. The meeting had been delayed by a week due to a mechanical breakdown of the Venezuelan presidential aircraft.
Brazil	Brasília	5–7 June	Official visit meeting with President Dilma Rousseff as part of a regional tour.
Ecuador	Quito	7 June	Meeting with President Rafael Correa.
Cuba	Havana	16 July	Medical treatment for cancer.

== 2012 ==
Country	Areas visited	Date(s)	Notes
Cuba	Havana	24 February – 16 March	Surgery for a cancerous tumour.
Brazil	Brasília	30 July – 1 August	Attended a summit marking Venezuela's official entry as a full member of Mercosur.
Cuba	Havana	10 December 2012 – 18 February 2013	Underwent his fourth cancer surgery on 11 December 2012, followed by an extensive post-operative treatment. This was his final international trip, returning to Venezuela in February 2013 shortly before his death.

== See also ==
- Foreign relations of Venezuela
- List of international presidential trips made by Nicolás Maduro, his successor
- President of Venezuela
