= Latin American and Caribbean Space Agency =

International space exploration organization based in Mexico

- Agencia Latinoamericana y Caribeña del Espacio

Agency overview
- Abbreviation: ALCE
- Formed: 2021
- Type: Space agency
- Jurisdiction: Latin America and the Caribbean
- Status: Active
- Headquarters: Mexico
- Official languages: Spanish, English, Portuguese and French
- Annual budget: $100 million

Latin American and Caribbean Space Agency (ALCE; Spanish: Agencia Latinoamericana y Caribeña del Espacio) is an international space exploration organization based in Mexico, comprising several countries in Latin America and the Caribbean region. It was established in 2021 as part of the space race. According to its charter, its objective is to coordinate the space cooperation activities of Latin American and Caribbean countries for the peaceful use and exploration of outer space, the Moon and other celestial bodies.

== Origin ==
The agency first originated on October 9, 2020, when Mexico's foreign secretary, Marcelo Ebrard, and Argentina's foreign minister, Felipe Solá, signed an agreement committing to create a Latin American space agency. On July 24, 2021, within the framework of the XXI Meeting of Foreign Ministers of the Community of Latin American and Caribbean States (CELAC) held at the Chapultepec Castle in Mexico, this country, which assumed the pro tempore presidency of said organization and was the main promoter of the project, signed together with the member states of Argentina, Bolivia, Costa Rica, Ecuador and Paraguay an agreement for the creation of the ALCE. Subsequently, on September 18 of that same year, nineteen states signed the Constitutive Agreement of the ALCE within the framework of the VI CELAC Summit of 2021 held at the National Palace of Mexico. Finally, on March 16, 2022, the Mexican Senate ratified the creation of the ALCE headquarters in Mexico, thus formally establishing the agency.

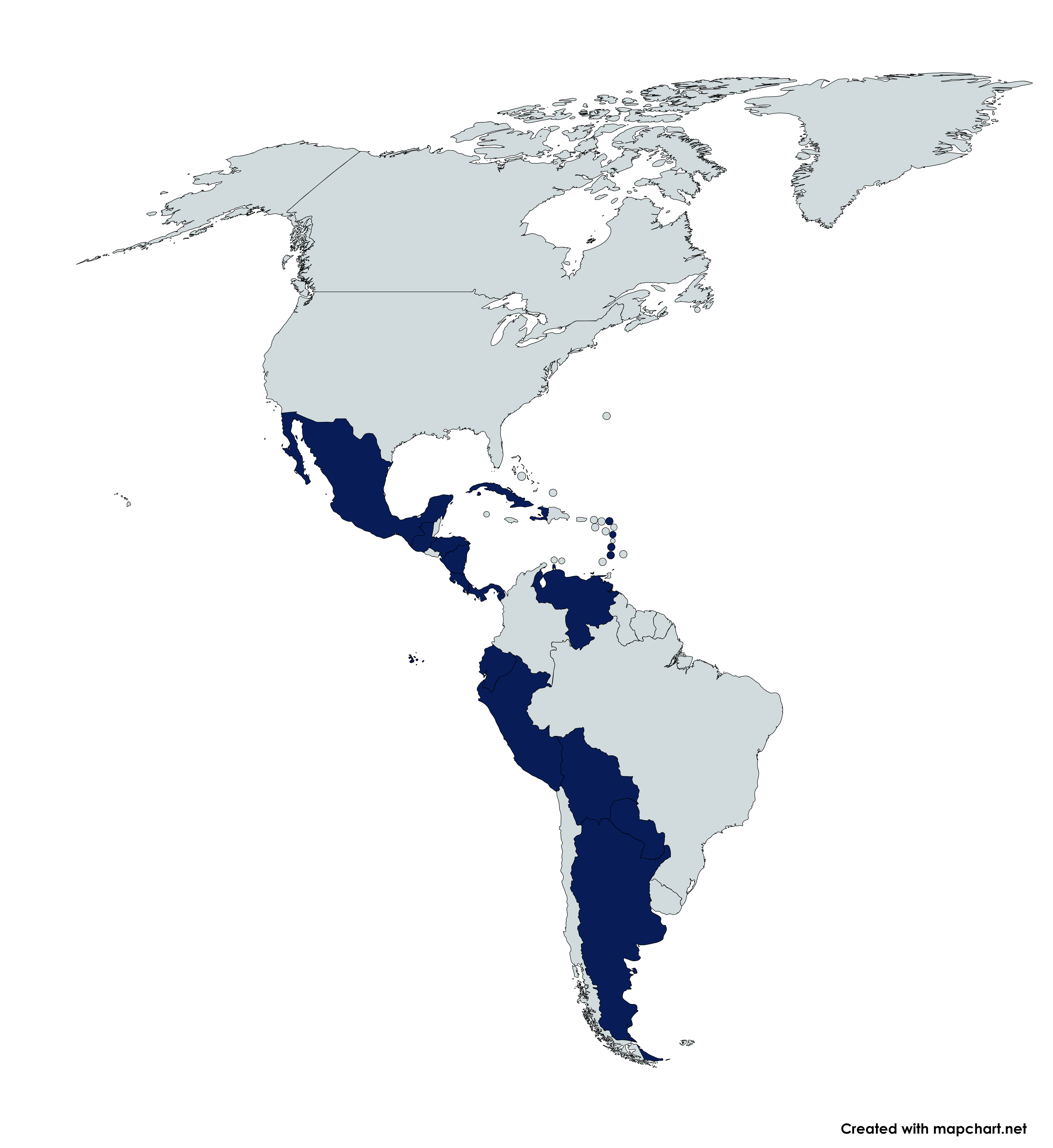
Initial Members of the Latin American and Caribbean Space Agency (ALCE)

Mexico foreign Secretary Marcelo Ebrard, together with the Foreign Ministers of Antigua and Barbuda, Argentina, Bolivia, Costa Rica, Cuba, Dominica, Ecuador, Guatemala, Haiti, Honduras, Nicaragua, Panama, Paraguay, Peru, Saint Lucia, Saint Vincent and the Grenadines, and Venezuela signed the Convention at its outset. The Convention is designed to remain open for participation by other Latin American and Caribbean countries.

== Member states ==
The nations that make up the ALCE are the following:

- Antigua and Barbuda
- Argentina
- Belize
- Bolivia
- Costa Rica
- Cuba
- Dominica
- Dominican Republic
- Ecuador
- El Salvador
- Guatemala
- Haiti
- Honduras
- Jamaica
- Mexico
- Nicaragua
- Panama
- Paraguay
- Peru
- Saint Kitts and Nevis
- Saint Lucia
- Saint Vincent and the Grenadines
- Venezuela

== See also ==
- Hispasat
- List of government space agencies
- International Astronautical Federation (IAF)
