= 2013 CELAC summit =

I CELAC Summit
- Host country: Chile
- Date: January 27–28, 2013
- Cities: Santiago
- Participants: CELAC states except Paraguay: Antigua and Barbuda; Argentina; Bahamas; Barbados; Belize; Bolivia; Brazil; Chile; Colombia; Costa Rica; Cuba; Dominica; Dominican Republic; Ecuador; El Salvador; Grenada; Guatemala; Guyana; Haiti; Honduras; Jamaica; Mexico; Nicaragua; Panama; Peru; Saint Kitts and Nevis; Saint Lucia; Saint Vincent and the Grenadines; Suriname; Trinidad and Tobago; Uruguay; Venezuela
- Follows: 2011 CELAC summit
- Precedes: 2014 CELAC summit

The I CELAC summit or 2013 CELAC summit was the first ordinary heads of state summit of the Community of Latin American and Caribbean States. It was held on 27 and 28 January 2013 in Santiago, Chile.

All CELAC member states participated except Paraguay. Following the impeachment of Fernando Lugo in 2012, Paraguay was excluded from Mercosur and Unasur meetings. While Paraguay was not officially sanctioned or suspended by CELAC, the government decided not to attend the summit, claiming that it had not been invited to it.

On 28 January 2013, the President of Cuba Raúl Castro succeeded President of Chile Sebastián Piñera as the pro tempore president of the CELAC. This was criticized by Cuban exile organizations Cuban American National Foundation, Cuban Democratic Directorate, Assembly of the Resistance, Cuban Liberty Council, as well as the Politically Persecuted Venezuelans Abroad (Veppex).

== I EU-CELAC summit ==
On 26 January 2013, before the I CELAC summit, the I EU-CELAC summit was held. It was the 7th bi-regional summit and the first to have the CELAC as the European Union counterpart in Latin America and the Caribbean.
