= 2014 CELAC summit =

II CELAC Summit
- Host country: Cuba
- Date: January 28–29, 2014
- Cities: Havana
- Participants: CELAC: Antigua and Barbuda; Argentina; Bahamas; Barbados; Belize; Bolivia; Brazil; Chile; Colombia; Costa Rica; Cuba; Dominica; Dominican Republic; Ecuador; El Salvador; Grenada; Guatemala; Guyana; Haiti; Honduras; Jamaica; Mexico; Nicaragua; Panama; Paraguay; Peru; Saint Kitts and Nevis; Saint Lucia; Saint Vincent and the Grenadines; Suriname; Trinidad and Tobago; Uruguay; Venezuela
- Follows: 2013 CELAC summit
- Precedes: 2015 CELAC summit

The II CELAC summit or 2014 CELAC summit was the second ordinary heads of state summit of the Community of Latin American and Caribbean States. It was held on 28 and 29 January 2014 in Havana, Cuba.

The plenary session was opened by Secretary-General of the United Nations Ban Ki-moon.
