= 2016 CELAC summit =

IV CELAC Summit
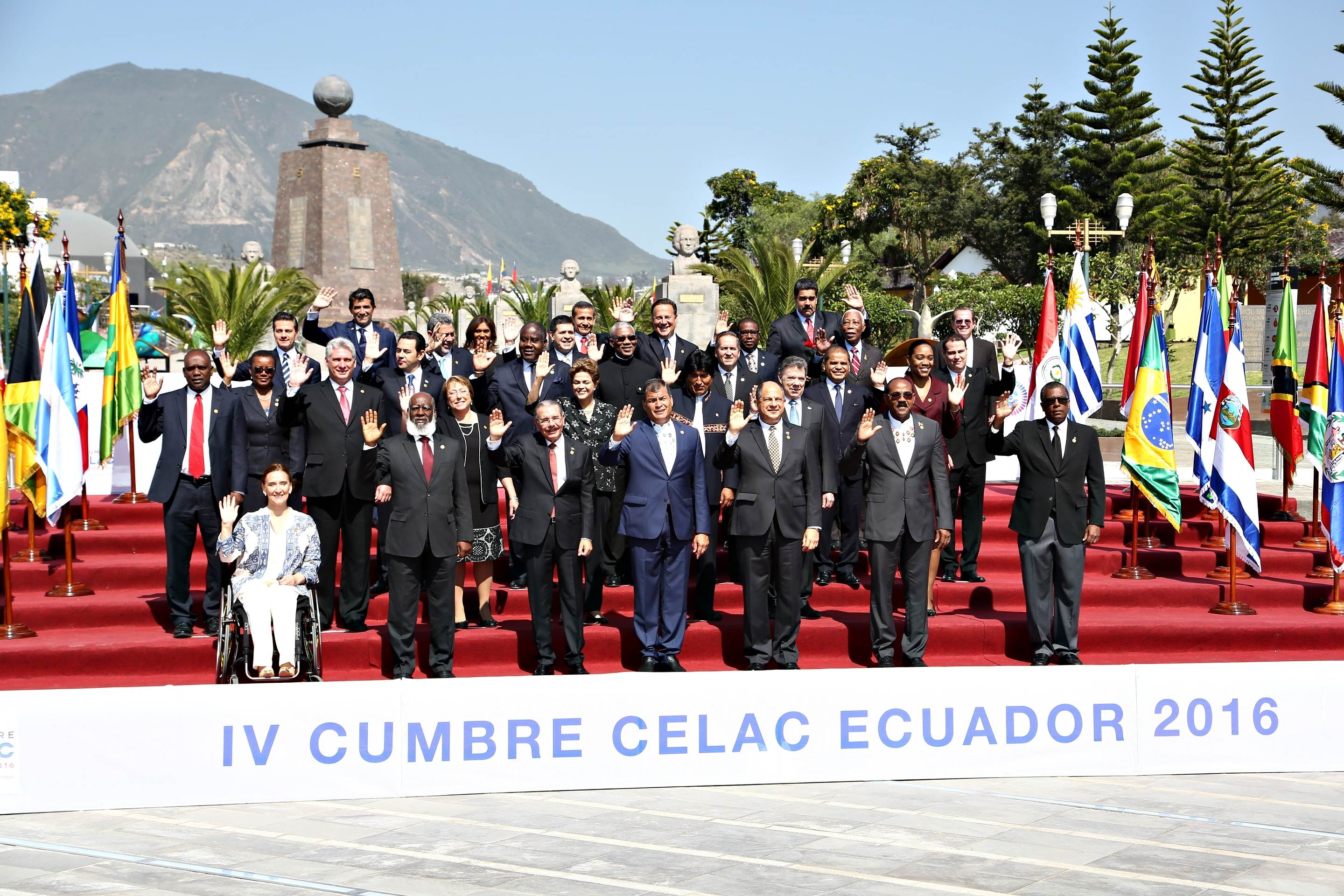
- Host country: Ecuador
- Date: January 26–27, 2016
- Cities: Quito
- Participants: CELAC: Antigua and Barbuda; Argentina; Bahamas; Barbados; Belize; Bolivia; Brazil; Chile; Colombia; Costa Rica; Cuba; Dominica; Dominican Republic; Ecuador; El Salvador; Grenada; Guatemala; Guyana; Haiti; Honduras; Jamaica; Mexico; Nicaragua; Panama; Paraguay; Peru; Saint Kitts and Nevis; Saint Lucia; Saint Vincent and the Grenadines; Suriname; Trinidad and Tobago; Uruguay; Venezuela
- Follows: 2015 CELAC summit
- Precedes: 2017 CELAC summit
- Website: www.cuartacumbrecelac.com

The IV CELAC summit or 2016 CELAC summit was the fourth ordinary heads of state summit of the Community of Latin American and Caribbean States. It was held on 26 and 27 January 2016 in Quito, Ecuador.
