= 2011 CELAC summit =

Cumbre de la Celac de 2011
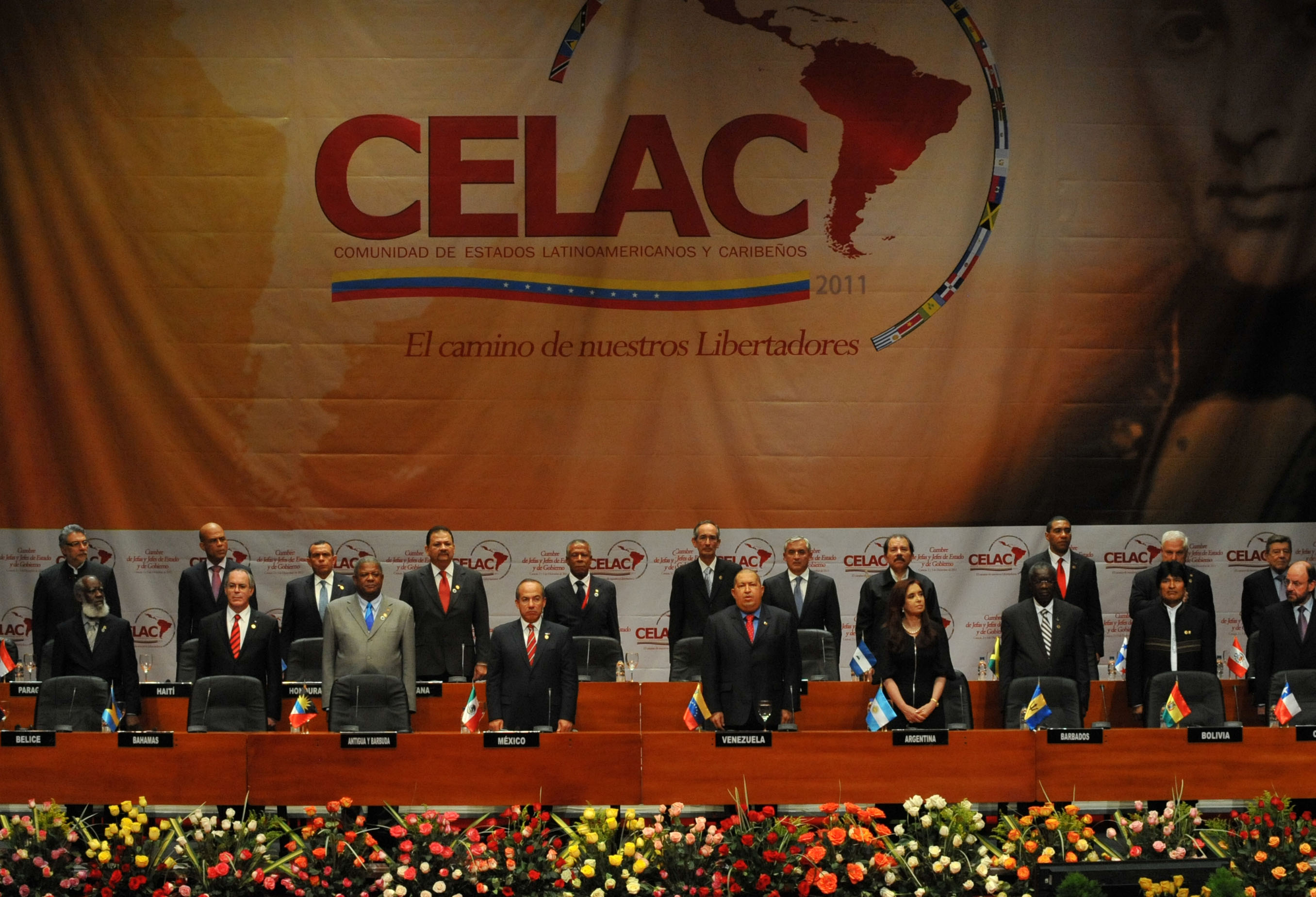
- Host country: Venezuela
- Date: December 2–3, 2011
- Cities: Caracas
- Participants: CELAC states: Antigua and Barbuda; Argentina; Bahamas; Barbados; Belize; Bolivia; Brazil; Chile; Colombia; Costa Rica; Cuba; Dominica; Dominican Republic; Ecuador; El Salvador; Grenada; Guatemala; Guyana; Haiti; Honduras; Jamaica; Mexico; Nicaragua; Panama; Paraguay; Peru; Saint Kitts and Nevis; Saint Lucia; Saint Vincent and the Grenadines; Suriname; Trinidad and Tobago; Uruguay; Venezuela
- Follows: Latin American and Caribbean Unity Summit
- Precedes: 2013 CELAC summit
- Website: www.celac.gob.ve Archived 20 June 2013 at the Wayback Machine

Key points

The 2011 CELAC summit (Spanish: Cumbre de la Celac de 2011) was the founding conference of the Community of Latin American and Caribbean States. It was held on 2 and 3 December 2011 in Caracas, Venezuela with the participation of 33 countries.

The summit was due to be held in mid-2011, but was postponed because of the ill-health of Hugo Chávez, president of the host nation, Venezuela. The summit was instead held on 2 and 3 December 2011 in Caracas. It primarily focused on the global economic crisis and its effects on the region. Several leaders, including presidents Cristina Fernández de Kirchner, Dilma Rousseff and Juan Manuel Santos, encouraged an increase in regional trade, economic development, and further economic cooperation among members in order to defend their growing economies.

Chavez, and other leaders such as Rafael Correa and Daniel Ortega, expressed hope that the bloc would work to further Latin American integration, end U.S. hegemony and consolidate control over regional affairs. Chavez, citing the Monroe Doctrine as the original confirmation of U.S. interference in the region, openly called for CELAC to replace the OAS: "As the years go by, CELAC is going to leave behind the old and worn-out OAS." Correa called for a new human rights commission to replace the Inter-American Commission on Human Rights. Other leaders argued that the organisation should be used as a tool to resolve regional disagreements and uphold democratic values, but not as a replacement of the OAS. Santos stated that he would like to see dialogue within the group over whether existing counter-drug regulations should be revised. The president of the Latin American Parliament (Parlatino) said he expects that Parlatino will become the main legislative institution of CELAC. Amongst the key issues on the agenda were the creation of a "new financial architecture," sanction for maintaining the legal status of coca in Bolivia and the rejection of the Cuban embargo by the U.S.
