= European Union, Latin America and the Caribbean Summit =

Meeting of heads of state and government

The European Union, Latin America and the Caribbean Summit (EU–LAC) is a biennial meeting of heads of state and government of Latin America, the Caribbean and the European Union.

== History ==
In the first EU–LAC summit, held in Rio de Janeiro between 28 June and 29 June 1999, participant nations agreed to develop a strategic partnership focused on strengthening democracy, the rule of law, international peace and political stability. The second meeting was carried out in Madrid in 2002, the third in Guadalajara in 2004, the fourth in Vienna in 2006 and the fifth was held in Lima in mid-May 2008. Major topics discussed at the Lima summit were free trade, food prices, which leaders were "deeply concerned by" and poverty, and sustainable development. The results of the event were rather disappointing, as very little was achieved. The next round of talks took place in Brussels in June 2008. The sixth summit was held in Madrid in 2010. At this Summit, the Heads of State of the Latin America, Caribbean and European Union countries decided to create the EU–LAC Foundation as a tool to strengthen the biregional partnership.

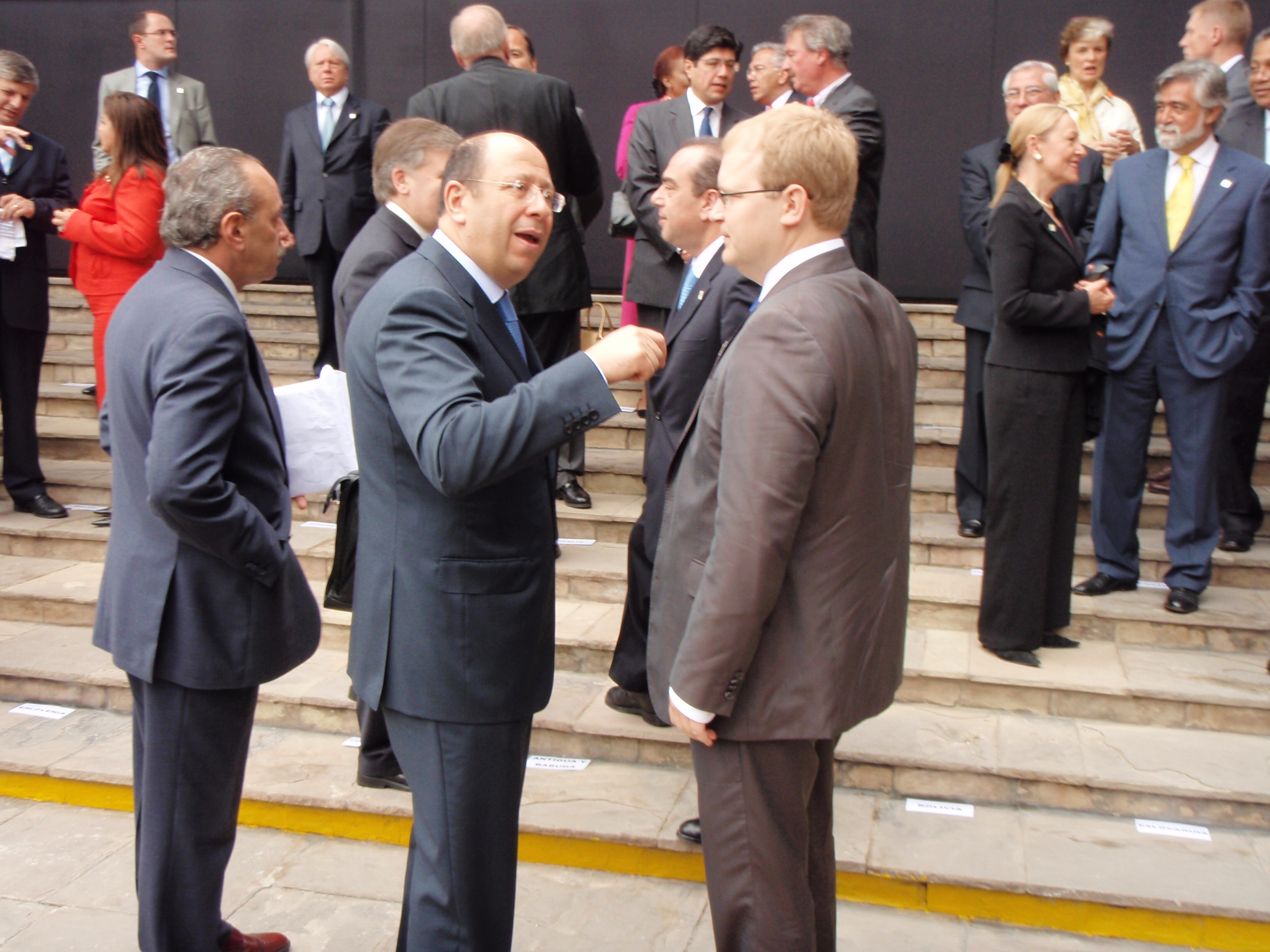
Summit in Lima (2008)

== Summits ==
EU–LAC Summits

- 1st Summit: 1999 in Rio de Janeiro
- 2nd Summit: 2002 in Madrid
- 3rd Summit: 2004 in Guadalajara
- 4th Summit: 2006 in Vienna
- 5th Summit: 2008 in Lima
- 6th Summit: 2010 in Madrid

EU–CELAC Summits

- 1st Summit: 2013 in Santiago de Chile
- 2nd Summit: 2015 in Brussels
- 3rd Summit: 2023 in Brussels
- 4th Summit: 2025 in Colombia

== See also ==
- Euro-Latin American Parliamentary Assembly
- Community of Latin American and Caribbean States
- EU–LAC Foundation
- CARIFORUM
- Eurosphere
- ACP countries
- Asia–Europe Meeting
