= 2021 CELAC summit =

Summit of the Community of Latin American and Caribbean States

VI CELAC Summit
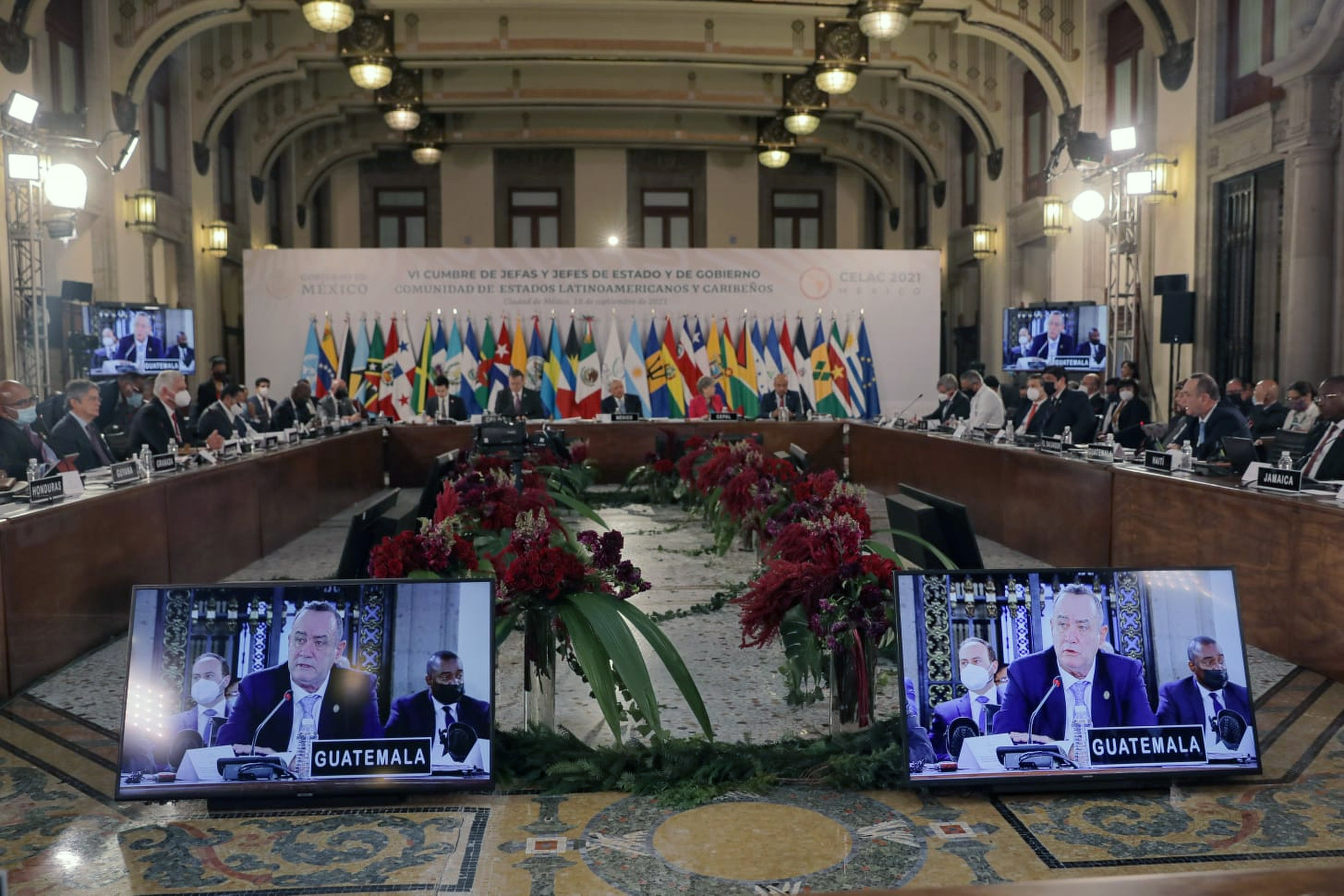
- Host country: Mexico
- Date: 18 September 2021
- Cities: Mexico City
- Participants: CELAC: Antigua and Barbuda; Argentina; Bahamas; Barbados; Belize; Bolivia; Chile; Colombia; Costa Rica; Cuba; Dominica; Dominican Republic; Ecuador; El Salvador; Grenada; Guatemala; Guyana; Haiti; Honduras; Jamaica; Mexico; Nicaragua; Panama; Paraguay; Peru; Saint Kitts and Nevis; Saint Lucia; Saint Vincent and the Grenadines; Suriname; Trinidad and Tobago; Uruguay; Venezuela
- Chair: Andrés Manuel López Obrador
- Follows: 2017 CELAC summit

The VI Summit of the Community of Latin American and Caribbean States (CELAC) took place on 18 September 2021, in the National Palace of Mexico in Mexico City.

In preparation for the event, the XXI summit of foreign ministers of the CELAC took place on 24 July 2021, at Chapultepec Castle in Mexico City, in the context of the commemoration of the 238th anniversary of the birth of Simón Bolívar.

During the VI Summit, the president of Mexico, Andrés Manuel López Obrador, proposed the creation of a multilateral organization resembling the European Union to resolve conflicts in the region, promote unity in the Americas, and negotiate with other regional economic blocs. The succession of the Pro Tempore president of CELAC was also to be decided, with both Argentina and Saint Vincent and the Grenadines as successor candidates, but ultimately no decision was taken.

The Summit concluded with the adoption of the Political Declaration of Mexico City.
