= 2015 CELAC summit =

III CELAC Summit
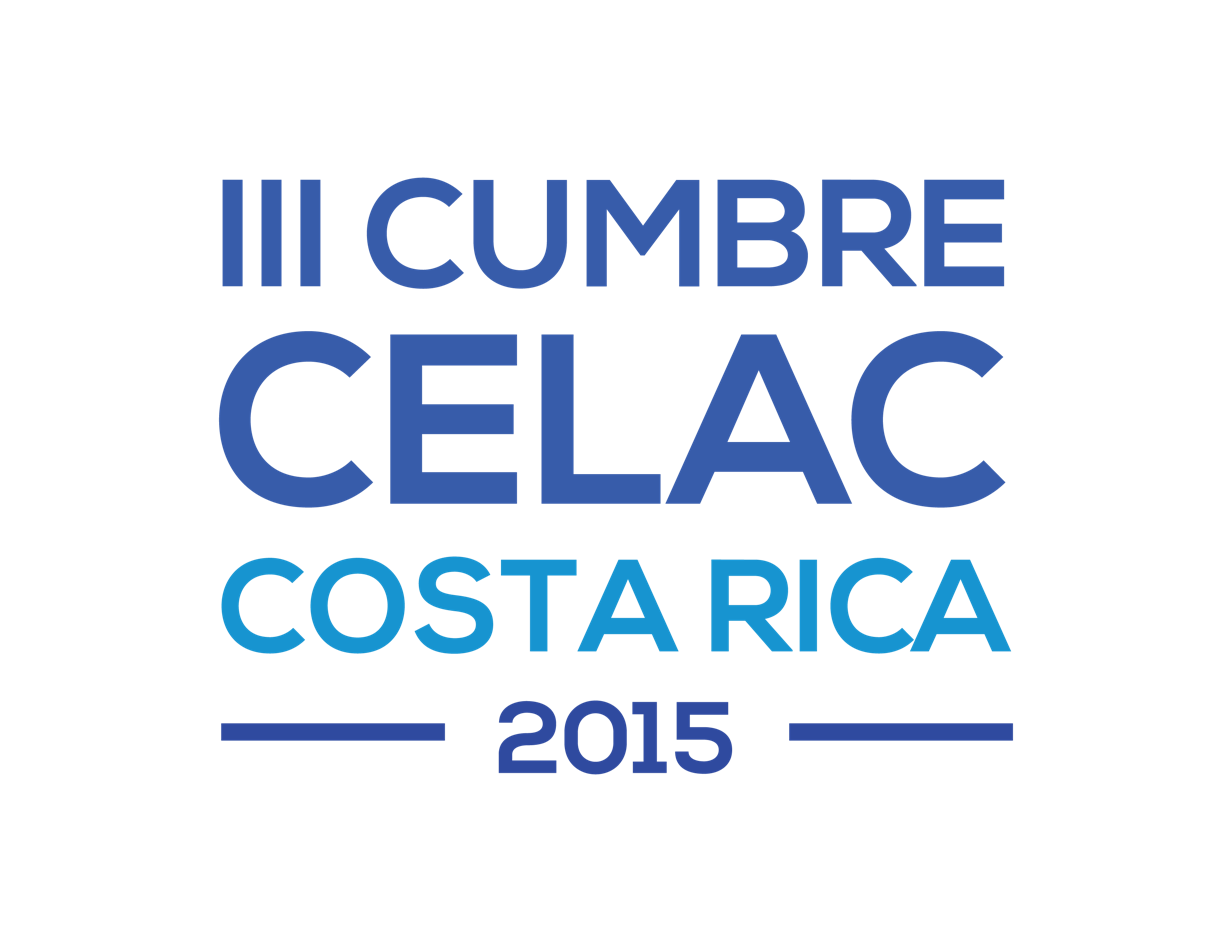
- Host country: Costa Rica
- Date: January 28–29, 2015
- Cities: San José
- Participants: CELAC: Antigua and Barbuda; Argentina; Bahamas; Barbados; Belize; Bolivia; Brazil; Chile; Colombia; Costa Rica; Cuba; Dominica; Dominican Republic; Ecuador; El Salvador; Grenada; Guatemala; Guyana; Haiti; Honduras; Jamaica; Mexico; Nicaragua; Panama; Paraguay; Peru; Saint Kitts and Nevis; Saint Lucia; Saint Vincent and the Grenadines; Suriname; Trinidad and Tobago; Uruguay; Venezuela
- Follows: 2014 CELAC summit
- Precedes: 2016 CELAC summit
- Website: www.celac2015.go.cr

The III CELAC summit or 2015 CELAC summit was the third ordinary heads of state summit of the Community of Latin American and Caribbean States. It was held on 28 and 29 January 2015 in San José, Costa Rica.
