= President pro tempore of the Community of Latin American and Caribbean States =

Presidency pro tempore of the Community of Latin American and Caribbean States

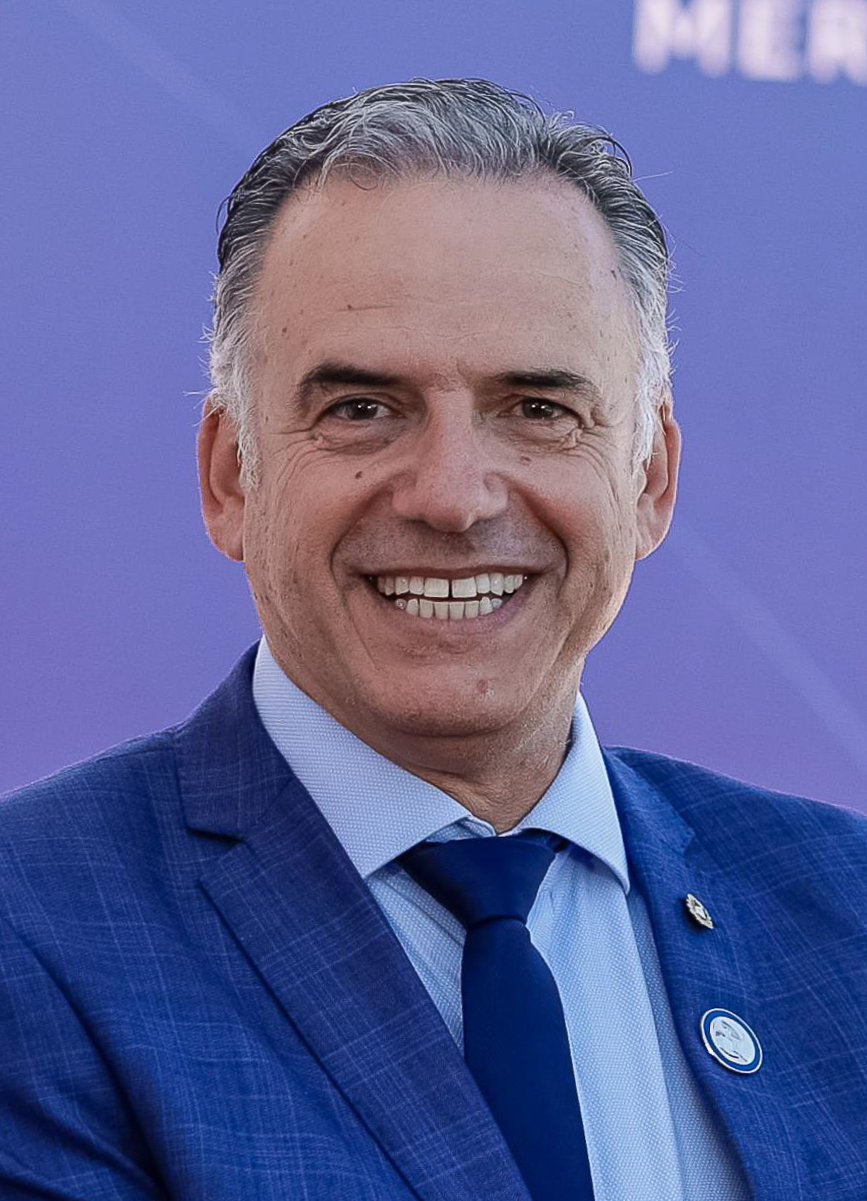
- Incumbent (Uruguay) Yamandú Orsi since 21 March 2026
- Constituting instrument: Community of Latin American and Caribbean States
- Inaugural holder: (Chile) Sebastián Piñera
- Formation: 3 February 2011; 15 years ago

The Presidency pro tempore of the Community of Latin American and Caribbean States is the office that represents the Community of Latin American and Caribbean States in international events.

== List of pro tempore presidents ==
#	Country	Portrait	President	Symbol	Party	Term start	Term end
1	Chile		Sebastián Piñera		National Renewal	3 December 2011	28 January 2013
2	Cuba		Raúl Castro		Communist Party of Cuba	28 January 2013	29 January 2014
3	Costa Rica		Laura Chinchilla		National Liberation Party	29 January 2014	8 May 2014
4	Costa Rica		Luis Guillermo Solís		Citizens' Action Party	8 May 2014	29 January 2015
5	Ecuador		Rafael Correa		PAIS Alliance	29 January 2015	27 January 2016
6	Dominican Republic		Danilo Medina		Dominican Liberation Party	27 January 2016	25 January 2017
7	El Salvador		Salvador Sánchez Cerén		Farabundo Martí National Liberation Front	25 January 2017	14 January 2019
8	Bolivia		Evo Morales		Movement for Socialism	14 January 2019	10 November 2019
9	Bolivia		Jeanine Áñez		Social Democratic Movement	12 November 2019	8 January 2020 (Note: Pro tempore presidency is assigned to countries and it automatically passes to the next president after elections. After the 2019 Bolivian political crisis, Jeanine Áñez would become pro tempore president of CELAC. However, Mexico called for a new CELAC summit on its own. Jeanine Áñez denounced that the summit should be called for by Bolivia. As the result of this dispute, Jeanine Áñez did not attend to the CELAC summit and did not formally pass the pro tempore presidency.)
10	Mexico		Andrés Manuel López Obrador		National Regeneration Movement	8 January 2020	7 January 2022
11	Argentina		Alberto Fernández		Justicialist Party	7 January 2022	24 January 2023
12	Saint Vincent and the Grenadines		Ralph Gonsalves		Unity Labour Party	24 January 2023	1 March 2024
13	Honduras		Xiomara Castro		Libre	1 March 2024	9 April 2025
14	Colombia		Gustavo Petro		Humane Colombia	9 April 2025	21 March 2026
15	Uruguay		Yamandú Orsi		Broad Front	21 March 2026	incumbent
