= EU–LAC Foundation =

International organisation

European Union-Latin America and Caribbean Foundation
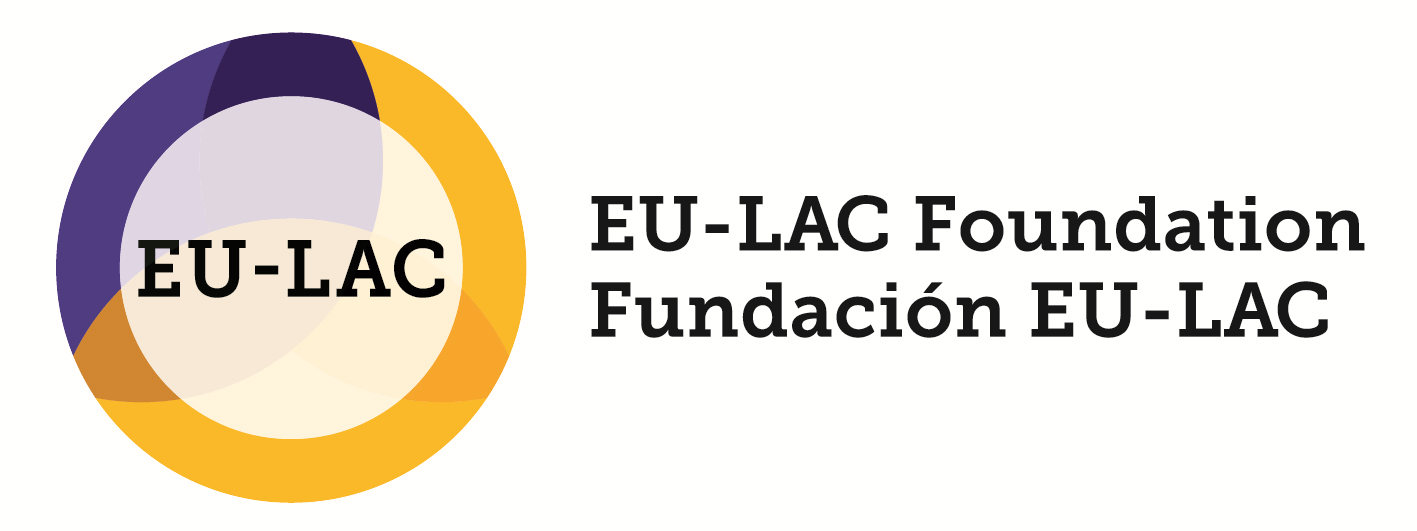
- Logo
- Abbreviation: EU–LAC Foundation
- Formation: 2010 Foundation under German civil law
- Type: International Organisation
- Legal status: 2019 International Organisation under international public law
- Headquarters: Hamburg, Germany
- Members: 61 members
- Official languages: English; Spanish
- President: José Antonio Arróspide del Busto (Peru)
- Executive Director: Alberto Brunori (Italy)
- Website: https://eulacfoundation.org/en

The European Union – Latin America and Caribbean Foundation (EU–LAC Foundation) is an international organisation created in 2010 by the Heads of State and Government of the European Union (EU), Latin America and Caribbean (LAC) with the mission of strengthening and promoting the strategic partnership between both regions, improving its visibility and encouraging the participation of the respective civil societies.

Established in 2011 in Hamburg, Germany, where it is based, the Foundation is a tool for bi-regional relations. Its activities are aimed at nurturing intergovernmental dialogue, in particular in several strategic thematic areas, which allows the Foundation to be a key actor in the deepening and dynamization of the bi-regional strategic association. The Foundation has 61 members: 33 member states from Latin America and the Caribbean, 27 Member States of the European Union, and the European Union itself through its institutions.

== History ==
During the fifth European Union, Latin America and the Caribbean Summit (EU–LAC Summit), held in Lima, Peru, on 16 May 2008, the initiative towards the creation of a bi-regional organization was launched by the Heads of State and Government of LAC and the EU.

At the sixth EU–LAC Summit, held in Madrid, Spain, on 18 May 2010, the decision on the creation of the EU–LAC Foundation was launched by the Heads of State and Government of the EU and LAC, the President of the European Council and the President of the European Commission. The Foundation was created as a tool for strengthening the bi-regional partnership and as a means of stimulating debate on common strategies and actions.

The EU–LAC Foundation formally started its work on 7 November 2011 with a transitional foundation status under German civil law. It is based in the Free and Hanseatic City of Hamburg, Germany.

The agreement establishing the EU–LAC Foundation as an international organization with legal personality under public international law was opened for signature during the CELAC and EU Foreign Ministers Meeting in Santo Domingo, the Dominican Republic on 25 October 2016 and entered into force on 17 May 2019.

== Members ==
The Foundation consists of 61 members: 33 member states from Latin America and the Caribbean, 27 member states from the European Union, and the EU itself through its institutions.

Since 2010, the Community of Latin American and Caribbean States (CELAC) is the EU's counterpart in the bi-regional partnership process. The CELAC is composed of the 33 countries of Latin America and the Caribbean.

Complete list of the members of the EU–LAC Foundation:

=== Latin American and Caribbean Members ===
- Antigua and Barbuda
- Argentina
- (The Bahamas) Bahamas
- Barbados
- Belize
- Bolivia
- Brazil
- Chile
- Colombia
- Costa Rica
- Cuba
- Dominica
- Dominican Republic
- Ecuador
- El Salvador
- Grenada
- Guatemala
- Guyana
- Haiti
- Honduras
- Jamaica
- Mexico
- Nicaragua
- Panama
- Paraguay
- Peru
- (Saint Kitts and Nevis) St Kitts and Nevis
- (Saint Lucia) St Lucia
- (Saint Vincent and the Grenadines) St Vincent and the Grenadines
- Suriname
- Trinidad and Tobago
- Uruguay
- Venezuela

=== EU Members States ===
- The European Union
- Austria
- Belgium
- Bulgaria
- Croatia
- Cyprus
- Czech Republic
- Denmark
- Estonia
- Finland
- France
- Germany
- Greece
- Hungary
- (Republic of Ireland) Ireland
- Italy
- Latvia
- Lithuania
- Luxembourg
- Malta
- Netherlands
- Poland
- Portugal
- Romania
- Slovakia
- Slovenia
- Spain
- Sweden

== Objectives ==
The objectives of the foundation are:

1. Contribute to the strengthening of the CELAC-EU bi-regional partnership process involving participation and inputs of civil society and other social actors;
2. Encourage further mutual knowledge and understanding between both regions;
3. Enhance the mutual visibility between both regions, as well as of the bi-regional partnership itself.

== Structure ==
The structure of the foundation comprises the Board of Governors, the President, and the Executive Director.

=== Board of Governors ===
The EU–LAC Foundation's Board of Governors oversees the management of the Foundation and ensures that the Foundation works towards its goals.

The Board of Governors has 61 members representing each of the members of the EU–LAC Foundation. The Board of Governors meets at least twice a year and is co-chaired by the CELAC and EU presidencies.

=== President ===
Every four years, the Board of Governors selects an ad-honorem President, who has mainly representation functions. The President's office alternates between a national of an EU member state and a national of a Latin American or Caribbean state. If the appointed President comes from an EU member state, the Executive Director must be a citizen of a Latin American or Caribbean state and vice versa.

- 2011–2015: Benita Ferrero-Waldner, (Austria), former Minister of Foreign Affairs of Austria and former EU Commissioner for Foreign Affairs and Neighbourhood, and Trade
- 2016–2020: Leonel Fernández, (Dominican Republic), former President of the Dominican Republic and President of the Global Democracy and Development Foundation (FUNGLODE)
- 2020–2024: Leire Pajín Iraola, (Spain), former Minister of Health, Social Services and Equality and Director of International Development at IS Global
- 2024-2025: José Antonio García Belaúnde, (Peru) former Minister of Foreign Affairs of Peru
- since 2025: José Antonio Arróspide del Busto

=== Executive Director ===
The Executive Director is the legal representative of the EU–LAC Foundation. The Executive Director is elected by the Board of Governors every four years, based on the recommendation of the regional group that holds the position of Executive Director for that period. If the selected Executive Director is from an EU member state, the selected President must be a citizen of a Latin American or Caribbean state and vice versa.

- 2011–2015: Jorge Valdez Carrillo, (Peru)
- 2016–2020: Paola Amadei, (Italy)
- 2020–2024: Adrián Bonilla, (Ecuador)
- since 2024: Alberto Brunori, (Italy)

== Financing ==
The EU–LAC Foundation is funded by voluntary contributions from its members.

== See also ==
- EU–LAC Summit (European Union, Latin America and the Caribbean Summit)
- Latin America and Caribbean
