= I Latin American and Caribbean Summit on Integration and Development =

- Host country: Brazil
- Date: 16–17 December 2008
- Participants: 32 states: Antigua and Barbuda; Argentina; Bahamas; Barbados; Belize; Bolivia; Brazil; Chile; Colombia; Costa Rica; Cuba; Dominica; Dominican Republic; Ecuador; El Salvador; Grenada; Guatemala; Guyana; Haiti; Honduras; Jamaica; Mexico; Nicaragua; Panama; Paraguay; Peru; Saint Kitts and Nevis; Saint Lucia; Saint Vincent and the Grenadines; Suriname; Trinidad and Tobago; Uruguay; Venezuela
- Precedes: Latin American and Caribbean Unity Summit

The I Latin American and Caribbean Summit on Integration and Development (CALC) was a summit of heads Latin American and Caribbean countries held on 16–17 December 2008 in Costa do Sauipe, Bahia, Brazil. It was organized at the initiative of the Lula administration with the goal of building cooperation mechanism with greater autonomy from the United States. Most heads of state from Latin America and the Caribbean states attended, with the exception of President of Colombia Álvaro Uribe and President of Peru Alan García. The summit finished with the signing of the Bahia Declaration, a common agenda establishing the following priorities: cooperation between mechanism of regional and subregional integration, the 2008 financial crisis, energy, infrastructures, social development and eradication of hunger and poverty, food security, sustainable development, natural disasters, human rights promotion, migration, South–South cooperation and Latin America and Caribbean projection.

The heads of state summit was followed by a ministerial summit in November 2009 in Montego Bay, Jamaica to prepare an action plan to develop the agenda agreed in the I CALC summit. The II CALC summit took place in February 2010, together with the XXI Rio Summit, as part of the Latin American and Caribbean Unity Summit.

== Bibliography ==
- Rojas Aravena, Francisco; Altmann Borbón, Josette; Beirute Brealey, Tatiana (2012). "Integración Política: Un nuevo camino hacia la Integración Latinoamericana". In Altmann Borbón, Josette (ed.). América Latina: Caminos de la integración regional (PDF) (in Spanish). Latin American Social Sciences Institute. pp. 11–48. ISBN 978-9977-68-240-2. Archived from the original (PDF) on 26 October 2021.
