= Community of Latin American and Caribbean States =

Bloc of Latin American and Caribbean states

- Logo

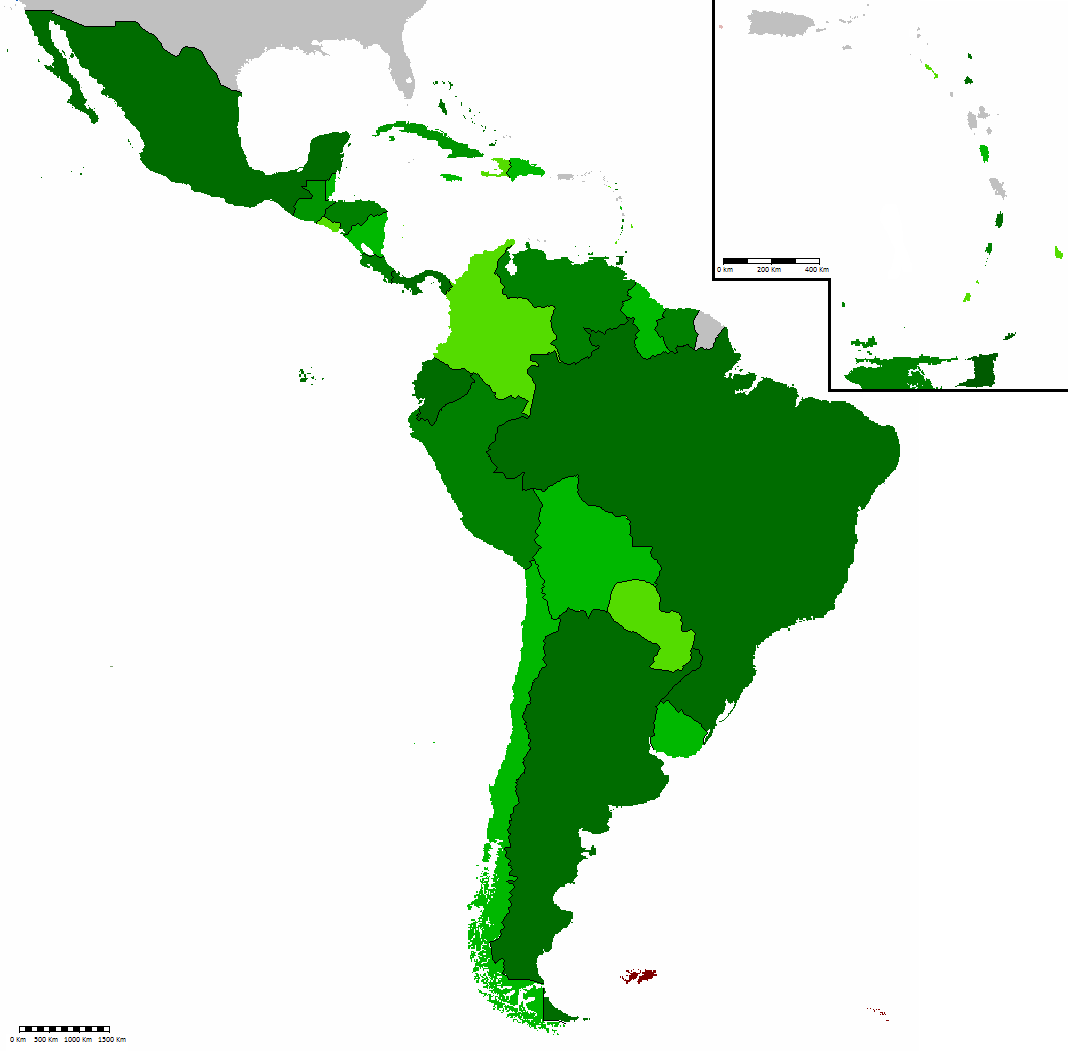
- Map of the Americas indicating CELAC members: Member countries Claimed territories^{a}
- Official languages: Spanish; Portuguese; French; English; Dutch
- Demonyms: Latin American; Caribbean
- Membership: 33 member states

Leaders
  - President pro tempore: (Uruguay) Yamandú Orsi
- Establishment: February 23, 2010

Population
  - 2011 estimate: 600,000,000
- 1. Falkland Islands and South Georgia and the South Sandwich Islands are claimed by Argentina.

The Community of Latin American and Caribbean States (CELAC) (Note: Spanish: Comunidad de Estados Latinoamericanos y Caribeños; Portuguese: Comunidade de Estados Latino-Americanos e Caribenhos; French: Communauté des États latino-américains et caribéens; Dutch: Gemeenschap van Latijns-Amerikaanse en Caraïbische Staten) is a bloc of Latin American and Caribbean states, consisting of 33 countries, and has five official working languages. It is seen as an alternative to the Organization of American States (OAS) and includes all OAS member states (except the United States and Canada) plus includes the nations of Nicaragua and Cuba. Initially proposed on February 23, 2010, at the Rio Group–Caribbean Community Unity Summit, CELAC is seen as the successor of the Rio Group and the Latin American and Caribbean Summit on Integration and Development (CALC). CELAC was created to deepen Latin American integration and to reduce hegemony within the politics and economics of the region. The date of creation was on December 3, 2011, in Caracas, Venezuela, with the signing of the Declaration of Caracas. As of 2013, CELAC possesses a population of roughly 600 million.

== History ==
=== 2008–2010: Brazil and Mexico initiatives ===
The immediate predecessor of the CELAC is the Rio Group. Formed in 1986, it gathered 24 Latin American and Caribbean countries around summits to cooperate regional policy issue independently of the United States.

On 16–17 December 2008, the I Latin American and Caribbean Summit on Integration and Development (CALC) took place in Costa do Sauipe, Bahia, Brazil. It was organized at the initiative of the Lula administration with the goal of building cooperation mechanism with greater autonomy from the United States and Canada. Most heads of state from Latin America and the Caribbean states attended, with the exception of President of Colombia Álvaro Uribe and President of Peru Alan García. The summit finished with the signing of the Bahia Declaration, a common agenda establishing the following priorities: cooperation between mechanism of regional and subregional integration, the 2008 financial crisis, energy, infrastructures, social development and eradication of hunger and poverty, food security, sustainable development, natural disasters, human rights promotion, migration, South–South cooperation and Latin America and Caribbean projection.

In 2008, the Calderón administration of Mexico proposed the creation of the Latin American and the Caribbean Union (Spanish: Unión Latinoamericana y del Caribe, ULC). The proposal was formalized on 27 March 2009 at Rio Group meeting. At the initiative of Mexico, the XXI Rio Summit and the II CALC summit were held together on 22–23 February 2010 in Playa del Carmen, Mexico. The joint summit was named the Latin American and Caribbean Unity Summit and the 33 attending states decided to create the Community of Latin American and Caribbean States (CELAC), which would be formally established in 2011.

Hugo Chávez, Luiz Inácio Lula da Silva and Rafael Correa were among the other prominent leaders who praised the creation of CELAC. In July 2010, CELAC selected President of Venezuela Hugo Chávez and President of Chile Sebastián Piñera, as co-chairs of the forum to draft statutes for the organization.

The announcement prompted debate and discussion across Latin America and the Caribbean about whether it was more beneficial to have close ties with the U.S. and Canada or to work independently.

An editorial in Brazil's Estadão newspaper said, "CELAC reflects the disorientation of the region's governments in relation to its problematic environment and its lack of foreign policy direction, locked as it is into the illusion that snubbing the United States will do for Latin American integration what 200 years of history failed to do."

=== 2011: Founding ===
CELAC's inaugural summit was due to be held in mid-2011, but was postponed because of the ill-health of Hugo Chávez, president of the host nation, Venezuela. The summit was instead held on December 2 and 3, 2011, in Caracas. It primarily focused on the global economic crisis and its effects on the region. Several leaders, including presidents Cristina Fernández de Kirchner, Dilma Rousseff and Juan Manuel Santos, encouraged an increase in regional trade, economic development, and further economic cooperation among members in order to defend their growing economies.

Chávez, and other leaders such as Rafael Correa and Daniel Ortega, expressed hope that the bloc would work to further Latin American integration, end U.S. hegemony and consolidate control over regional affairs. Chávez, citing the Monroe Doctrine as the original confirmation of U.S. interference in the region, openly called for CELAC to replace the OAS: "As the years go by, CELAC is going to leave behind the old and worn-out OAS." Correa called for a new human rights commission to replace the Inter-American Commission on Human Rights. Other leaders argued that the organisation should be used as a tool to resolve regional disagreements and uphold democratic values, but not as a replacement of the OAS. Santos stated that he would like to see dialogue within the group over whether existing counter-drug regulations should be revised. The president of the Latin American Parliament (Parlatino) said he expects that Parlatino will become the main legislative institution of CELAC. Amongst the key issues on the agenda were the creation of a "new financial architecture," sanction for maintaining the legal status of coca in Bolivia and the rejection of the Cuban embargo by the U.S.

United States President Barack Obama's senior adviser on Latin America, Daniel Restrepo, informed reporters from Miami that the U.S. government would "watch and see what direction CELAC takes".

=== Ongoing ===
Brazil decided to suspend its participation in the Community of Latin American and Caribbean States in January 2020 under the administration of Jair Bolsonaro. Following the 2022 Brazilian general election, newly elected president Luiz Inácio Lula da Silva signalled his intention to rejoin the Community of Latin American and Caribbean States, and effectively did so in the first days of his administration.

In June 2023, CELAC recognized the Latin American and Caribbean character of the island of Puerto Rico and “calls on the UN General Assembly to examine the question of Puerto Rico in its entirety and in all its aspects, and rule on this matter as soon as possible”.

The bloc also produced the Declaration of Buenos Aires (CELAC): Glaring omissions in relation to indigenous peoples of 2023 to consider a regional perspective for indigenous peoples of the hemisphere.

== Organization ==
The CELAC has six organs:

- The summit of Heads of State and Government.
- The meeting of Ministers of Foreign Affairs.
- The meeting of National Coordinators.
- The pro tempore presidency.
- The Troika.

The pro tempore presidency is the main representative of the CELAC. The troika is composed by the current pro tempore presidency, its predecessor, its successor and the presidency of the CARICOM.

=== Forums ===
The regional body has joint forums that work with external global entities, including China the European Union, Japan and India.

=== Summits of Heads of State and Government ===
CELAC Summits
Summit	Year	Host country	Host city
*	2010	Mexico	Playa del Carmen
*	2011	Venezuela	Caracas
I	January 2013	Chile	Santiago
II	January 2014	Cuba	Havana
III	January 28–29, 2015	Costa Rica	Belén, Heredia
IV	January 27, 2016	Ecuador	Quito
V	January 24–25, 2017	Dominican Republic	Punta Cana
*	2018	El Salvador	Did not take place
*	2019	Bolivia	Did not take place
*	2020	Mexico	Did not take place
VI	2021	Mexico	Mexico City
VII	2023	Argentina	Buenos Aires
VIII	March 1–2, 2024	Saint Vincent and the Grenadines	Kingstown
IX	April 9, 2025	Honduras	Tegucigalpa
X	March 21, 2026	Colombia	Medellín

==== 2013 Summit – Chile ====
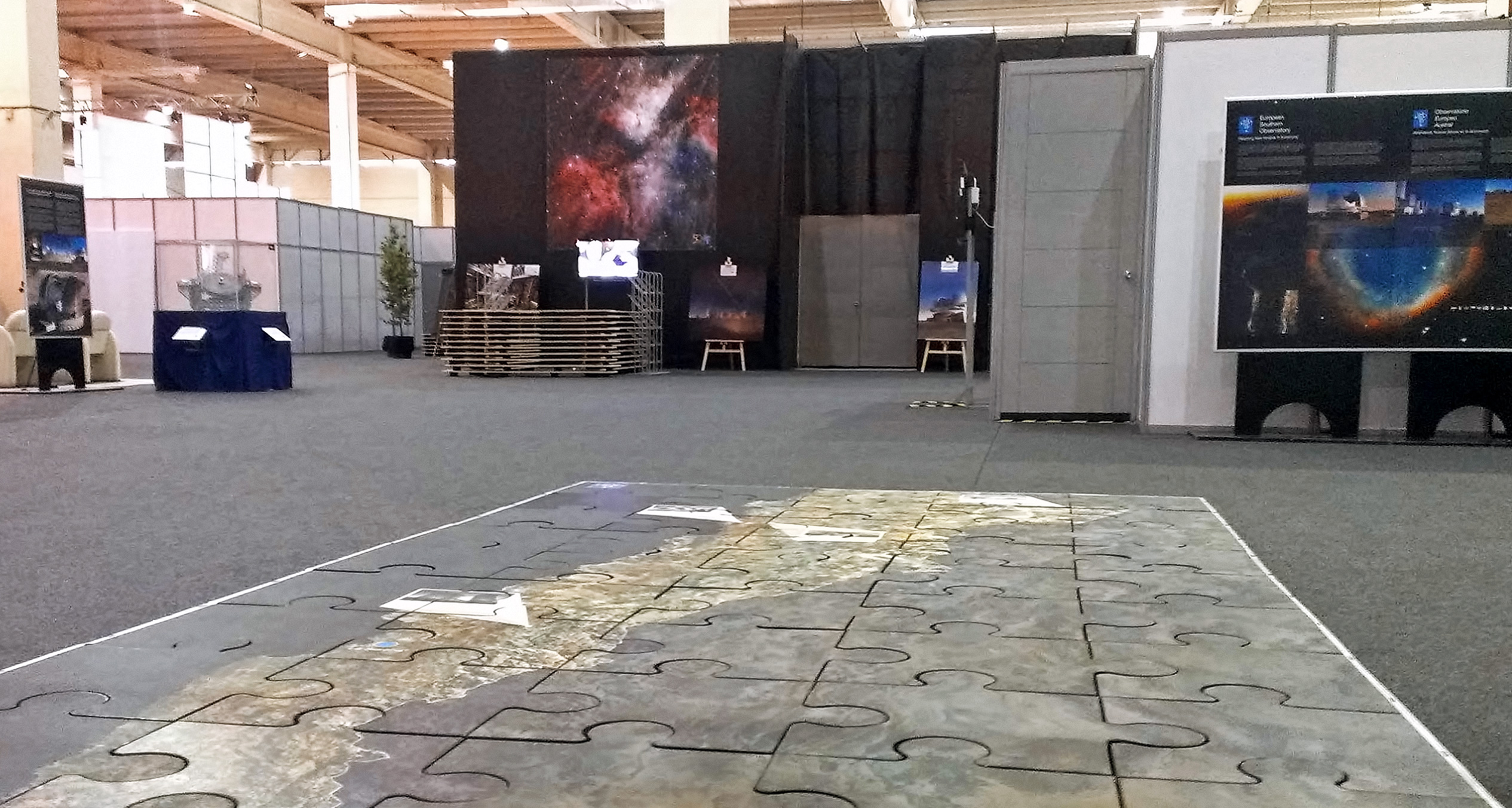
ESO exhibition area at the CELAC–EU summit in Santiago

The EU-LAC Foundation chose CELAC to be the main organization representative of the relationship between European and Latin American and Caribbean countries.

==== 2014 Summit – Cuba ====
During the summit, the region was declared a "peace zone". After three days and with the approval of participating representatives, a document with 83 focus points was created. It emphasized that, despite cultural and regional differences, unity between the participating countries is necessary in order to create progress. "Unity and the integration of our region must be gradually constructed, with flexibility, with respect to differences, diversity, and the sovereign right of each of our countries to choose our own forms of political and economic organization" stated the document. It also states which countries have been developing the best and how they are doing it in order for them to be a model for other countries.

The issue of poverty was widely discussed. Cuba's Raúl Castro pointed out that throughout Latin America and the Caribbean, people wanted a fairer distribution of wealth, access to affordable education, employment, better salaries, and the eradication of illiteracy. He argued that CELAC countries can work together, support each other, to create new plans and solutions for these problems.

==== 2016 Summit – Ecuador ====
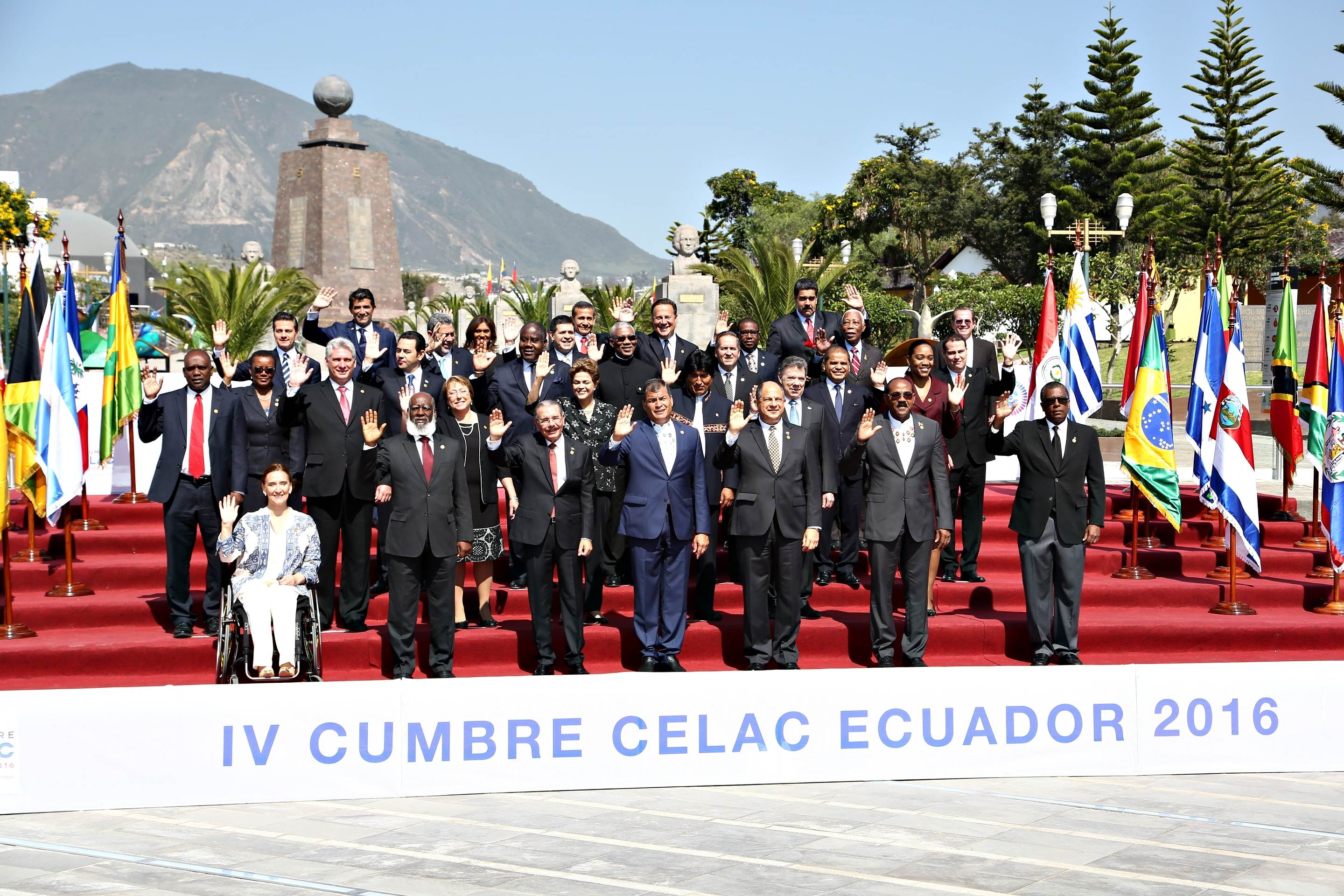
Official 2016 CELAC Summit portrait in Quito, Ecuador

== Member states ==
A clickable Euler diagram showing the relationships between various multinational organizations in the Americas

CELAC comprises 33 countries, speaking five different languages:

Eighteen Spanish-speaking countries

- Argentina
- Bolivia
- Chile
- Colombia
- Costa Rica
- Cuba
- Dominican Republic
- Ecuador
- El Salvador
- Guatemala
- Honduras
- Mexico
- Nicaragua
- Panama
- Paraguay
- Peru
- Uruguay
- Venezuela

Twelve English-speaking countries

- Antigua and Barbuda
- Bahamas
- Barbados
- Belize
- Dominica
- Grenada
- Guyana
- Jamaica
- Saint Kitts and Nevis
- Saint Lucia
- Saint Vincent and the Grenadines
- Trinidad and Tobago

One Dutch-speaking country

- Suriname

One French-speaking country

- Haiti

One Portuguese-speaking country

- Brazil

Observer countries

- Equatorial Guinea
- Portugal
- Spain

Twelve members are in South America. Portuguese-speaking Brazil suspended its membership in January 2020, alleging that the organization failed to "protect democracy" in member states. The decision was taken during the presidency of Jair Bolsonaro, who was himself accused of attacking Brazil's democratic institutions. Following the 2022 Brazilian general election, newly elected president Luiz Inácio Lula da Silva signalled his intention to rejoin. After taking office Lula reinstated Brazil's membership into the organization.

== Currencies ==
Member states within the bloc use numerous currencies for internal usage or for trade. Including: the Argentine peso, Bahamian dollar, Barbadian dollar, Belize dollar, Bolivian boliviano, Brazilian real, Chilean peso, Colombian peso, Costa Rican colón, Cuban peso, Dominican peso, Ecuadorian centavo coins, Guatemalan quetzal, Guyanese dollar, Haitian gourde, Honduran lempira, Jamaican dollar, Mexican peso, Nicaraguan córdoba, Panamanian balboa, Paraguayan guaraní, Peruvian sol, Surinamese dollar, Trinidad and Tobago dollar, Uruguayan peso, and the Venezuelan bolívar.

Some initiatives have been made towards shared currencies or currency unions, including the current existing: Caribbean guilder, Eastern Caribbean dollar, and the SUCRE. Additionally Argentina and Brazil have discussed the formation of a currency called the 'Sur' ("south") for bilateral trade, but this has not moved beyond planning stage. Some CELAC member nations formally use the United States dollar including: (Ecuador and El Salvador). Other nations have made moves to offer their own central bank digital currency.

== Indicators ==
The following table shows various data for CELAC member states, including area, population, economic output and income inequality, as well as various composite indices, including human development, viability of the state, rule of law, perception of corruption, economic freedom, state of peace, freedom of the press and democratic level.

Country	Area (km^{2}) 2015	Population 2015	GDP (PPP) (Intl. $) 2015	GDP (PPP) per capita (Intl. $) 2015	Income inequality 1992-2014 (latest available)	HDI 2015	FSI 2016	RLI 2016	CPI 2016	IEF 2017	GPI 2016	WPFI 2016	DI 2016
Antigua and Barbuda	440	91,818	2,117,532,266	23,062	—N/a	0.786	56.2	0.67	—N/a	—N/a	—N/a	—N/a	—N/a
Argentina	2,780,400	43,416,755	884,155,392,935	20,364	42.67	0.827	48.4	0.55	36	50.4	1.957	25.09	6.96
Bahamas, The	13,880	388,019	8,924,827,793	23,001	—N/a	0.792	51.6	0.61	66	61.1	—N/a	—N/a	—N/a
Barbados	430	284,215	4,662,763,817	16,406	—N/a	0.795	49.0	0.67	61	54.5	—N/a	—N/a	—N/a
Belize	22,970	359,287	3,048,017,325	8,484	53.26	0.706	66.0	0.47	—N/a	58.6	—N/a	20.61	—N/a
Bolivia	1,098,580	10,724,705	74,577,744,269	6,954	48.40	0.674	78.5	0.40	33	47.7	2.038	31.78	5.63
Brazil	8,515,770	207,847,528	3,198,897,964,239	15,391	51.48	0.754	65.3	0.55	40	52.9	2.176	32.62	6.90
Chile	756,096	17,948,141	419,386,742,725	23,367	50.45	0.847	41.9	0.68	66	76.5	1.635	19.23	7.78
Colombia	1,141,749	48,228,704	666,958,038,483	13,829	53.50	0.727	80.2	0.51	37	69.7	2.764	44.11	6.67
Costa Rica	51,180	4,807,850	74,976,669,841	15,595	48.53	0.776	45.1	0.68	58	65.0	1.699	11.10	7.88
Cuba	109,880	11,389,562	132,900,000,000^{b}	11,600^{b}	—N/a	0.775	66.3	—N/a	47	33.9	2.057	70.23	3.46
Dominica	750	72,680	789,634,652	10,865	—N/a	0.726	—N/a	0.60	59	63.7	—N/a	—N/a	—N/a
Dominican Republic	48,670	10,528,391	149,893,354,990	14,237	47.07	0.722	70.8	0.47	31	62.9	2.143	27.90	6.67
Ecuador	256,370	16,144,363	185,242,693,748	11,474	45.38	0.739	75.6	0.45	31	49.3	2.020	33.21	5.81
El Salvador	21,040	6,126,583	52,808,578,088	8,620	41.84	0.680	72.5	0.49	36	64.1	2.237	27.20	6.64
Grenada	340	106,825	1,448,391,593	13,559	—N/a	0.754	63.0	0.66	56	—N/a	—N/a	—N/a	—N/a
Guatemala	108,890	16,342,897	126,206,881,633	7,722	48.66	0.640	83.2	0.44	28	63.0	2.270	38.03	5.92
Guyana	214,970	767,085	5,769,805,304	7,522	44.55	0.638	70.9	0.49	34	58.5	2.105	27.07	6.25
Haiti	27,750	10,711,067	18,824,011,297	1,757	60.79	0.493	105.1	—N/a	20	49.6	2.066	24.66	4.02
Honduras	112,490	8,075,060	41,144,078,465	5,095	50.64	0.625	79.8	0.42	30	58.8	2.237	44.62	5.92
Jamaica	10,990	2,725,941	24,785,002,528	8,873	45.46	0.730	65.0	0.57	39	69.5	2.091	12.45	7.39
Mexico	1,964,380	127,017,224	2,157,817,248,941	16,988	48.21	0.762	70.4	0.46	30	63.6	2.557	49.33	6.47
Nicaragua	130,370	6,082,032	31,628,389,092	5,200	47.05	0.645	79.0	0.42	26	59.2	1.975	28.82	4.81
Panama	75,420	3,929,141	87,373,244,561	22,237	50.70	0.788	53.2	0.52	38	66.3	1.837	30.59	7.13
Paraguay	406,752	6,639,123	61,069,963,183	9,198	51.67	0.693	72.6	—N/a	30	62.4	2.037	33.63	6.27
Peru	1,285,220	31,376,670	393,125,472,102	12,529	44.14	0.740	72.0	0.51	35	68.9	2.057	29.99	6.65
Saint Kitts and Nevis	260	55,572	1,394,199,261	25,088	—N/a	0.765	—N/a	0.66	—N/a	—N/a	—N/a	—N/a	—N/a
Saint Lucia	620	184,999	2,024,690,870	10,944	42.58	0.735	—N/a	0.64	60	65.0	—N/a	—N/a	—N/a
Saint Vincent and the Grenadines	390	109,462	1,219,366,997	11,140	—N/a	0.722	—N/a	0.61	60	65.2	—N/a	—N/a	—N/a
Suriname	163,820	542,975	9,069,126,393	16,703	57.61	0.725	66.7	0.53	45	48.0	—N/a	16.70	6.77
Trinidad and Tobago	5,130	1,360,088	45,302,518,908	33,309	40.27	0.780	57.8	0.57	35	61.2	2.056	23.29	7.10
Uruguay	176,220	3,431,555	72,899,109,557	21,244	41.60	0.795	36.2	0.72	71	69.7	1.726	15.88	8.17
Venezuela	912,050	31,108,083	542,198,453,528^{c}	17,665^{c}	46.94	0.767	81.6	0.28	17	27.0	2.651	44.77	4.68
CELAC^{a}													
Country	Area (km^{2}) 2015	Population 2015	GDP (PPP) (Intl. $) 2015	GDP (PPP) per capita (Intl. $) 2015	Income inequality 1992-2014 (latest available)	HDI 2015	FSI 2016	RLI 2016	CPI 2016	IEF 2017	GPI 2016	WPFI 2016	DI 2016

- ^{a} CELAC total used for indicators 1 through 3; CELAC weighted average used for indicator 4; CELAC unweighted average used for indicators 5 through 13.
- ^{b} Data from CIA World Factbook for 2014.
- ^{c} Data refer to 2014.
Note: The colors indicate the country's global position in the respective indicator. For example, a green cell indicates that the country is ranked in the upper 25% of the list (including all countries with available data).

Highest quartile	Upper-mid (3rd quartile)	Lower-mid (2nd quartile)	Lowest quartile

== See also ==
- Andean Community
- Latin American Integration Association (ALADI)
- Bolivarian Alliance for the Peoples of Our America (ALBA)
- Caribbean Community (CARICOM)
- CAF – Development Bank of Latin America and the Caribbean
- Economy of Latin America and the Caribbean
- EU–LAC Foundation
- Forum of East Asia–Latin America Cooperation (FEALAC)
- Latin American economy
- Latin America and Caribbean Network Information Centre
- Latin American and Caribbean Economic Association
- Latin American and Caribbean Space Agency
- Lima Group
- Mercosur
- Rio Group
- Summit of the Americas
- Latin American Economic System (SELA)
- Union of South American Nations (UNASUR)
- United Nations Economic Commission for Latin America and the Caribbean

== Bibliography ==
- Rojas Aravena, Francisco; Altmann Borbón, Josette; Beirute Brealey, Tatiana (2012). "Integración Política: Un nuevo camino hacia la Integración Latinoamericana" (PDF). In Altmann Borbón, Josette (ed.). América Latina: Caminos de la integración regional (in Spanish). Latin American Social Sciences Institute. pp. 11–48. ISBN 978-9977-68-240-2. Archived from the original (PDF) on October 26, 2021.
