= 2017 CELAC summit =

V CELAC Summit
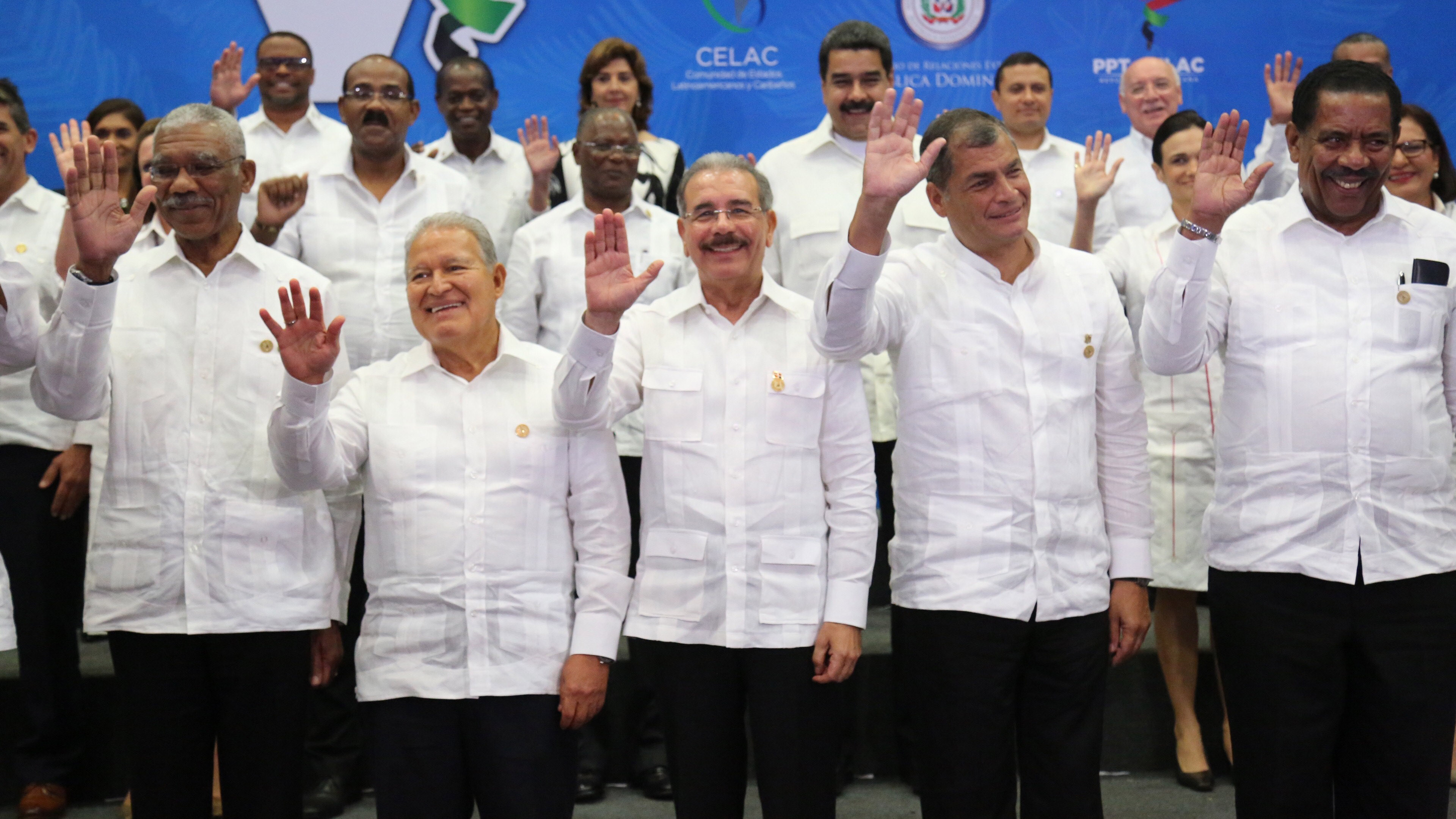
- Host country: Dominican Republic
- Date: January 24–25, 2017
- Cities: Punta Cana
- Participants: CELAC: Antigua and Barbuda; Argentina; Bahamas; Barbados; Belize; Bolivia; Brazil; Chile; Colombia; Costa Rica; Cuba; Dominica; Dominican Republic; Ecuador; El Salvador; Grenada; Guatemala; Guyana; Haiti; Honduras; Jamaica; Mexico; Nicaragua; Panama; Paraguay; Peru; Saint Kitts and Nevis; Saint Lucia; Saint Vincent and the Grenadines; Suriname; Trinidad and Tobago; Uruguay; Venezuela
- Follows: 2016 CELAC summit

The V CELAC summit or 2017 CELAC summit was the fifth ordinary heads of state summit of the Community of Latin American and Caribbean States. It was held on 24 and 25 January 2017 in Punta Cana, Dominican Republic.
