= Latin American and Caribbean Unity Summit =

Latin American and Caribbean Unity Summit XXI Rio Summit II Latin American and Caribbean Summit on Integration and Development
- Host country: Mexico
- Date: February 22–23, 2010
- Cities: Playa del Carmen
- Participants: CELAC founder states, except Honduras: Antigua and Barbuda; Argentina; Bahamas; Barbados; Belize; Bolivia; Brazil; Chile; Colombia; Costa Rica; Cuba; Dominica; Dominican Republic; Ecuador; El Salvador; Grenada; Guatemala; Guyana; Haiti; Jamaica; Mexico; Nicaragua; Panama; Paraguay; Peru; Saint Kitts and Nevis; Saint Lucia; Saint Vincent and the Grenadines; Suriname; Trinidad and Tobago; Uruguay; Venezuela
- Follows: I Latin American and Caribbean Summit on Integration and Development; XX Rio Summit
- Precedes: 2011 CELAC summit

Key points

The Latin American and Caribbean Unity Summit (Spanish: Cumbre de la Unidad de América Latina y el Caribe) was an international summit held on 22 and 23 February 2010 in Playa del Carmen, Mexico. The summit was the joint celebration of the XXI Rio Summit and the II Latin American and Caribbean Summit on Integration and Development (CALC).

32 countries participated. While the summit was intended to cover 33 countries, Honduras was excluded because of the coup d'état against Manuel Zelaya.

Participating states adopted the Cancún Declaration, calling for the creation of the Community of Latin American and Caribbean States, replacing the Rio Group and the Summit of Latin America and the Caribbean on Integration and Development (CALC).

== Bibliography ==
- Rojas Aravena, Francisco; Altmann Borbón, Josette; Beirute Brealey, Tatiana (2012). "Integración Política: Un nuevo camino hacia la Integración Latinoamericana". In Altmann Borbón, Josette (ed.). América Latina: Caminos de la integración regional (PDF) (in Spanish). Latin American Social Sciences Institute. pp. 11–48. ISBN 978-9977-68-240-2. Archived from the original (PDF) on 26 October 2021.
