= Cuba–Venezuela relations =

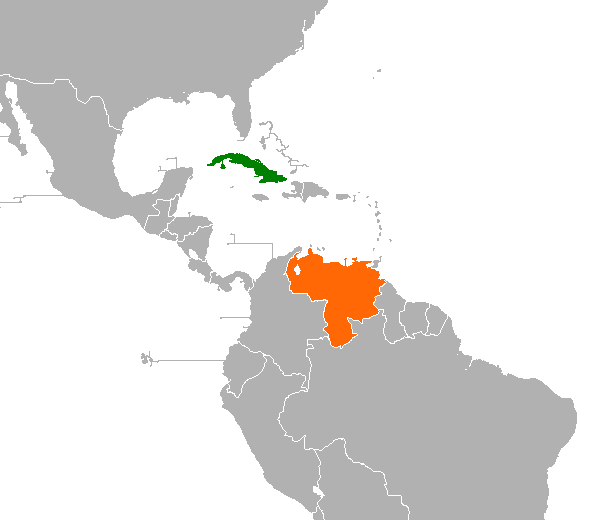

- Cuba: Venezuela

Relations between Cuba and Venezuela were established in 1902. The relationship deteriorated in the 1960s and Venezuela broke relations in late 1961 following the Betancourt Doctrine policy of not having ties with governments that had come to power by non-electoral means. A destabilizing factor was the Cuban support for the antigovernment guerrilla force that operates in remote rural areas. Relations were reestablished in 1974.

In 1999 the bilateral relation significantly improved during the Presidency of Hugo Chávez. Chávez formed a major alliance with First Secretary of the Communist Party of Cuba Fidel Castro and significant trade relationship with Cuba since his election in 1999. The warm relationship between the two countries continued to intensify. After decades of close ties in the Caribbean, several governments in the region started to distance from the United States. Hugo Chávez described Castro as his mentor and called Cuba "a revolutionary democracy".

The bilateral relation includes development aid, joint business ventures, large financial transactions, exchange of energy resources and information technology, and cooperation in the fields of intelligence service and military. A characteristic of Cuba-Venezuela ties is that both nations exchange assets with each other which are inexpensive for the sending country but of high significance for the receiving country.

== Early history ==
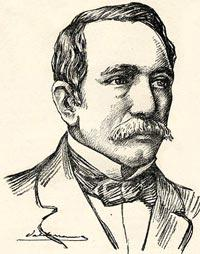
Narciso Lopez, Venezuelan adventurer who fought for Cuban independence

Venezuela and Cuba's ties go back to when Cuba was still under Spanish rule, when among the signers of the Act of Independence of Venezuela in 1811 was Francisco Javier Yánez native of Puerto Principe (currently Camagüey).

In June, 1817, Gregor MacGregor, a Scottish adventurer styling himself the "Brigadier General of the United Provinces of New Granada and Venezuela, and General-in-Chief of the Armies of the Two Floridas", came to Amelia Island under Spanish rule of Captaincy General of Cuba. MacGregor, purportedly commissioned by general Simón Bolívar, had raised funds and troops for a full-scale invasion of Florida. As word of his conduct in the Spanish American Wars of Independence reached the United States, many of the recruits in his invasion force deserted. Nonetheless, he overran the Fort San Carlos with a small force. The commander, Francisco Morales, struck the Spanish flag and fled to Havana. MacGregor raised his flag, the "Green Cross of Florida", a green cross on a white ground, over the fort and proclaimed the "Republic of the Floridas". After squandered much of the money on luxuries in September MacGregor left for the Bahamas and remained asilated in Nassau. James Irwin at command of the remanent troops defeated two Spanish assaults and were then joined by 300 men under Louis-Michel Aury. He directed his secretaries Pedro Gual Escandón and Vicente Pazos Kanki to draw up a constitution, and invited all of Florida to unite in throwing off the Spanish yoke. Aury controlled the Island for three months before surrendering to American forces, who held the island "in trust for Spain" until the Florida Purchase in 1819

In the celebrated Battle of Carabobo (1821) José Rafael de las Heras from Havana fought fiercely at side of the patriot army. Promoted to colonel by general Simón Bolívar himself, and before whom the Liberator would make the promise not to sheathe his sword until Cuba was free.

In 1823 the Conspiracy of Rayos y Soles de Bolivar was instigated by several Spanish Americans residing to support the struggle against the Spanish on the mainland and achieve Cuba's independence—though it has been asserted that the actual objective was annexation to Gran Colombia. Prominent among them were the Venezuelan merchant Juan Jorge Peoli, José Fernández Madrid, the last president of the First Republic of New Granada in 1816; Vicente Rocafuerte, a native of Guayaquil; the Peruvian writer Manuel Lorenzo de Vidaurre, who was settled in Camagüey; the Haitian Sévère Curtois; and José Antonio de Miralla, from the Río de la Plata region.

When the Spanish army withdrew in defeat to Cuba after the decisive Battle of Lake Maracaibo (1823), many Venezuelan royalists were exiled, as colonel Narciso Lopez, Marcos Maceo, who would be father of revolutionary Antonio Maceo, Calixto Garcia, who would be grandfather of Cuban Independence major general Calixto Garcia. They continued to serve the Spanish government in several military and administrative posts in Cuba and Spain. After they turned against Spanish rule, they became a partisan of the independist faction in Cuba. In 1848, during an arrest of Cuban revolutionaries, López fled to the United States where attempted to liberate the island and make an independent Cuba that would eventually join the United States as a slave state. The modern Flag of Cuba originates from his first expedition landed in Cárdenas, was designed by Lopez, as well as a local Cuban named Miguel Teurbe Tolon. In 1851 Lopez and many Americans of the second failed expedition were executed in Castle Salvador de La Punta of Havana.

On October 10, 1868, Carlos Manuel de Céspedes proclaimed the freedom of his slaves at his sugar estate, La Demajagua, and issued the call for the uprising known as *El Grito de Yara thereby initiating the War for Cuban independence from Spanish rule encouraged by revolts occurred barely three weeks after staged by the Revolutionary Committee of Puerto Rico called *El Grito de Lares*, led by the Rojas brothers Venezuelan exiles.

During the Ten Years War (1868- 1878), from Venezuela came, among others, José Miguel Barreto Pérez, Manuel María Garrido Páez, Cristobal Mendoza, Salomé Hernández Hernández, Cristóbal Acosta, José María Aurrecoechea Irigoyen and Amadeo Manuit. They all fought for the Independence of Cuba in several battles standing out for their bravery. Salomé Hernández died in Cuba because of illness, while Acosta, Aurrecoechea Irigoyen and Manuit, drowned the insular soil with their blood, helping to lay the foundations of the growing friendship and solidarity between Cuba and Venezuela. In Guaimaro, Carlos Manuel de Céspedes, president of the Republic in Arms on April 12, 1869, designates the Venezuelan Cristóbal Mendoza, Minister encharged of Foreign Relations, a young man among the Camagüeyans was the first to take up arms. Son of Cristóbal Mendoza, first President of Venezuela and friend of Bolivar who in 1813, after the defeat of the First Republic wrote to him in the following words: "Come without delay: come. The country needs it. I will go ahead conquering and you will continue organizing me; Because you are the man of the organization, as I am of the conquest." Cristóbal Mendoza reached the rank of colonel and died in front of the Spanish firing squad on December 30, 1870, two days after falling prisoner in Najasa, Camagüey.

In 1871 the president Antonio Guzman Blanco, supported the so-called "Venezuelan Expedition of the Vanguard", which landed in the eastern department of Cuba on June 17 commanded by the Cuban Brigadier de Quesada. In this attempt to liberate Cuba were 200 men, mostly Venezuelans, with 600 weapons, ammunition and 40 mules. In Camagüey, they fought the successful combat of Sabanas del Ciego, in which the Spanish forces were very decimated. But it was not an obstacle that the Cuban patriot Jose Marti, implying in Venezuelan politics, was expelled by Guzman Blanco in 1881. Marti must hurriedly leave Caracas, where he planned to live his exile, without being able to say farewell to his friends and return to New York.

Descendants of Bolivar and relatives of marechal Antonio Jose de Sucre, they fought in the War of the 95.

== 20th century ==
In 1902, during the presidency of Cipriano Castro, diplomatic relations were established between Venezuela and Cuba shortly after the latter's independence following the Spanish–American War. On July 14, 1903, Cuba and Venezuela signed their first treaty—an Extradition Treaty; however, the Treaty of Friendship, Commerce, and Navigation was never signed, even though it had been the primary aspiration of both countries. From 1902 to 1906, Cuban interests were handled by the consular staff of the United States of America accredited in Venezuela. On June 21, 1906, Cuba appointed its first diplomatic representative, Juan Rius Rivera, as Envoy Extraordinary and Minister Plenipotentiary on a Special Diplomatic Mission to initiate relations with the countries of Central and South America. Venezuela followed suit three years later, on July 5, 1909, with the appointment of Ignacio Andrade as Envoy Extraordinary and Plenipotentiary in Havana.

By 1913, an extradition treaty was signed between the two nations.

Throughout the years of Fidel Castro's guerilla which fight in the Sierra Maestra aimed at overthrowing the dictator Fulgencio Batista, there were numerous gestures and actions of Venezuelan solidarity with the 26th of July Movement. Following the ousting of dictator Marcos Perez Jimenez on January 23, 1958 a street campaign called "The March of Bolivar to the Sierra Maestra" raised $220,000 in funds, in addition to securing a substantial amount of arms and ammunition that were delivered to Cuban guerilla after being transported by Captain Hector Abdelnour Musa on board a C-46 airplane purchased for that purpose. These weapons, imported from the United States, came from the arsenals of the Venezuelan Army. This operation was managed by René Estévez, with the knowledge and approval of then-President Wolfgang Larrazabal, and the support of his brother, Carlos, and other officers, such as Hugo Trejo. In addition, Venezuelan broadcasters took the initiative to retransmit Radio Rebelde's war updates through Radio Rumbos and Radio Continent, disseminating information about the advances of Castro's guerillas and the setbacks of the dictator Batista.

The triumph of the Cuban Revolution, on January 1, 1959, ushered in a new era in bilateral relations between Havana and Caracas. On January 3, 1959, the Minister of State of Cuba requested from the Venezuelan Ministry of Foreign Affairs the recognition of the new Cuban Government, which emerged after the fall of Batista. On January 5, 1959, the Venezuelan Government recognizes the newly established Cuban government in Havana.

On January 23, 1959, Fidel Castro paid a historic visit to Venezuela. It was his first trip abroad since his triumphant entry into Havana on January 6, 1959. Over the course of his five-day stay in Caracas, Castro was hailed as a continental hero by Venezuelan people. The primary purpose of this visit was to express appreciation to the Venezuelan people for their valuable moral and material contribution to the cause of Cuba Libre.

Castro was honored with a welcoming ceremony offered by the Congress, and also at the Venezuela Central University, the Municipal Council of Caracas and the multitudinary meeting in the Plaza El Silencio. At the Venezuela Central University, he met a great poet, the Chilean Pablo Neruda, who spoke in a massive act of students and read his Canto a Bolivar. Luis Báez summarized what Neruda said: "In this painful and victorious hour that the peoples of America live, my poem with changes of place, can be understood directed to Fidel Castro, because in the struggles for freedom the fate of a Man to give confidence to the spirit of greatness in the history of our peoples.". Castro also met with President-elect Rómulo Betancourt, unsuccessfully requesting a loan and a new deal for Venezuelan oil.

=== 1960s–1999 ===
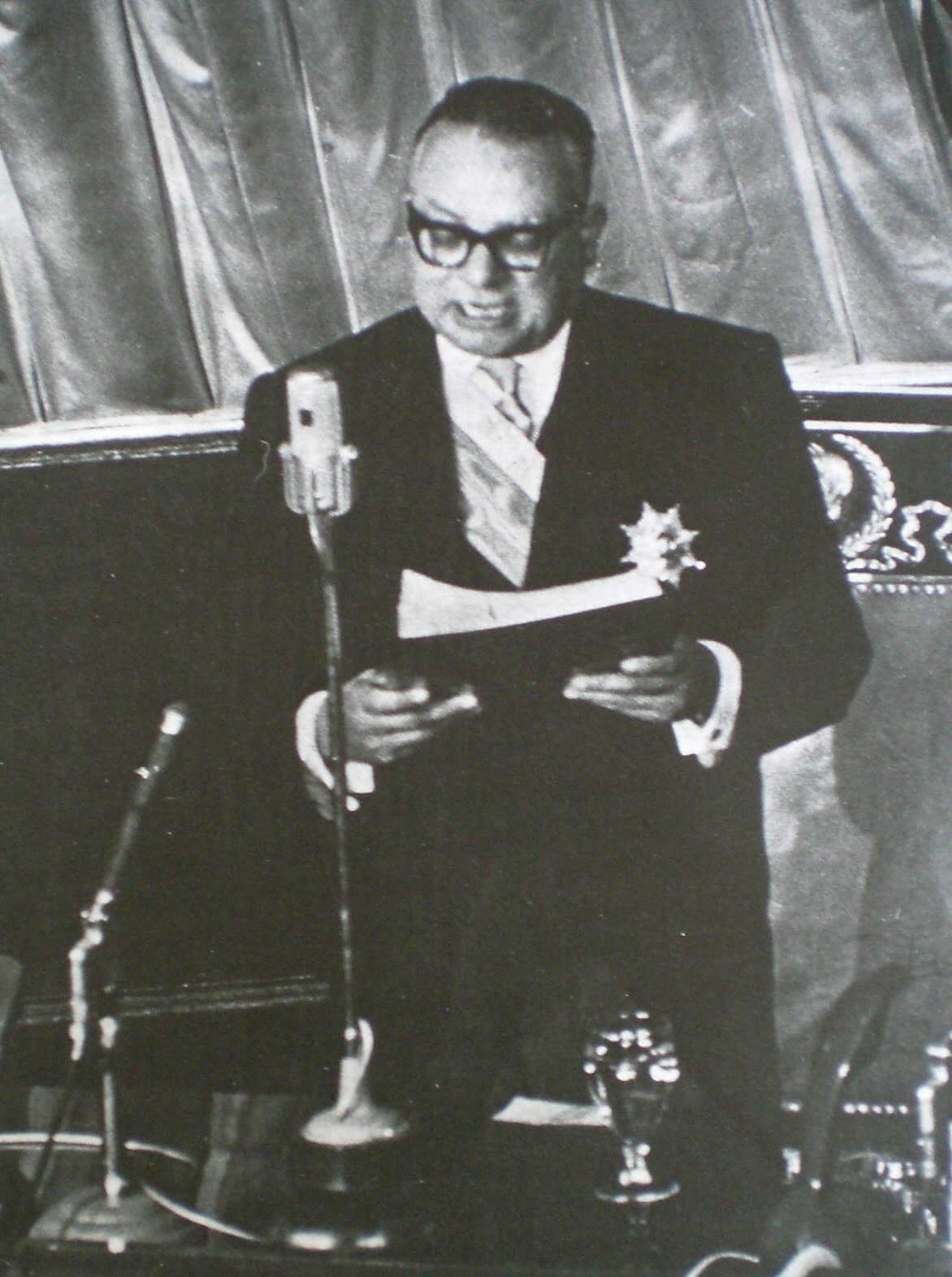
Rómulo Betancourt's inaugural address in 1959

Relations rapidly deteriorated after president Rómulo Betancourt came to power in February, 1959 as Castro sought to bring Venezuela's oil wealth into his own revolution. In the 1960s, Castro supplied combat training and arms to Venezuelan guerillas.

In November 1961, President Betancourt broke relations with Cuba following a policy, called the Betancourt Doctrine, of not having ties with governments that had come to power by non-electoral means. In January 1962, Venezuela voted to expel Cuba from the Organization of American States (OAS) and in July 1964 successfully petitioned to have OAS sanctions imposed on Cuba after the discovery of arms cache on a Venezuelan beach the previous November, dropped by Cubans for use by the Fuerzas Armadas de Liberación Nacional (FALN) guerrillas seeking to establish a Marxist government. Castro had inspired the guerrillas who threatened Betancourt's government and elections scheduled for 1963.

In 1966, Arnaldo Ochoa with the Venezuelan guerrilla commander Luben Petkoff, took a boat from Cuba to the shores of Falcón, Venezuela, on a secretive expedition. Along with 15 other Cuban troops sent by Castro to strengthen guerrillas fighting alongside Venezuelan militant Douglas Bravo, they attempted to attack the government of Raúl Leoni which ended in a major strategic loss and a large cost of human life. Only one year later, a dozen of Cuban and Venezuelan guerrillas trained by Cuba landed in May 1967 near Machurucuto and were intercepted by the Venezuelan Army. Soon after, the Venezuelan government held a press conference denouncing Cuban aggression against Venezuela and showing the two captured Cubans, Manuel Gil Castellanos and Pedro Cabrera Torres. Cuba was denounced by Venezuela to the OAS.

Once Betancourt and his similarly minded successor Raúl Leoni left office, Venezuela increasingly identified with the Third World and guerrilla activity waned, with Castro renouncing his exportation of his revolution, allowing for a tentative rapprochement. Diplomatic relations were restored in 1974 by government of Carlos Andrés Pérez, oil deliveries resumed, and Venezuela advocated Cuba's readmission to the OAS. Tensions occasionally resurfaced, especially over Venezuela's handling of those who attacked Cubana Flight 455 in 1977. Four terrorists associated with Coordination of United Revolutionary Organizations, a CIA linked organization, bombed Cubana Flight 455. A trial was held in Venezuela and Freddy Lugo and Hernán Ricardo Lozano both received 20 years in prison. Tensions rose after Orlando Bosch was acquitted and Luis Posada Carriles escaped prison for the US. Tensions resurfaced when Cubans sought refuge in Venezuela's Havana embassy in 1980.

In 1992, Castro initially denounced the 1992 Venezuelan coup d'état attempts performed by Hugo Chávez. However, after Chávez was pardoned in 1994, Castro invited him to Havana seeking more international assistance following the collapse of the Soviet Union which damaged Cuba's economy.

== 1999–2026 ==
=== Chávez and Castro ===
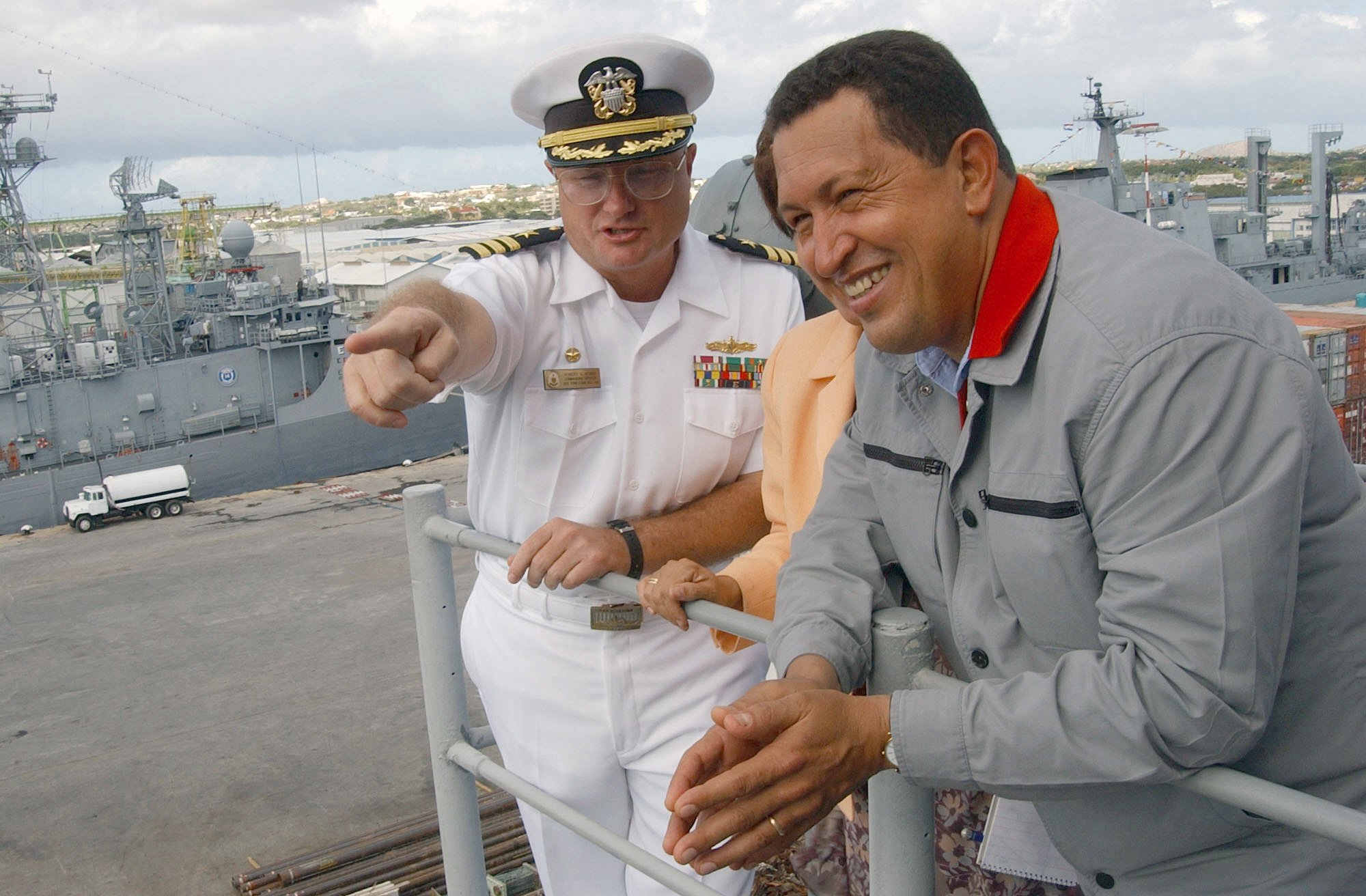
Chávez visiting the USS Yorktown, a US Navy ship docked at Curaçao in the Netherlands Antilles, in 2002

British journalist and historian Richard Gott pointed that Hugo Chávez and Fidel Castro share several similarities. Castro became a national hero in Cuba after his failed Moncada Barracks attacks on July 26, 1953, and Chávez led the unsuccessful February 1992 Venezuelan coup d'état attempt. Castro spent several years in prison and then led a two-year-long guerrilla war before assuming power in 1959 and Chávez also came to power after spending a period in prison and established his own political movement.

In 1999, Chávez visited Havana and stated at the University of Havana (UH), "Venezuela is traveling towards the same sea as the Cuban people, a sea of happiness and of real social justice and peace". He called Castro "brother" and said:

Here we are, as alert as ever, Fidel and Hugo, fighting with dignity and courage to defend the interests of our people, and to bring alive the idea of Bolívar and Martí. In the name of Cuba and Venezuela, I appeal for the unity of our two peoples, and of the revolutions that we both lead. Bolívar and Martí, one country united!

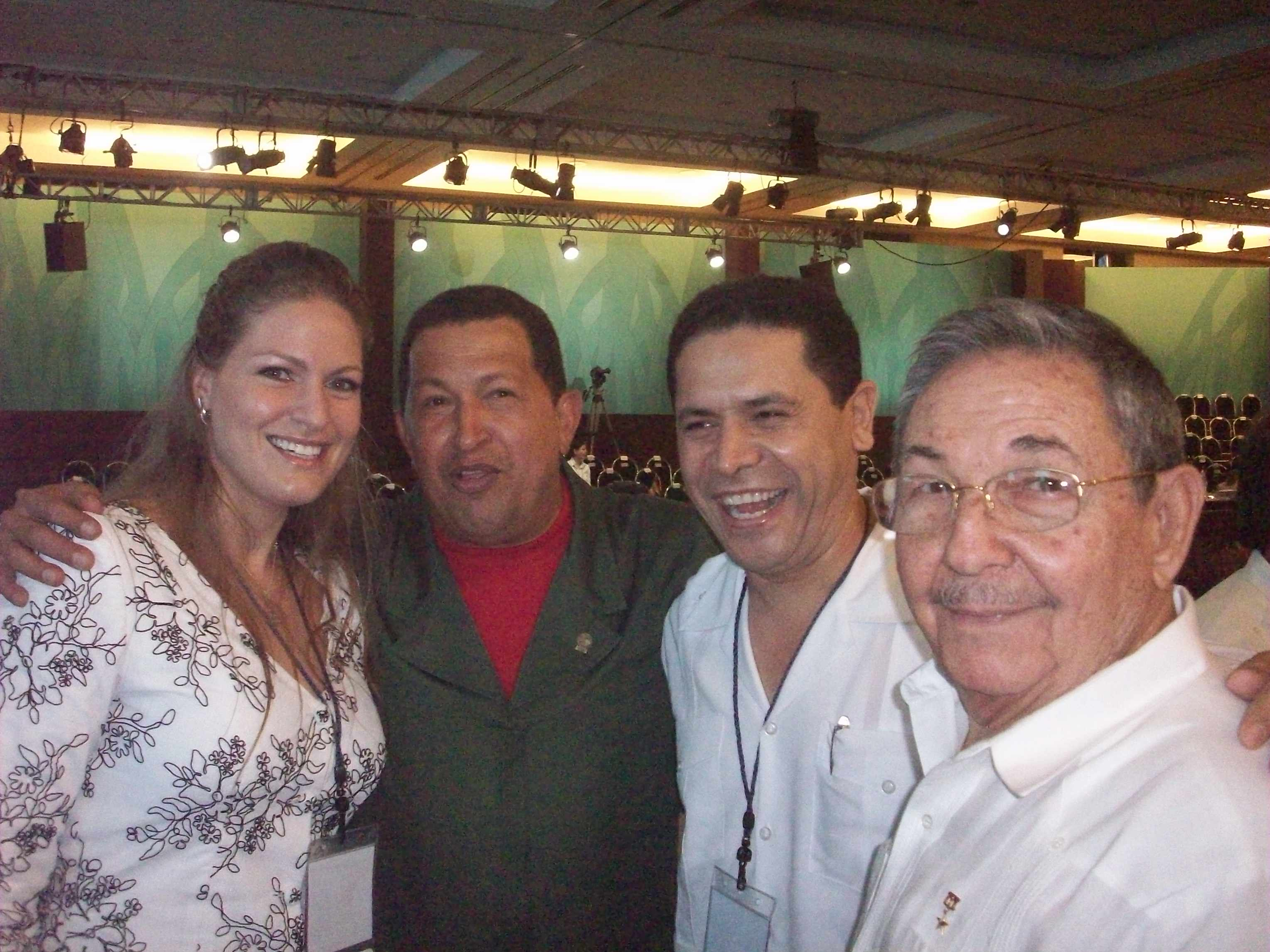
Hugo Chávez and Raúl Castro in 2010

Chávez viewed Cuba as a key international partner due to its internationalist history including its military interventions in southern Africa, and its medical internationalism such as the assistance it had provided to Venezuela following the Vargas landslides. In Chávez's view, partnership with Cuba would help raise the profile of Chávez's anti-imperialist political project. In October 2000, Venezuela and Cuba formalized this relationship and started to integrate their respective economies through a Comprehensive Cooperation Agreement. This partnership with Cuba led to the development of the Bolivarian Alternative for the Peoples of Our Americas (ALBA), a regional free trade organization.

Following the 2002 Venezuelan coup d'état attempt, Chávez grew closer to Cuba in order to gain their assistance so he could hold on to power. Chávez could no longer trust his own personnel in his "situation room" and brought in the G2, Cuban intelligence. One Chávez aide stated that "I saw their strategy: seal Chávez off from public, manipulate him, nourish his insecurity, find evidence of assassination plots, of betrayals. Make him paranoid." Venezuela would trade tens of thousands of barrels of oil for military personnel and intelligence from Cuba while Chávez also received assistance with social programs in order to maintain voter loyalty.

In 2005, Chávez said that the cooperation between Cuba and Venezuela is an example of what socialism can and should do. While jointly appearing with Castro on a six-hour TV phone-in programme in August 2005, Chávez said he did not see Cuba as a dictatorship; he said "It's a revolutionary democracy". Chávez said the democracy promoted by George W. Bush is "a false democracy of the elite" and a "democracy of bombs". Chávez regarded Castro as his mentor.

In May 2008, Venezuelan Foreign Minister Nicolás Maduro, leading a delegation in Cuba to attend the 12th meeting of the Cuba-Venezuela Political Consultation Body, met Vice President of Cuba Carlos Lage Dávila at the Ministers' Council headquarters to discuss the situation in Latin America and other bilateral issues. At the opening of the meeting, Maduro said Cuban Revolution "showed us the path of the second, real political, economic, social and cultural independence 50 years ago". Describing the relations between the two countries, he said "our relation is a profound, longstanding, strategic fraternity by which we have become a single people, a single nation, as dreamed by the liberating fathers". Maduro held talks with Raúl Castro also and discussed issues related to bilateral relations.

=== Post-Chávez relations ===
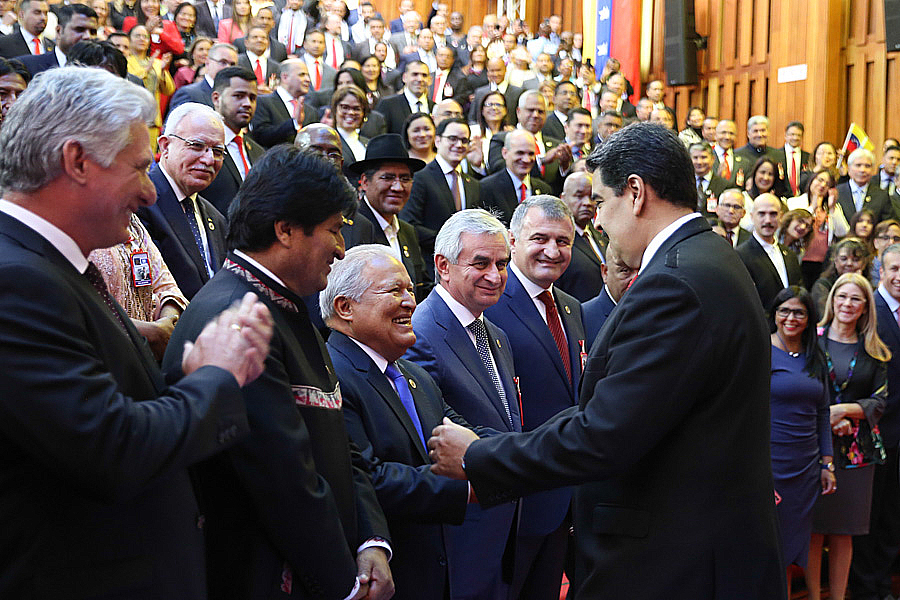
Cuban President Miguel Díaz-Canel at Maduro's second inauguration on 10 January 2019

Hugo Chávez died in March 2013. A special presidential election was held in April, which was won by Chávez's Vice President, Nicolás Maduro.

Following Chávez's death, Castro sought a new benefactor after Venezuela's economy was in ruin and the oil trade between the two countries were beginning to slow. With Cuba needing new support, relations between the United States and Cuba began to be reestablished in 2014 during United States–Cuban Thaw.

Maduro was re-elected for a second term in May 2018, but the result was denounced as fraudulent by most neighboring countries, the European Union, Canada and the United States. Cuba, however, recognized the elections and congratulated Maduro.

In January 2019, the majority opposition National Assembly declared that Maduro's reelection was invalid and declared its president, Juan Guaidó, to be acting president of Venezuela. The United States, Canada, and most of Western Europe and Latin America (including Brazil, Colombia, Argentina) recognized Guaidó as interim president. Cuba, however, continued to support Maduro.

In April 2019, the opposition-majority National Assembly voted and approved to cut Venezuela's oil supply to Cuba, aiming to save at least US$2,585,000 daily, according to its President Juan Guaidó.

In June 2021, during the Covid-19 pandemic, Venezuelan vice president Delcy Rodríguez announced that the country had obtained its first load of Abdala, which is a Cuban made Covid-19 vaccine with Cuban president, Miguel Díaz-Canel, claiming that 12 million doses would coming in total. This made Venezuela the first country to receive them although the success of the vaccine is not proven.

Venezuelan president Nicolás Maduro is said to trust the Cubans more than his fellow Venezuelans, meaning Maduro's protection is in the hands of the Cuban security and intelligence services.

Cuba supported Maduro's claim of victory in the contested 2024 Venezuelan presidential election.

On 3 January 2026, the United States carried out several strikes in Venezuela and captured President Nicolas Maduro and his wife Cilia Flores. 32 Cuban bodyguards and some Venezuelans were killed in the operation. Cuban President Miguel Diaz-Canel denounced the attack, calling it "state terrorism". According to Reuters, anonymous Venezuelan officials indicated that some Cuban security forces and medical doctors in Venezuela were returning to Cuba, diminishing their role in Venezuelan politics. According to some officials, Cubans were being removed from their posts in Venezuela's General Directorate of Military Counterintelligence (DGCIM). Venezuela's interim president Delcy Rodriguez and Cuban Foreign Minister, Bruno Rodriguez Padilla attended the ceremony "Promotions and Decorations for Heroes and Martyrs", honouring Venezuelan and Cuban military and security personnel who died during a U.S. operation to capture Venezuela's President Nicolas Maduro.

== Economic ties ==
On December 14, 2004, Chávez and Castro signed a joint declaration which said that neoliberalism acts as "a mechanism to increase dependence and foreign domination". The two leaders described the US-supported Free Trade Area of the Americas (FTAA) as an "expression of a hunger to dominate the region" and said that the free trade area will result in increase in poverty and subordination in Latin America. According to the joint declaration, economic integration is necessary for the Latin American nations to earn a respected position in the world economy, but this integration will be based on mutual cooperation.

On January 25, 2007, Chávez and Cuba's Vice President Carlos Lage signed an agreement to develop a range of production projects which involved nickel, electricity and rice. This deal also included construction of an underwater fiber optics cable to bypass a US embargo which was aimed to be built within 2009. From 2008 to 2011, Hugo Chávez's government in Venezuela gave Cuba $18 billion in loans, investments and grants.

During the crisis in Bolivarian Venezuela, trade between the two countries slowed. Venezuela's exports to Cuba dropped from $5.1 billion in 2014 to $1.6 billion in 2016, while Cuban exports to Venezuela declined from $2 billion to $642,000 in the same period.

Merchandise trade with Venezuela fell to $2.2 billion in 2016, compared with $4.2 billion the year before and $7.3 billion in 2014, the Cuban National Statistics Office reported on its website.

=== Oil ===
In October 2000, Chávez and Castro signed the Convenio Integral de Cooperación under which Venezuela will send 53,000-barrel (8,400 m^{3}) per day of oil to Cuba and will receive technical support in the fields of education, health care, sports, science and technology. In February 2005, Venezuela increased its discounted oil shipments to Cuba to 90,000-barrel (14,000 m^{3}) per day which represents less than 3.5% of Venezuela's total oil production. But for Cuba, 90,000 bbl/d (14,000 m^{3}/d) is of high value. Much of this oil obtained from Venezuela is subsidized. According to 2005 estimates, Venezuela is providing Cuba nearly 20,000 bbl/d (3,200 m^{3}/d) to 26,000 bbl/d (4,100 m^{3}/d) of oil free of cost, for a total "gift" of $6–8 billion until 2020. Cuba is reportedly re-exporting 40,000 to 50,000 bbl/d (7,900 m^{3}/d) of oil because Cuba produces 80,000 bbl/d (13,000 m^{3}/d) oil domestically and total oil consumption in Cuba is 120,000 bbl/d (19,000 m^{3}/d).

Oil from Venezuela was an important factor in the success of Cuba's Energy Revolution campaign, which began in 2005, and sought to decarbonize Cuba's economy and decentralize its electricity infrastructure. The availability of Venezuelan oil at non-market prices through Petrocaribe meant that Cuba could still increase its energy use in absolute terms during the Energy Revolution.

In 2007, the two countries established a joint venture to revamp the Cienfuegos oil refinery in Cuba. Venezuela and Cuba were set to invest approximately $800m to $1bn in primary stage into the programme. According to this scheme, 51% share of the plant will be held by Cuba and 49% by Petróleos de Venezuela S.A. (PDVSA), the Venezuelan state-owned petroleum company. In December 2007, Chávez attended the Petrocaribe summit in Havana along with several prime ministers and presidents from around the Caribbean and Central America.

In 2019, the opposition controlled National Assembly voted and approved to cut Venezuela's oil supply to Cuba, saving at least $2,585,000 daily, according to its Speaker Juan Guaidó.

After the United States captured President Maduro in January 2026, Venezuela stopped sending oil to Cuba.

=== Health care ===
In return for Venezuelan oil, Cuba is sending approximately 30,000 to 50,000 technical personnel to Venezuela, including physicians, sport coaches, teachers, and arts instructors who offer social services, often in poverty-stricken regions. Under the programme Convenio de Atención a Pacientes implemented in 2000, Venezuela send patients and their relatives for medical treatment in Cuba where the Government of Venezuela pays the transportation costs, and Cuba bears all other expenses.

In April 2005, the presidents Chávez and Castro signed an agreement to increase the number of healthcare workers in Venezuela in exchange for oil shipments. As part of the agreement, Cuba would help Venezuela train 30,000 "comprehensive community doctors" to staff Venezuela's "Barrio Adentro" (Inside the Barrio) public health program which included establishment of 1,000 free medical centers and surgical treatment for approximately 100,000 Venezuelans in Cuba. With Cuban assistance, Barrio Adentro network has four stages, delivering free healthcare from 7,000 local community clinics up to hospital level. The program is measured to have administered over 500 million consultations and saved over 1.4 million lives since its founding. Meanwhile, the oil shipment to Cuba is increased to 90,000 barrels (14,000 m^{3}) per day. In 2005 alone, 50,000 Venezuelans went to Cuba for free eye treatment.

In conjunction with other government social programs, Barrio Adentro has been an important factor in the improvement of health indicators over the previous decade. This was highlighted in a study by the Council for Social and Economic Research which found that among other indicators, between 2003 – 2006 alone infant mortality fell in Venezuela from 18.5 per 1000 births to 14.2 per 1000 births.

=== Research ===
The Venezuelan Institute for Scientific Research and Cuban scientists collaborated in a research project for analyzing "stress" in rice production caused by drought or saline soils. Research findings on this were presented in the 4th International Encounter on Rice held in Havana in 2008. One of the several objectives of this joint scientific project is to understand the effectiveness of the hormones.

== Military ties ==
Close ties with Cuba are helping Caracas in its goal to transform the military of Venezuela; these began in 2004. As part of an effort to remove US influence from the country, the Army of Venezuela is trying to replace NATO-compliant Belgian rifles with the AK-103. The Military of Cuba has over 40 years experience handling Soviet and Russian military equipment, and in training combatants in guerrilla warfare and in counterinsurgency operations. Interim President Delcy Rodriguez's government faces intense pressure from Washington to unwind Latin America’s most consequential leftist alliance, has entrusted her protection to Venezuelan bodyguards unlike deposed president Nicolas Maduro and his predecessor, the late president Hugo Chavez, who both relied on elite Cuban forces.

== Views from abroad ==
American journalist and political scientist Michael Radu in his book Dilemmas of Democracy & Dictatorship expressed negative view over this bilateral relations stating "most of Chávez' policies are distinctly anti-democratic, often unconstitutional, and usually anti-American and pro-Castro". Another American, Frank Gaffney, founder of the Center for Security Policy organization, expressed similar negative view in the book War Footing where he writes, "Chávez represents what Castro always wanted to be: the leader of a revolution that extends well beyond his own territory. Castro has helped Chávez learn how to undermine and destabilize liberal democracies throughout the region by using Castro's own tested methods of political warfare. ... Castro has decades of experience; Chávez has money and power. Theirs is a partnership with Chávez in charge".

The Federal government of the United States maintains the view that both Chávez and Castro were trying to undermine democracy in the Caribbean and portrays Chávez as a security threat. Critics say Chávez is using petroleum sales under preferential terms to increase his political influence in the Caribbean. He has been criticized for making friendly relations with Cuba, which is a long-time opponent of the United States. In January 2005, the United States Secretary of State Condoleezza Rice called Cuba "outpost of tyranny" and Chávez a "negative force" in Latin America. Chávez was criticized by opponents on the basis that he was trying to establish a Cuban-style authoritarian government.

But the United States' view on this issue has been criticized. Irum Abbasi, researcher of The Institute of Strategic Studies in Islamabad writes, "To the US, the real issue has never been human rights but the success of its client regimes in the region, which is substantiated by the fact that it tends to overlook those human rights abuses that are perpetrated by pro-US regimes". She stated that the United States has criticized Cuba and Venezuela for human rights abuses, but often tolerated and even supported regimes which violated human rights, but were anti-communist. Historian Jane Franklin in an article titled Who's Afraid Of Venezuela-Cuba Alliance? gave the example that in 1952 the United States supported a coup which installed Fulgencio Batista as dictator of Cuba and writes "U.S. overthrows of elected governments are nothing new, as demonstrated in Brazil, Chile, the Dominican Republic, and Haiti, to name a few". Franklin pointed that Cuba is well developed in health care and was once the only nation in Latin America to offer universal free health care, and with the help of Cuba, Venezuela has been able to give free health care to many of its citizens; thus the both countries respect health care as a basic human right. Regarding Rice's remark, she stated that the Bush administration and the media have increased their attack against Chávez and Castro.

Richard Gott in his book Hugo Chávez and the Bolivarian Revolution described the United States as "the chief imperial power in the region and the champion of the neo-liberal philosophy" and said that Chávez and Castro have directed their rhetoric against this US policy. British-Pakistani historian, filmmaker and political campaigner Tariq Ali in a letter to The Guardian wrote, "The government of the US has no moral authority to elect itself as the judge over human rights in Cuba, where there has not been a single case of disappearance, torture or extra-judicial execution since 1959, and where despite the economic blockade, there are levels of health, education and culture that are internationally recognised". Abbasi noted that recent election results in several Latin American countries indicate a drift towards left-wing politics which she analyzes a result of public anger over neoliberalism.
