= Morales =

Morales is a Spanish surname. Notable people with the surname include:

- Adela Robles Morales (born 1965), Mexican politician
- Alfonso Morales (journalist) (1949–2020), Mexican sports journalist
- Alfredo Morales (born 1990), American footballer
- Alvaro Morales (disambiguation), several people
- Amado Morales (born 1947), Puerto Rican javelin thrower
- Bartolomé Morales (1737–?), Spanish officer and Florida colonial official
- Campo Elías Delgado Morales (1934–1986), Colombian spree killer
- Carlos Adrián Morales, Mexican football (soccer) player
- Carlos Luis Morales, Ecuadorian football (soccer) goalkeeper
- Carlos Morales (American soccer) (born 1982), Puerto Rican football (soccer) player
- Carlos Morales Santos, Paraguayan football (soccer) player
- Carlos Morales Troncoso (1940–2014), Dominican politician, former foreign minister
- Christina Morales, American politician
- Cristina Morales (born 1993), Spanish kickboxer
- Cristóbal de Morales (c. 1500–1553), Spanish composer
- Dan Morales (born 1956), American politician from Texas
- Daniel Morales (footballer) (born 1975), Brazilian footballer
- Daniel Morales (swimmer) (born 1977), Spanish former swimmer
- David Morales (musician) (born 1961), New York-based American DJ and music producer
- David Sánchez Morales (1925–1978), American CIA operative
- Dianne Morales (born 1967), American non-profit executive and political candidate
- Dr. Ramón Villeda Morales (1908–1971), President of Honduras
- Eduardo Morales Miranda, Chilean physician and founder of Universidad Austral de Chile
- Enrique Martín Morales, known as Ricky Martin, Grammy Award winning Puerto Rican pop singer
- Erik Morales (born 1976), Mexican professional boxer
- Esai Morales (born 1962), Puerto Rican actor
- Esther Morales (1949–2020), Bolivian grocer, businessperson, and public figure
- Evo Morales (born 1959), former president of Bolivia
- Fabio de Jesús Morales Grisales (1934–2025), Colombian Roman Catholic bishop
- Fernando Morales (volleyball) (born 1982), Puerto Rican volleyball player
- Florencio Morales Ramos (1915–1989), Puerto Rican singer, trovador and composer
- Francisco Morales (disambiguation), several people
- Franco Morales (born 1992), Chilean basketball player
- Frank Morales (born 1949), New York City-based American priest and journalist
- Franklin E. Morales (1884–1962), American diplomat
- Franklin Morales (born 1986), Venezuelan baseball player
- Guillem Morales (born 1973), Spanish filmmaker
- Jacobo Morales (born 1934), Puerto Rican actor
- Javier Morales (born 1980), Argentine football (soccer) player
- Jimmy Morales (born 1969), President of Guatemala (2016–2020)
- José Luis Morales (born 1973), Spanish football player
- José Luis Morales (born 1987), Spanish football player
- José Morales (designated hitter) (born 1944), American baseball player
- Juan Bautista Morales (c. 1597–1664), Spanish Dominican missionary
- Kendrys Morales (born 1983), Cuban baseball player
- Leonardo Morales (Scouting), Costa Rican Scout leader
- Luis Morales (disambiguation), several people
- Makisig Morales (born 1996), Filipino former actor
- Manolo Rivera Morales (1934–1996), Puerto Rican sportscaster
- Manuel Morales (basketball) (born 1987), Peruvian basketball player
- Marco Morales (American football), American football player
- María Antonia Morales (1931–2024), Chilean judge and lawyer
- Maricel "Marang" Morales, Filipino politician, actress, beauty queen and singer
- Mario Morales (born 1960), Puerto Rican basketball player
- Mark Morales (AKA Prince Markie Dee) (1968–2021), American dance music producer
- Memo Morales (1937–2017), Venezuelan singer
- Mikoy Morales (born 1993), Filipino actor
- Natalie Morales (actress), American actress
- Natalie Morales (journalist), American journalist for NBC
- Pablo Morales (born 1962) American Olympic swimmer, Gold and Silver medalist
- Pablo Morales Pérez (1905–1969), Venezuelan baseball executive and promoter
- Pedro Morales (1942–2019), Puerto Rican professional wrestler
- Pedro Morales Flores (born 1985), Chilean football player
- Rags Morales, American comic book artist
- Ramón Morales (born 1975), Mexican professional footballer
- Rebecca Jo Morales (born 1962), American artist
- Ricardo Arjona Morales, Guatemalan song writer, music producer, poet, singer
- Ricardo Morales (disambiguation), several people
- Rodolfo Morales (1925–2001), Mexican artist
- Sylvestro "Pedro" Morales (18??–1???), Mexican bandit
- Valeria Morales, Colombian model
- Vicky Morales (born 1969), Filipino broadcast journalist and television presenter
- Vina Morales (born 1975 as Sharon Garcia Magdayao), Filipino singer and actress
- Virgilio Morales Díaz, Cuban Boy Scout leader
- William Morales (born 1950), Puerto Rican terrorist.

== de Morales ==
- Andrés de Morales (fl. 16th cent.), Spanish cartographer
- Cristóbal de Morales (c. 1500–1553), Spanish composer
- Luis de Morales (c. 1510–1586), Spanish painter

== y Morales ==
- Gerardo Machado y Morales (1871–1939), Cuban politician

== Fictional characters ==
- Charlotte Morales, Spider-Girl, in the Spider-Gwen comic book series
- Diana Morales, character in the musical A Chorus Line
- Enrique Morales, in the HBO series Oz
- Jim Moralés, in Code Lyoko (voiced by David Gasman)
- Lt. Morales, the combat medic, a playable character in the video game Heroes of the Storm
- Miles Morales, Spider-Man in the Ultimate Comics: Spider-Man comic book series
- Morales, in the television series The Walking Dead
- Ramón Morales, in the 2019 film Scary Stories to Tell in the Dark
