= Morales (disambiguation) =

Morales is a Spanish surname.

Morales may also refer to:

- Morales, Bolívar, located in the Bolívar Department of Colombia
- Morales, Cauca, located in the Cauca Department of Colombia
- Morales, Guatemala, a municipality in the Izabal department of Guatemala
- Morales District, district of the San Martin Province, Peru
- Morales Peak, mountain of Antarctica
- Morales-Sanchez, Texas, a census-designated place (CDP) in Zapata County, Texas, United States
- Morales (The Walking Dead), a fictional character from the television series The Walking Dead

== See also ==
- Morales de Toro, municipality in Zamora, Castile and León, Spain
