= Order of Francisco de Miranda =

Order of Venezuela

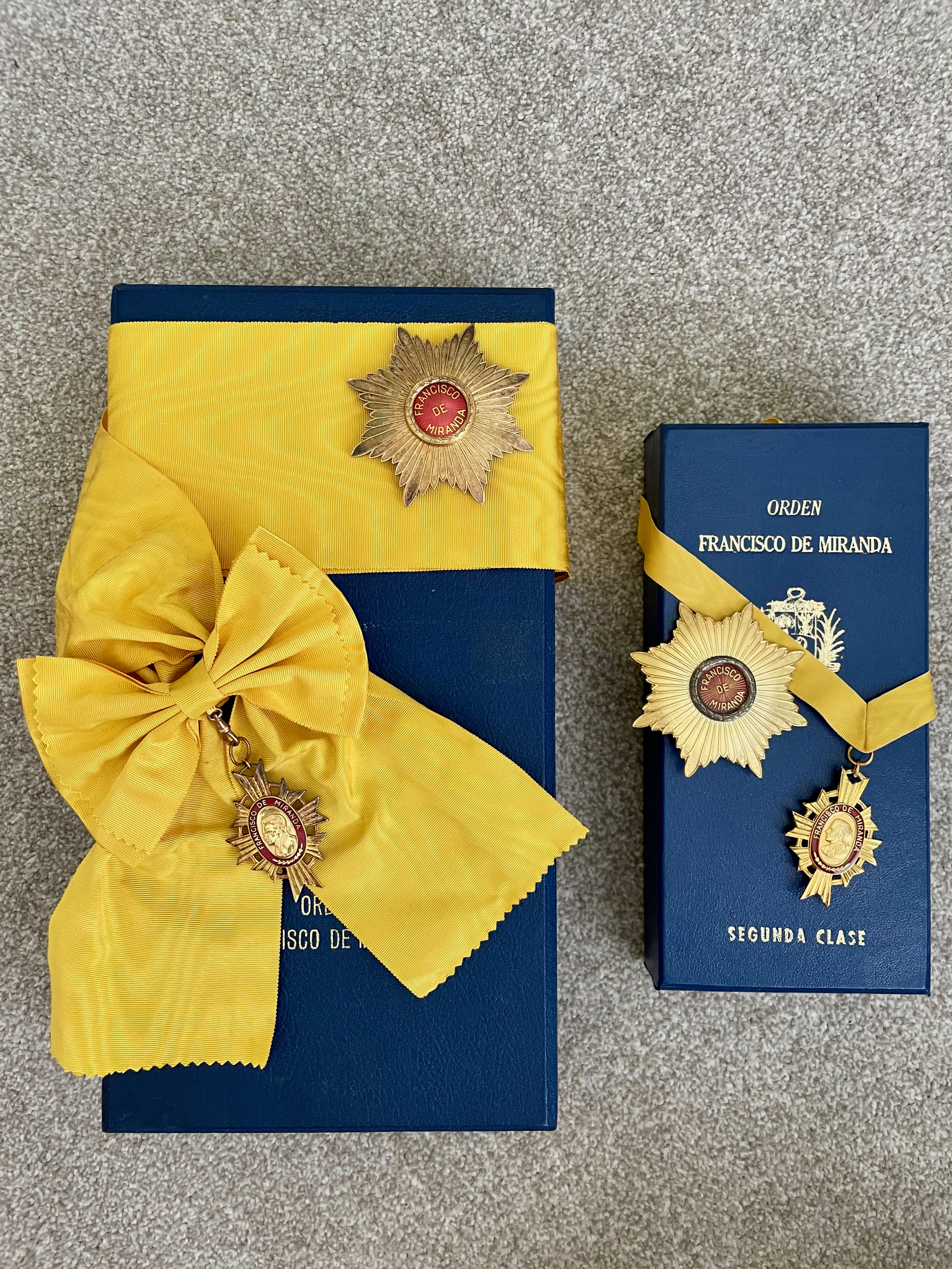

Awarded by the Bolivarian Republic of Venezuela
- Grades: Grand Cross; Commander; Knight

Precedence
- Next (higher): Order of the Liberator
- Next (lower): Order of Merit in Work
- Ribbon bars of the Order of Francisco de Miranda (Knight; Commander; Grand Cross)

The Order of Francisco de Miranda (Orden Francisco de Miranda) is conferred by the Bolivarian Republic of Venezuela in memory of Francisco de Miranda (1754–1816). This national honor and decoration was created to recognize Venezuelan citizens and foreigners who have contributed to the sciences, to the progress of the country, to the humanities or who have exemplified outstanding merits. There are several variations in this Order. Originally a medal established in 1934; it was reestablished as an Order on 28 July 1939.

== History ==
This honor, conferred by the President of Venezuela, was established in the 1930s. Subsequent legislation modifying the Order, the former Law on the Condecoration of the Francisco de Miranda Order was enacted in July 1943. More recently, the law was revised further in 2006, establishing the different levels or rankings within the Order and also identifying potential categories of recipients.

=== Description ===
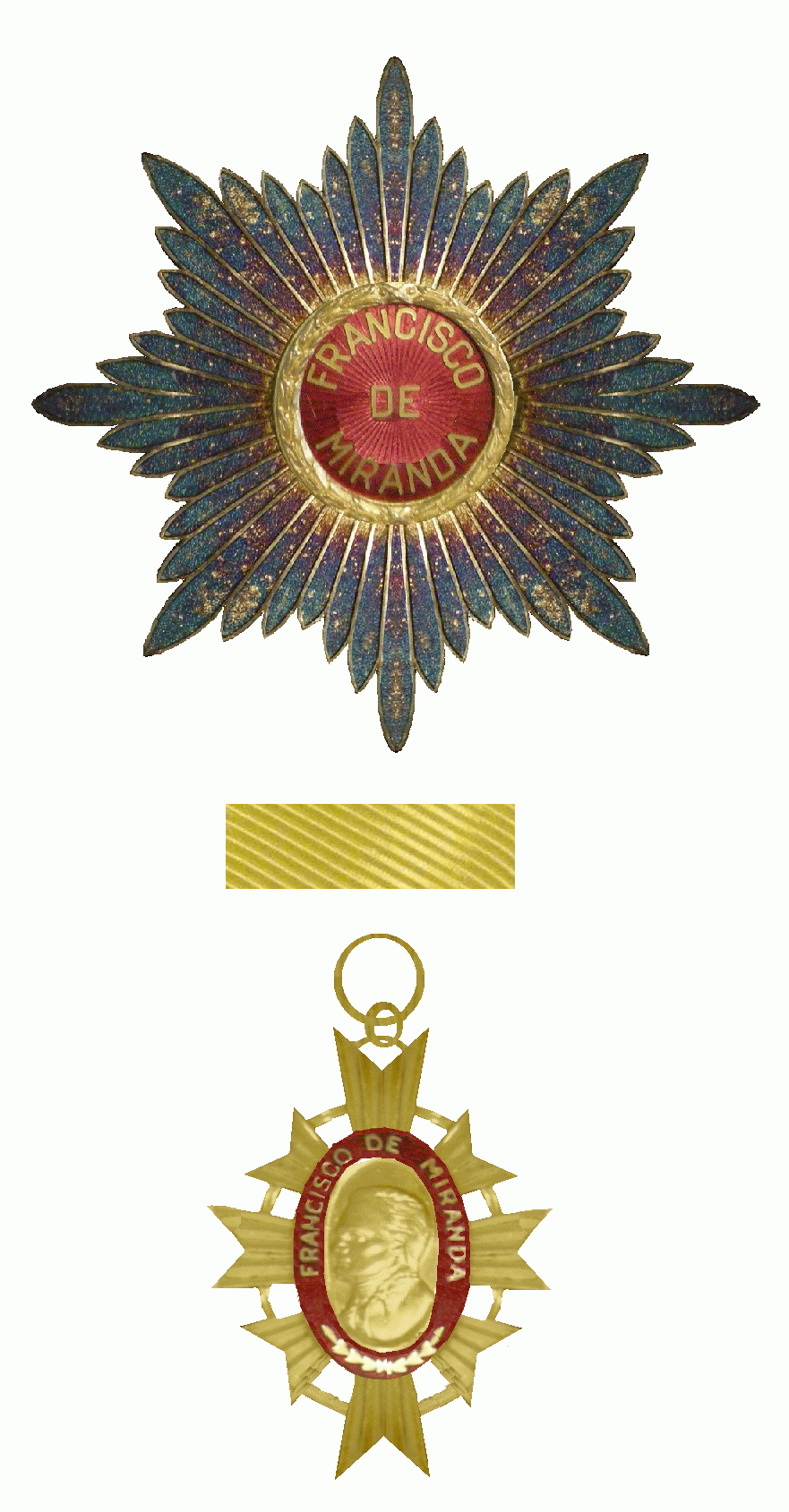
Order of Francisco de Miranda

The gold-colored neck order badge features an oblong maroon enamel center showing the left-facing profile of Francisco de Miranda. The Venezuelan patriot's name is emblazoned across the upper quadrants of a band which encompasses this central image. Eight sunburst rays extend from this enameled focal point; and these rays are supported by a single encircling nimbus band of gold. The obverse features an embossed image of the coat of arms of the República Bolivariana de Venezuela. The device measures approximately 3-1/4 inches in diameter; and it is designed to hang from a bright yellow ribbon which is 1-3/8 inches wide, 18 inches in length.

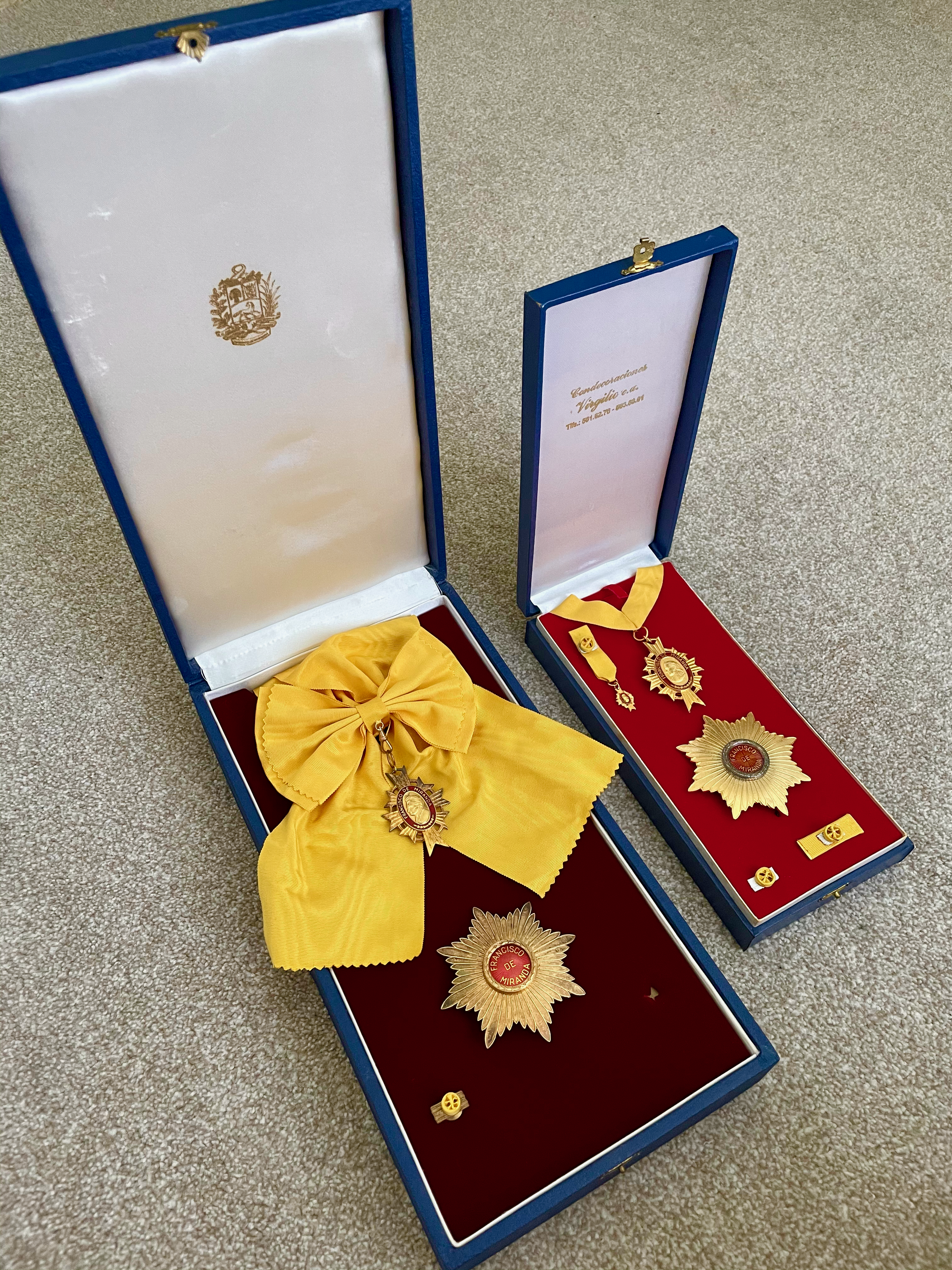
Order of Francisco de Miranda Grand Cross and Grand Officer sets

The official medal contractor for the Venezuelan government was N. S. Meyer of New York City.

== Recipients ==
Recipients
Year awarded	Name
2020	Telesur
1958	Hector Abdelnour
2007	Jose Antonio Abreu
2005	Maria Barroso
2013	Cesar Baena
2007	Joseph S. Blatter
1965	George Elbert Brown
1996	Josef Leopold Burg
	Alfredo Chiradia
2009	Carlos D. Cienfuegos
1962	Horrester Contreras
1994	Rafael del Valle Díaz Requena
	Mito Croes
1998	Carel P. de Haseth
2003	Elbano Gil Hernandez
2005	Daisaku Ikeda
	Alberto João Jardim
1982	Nagib El Zakhem Kouzamy
	Harry Männil
	Eduardo Mendoza Goiticoa
	Abdolreza Mesri
	Manuel Ochoa Acuña
1989	Tai Kim Raymundo "Atan" Lee
1993	Martín Marciales Moncada
1993	Eduardo Ramírez Villamizar
1968	Willard Rockwell
1979	Mstislav Rostropovich
1996	Satyadeow Sawh
1968	Monroe Edward Spaght
1993	Jose Carta T
1960	Abdullah Tariki
	Hamad bin Khalifa Al Thani
1999	Shoichiro Toyoda
1978	Dr. Juan Bernardo Vásconez
1989	Lech Wałęsa
1972	Henri Wassenbergh
2021	Sam Nujoma
