= Eduardo Mendoza Goiticoa =

Venezuelan agricultural engineer

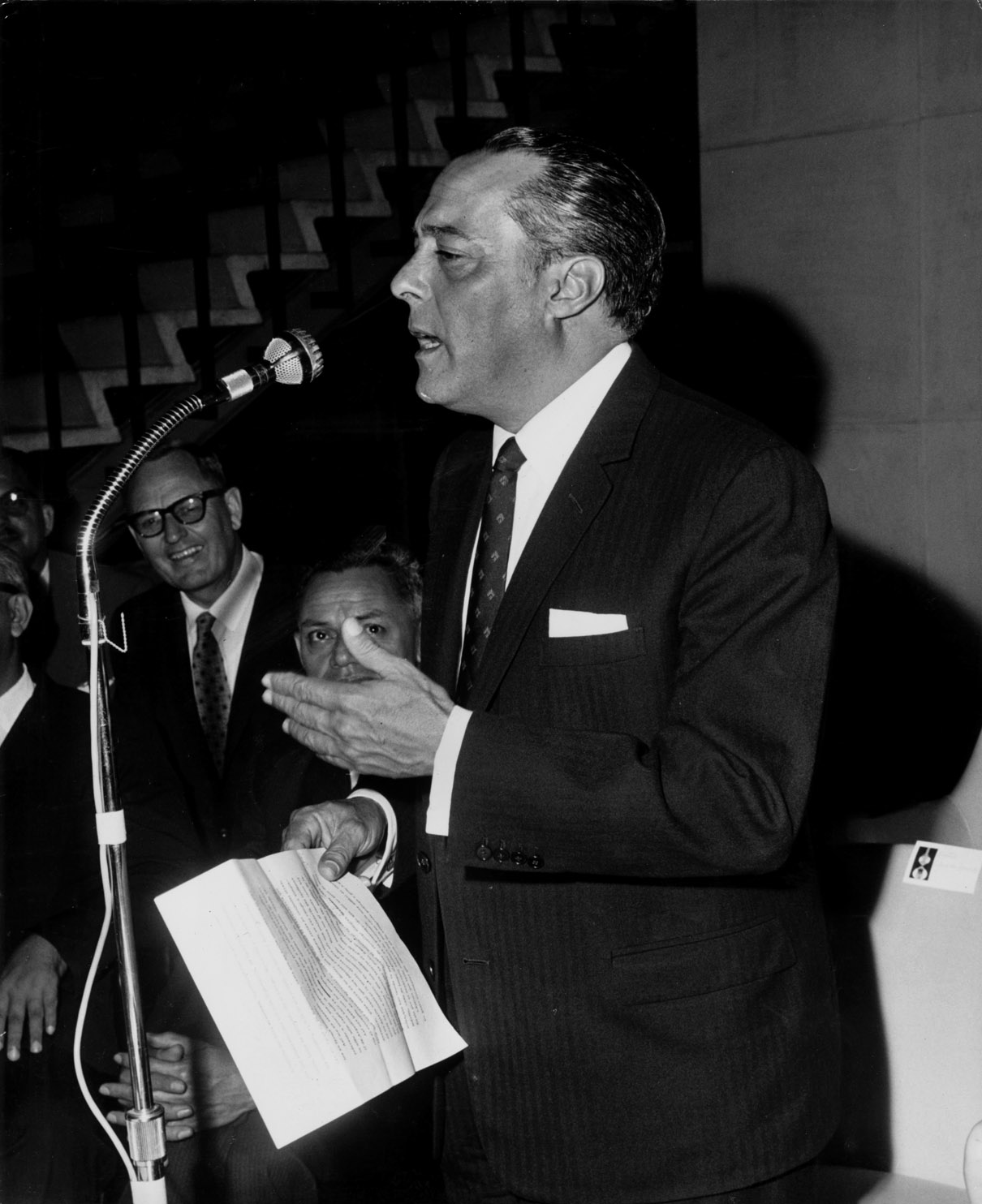

Venezuelan Minister of Agriculture
- In office 1945–1947
- President: Rómulo Betancourt

Personal details
- Born: Eduardo Hurtado de Mendoza y Goiticoa; 9 June 1917 Caracas, Venezuela
- Died: 25 August 2009 (aged 92) Caracas, Venezuela
- Spouse: Hilda Coburn
- Children: 2
- Parent(s): Eugenio Mendoza; Luisa Goiticoa
- Education: National University of La Plata

Eduardo Mendoza Goiticoa (9 June 1917 – 25 August 2009) was a Venezuelan scientific researcher and agricultural engineer. He served the government of Rómulo Betancourt, becoming the youngest cabinet minister in Venezuelan history at the age of 28. His appointment was problematic due to his young age and required a constitutional amendment. Betancourt had insisted on the appointment and vastly expanded the portfolio of the Secretary of Agriculture to include all immigration matters.

== Family ==
Mendoza was married to Hilda Coburn Velutini (died 2006) and had two daughters.

== Biography ==
Eduardo Mendoza obtained a degree in agricultural engineering from Argentina's National University of La Plata in 1941. Mendoza returned to Venezuela and settled on a family farm in Valles del Tuy.

=== Government service ===
On the eve of 18 October 1945, he was awakened at home by a commission from the Revolutionary Governmental Junta offering him the position of Minister of Agriculture in the new government of Rómulo Betancourt deposing General Isaias Medina Angarita from power for refusing to grant Venezuelans universal suffrage.

Mendoza was sworn in while gunfights continued on the streets. Betancourt, a socialist-democratic leader who had previously been a staunch communist, appointed Mendoza on the basis of his scientific research and academic credentials.

Mendoza was the youngest cabinet minister in Venezuelan history. This leftist government, resulting from a revolution, was the first to declare universal suffrage in Venezuela.

=== Immigration law and war refugees ===
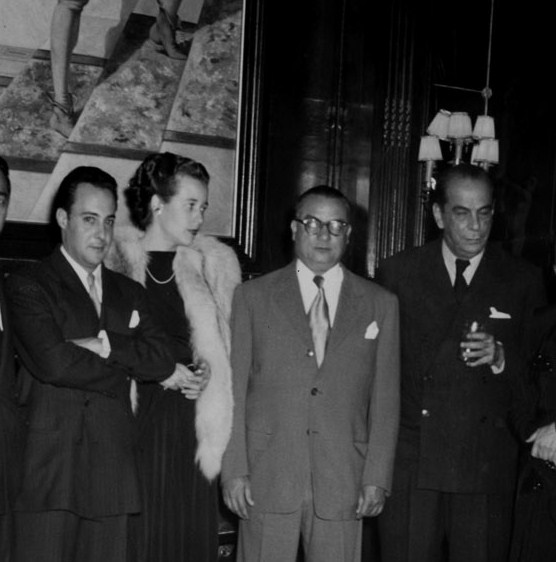
Eduardo Mendoza and his wife with president Rómulo Gallegos and future Venezuelan president Rómulo Betancourt.

As Secretary of Agriculture for Betancourt's government, Mendoza headed the Venezuelan Institute for Immigration and embraced the creation of the International Refugee Organization in 1946 (this body was later replaced by the Office of the United Nations High Commissioner for Refugees). Mendoza succeeded, despite fierce opposition within the cabinet, in ensuring that Venezuela would aid European refugees and displaced persons who could not or would not return to their homes after World War II and chose to emigrate to Venezuela. He assumed responsibility for the legal protection and resettlement of tens of thousands of refugees arriving in Venezuela. International Refugee Organization officials consider Mendoza to have directed the most successful refugee program in the post-war period. Immigration reached a peak while he was minister and would later decline with a new government.

=== Resignation ===
Mendoza resigned from the Betancourt government in 1947 over the importation of frozen beef from Argentina. Mendoza protested that the beef would permit hoof and mouth disease into the country. He was overruled by President Betancourt and the meat was unloaded at a Venezuelan port. Mendoza tendered his resignation in protest. The resignation was a public disaster for Betancourt.

By February 1950, an outbreak of hoof and mouth plagued the country's livestock. Venezuela has not yet successfully dealt with hoof and mouth disease.

Mendoza and Betancourt remained friends and the latter invited him to form part of his second term; Mendoza declined. The facts and subject of Mendoza's resignation have been widely studied and discussed in Venezuelan academic and journalistic circles as an example of principle. Mendoza was compared by Venezuelan president Ramón José Velásquez to the historic politician from the Roman Republic Cato.

=== Underground activism during dictatorship ===
In the 1950s, during the military dictatorship of Marcos Pérez Jiménez, Mendoza played a role as part of the underground resistance movement. Specifically, he was part of the civilian leadership that organized the general strike that led to the downfall of the dictator and the restoration of Venezuelan democracy.

=== Other works ===
After government service Mendoza worked in a variety of agricultural and conservation concerns. With his brother, Eugenio, he founded Protinal, Venezuela's largest animal feed company.

He served as a director of Caracas' central park, Parque del Este, and as a founding member of the Universidad de Oriente. He served on dozens of boards and published numerous papers. A lifelong scientific agricole researcher, he was elected to the Andean Parliament in 1998, serving until 2001.

=== Personal life ===
Mendoza was the great-grandson of the author of Venezuela's Declaration of Independence: its first President, Cristóbal Mendoza. Mendoza was the great-great-nephew of Venezuela's liberator, Simón Bolívar. Bolivar's sister, Juana, was Mendoza's great-great-grandmother.

Mendoza had seven brothers and two sisters. Eugenio Mendoza became a leading Venezuelan businessman. He did not pursue a university education, choosing instead to open a hardware store. By 1943, he had created the "Venezolana de Cementos", the largest supplier of cement in the country. Also, in the following years he conformed "Protinal", dedicated to the production of animal feed, "Venezolana de Pinturas" and "Venezolana de Pulpa y Papel". His business organization, "El Grupo Mendoza" became the largest industrial conglomerate in the 1970s encompassing everything from cement, construction, manufacturing, heavy machinery, paint, paper mills, animal feed, banking, and insurance to ownership of General Motors of Venezuela.

Mendoza's grandson by his daughter Antonieta Mendoza is Leopoldo López Mendoza, a leading opposition leader in Venezuela and former Mayor of Chacao. Mendoza's daughter Hilda was shot during a peaceful protest in 2004 and her son Thor Halvorssen Mendoza went on to found the Human Rights Foundation.

=== Awards ===
Mendoza received numerous awards and honors for his activities in the public and business sectors of Venezuela, including the Order of Merit (Orden de Merito), Order of Francisco de Miranda, Order of Cecilio Acosta, and the Orden del Libertador, which is the highest honor the Venezuelan government can bestow on any citizen in recognition for contributions to the nation.
