= Eugenio Mendoza =

Venezuelan businessman

Eugenio Mendoza Goiticoa (November 13, 1906, in Caracas – October 17, 1979, in Caracas) was a Venezuelan business tycoon who made important contributions in the modernization of the country during the 20th Century.

== Early life ==
He was the son of Eugenio Mendoza Cobeña (the grandson of Venezuela's first president, Cristóbal Mendoza) and Luisa Goiticoa (the great-granddaughter of Simón Bolívar's sister, Juana Bolívar). Despite his family's historical position he grew up in modest circumstances due to the monetary sacrifices made by his family during the war for Venezuelan independence and later the Venezuelan civil war.

Along with his brothers, Pedro, Carlos, and Eduardo Mendoza Goiticoa, he was a descendant of Simón Bolívar's sister, Juana Bolívar (Simón Bolívar had no children).

Eugenio married Luisa Rodriguez Planas in 1938, and had four children with her: Eugenio Andres, Gertrudis, Luisa Elena and Eugenio Antonio. One son, Eugenio Andres, drowned as a youngster.

== Business career ==
Eugenio Mendoza was the fourth son of seven children, he had four brothers and two sisters and was the only one who did not pursue a university education, choosing instead to go into business by starting his first company at the age of eighteen. In partnership with Moises Miranda he founded “Moisés Miranda & Cía” a firm to sell construction materials. By January 1932, he purchased Miranda’s shares, becoming the sole owner of the company today known as “Materiales Mendoza” ”. During the following years, he founded "Maquinarias Mendoza" a heavy equipment company.

He held negotiations with Vice President of the United States Henry A. Wallace, the U.S State Department and Nelson Rockefeller to commercialize construction materials in Venezuela. By that time, all construction supplies were destined to World War II.

By 1943, he had created "Venezolana de Cementos" which became the largest supplier of cement in the country. Vencemos had plants in Barquisimeto, Maracaibo, Pertigalete, Macuro and Catia La Mar. Also, in the following years he conformed "Protinal", dedicated to the production of animal feed which later became the pioneer in the development of poultry as a low cost substitute for protein; "Venezolana de Pinturas" and "Venezolana de Pulpa y Papel".

His business organization, "El Grupo Mendoza" became the largest industrial conglomerate in the 1970s encompassing everything from cement, construction, heavy machinery, paint, paper mills, animal feed, poultry, banking, and insurance to car manufacturing today known as General Motors of Venezuela.

== Public service ==
At the age of 34, Eugenio Mendoza was appointed Minister of Industry Promotion during Isaías Medina Angarita’s presidency in Venezuela (1941-1945). Arturo Uslar Pietri and Lorenzo Mendoza Fleury were also part of Medina Angarita’s cabinet; Uslar Pietri as Secretary of the Presidency and Mendoza Fleury as Philadelphia’s Consul and later as Deputy Ambassador to the United Nations. These group promoted the industrialization in Venezuela, favoring the development of the country.

In 1958 was appointed as minister of rear admiral Wolfgang Larrazabal’s cabinet following the overthrow of Marcos Pérez Jiménez on 23 January 1958.

== Philanthropy ==
He founded the "Fundación Mendoza" which led the philanthropic community of Venezuela for two decades primarily focusing on the founding of "Hospital Ortopedico Infantil" the largest children's hospital in Latin America and numerous schools.

In 1970, he founded the Universidad Metropolitana, a private university located in Caracas, which became the most important passion of his later years. It was the first Venezuelan university to offer careers in business management and finance. It remains one of the most prestigious private universities in Venezuela.

Today, their three children and grandchildren continue the business and philanthropic work of "El Grupo Mendoza" and "Fundación Mendoza".
