= Energy Revolution =

Cuban decarbonization campaign

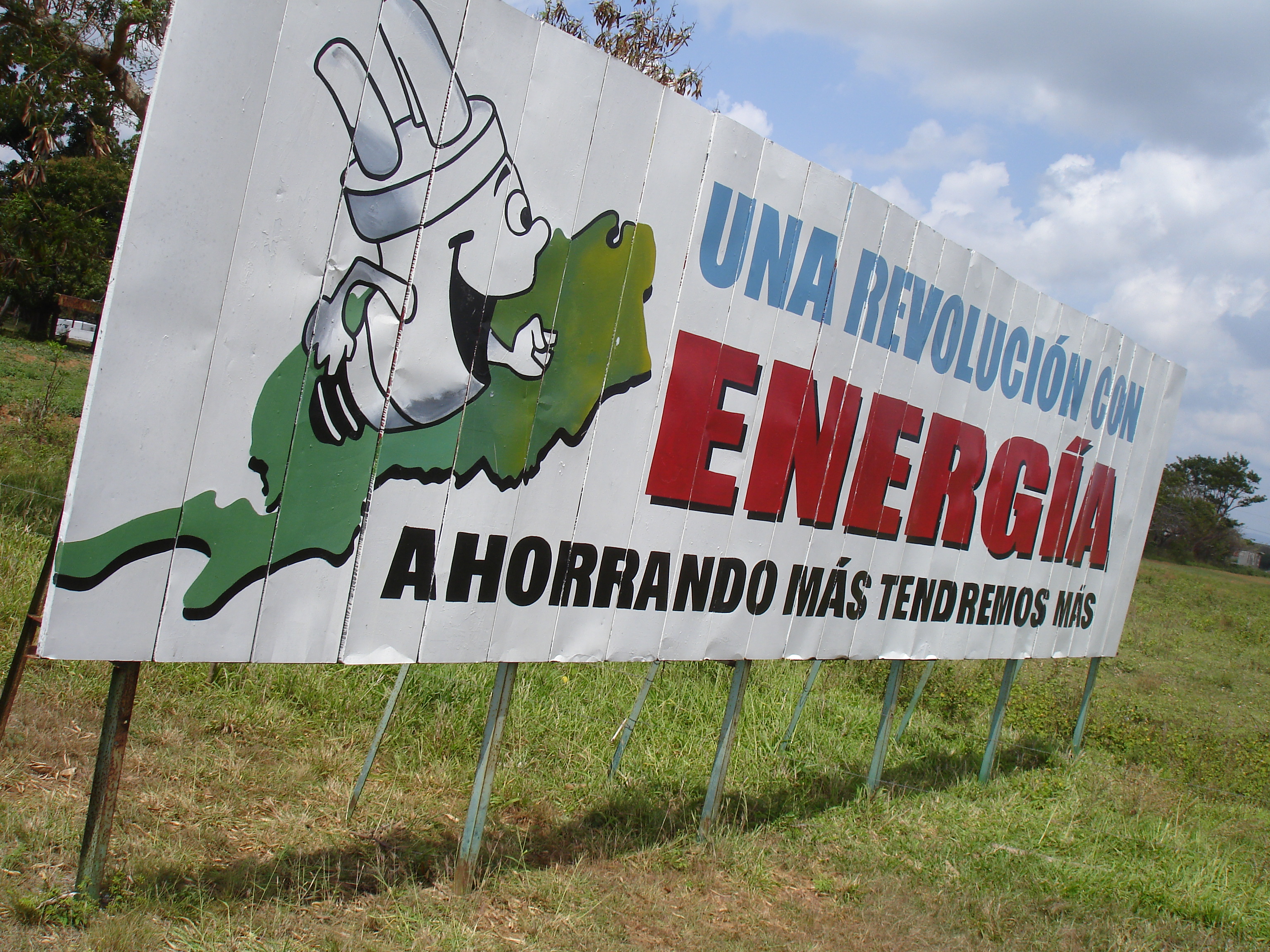
Cuban billboard during the 2005 Energy Revolution, stating in English: "A revolution with energy. Saving more we will have more."

The Energy Revolution (Spanish: revolución energética) was a campaign through which Cuba attempted to decarbonize its economy. It was announced by Fidel Castro on July 26, 2005, in the wake of massive disruption to Cuba's electric grid during Hurricane Dennis, during a speech commemorating the attack on Moncada Barracks. The campaign attempted to decentralize Cuban electricity infrastructure. It replaced durable household goods with more energy efficient models, and increased the use of renewable energy resources.

== Background ==
Cuba experienced an energy crisis between 1989 and 1994 because its crude oil imports collapsed, as did the availability of oil derivatives. Important factors in the crisis included: (1) loss of a beneficial sugar-for-oil trade agreement following the disintegration of the Soviet Union, (2) rising international oil prices following Iraq's 1990 invasion of Kuwait, (3) a slump in the sugar market, and (4) the United States tightening its embargo against Cuba.

In August 2004, Hurricane Charley caused major damage to Cuba's electricity infrastructure, including disconnecting the entirety of Pinar del Río Province from the Sistema Eléctrico Nacional (SEN).

== Development ==
In 2005, Fidel Castro announced that Cuba would undertake an Energy Revolution, through which it would decentralize physical energy infrastructure and decarbonize its economy by over one-third. The government framed the campaign as a crucial event in Cuba's national liberation and its socialist development.

The Energy Revolution introduced a distributed system of energy generation, with a focus on improving efficiency and incorporating renewable energy sources. The campaign decentralized SEN's infrastructure, making energy infrastructure in Cuba significantly more resilient to risk of damage from hurricanes. It also stabilized electricity supply, stopping blackouts that had been frequent since the 1980s.

The Energy Revolution implemented progressive electricity tariffs.

The campaign also replaced durable goods with energy saving equipment.

Cuba restructured its social worker program to include specialized work fronts for the Energy Revolution. Social workers were important in the upgrading durable goods to more energy efficient replacements. Thirteen thousand social workers were involved in upgrading durable goods, a process that began in July 2005 when workers traveled door-to-door to remove incandescent light blubs and replace them with fluorescent lights free of charge. During these visits, social workers also made household inventories of appliances. They later returned with more energy efficient models, replacing a total of 30 million electronic items such as refrigerators, televisions, and rice cookers.

As part of Cuba's efforts to spread the Energy Revolution through ALBA, social workers traveled to 11 countries in the Caribbean and Latin America to help develop energy efficiency projects in those countries.

Through its energy-saving program, Cuba's Ministry of Education held Energy Revolution educational events for the public, including thousands of community workshops.

The Energy Revolution included the establishment of national programs to develop renewable energy technology, as well the creation of a ministerial Department for Renewable Energy which was added to the Ministry of Basic Industry.

Oil from Venezuela was an important factor in the success of the Energy Revolution. Cuba had access to Venezuelan oil through its membership in Petrocaribe under non-market conditions. The availability of Venezuelan oil meant that Cuba could still increase its energy use in absolute terms during the Energy Revolution.

The Energy Revolution succeeded in drastically decarbonizing Cuba's economy. In the view of academic Gustav Cederlöf, the Energy Revolution marks the end of Cuba's Special Period.

However, Cuba remains dependent on imported oil, requiring 100,000 barrels of oil daily to supply electricity (15 TWh in 2023).
