= Francisco Morales Lomas =

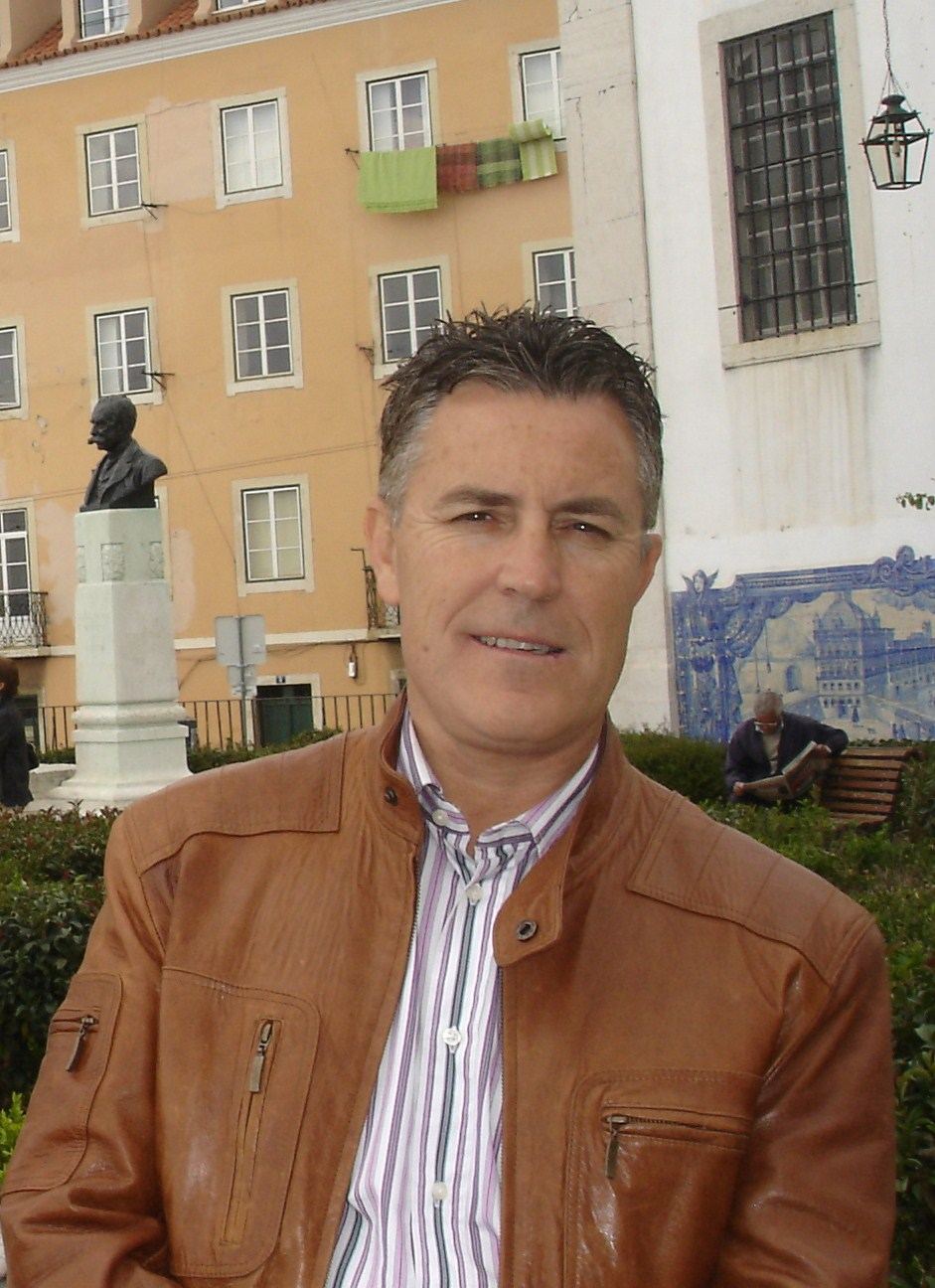
- Lomas in 2008
- Born: 1957 (age 68–69); Campillo de Arenas, Jaén, Spain
- Occupations: Poet; Novelist; Playwright; Essayist; Literary critic

Francisco Morales Lomas (b. Campillo de Arenas (Jaén, Spain) 1957) is a poet, novelist, playwright, essayist and literary critic, and member of the Generation of Transition. His poetry has been defined as a faithful representative of human solidarity, for his personal commitment and aesthetic values.

== Biography ==
He studied high school at the Minor Seminary and Father Manjón of Granada. University education in Grenada in the same period Javier Egea, Luis García Montero, Manuel Gahete, Fernando de Villena and Jose Lupiáñez, with student teachers as well known as Juan Carlos Rodríguez Gómez, Emilio Orozco Diaz and Gregorio Salvador, currently vice president of the Real Spanish Academy. In Granada he lived until twenty-three and, after five years in Barcelona, where he was a member of the Azores in Malaga where he currently resides.

- President of the Andalusian Association of Writers and Literary Critics and president of the jury that awarded the Critics Prize Andalusia.
- Professor of Castilian Language and Literature, Ph.D. in Hispanic Studies, BA in Law and Philosophy, Professor, University of Málaga. Vocal Literature from the University of Malaga.
- President and Member of various sworn Literary Awards as Young Creators (Junta de Andalucía), Poetry Prize (University of Malaga), Premio Vicente Blasco Ibanez (Valencia), Premio Andalucia (Fondón-Almería) ... Opinion columnist in various media and literary critic. He specializes in Valle-Inclan.

== Awards ==
- Finalist in the National Literature Prize (Poetry) in 2006 with his book Narrative of the century Andalusia.
- Finalist 1998, 1999 and 2002 Critics Prize with Anniversary of the Word, and air Temptation Ballad of Motlawa; and Andalusia Critics Award in 1998.
- Joaquin Guichot Prize of the Ministry of Education and Science.
- Journalism Award from the Ministry of Economy.
- Doña Mencia de Salcedo Award Theater 2002 for the play A squat in your heart.

== Narrative ==
- The Shroud of the stars, Ed Corona del Sur, Malaga, 1999. ISBN 84-95288-08-7.
- Games Rubber Kylix Collection, Ed Books Encasa, Malaga, 2002. ISBN 84-95674-07-6.
- Candiota, Editorial Sarria, Malaga, 2003. ISBN 84-95129-76-0.
- The long march, Editorial Arguval, Malaga, 2004. ISBN 84-95948-56-7.
- The strange flight Ana Remember, Editorial Alhulia, Granada, 2007. ISBN 978-84-96641-006.
- Thesis of my grandmother and other stories of the South, Editorial Aljaima, Malaga, 2009. ISBN 978-84-95534-62-0.
- An intruder in the sky in Andalusia, nature and art, Ministry of Environment of the Junta de Andalucía, 2005. ISBN 84-932141-1-6
- The return in republican history, foreword by Rosa Regas, Liberman Publishing Group, Jaén, 2006. ISBN 978-84-95233-30-1
- The Labyrinth of hope in the clouds tam tam, Colección El Defensor de Granada, Caja Granada, 2008. ISBN 978-84-96660-48-9
- Grandma Paper-Digital Literary Magazine of Literature and Literary Criticism, nos. 80 and 81 August 2004. [ISSN 1698-3416]
- Germany, Paper-Digital Literary Magazine of Literature and Literary Criticism, Vol. 132, August 2005. [ISSN 1698-3416]

== Poetry ==
- Twenty Andalusian poems, Ediciones Cla, Bilbao, 1981. ISBN 84-228-0176-0
- Garbage heart Rounds Ediciones, Barcelona, 1985. ISBN 84-7541-824-4
- Azalea, Canente, Malaga, 1991. [DL MA-1675-1991]
- Senara, Suite Doralice, Ediciones Antonio Ubago, Granada, 1996. ISBN 84-89430-10-1
- Anniversary of the word, Provincial, Jaén, 1998. (Finalist Critics Award and the Critics' Prize Andalusia) ISBN 84-89560-40-4
- Temptation air, Provincial, Suite Puerta del Mar, Malaga, 1999. (Finalist for the Prix de la Critique) ISBN 84-7785-338-X
- Ballad of Motlawa, Cuadernos de Sandua, CajaSur, Córdoba, 2001. (Finalist for the Prix de la Critique) ISBN 84-7959-409-8
- Salumbre, Collection Blue and Earth, Ed Corona del Sur, Malaga, 2002. ISBN 84-95849-05-4
- Phaeacia Island, Sea Water Collection, Ed Corona del Sur, Malaga 2002. ISBN 84-95849-32-1
- Eternity without a name, Transit, Giennenses Studies Institute, Diputación de Jaén, 2005. ISBN 84-96047-45-8
- Transit (1981–2003). Anthology. Critical study of Alberto Tores, Giennenses Studies Institute, Diputación de Jaén, 2005. ISBN 84-96047-45-8
- Dark Night of the body, Col. Ancha del Carmen, Ayuntamiento de Málaga, 2006.
- The water in his hands, Aula de Literatura José Gallows, Municipal Foundation of Culture 'Luis Ortega Bru', San Roque, 2006. [Dep Legal CA-609/94].
- The last rain, Ediciones Carena, Barcelona, 2009, ISBN 978-84-92619-07-8
- Gate of the world (in print)

== Theater ==
- The lizard, Lavender, Granada, 2001. [ISSN 1139-9139]
- A squatter in your heart, Lavender, Granada, 2003. [ISSN 1139-9139]
- The yaya Mauritania, EntreRíos, Granada, 2005. [ISSN 1699-3047]
- The urologist, Lavender, Granada, 2007. [ISSN 1139-9139]
- The cannibal, Lavender, Granada, 2009. [ISSN 1139-9139]
- Cannibal theater (14 short plays), Ed Fundamentos, Madrid, 2009, ISBN 978-84-245-1176-0 The works collected in this collection are: The cannibal, Family stuff, The Accident, The spiritual bank, the butane, the divine smoker, the lizard, The dead idols, Meditation, Parnassus, The urologist, a squatter in your heart and the yaya of Mauritania.
- Happy Birthday, Dad (in press)

== Literary criticism ==
- Andalusian poetry released. An approach to the Andalusian poets anthology of the last quarter century, South Corona Publishing, Malaga, 2001. (Work done in collaboration). ISBN 84-95288-67-2
- Literature in Andalucia. Storytellers of the twentieth century. Foreword by Jose Maria Vaz de Soto (collaboration), Ministry of Education of the Andalusian-Provincial Education Delegation, Malaga, 2001. ISBN 84-699-4732-X
- Sailing vessel Andalusian literature current (partnerships), Ministry of Education of the Junta de Andalucía, Sevilla, 2002 (Premio Joaquin Guichot Research).
- The search for self in the lyric of RA, Editorial Corona del Sur, Malaga, 1998. [DL MA-1528-98.]
- Twentieth century poetry in Andalucia. From Modernism to Canticle, foreword by Leopoldo de Luis, Ed Aljaima, Malaga, 2004. ISBN 84-95534-24-X
- Contemporary Spanish Narrative, Centro de Ediciones de la Diputación, Malaga, 2002. ISBN 84-7785-534-X
- Narrative of the century Andalusian (1975–2002), Ed Aljaima, Malaga, 2005. (National Book Award Finalist. Ensayo). ISBN 84-95534-35-5
- The lyrics of Valle-Inclan. Rhythmic system and thematic-symbolic aspects, Publication of the university, Malaga, 2005. ISBN 84-9747-088-5
- Journeys of the Spanish lyric, Centro de Ediciones de la Diputación, Malaga, 2005 ISBN 978-84-7785-739-6
- Journalism and Literature in Malaga, Unicaja, Malaga, 2006. ISBN 84-95979-56-X
- Anthology of poems in tribute to the Republic (in collaboration), Centro de Ediciones de la Diputación, Malaga, 2006. ISBN 84-7785-749-0
- Poetry and grotesque in Valle-Inclan. The pipe of kif, Ed Alhulia, Granada, 2007. ISBN 978-84-96641-43-3
- Between XX and XXI. Andalusian poetry anthology. Volume I, Ediciones Carena, Barcelona, 2007. ISBN 978-84-96357-66-2
- Between XX and XXI. Andalusian poetry anthology. Volume II, Ediciones Carena, Barcelona, 2009. ISBN 978-84-96357-83-9
- Highlights of Andalusia, Ed Aljaima, Malaga, 2008. ISBN 978-84-95534-46-0
- Commitment and fantasy. The narrative of Antonio Martínez Menchén. Giennenses Studies Institute, Jaén, 2008. ISBN 978-84-96047-88-4
- Invitation to freedom. The poetry of Manuel Altolaguirre Publications Service University of Malaga, 2009. ISBN 978-84-9747-284-5
- Living poetry. Trials of contemporary poetry (in press)
