= ALBA =

Intergovernmental organization of Latin American and Caribbean states

Bolivarian Alliance for the Peoples of Our America – Peoples' Trade Treaty Alianza Bolivariana para los Pueblos de Nuestra América – Tratado de Comercio de los Pueblos (Spanish)
- Emblem

- Headquarters: Caracas
- Official languages: Spanish; English
- Member states: 10 full members: Antigua and Barbuda; Bolivia (suspended); Cuba; Dominica; Grenada; Nicaragua; Saint Kitts and Nevis; Saint Lucia; Saint Vincent and the Grenadines; Venezuela; Pending full membership; Suriname (Note: In addition, Suriname is a "special guest member" that intends to become a full member.); Observers; Haiti; Iran; Former members; Honduras; Ecuador; Former observer; Syria

Leaders
  - Secretary General: (Venezuela) Jorge Arreaza

Establishment
  - Cuba–Venezuela Agreement: 14 December 2004
  - People's Trade Agreement: 29 April 2006

Area
  - Total: 2,513,337 km^{2} (970,405 sq mi)

Population
  - 2008 estimate: 69,513,221
  - Density: 27.65/km^{2} (71.6/sq mi)
- GDP (PPP): 2008 estimate
  - Total: $636.481 billion
  - Per capita: $9,156
- Currency: 5 currencies: (Venezuela) Bolívar; (Bolivia) Boliviano; (Nicaragua) Córdoba; (Antigua and Barbuda) (Dominica) (Grenada) (Saint Kitts and Nevis) (Saint Lucia) (Saint Vincent and the Grenadines) EC dollar; (Cuba) Peso
- Time zone: UTC−4 to −6
- Internet TLD: 10 TLDs: (Antigua and Barbuda) .ag; (Bolivia) .bo; (Cuba) .cu; (Dominica) .dm; (Grenada) .gd; (Nicaragua) .ni; (Saint Kitts and Nevis) .kn; (Saint Lucia) .lc; (Saint Vincent and the Grenadines) .vc; (Venezuela) .ve
- Website albatcp.org

ALBA or ALBA–TCP, formally the Bolivarian Alliance for the Peoples of Our America (Spanish: Alianza Bolivariana para los Pueblos de Nuestra América) or the Bolivarian Alliance for the Peoples of Our America – Peoples' Trade Treaty (Spanish: Alianza Bolivariana para los Pueblos de Nuestra América – Tratado de Comercio de los Pueblos), is an intergovernmental organization based on the idea of political and economic integration of Latin American and Caribbean countries.

Founded initially by Cuba and Venezuela in 2004, it is associated with socialist and social democratic governments wishing to consolidate regional economic integration based on a vision of social welfare, bartering and mutual economic aid. The ten member countries are Antigua and Barbuda, Bolivia, Cuba, Dominica, Grenada, Nicaragua, Saint Kitts and Nevis, Saint Lucia, Saint Vincent and the Grenadines and Venezuela. Suriname was admitted to ALBA as a guest country at a February 2012 summit.

== History ==
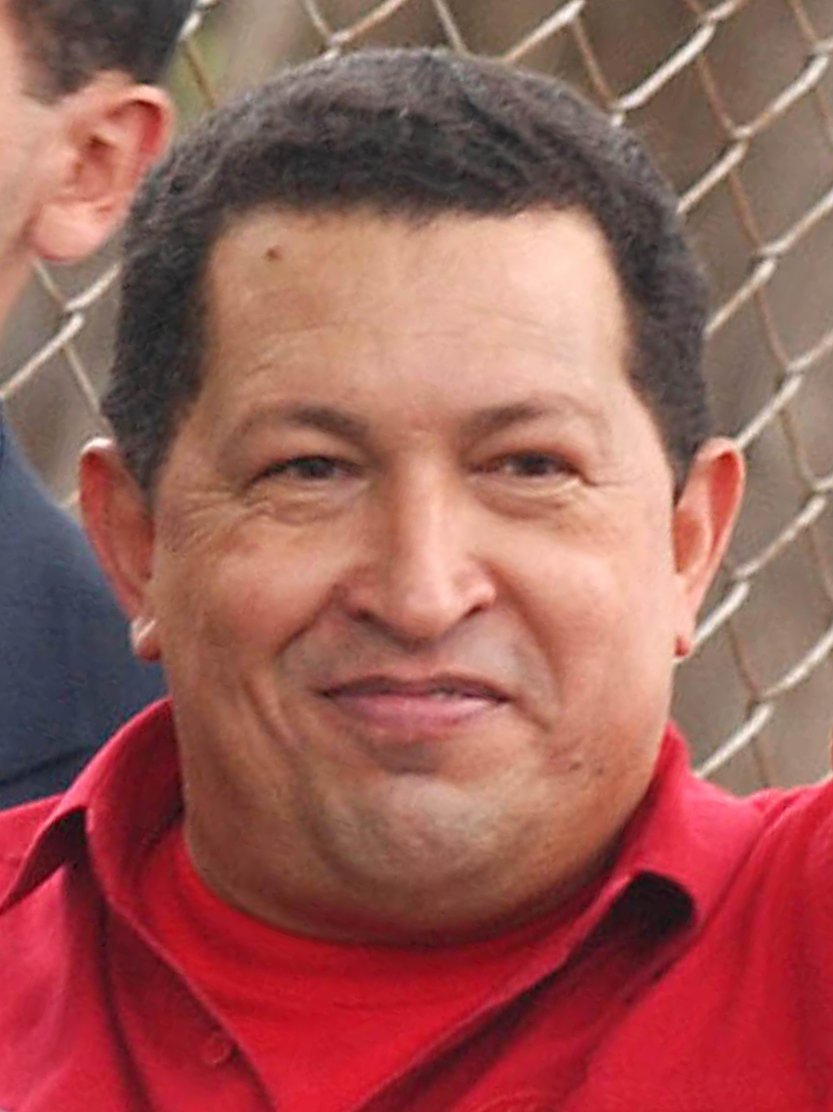
Late Venezuelan President Hugo Chávez, founder of ALBA

The agreement was proposed by the government of Venezuela, led by Hugo Chávez as an alternative to the Free Trade Area of the Americas (FTAA or ALCA in Spanish, an agreement proposed by the United States), which never materialized.

This Cuba–Venezuela Agreement, signed on 14 December 2004, by President Chávez and Cuban leader Fidel Castro, was aimed at the exchange of medical and educational resources and petroleum between the two nations. Venezuela began to deliver about 96,000 barrels of oil per day from its state-owned oil company, PDVSA, to Cuba at very favorable prices. In exchange, Cuba sent 20,000 state-employed medical staff and thousands of teachers to Venezuela's poorest states. The agreement also made it possible for Venezuelans to travel to Cuba for specialized medical care, free of charge.

When it was launched in 2004, ALBA had only two member states, Venezuela and Cuba. Subsequently, a number of other Latin American and Caribbean nations entered into this 'Peoples' Trade Agreement' (Spanish: Tratado de Comercio de los Pueblos, or TCP), which aims to implement the principles of ALBA. Bolivia under Evo Morales joined in 2006, Nicaragua under Daniel Ortega in 2007, and Ecuador under Rafael Correa in 2009. Honduras, under Manuel Zelaya, joined in 2008, but withdrew in 2010 after the 2009 Honduran coup d'état. The Caribbean nations Antigua and Barbuda, Dominica, Saint Vincent and the Grenadines and Saint Lucia also joined.

Jamaica, at the invitation of Chávez, and Mexico, at the invitation of Ortega, were invited to join the ALBA countries. Chávez also invited the countries of Central America to join ALBA, and invited Argentina to use the virtual currency SUCRE for trade transactions. In the 11th Summit of ALBA in February 2012, Suriname, Saint Lucia and Haiti requested admission to the organization. Haiti was granted the special status of permanent member and the other two countries were named special members, while awaiting their full incorporation.

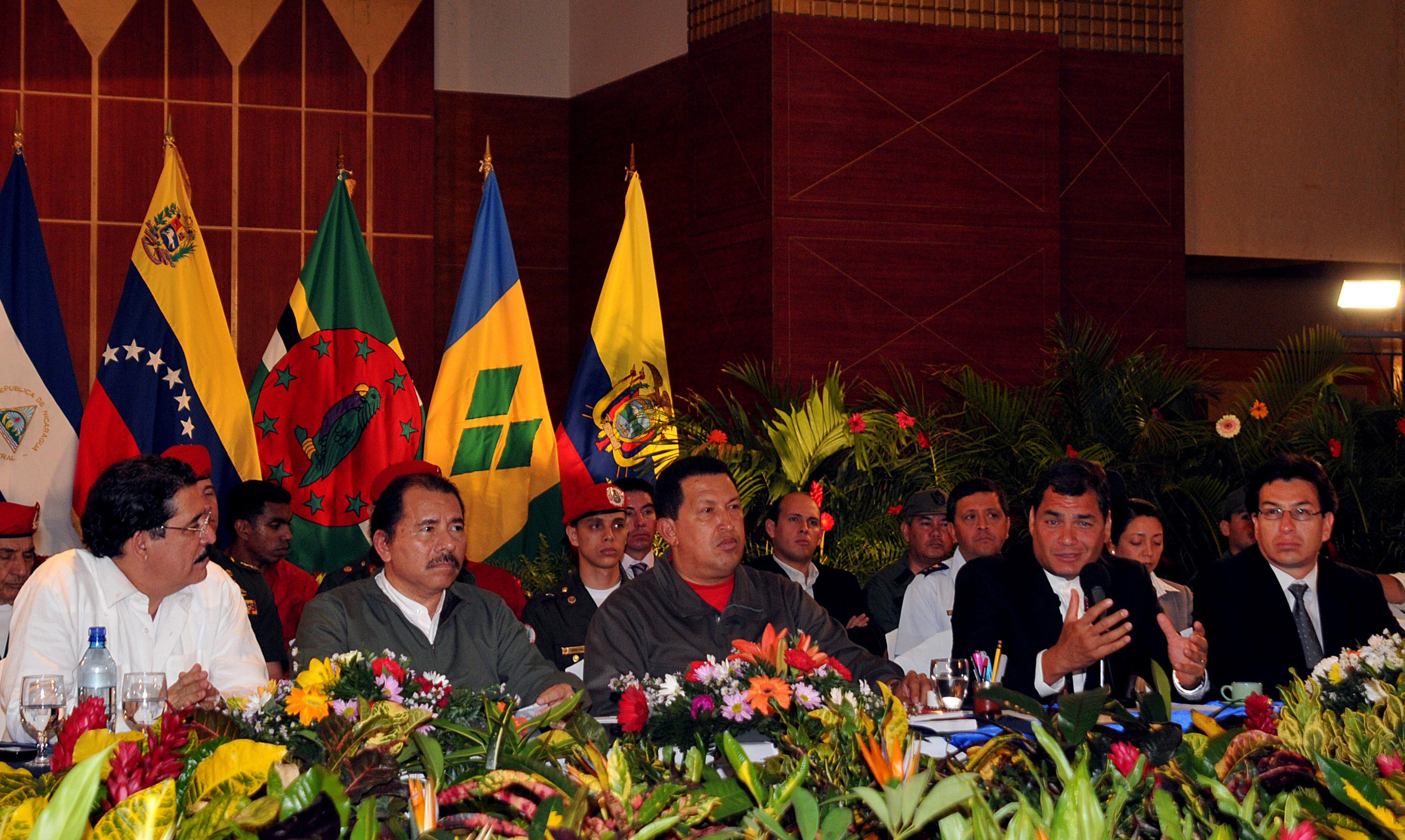
VII Extraordinary ALBA Summit in Managua, Nicaragua, 2009

In July 2013, Chávez was honored posthumously by the nine member countries of the group and special guests Uruguay, Argentina, Brazil, Suriname, Guyana and Haiti at the group's 12th Presidential Summit in Guayaquil, Ecuador.

In December 2014, Grenada and Saint Kitts and Nevis were accepted as full members during the 13th Summit of the Alliance, which occurred in Havana, Cuba.

Ecuador withdrew from ALBA in August 2018. Bolivia's interim government withdrew in November 2019 during the political crisis, but the newly elected government of Luis Arce rejoined following the 2020 Bolivian general election.

Amid the international isolation Russia is facing due to the invasion of Ukraine, ALBA invited Russia to participate at the 2023 ALBA Games.

Bolivia was suspended by ALBA after the 2025 general election, following statements by newly elected president Rodrigo Paz Pereira against member countries Cuba, Nicaragua and Venezuela.

=== Virtual currency ===
In October 2009, ALBA leaders agreed at a summit in Bolivia to create a virtual currency, named the SUCRE. "The document is approved," said Bolivian President Evo Morales, the summit host. President of Venezuela Hugo Chávez announced "The sucre [is] an autonomous and sovereign monetary system that will be agreed upon today so that it can be implemented in 2010." As of 2015, the virtual currency is being used to compensate trade between Bolivia, Cuba, Nicaragua, and especially Ecuador and Venezuela.

=== Summits of heads of state and government ===
Summit	Date	Location	Country	Decisions
I Ordinary	14 December 2004	Havana	Cuba	Founding summit of ALBA. Cuba-Venezuela Agreement signed by presidents Hugo Chávez and Fidel Castro.
II Ordinary	27–28 April 2005	Havana	Cuba	Attended by presidents Hugo Chávez and Fidel Castro.
III Ordinary	29 April 2006	Havana	Cuba	Attended by presidents Hugo Chávez, Fidel Castro and Evo Morales from Bolivia, who joins the group. The TCP is signed.
IV Ordinary	10 January 2007	Managua	Nicaragua	Meeting coinciding with inauguration as president of Nicaragua of Daniel Ortega, who announces the entry in the bloc as fourth country member.
V Ordinary	28–29 April 2007	Barquisimeto	Venezuela	
VI Ordinary	24–26 January 2008	Caracas	Venezuela	Dominica joins the bloc.
I Extraordinary	22 April 2008	Caracas	Venezuela	
II Extraordinary	25 August 2008	Tegucigalpa	Honduras	Honduras joins the bloc.
III Extraordinary	26 November 2008	Caracas	Venezuela	
IV Extraordinary	2 February 2009	Caracas	Venezuela	Celebration of the tenth anniversary of Bolivarian Revolution.
V Extraordinary	16–17 April 2009	Cumaná	Venezuela	
VI Extraordinary	24 June 2009	Maracay	Venezuela	Antigua and Barbuda, Ecuador and Saint Vincent and the Grenadines join the bloc.
VII Extraordinary	29 June 2009	Managua	Nicaragua	Condemnation of the coup d'état in Honduras and demand of restoration of deposed president Manuel Zelaya.
VII Ordinary	16–17 October 2009	Cochabamba	Bolivia	The Unified System for Regional Compensation (SUCRE) is adopted.
VIII Ordinary	13–14 December 2009	Havana	Cuba	Celebration of the fifth anniversary of the bloc.
IX Ordinary	19 April 2010	Caracas	Venezuela	Honduras had left the group.
X Ordinary	25 June 2010	Otavalo	Ecuador	
XI Ordinary	4–5 February 2012	Caracas	Venezuela	
XII Ordinary	30 July 2013	Guayaquil	Ecuador	Saint Lucia joins the bloc.
VIII Extraordinary	20 October 2014	Havana	Cuba	Summit to deal with the Ebola crisis.
XIII Ordinary	14 December 2014	Havana	Cuba	Grenada and Saint Kitts and Nevis join the bloc. Celebration of the tenth anniversary of the bloc.
IX Extraordinary	17 March 2015	Caracas	Venezuela	
XIV Ordinary	5 March 2017	Caracas	Venezuela	
XV Ordinary	5 March 2018	Caracas	Venezuela	
XVI Ordinary	14 December 2018	Havana	Cuba	
XVII Ordinary	14 December 2019	Havana	Cuba	Celebration of the fifteenth anniversary of the bloc.
XVIII Ordinary	14 December 2020	videoconference		Celebration of the sixteenth anniversary of the bloc and of the rejoining of Bolivia into it.
XIX Ordinary	24 June 2021	Caracas	Venezuela	Celebration of the 200th anniversary of the Battle of Carabobo.
XX Ordinary	14 December 2021	Havana	Cuba	
XXI Ordinary	27 May 2022	Havana	Cuba	
XXII Ordinary	14 December 2022	Havana	Cuba	Celebration of the eighteenth anniversary of the bloc.
XXIII Ordinary	24 April 2024	Caracas	Venezuela	
XXIV Ordinary	14 December 2024	Caracas	Venezuela	Celebration of the 20th anniversary of the bloc.
XXV Ordinary	14 December 2025	videoconference		

== Membership ==
=== Full members ===
Common name	Official name	Join date	Population	Area (km^{2})	E.E.Z + Area (km^{2})	GDP PPP (US$ bn)	Capital
Antigua and Barbuda	Antigua and Barbuda	24 June 2009	97,118	442	110,531	1.575	St. John's
Bolivia (Suspended)	Plurinational State of Bolivia	29 April 2006	9,119,152	1,098,581		50.904	Sucre
Cuba	Republic of Cuba	14 December 2004	11,451,652	110,861	460,637	114.100	Havana
Dominica	Commonwealth of Dominica	20 January 2008	72,660	754	29,736	0.977	Roseau
Grenada	Grenada	14 December 2014	111,454	348.5	27,770	1.467	St. George's
Nicaragua	Republic of Nicaragua	11 January 2007	6,466,199	129,495	254,254	18.878	Managua
Saint Kitts and Nevis	Federation of Saint Kitts and Nevis	14 December 2014	54,961	261	10,235	1.087	Basseterre
Saint Lucia	Saint Lucia	20 July 2013	180,870	617	16,156	2.101	Castries
St. Vincent and the Grenadines	Saint Vincent and the Grenadines	24 June 2009	120,000	389	36,691	1.259	Kingstown
Venezuela	Bolivarian Republic of Venezuela	14 December 2004	28,199,825	916,445	1,387,952	374.111	Caracas
ALBA–TCP totals	10 countries		46,166,389	1,159,612.5	2,333,962	515.555	

=== Observer members ===
Common name	Official name	Population	Capital
Haiti	Republic of Haiti	10,847,334	Port-au-Prince
Iran	Islamic Republic of Iran	81,672,300	Tehran

=== Former members ===
Common name	Official name	Join year	Withdrawal year	Population	Capital
Honduras	Republic of Honduras	2008	2010	9,112,867	Tegucigalpa
Ecuador	Republic of Ecuador	2009	2018	16,385,068	Quito

== Other ALBA initiatives ==
A clickable Euler diagram showing the relationships between various multinational organizations in the Americas

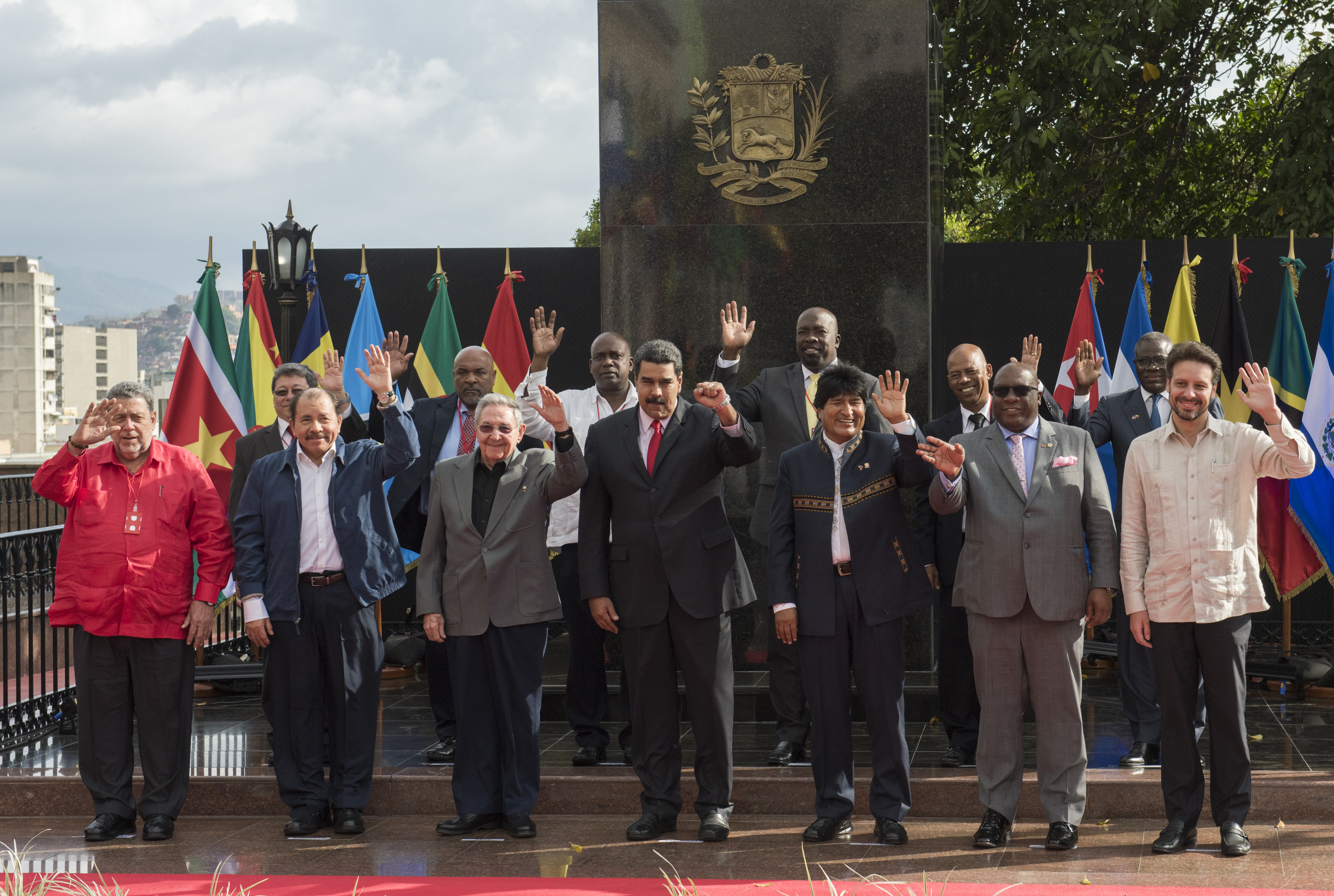
XIV ALBA-TCP summit, 2017

=== PetroCaribe ===
Based on the earlier San José Accords (1980) and Caracas Energy Accords (2000) between Venezuela and a number of Caribbean states, Petrocaribe was founded in 2005 to facilitate oil trade under a concessionary financial agreement. The initiative has provided the Caribbean member states with important hydrocarbon resources, which many do not possess on their territories, in exchange for services and goods. In the case of Cuba, a nation largely deprived of oil since the fall of the Soviet Union in 1991, Petrocaribe has provided oil in exchange for medical doctors.

=== Other energy initiatives ===
As part of Cuba's efforts to spread its Energy Revolution campaign through ALBA, Cuban social workers traveled to 11 countries in the Caribbean and Latin America to help develop energy efficiency projects in those countries.

=== TeleSUR ===
Launched in 2005, TeleSUR is a media network that provides news and current affairs broadcasts throughout the ALBA bloc. The network has an internet based television channel and is a cooperative effort between the governments of Venezuela, Cuba and Nicaragua.

=== PETROSUR ===
PETROSUR is an inter-governmental energy alliance between Venezuelan PDVSA, Argentinean YPF, and Brazilian Petrobras nationalized oil companies. The goal of this initiative is to provide funding for social welfare programs within these nations.

=== ALBA at the UNFCCC ===
ALBA also speaks on behalf of its member states, if they find a common position in intergovernmental meetings of the UNFCCC.

== Criticism ==
In July 2018, President Lenín Moreno of Ecuador distanced himself from ALBA, stating that the organization "has not worked for a while." In August 2018, Ecuador officially withdrew from ALBA.

Karen Longaric, appointed as foreign minister by Jeanine Áñez's interim government, announced the formal departure of the country from ALBA in November 2019 over "interference" in Bolivia's political crisis. Bolivia remained in ALBA after the Áñez government was defeated in the 2020 Bolivian general election.

== See also ==
- Andean Community of Nations
- Association of Caribbean States
- Axis of Resistance
- Belt and Road Initiative
- CARIFORUM
- Community of Latin American and Caribbean States (CELAC)
- Copenhagen Accord
- CSTO
- Eurasian Economic Union
- Foro de São Paulo
- International trade
- Latin American integration
- Lima Group
- Mercosur
- Non Aligned Movement
- Pacific Alliance
- PetroCaribe
- Pink tide
- Alliance of Sahel States
- Social security
- SUCRE
- Trade bloc
- Union of South American Nations
- Warsaw Pact
- Free Trade Area of the Americas (FTAA or ALCA)
- Latin American Free Trade Agreement
- North American Free Trade Agreement
