= Ricardo Morales =

Ricardo Morales may refer to:

- Ricardo Morales (musician) (born 1972), American clarinetist
- Ricardo Morales (tennis) (1907–2007), Cuban professional tennis player
- Ricardo Morales (intelligence agent) (before 1960–1983), Cuban exile and FBI informant
- Ricardo Morales (Law & Order: LA), a fictional character on Law & Order: LA

== See also ==
- Morales (disambiguation)
