= Hector Abdelnour =

Venezuelan military officer

Héctor Abdelnour
- Born: Héctor Antonio Abdelnour Mussa; December 15, 1921; Sucre, Venezuela
- Died: August 1, 2002 (aged 80)
- Occupation: Military

Héctor Antonio Abdelnour Mussa (December 15, 1921 – August 1, 2002) was a Venezuelan military officer of the Navy, who participated in the overthrow of President Marcos Pérez Jiménez and in the shipment of aid and weapons to the Cuban revolution in 1958.

== Career ==
The son of Lebanese immigrants, Abdelnour was born in Pilar, Sucre, and began his military career in 1939 at the Naval School of Venezuela, graduating in 1943 as an Officer of the Navy. During his career he was appointed to different destinations and in 1956 he was promoted to Corvette Captain.

At the beginning of 1958 he participated in the actions carried out by the Armed Forces that culminated in the overthrow of Marcos Pérez Jimenez. He was named Assistant of the Military House by the provisional government, which in the same year carried out a collection among the people of Venezuela, known as un bolivar para la sierra, destined to send aid and weapons to Cuban revolutionaries. Abdelnour was in charge of purchasing the plane to send the aid and participated in that transfer, which took place on December, bound for Sierra Maestra.

In 1959 Abdelnour was promoted to Frigate Captain and continued his military career until 1970.

== Honours and recognitions ==
- 1958 – Order of Francisco de Miranda
- 1959 – Croce Eracliana di Seconda Classe
- 1959 – Medal of the Eloy Alfaro Foundation, Panama
