= Petrocaribe =

Oil procurement agreement

Petrocaribe S.A.
- Type: Public
- Industry: Oil
- Founded: June 2005
- Headquarters: ?
- Products: Oil
- Revenue: ▲USD/$ ? billion (2006)
- Operating income: ▲USD/$ ? billion (2006)
- Net income: ▼USD/$ ? billion (2006)
- Parent: PDVSA
- Website: www.petrocaribe.org

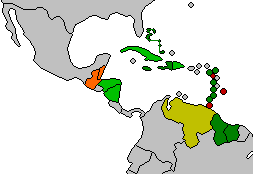
Venezuela Petrocaribe members and CARICOM members Petrocaribe members not part of CARICOM Petrocaribe retired members CARICOM members not part of Petrocaribe

Petrocaribe was a regional oil procurement agreement between Venezuela and Caribbean member states. The trade organization was founded on 29 June 2005 in Puerto La Cruz, Venezuela during the presidency of Hugo Chávez. Venezuela offered member states oil supplies on a concessionary financial agreement. Petrocaribe has been part of the "pink tide" in Latin America seeking to achieve post-neoliberal development in the region. In 2013 Petrocaribe established links with the Bolivarian Alliance for the Americas (ALBA) aiming to go beyond oil trade and promoting economic cooperation. The deal fell apart by 2019 after dwindling oil production, corruption, and oil price fluctuations took their toll.

In November 2022, Saint Vincent and the Grenadines became the first country to resume receipt of oil under the PetroCaribe terms. In 2023, Venezuela stated that it intended to revive the trade program.

== Treaty details ==
The agreement was initiated with the aim of having solidarity with other countries in accordance with Bolivarian Alliance for the Americas (ALBA), and developed from the Caracas Accord. The payment system allows for the purchase of oil at market value for 5%-50% up front with a grace period of one to two years; the remainder can be paid through a 17-25 year financing agreement with 1% interest if oil prices are above US$40 per barrel. The agreement builds on payment terms from the San José Agreement and the Caracas Energy Accord. Energy and Petroleum Minister and President of PDVSA Rafael Ramírez said of the deal that it seeks to cut out the middleman in such transactions: "We're not talking about discounts...We're talking about financial facilities, direct deliveries of products, [and] infrastructure."

== Membership ==
A clickable Euler diagram showing the relationships between various multinational organizations in the Americas

Petrocaribe had a total of 18 members: Antigua and Barbuda, Bahamas, Belize, Cuba, Dominica, Dominican Republic, Grenada, Guatemala, Guyana, Haiti, Honduras, Jamaica, Nicaragua, Saint Kitts and Nevis, Saint Vincent and Grenadines, Saint Lucia, Suriname, and Venezuela.

12 of the members were from the 15-member Caribbean Community (CARICOM). At the first summit, 14 countries joined the trade organization: Antigua and Barbuda, the Bahamas, Belize, Cuba, Dominica, Grenada, Jamaica, Saint Lucia, Saint Kitts and Nevis, Saint Vincent and the Grenadines, Suriname, and Venezuela. At the third summit, Haiti and Nicaragua joined the union. Guatemala joined in July 2008 but left the organization in November 2013 stating that Venezuela had not provided them with the ultra-low financing rates that they had been promised.

Haiti had not been initially invited to the talks, since Venezuela did not recognize its then post-Jean-Bertrand Aristide government. However, Hugo Chávez actively "courted" newly elected president René Préval when he took office, much to Chevron, Exxon, and the US State Department's chagrin. After Venezuela had invested in developing Haitian infrastructure, and after the Haitian government convinced Chevron to deliver the oil from Venezuela, on 8 March 2008 the first shipment of oil was received. Honduras became the 17th member of the alliance in December 2007, under President Manuel Zelaya, ⁣⁣ but left the organization after the 2009 coup d'état before rejoining it in May 2012. Belize set up the Belize Petroleum Energy Company to coordinate for the project.

=== Non-members ===
Barbados denied that it had succumbed to pressure from the United States, which has a strained relationship with Venezuela, as the reason, but has not ruled out agreeing to Petrocaribe in the future. On August 31, 2005, Energy Minister Anthony Wood said that they are weighing options over signing Petrocaribe. In April 2011 Venezuelan president Hugo Chávez renewed his offer for Barbados to join Petrocaribe.

Panama applied for membership on 3 March 2009 and initially said it would continue to join Petrocaribe under the new president, but Panama remains a non-member.

== Summits ==
The first summit, which launched the project was held in Puerto La Cruz, Venezuela. The second summit of Petrocaribe was held in Montego Bay, Jamaica. The third summit was held in Caracas, Venezuela and the fourth summit was held in Cienfuegos, Cuba, in December 2007. The seventh summit was held in Caracas, on 6 April 2013. The membership of Honduras was revived after suspension because of the 2009 Honduran coup; Guatemala became an official new member of Petrocaribe. Summit also propose deeper cooperation between Petrocaribe states and states of ALBA on basis of new economic zone. Summit had discussion also about tourism, air traffic and food security. The 11th Summit was hosted by Haiti in Port-au-Prince.

== Recent development ==
As of 2019, PetroCaribe has mostly dried up because of Venezuela's eroded domestic production and refining, but political and commercial ties in some prominent cases have endured. Critics say PetroCaribe suppressed the development of renewable energy, burdened these small nations with billions of dollars in debt – and spurred corruption. Venezuela oil industry is in turmoil. Venezuela's oil rigs, which had been producing nearly 3 million barrels of crude oil a day in 2014, produce now less than a million barrels a day. In addition to the economic collapse of Venezuela, U.S. sanctions against the country made it almost impossible to route bank payments to Venezuela. The only country receiving crude oil from Venezuela with such preferential treatment is Cuba. Cuba has been able to largely mitigate any significant debts with Venezuela by brokering a deal in which some of its oil is received in exchange for sending doctors to Venezuela.

In 2022, Saint Vincent and the Grenadines received a shipment of oil from Venezuela under the terms of PetroCaribe, becoming the first country to resume PetroCaribe ties. In 2023, Venezuela announced its intention to revive PetroCaribe. In July 2023, CARICOM members called for the removal of U.S. sanctions from Venezuela which prohibit them from purchasing oil under the favorable terms of PetroCaribe.

== See also ==
- SUCRE (currency)
- History of Venezuelan Oil Industry
- Petróleos de Venezuela, S.A.
