= Francisco Morales =

Francisco Morales may refer to:

- Francisco Morales (baseball) (born 1999), Venezuelan baseball pitcher
- Francisco Morales Bermúdez (1921–2022), Peruvian politician and general
- Francisco Morales Lomas, Spanish poet
- Francisco Morales Vivas (born 1971), Argentinian judoka
