= SUCRE =

Proposed regional currency

Sistema Unitario de Compensación Regional de Pagos (Spanish)

ISO 4217
- Code: XSU (numeric: 994)

Unit
- Unit: sucre
- Symbol: XSU or sucre

Issuance
- Central bank: Bolivarian Alliance for the Americas (ALBA)

Map of participants in the ALBA

The SUCRE ([ˈsukɾe]; Spanish: Sistema Unitario de Compensación Regional, "Unified System for Regional Compensation") was a regional currency proposed for commercial exchanges between members of the regional trade bloc Bolivarian Alliance for the Americas (ALBA), which was created as an alternative to the Free Trade Agreement of the Americas (FTAA). The SUCRE was intended to replace the US dollar as a medium of exchange.

== History ==
Transactions in Sucre. The graph shows the evolution of trade using the Sucre 2010–2016. Data for the trade volume between all participants are from the Informe de Gestión 2015. Data for Ecuador from the Central Bank of Ecuador.

The SUCRE was first used as a virtual currency in 2010 in two transactions between Ecuador and Venezuela. International trade between member states in SUCRE reached its maximum in 2012 with 2,646 transactions worth almost 1,066 million US dollars. In each following year, trade in SUCRE shrank. In 2015, there were 752 transactions worth around $345 million.

Under the SUCRE treaty, each state party’s allocation of the common accounting unit was to be backed by obligations or financial instruments denominated in that state’s local currency. This arrangement posed a particular issue for Ecuador, which had adopted the United States dollar as legal tender and therefore did not issue its own national currency.

In the case of ALBA members Dominica, Saint Vincent and the Grenadines, and Antigua and Barbuda, the new currency posed a dilemma as they are already a member of the Eastern Caribbean Currency Union and use the East Caribbean dollar, although none of them had agreed to the treaty establishing the SUCRE and the regional payments clearinghouse.

The SUCRE is named after Antonio José de Sucre, a leading figure in Latin America's independence struggle. Agreement in general terms for the currency was declared in 2009. The formal treaty establishing the regional payments clearinghouse was signed by the six Latin American presidents in Cochabamba, Bolivia, on October 17, 2009. (The former currency of Ecuador, one of the SUCRE's users, was also called the sucre, but was abandoned and replaced by the US dollar after the economic crisis in 1999).

This currency has code XSU in ISO 4217 standard currency list. ISO 4217 Standard definition:

- "Data Standards, ISO 4217 - Currency Code Maintenance: Get the Correct Currency Code". www.six-group.com. SIX Group. 2022-10-01.
- "List One: Currency, fund and precious metal codes" (XLS). www.six-group.com. SIX Group. 2022-09-23.
- "List Two: Fund codes registered with the Maintenance Agency" (XLS). www.six-group.com. SIX Group. 2018-08-29.
- "List Three: Codes for historic denominations of currencies and funds" (XLS). www.six-group.com. SIX Group. 2018-08-22.
- "Overview Amendments" (XLSX). www.six-group.com. SIX Group. 2022-09-23.

In 2013 Uruguay joined the currency.

In 2018, the government of Venezuela proposed using the Petro, instead, for trade within ALBA.

== See also ==
- Economic policy of the Hugo Chávez government
- Fedwire
- CHAPS
- Clearing House Automated Transfer System (CHATS)
- Currency Union
- Eastern Caribbean dollar – A regional currency of the Eastern Caribbean
- Hard bolívar
- Petro
