= Luis Morales =

Luis Morales may refer to:

- Luis Morales (sprinter) (born 1964), Puerto Rican track and field sprinter
- Luis Morales (bishop) (1608–1681), Spanish Roman Catholic bishop
- Luis Morales (politician), Filipino politician
- Luis Abanto Morales (1923–2017), Peruvian singer
- Luis A. Morales (1928–2011), Puerto Rican politician
- Luis de Morales (c. 1512–1586), Spanish painter
- Luis Morales (footballer) (born 2005), Spanish footballer
- Luís Morales (footballer) (born 1992), Mexican footballer
- Luis Morales (cyclist), Uruguayan cyclist, represented Uruguay at the 2007 Pan American Games
- Luis Morales (volleyball), Salvadoran beach volleyball player, see 2008 NORCECA Beach Volleyball Circuit
- Luis Morales (baseball) (born 2002), Cuban baseball player
