= .ni =

Internet country code top-level domain for Nicaragua

- Introduced: 13 October 1989
- TLD type: Country code top-level domain
- Status: Active
- Registry: National University of Engineering
- Sponsor: National University of Engineering
- Intended use: Entities connected with Nicaragua
- Actual use: Popular in Nicaragua; co.ni subdomain is being promoted in Northern Ireland with limited success
- Registered domains: 17,591 (2026)
- Structure: Registrations are made at the third level beneath second-level names
- Documents: .ni Rules (Spanish); Archived 24 September 2006 at the Wayback Machine); co.ni rules Archived 28 September 2007 at the Wayback Machine
- Dispute policies: UDRP
- Registry website: nic.ni

.ni is the Internet country code top-level domain (ccTLD) for Nicaragua.

== Second-level domains ==
Registrations are at the third level beneath several second-level names. There are also a handful of sites directly at the second level, including the registry site itself at nic.ni. Second-level names include:

- .com.ni, Commercial entities
- .gob.ni, Government ministries and organizations
- .edu.ni, Educational entities and organizations
- .org.ni, Non-governmental entities and dependencies
- .nom.ni, Personal websites
- .net.ni, Network organizations
- .mil.ni, Military organizations
- .co.ni, Corporate entities from anywhere in the world
- .biz.ni, Commercial entities
- .int.ni, Organizations with international treaties
- .info.ni, Informational sites
- .tv.ni, Media institutions
