= Álvaro Morales =

Álvaro or Alvaro Morales may refer to:

- Álvaro Morales (actor) (born 1968), Chilean actor
- Álvaro Morales (politician) (born 1980), Spanish politician
- Álvaro Morales (sportscaster), Mexican sports anchor and analyst
- Alvaro Morales (urologist), Canadian urologist and academic
