= Campillo de Arenas =

- city
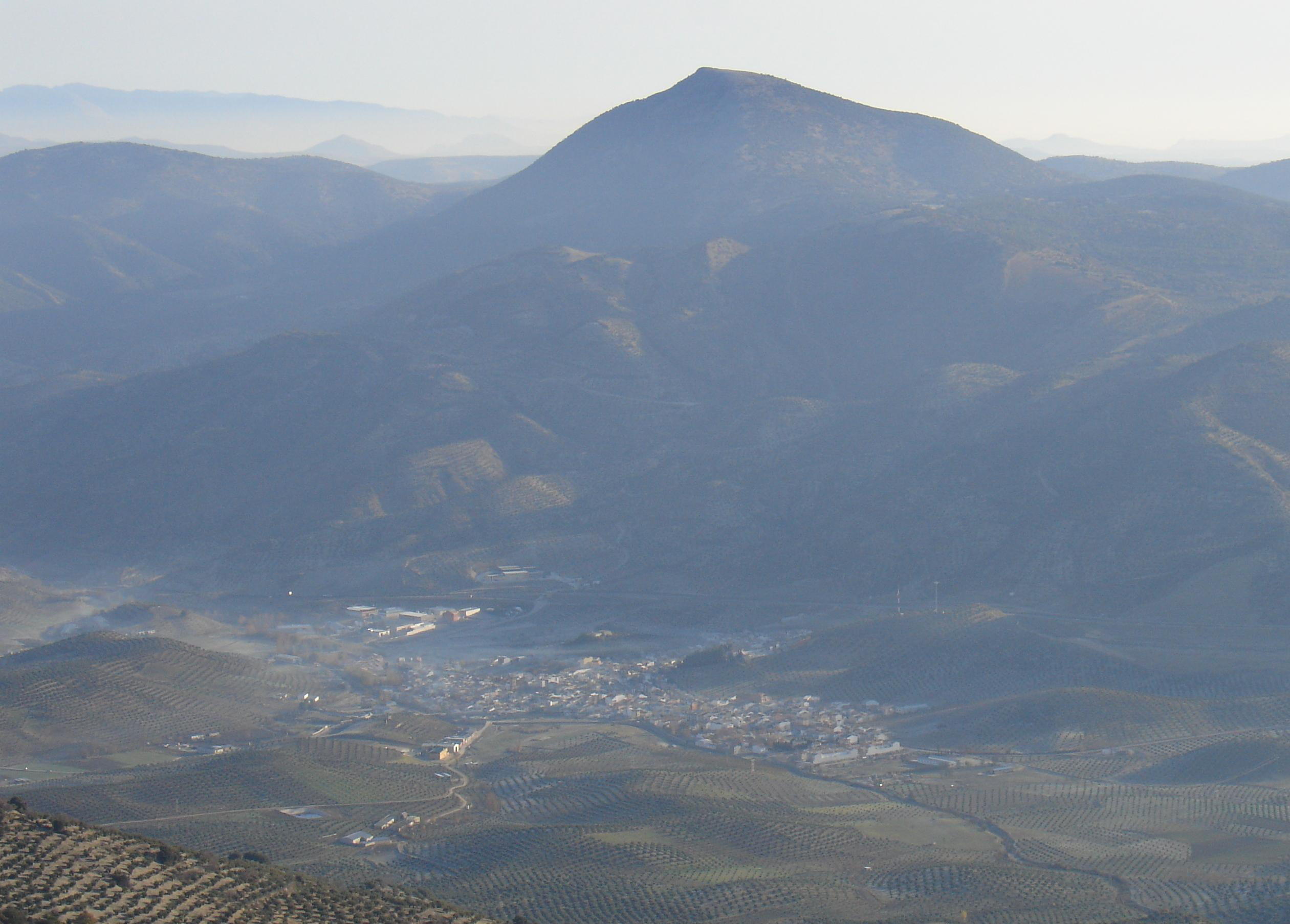

- Flag Coat of arms

- Location within Andalusia Location within Spain
- Coordinates: 37°33′N 3°38′W
- Country: Spain
- Province: Jaén
- Municipality: Campillo de Arenas

Area
  - Total: 114 km^{2} (44 sq mi)
- Elevation: 864 m (2,835 ft)

Population (2025-01-01)
  - Total: 1,711
  - Density: 15.0/km^{2} (38.9/sq mi)
- Time zone: UTC+1 (CET)
  - Summer (DST): UTC+2 (CEST)

Campillo de Arenas is a town located in the province of Jaén, Spain. According to 2024 INE figures, the town had a population of 1703 inhabitants.

== See also ==
- List of municipalities in Jaén
