= 5th Summit of the Americas =

- 5th Summit of the Americas logo
- Host country: Trinidad and Tobago
- Dates: April 17–19, 2009
- Cities: Port of Spain
- Venues: Hyatt Regency Trinidad
- Participants: 33
- Follows: 4th Summit of the Americas
- Precedes: 6th Summit of the Americas
- Website: http://www.fifthsummitoftheamericas.org/

The Fifth Summit of the Americas (VSOA) was held at Port of Spain in Trinidad and Tobago, on April 17–19, 2009.

Organizers planned for the Fifth Summit to focus on a wide-ranging theme: "Securing Our Citizens' Future by Promoting Human Prosperity, Energy Security and Environmental Sustainability."

== Overview ==
The Summits of the Americas are a continuing series of summits bringing together the leaders of North America, Central America, the Caribbean and South America. The function of these summits is to foster discussion of a variety of issues affecting the western hemisphere. These high-level summit meetings have been organized by a number of multilateral bodies under the aegis of the Organization of American States. In the early 1990s, what were formerly ad hoc summits came to be institutionalized into a regular "Summits of the Americas" conference program.

- December 9–11, 1994 -- 1st Summit of the Americas at Miami in the United States.
- December 7–8, 1996 -- Summit of the Americas on Sustainable Development at Santa Cruz de la Sierra in Bolivia.
- April 18–19, 1998 -- 2nd Summit of the Americas at Santiago in Chile.
- April 20–22, 2001 -- 3rd Summit of the Americas, in Quebec City, Canada.
- January 12–13, 2004 -- Monterrey Special Summit of the Americas at Monterrey in Mexico.
- November 4–5, 2005 -- 4th Summit of the Americas at Mar del Plata in Argentina.

== Agenda ==
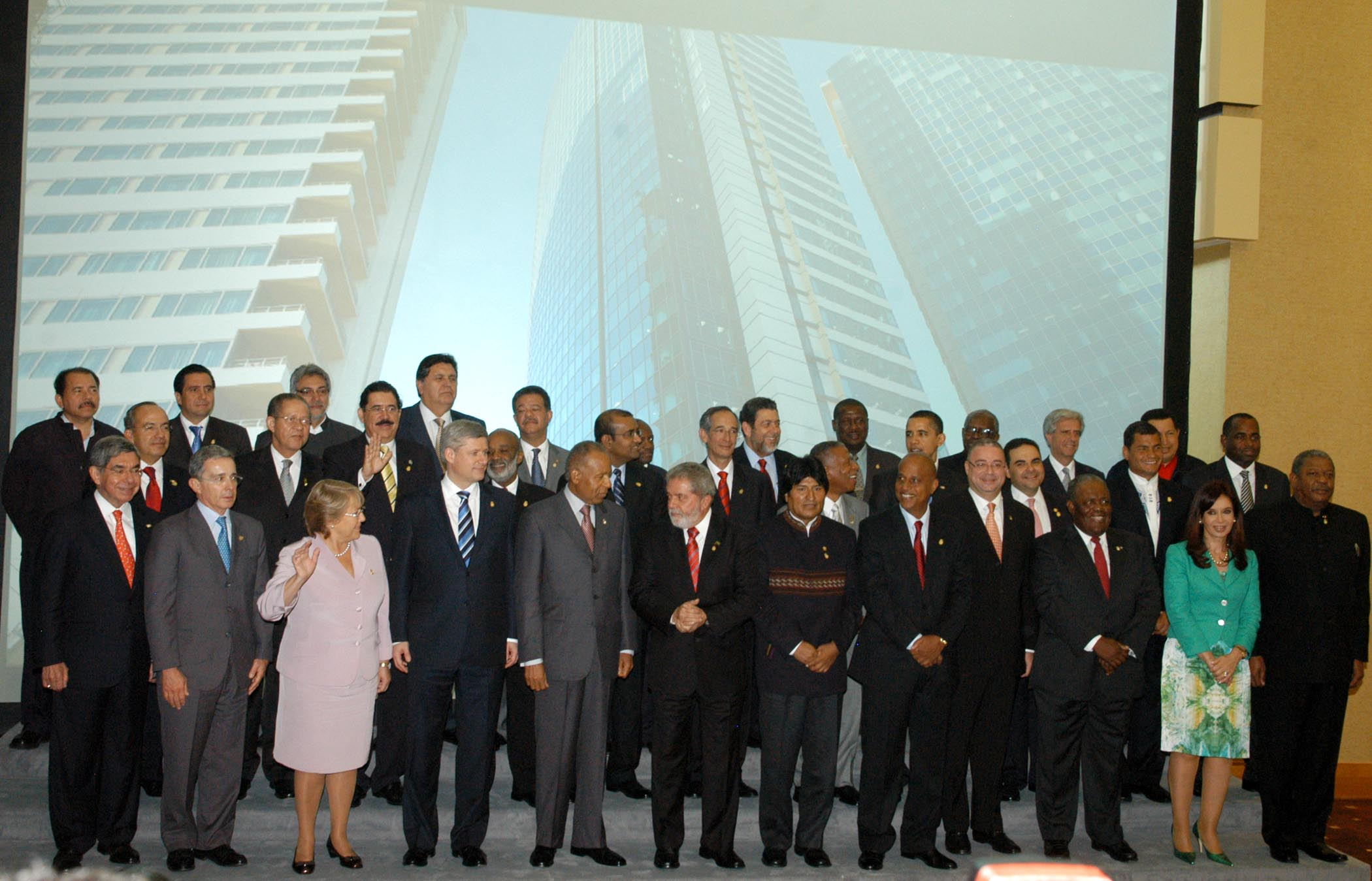
Group photo of leaders attending Port-of-Spain summit.

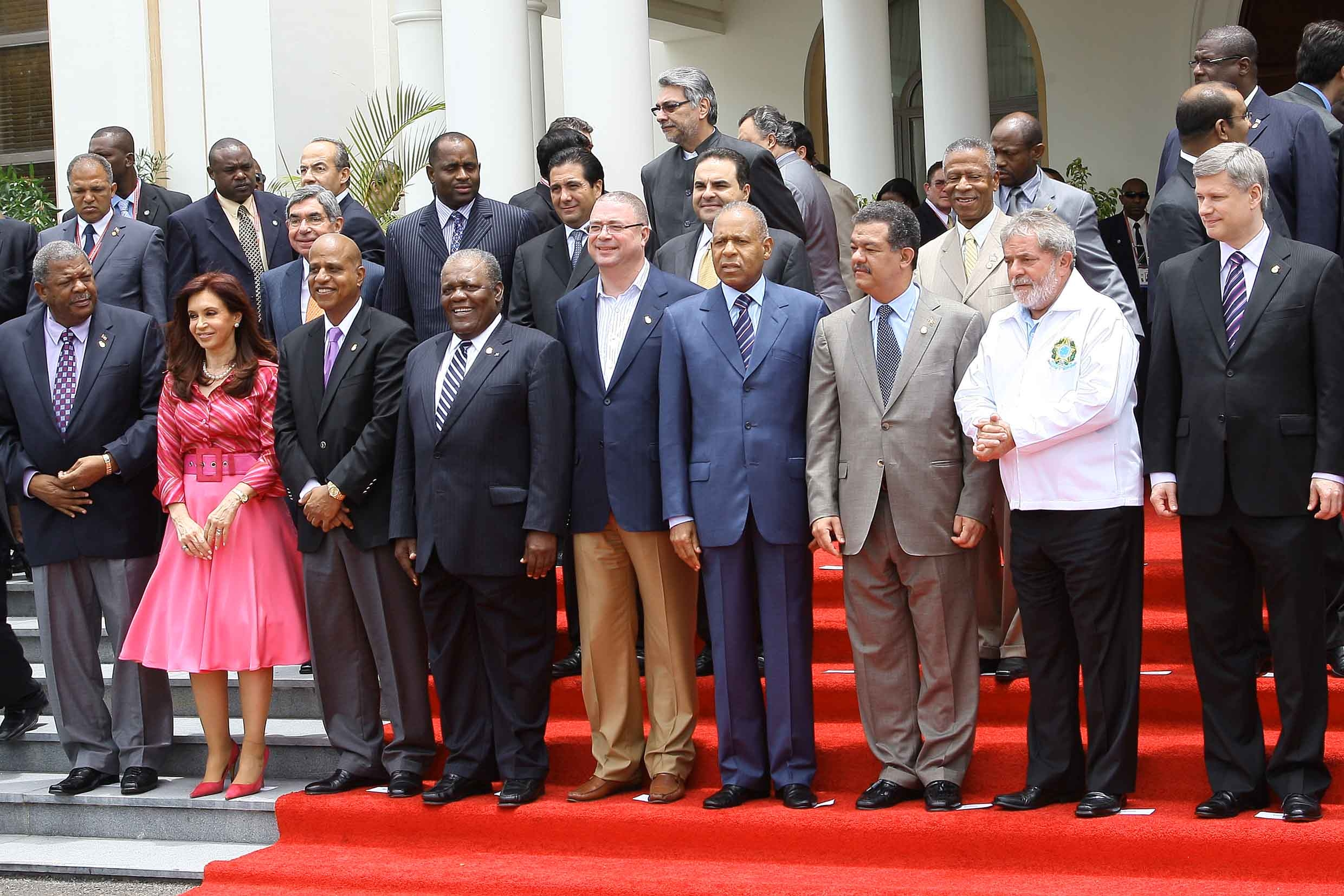
Partial group photo of leaders at the closing Port-of-Spain summit.

The host nation's task in organizing the summit programme was a multi-faceted challenge.

The top issue at the summit was the current economic crisis, which also encompassed issues of access to increased credit and lending from multilateral banks, sub-regional banks and international development banks. Other issues included promoting human prosperity, energy security and environmental sustainability.

Regional leaders had their first face-to-face meeting with United States President Barack Obama at the summit.

Venezuela's President Hugo Chávez used his first meeting with President Obama to argue in favor of lifting the US-led embargo of Cuba. Chávez also used the occasion to publicly present Obama with a copy of Eduardo Galeano's 1971 book Open Veins of Latin America.

== Security ==
The host country's Office for Disaster Preparedness and Management (ODPM) planned to ensure that they would be prepared to deal with the consequences of natural or man-made hazards which might impact the delegates during the Summit of the Americas. The Ministry of National Security and OPDM worked together in anticipation of over 4,000 visitors.

Other American nations made security forces available during the international event. Premier of Bermuda Ewart Brown offered to request 35 soldiers of the Bermuda Regiment to be sent, but the offer was declined as unnecessary. In preparation for the summit, the Jamaica Defence Force (JDF) and the Jamaica Constabulary Force (JCF) sent 124 officers for a three-week training program in Trinidad. The Jamaican contingent was briefed and given all the necessary resources and equipment, and they were expected to bring back to Jamaica any good ideas and best practices which might be observed during the operation.

== Heads of State and Government ==
Summary of Leaders
| Flag and Country | Head of State / Government |
|---|---|
| Antigua and Barbuda | Prime Minister Baldwin Spencer |
| Argentina | President Cristina Fernández de Kirchner |
| Bahamas | Prime Minister Hubert Ingraham |
| Barbados | Prime Minister David Thompson |
| Belize | Prime Minister Dean Barrow |
| Bolivia | President Evo Morales |
| Brazil | President Luiz Inácio Lula da Silva |
| Canada | Prime Minister Stephen Harper |
| Chile | President Michelle Bachelet |
| Colombia | President Álvaro Uribe |
| Costa Rica | President Óscar Arias |
| Dominica | Prime Minister Roosevelt Skerrit |
| Dominican Republic | President Leonel Fernández |
| Ecuador | President Rafael Correa |
| El Salvador | President Tony Saca |
| Grenada | Prime Minister Tillman Thomas |
| Guatemala | President Álvaro Colom |
| Guyana | President Bharrat Jagdeo |
| Haiti | President René Garcia Préval |
| Honduras | President Manuel Zelaya |
| Jamaica | Prime Minister Bruce Golding |
| Mexico | President Felipe Calderón |
| Nicaragua | President Daniel Ortega |
| Panama | President Martín Torrijos |
| Paraguay | President Fernando Lugo |
| Peru | President Alan García |
| Saint Kitts and Nevis | Prime Minister Denzil Douglas |
| Saint Lucia | Prime Minister Stephenson King |
| Saint Vincent and the Grenadines | Prime Minister Ralph Gonsalves |
| Suriname | President Ronald Venetiaan |
| Trinidad and Tobago | Prime Minister Patrick Manning |
| United States of America | President Barack Obama |
| Uruguay | President Tabaré Vázquez |
| Venezuela | President Hugo Chávez |

== Notes ==
| Preceded by 4th Summit of the Americas | Summits of the Americas; 2009; Port of Spain | Succeeded by 6th Summit of the Americas |
