= Monterrey Special Summit of the Americas =

- Monterrey Special Summit of the Americas logo
- Host country: Mexico
- Dates: January 12–13, 2004

The Special Summit of the Americas was held on January 12 and 13, 2004 in Monterrey, Nuevo León, Mexico.

This summit is part of the Summit of the Americas initiative which is carried on by the Organization of American States with the purpose of bringing together the Heads of State and Government in the Hemisphere to discuss and act on political, economic and social issues concerning the Americas. The summit gathered the leaders of all the countries which are members of the OAS, except for Cuba, whose participation from OAS activities had been suspended since 1962 until 2015.

== Overview ==
The "Summits of the Americas" is the name for a continuing series of summits bringing together the leaders of North America and South America. The function of these summits is to foster discussion of a variety of issues affecting the western hemisphere. These high-level summit meetings have been organized by a number of multilateral bodies under the aegis of the Organization of American States. In the early 1990s, what were formerly ad hoc summits came to be institutionalized into a regular "Summits of the Americas" conference program.

- December 9–11, 1994 -- 1st Summit of the Americas at Miami in the United States.
- December 7–8, 1996 -- Summit of the Americas on Sustainable Development at Santa Cruz de la Sierra in Bolivia.
- April 18–19, 1998 -- 2nd Summit of the Americas at Santiago in Chile.
- April 20–22, 2001 -- 3rd Summit of the Americas, in Quebec City, Canada.

== Objectives ==
In light of the economic and political challenges many countries in the region had faced since the 2001 Quebec City Summit of the Americas and because 14 Heads of State and Government in the Hemisphere had assumed office since then, the Government of Canada proposed holding a Special Summit of the Americas to reinforce hemispheric unity before the Fourth Summit of the Americas, which took place in Mar del Plata, Argentina, in 2005.

The goal of the Special Summit was to facilitate hemispheric cooperation at the highest level of government in order to address current economic, social and political challenges in the region. The Special Summit of the Americas focused on three central issues:

- Economic growth with equity.
- Social Development.
- Democratic Governance.

== See also ==
- Summits of the Americas
