= 4th Summit of the Americas =

- 4th Summit of the Americas logo
- Host country: Argentina
- Dates: November 4–5, 2005
- Follows: 3rd Summit of the Americas
- Precedes: 5th Summit of the Americas

The 4th Summit of the Americas was held at Mar del Plata, about 400 km (250 mi) southeast of Buenos Aires in Argentina, on November 4–5, 2005.

This summit gathered together the leaders of all the countries of the American continent, except Cuba. Major security arrangements and massive popular protests against the presence of the President of the United States, George W. Bush, on Latin American soil, took place in the days leading up to the summit.

The summit was characterized for a regional opposition against the US-sponsored FTAA (Spanish: ALCA).

== Overview ==
The "Summit of the Americas" is the name for a continuing series of summits bringing together the leaders of North America and South America. The function of these summits is to foster discussion of a variety of issues affecting the western hemisphere. These high-level summit meetings have been organized by a number of multilateral bodies under the aegis of the Organization of American States. In the early 1990s, what were formerly ad hoc summits came to be institutionalized into a regular "Summits of the Americas" conference program.

- December 9–11, 1994 – 1st Summit of the Americas at Miami in the United States.
- December 7–8, 1996 – Summit of the Americas on Sustainable Development at Santa Cruz de la Sierra in Bolivia.
- April 18–19, 1998 – 2nd Summit of the Americas at Santiago in Chile.
- April 20–22, 2001 – 3rd Summit of the Americas, in Quebec City, Canada.

== Summit discussions ==
The theme of the Fourth Summits of the Americas was "Creating Jobs to Fight Poverty and Strengthen Democratic Governance". The Declaration and Plan of Action of Mar del Plata, signed by the attending heads of state and government at the conclusion of the event, was expected to deal extensively with the topic of job creation. Nevertheless, most of the deliberations concerned the Free Trade Area of the Americas.

=== The Summit of the Americas and the Free Trade Area of the Americas ===
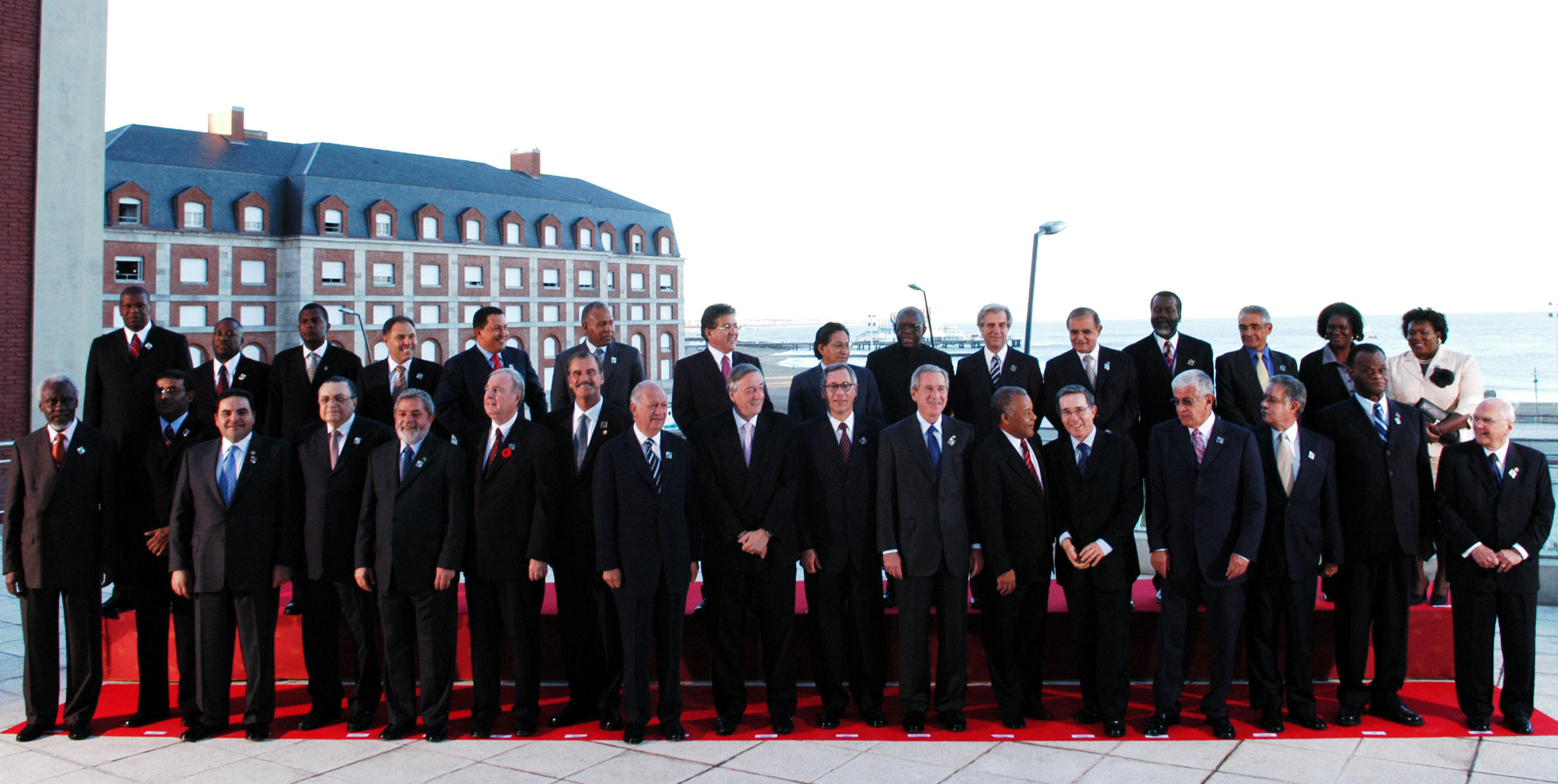
The heads of state during the Fourth Summit of the Americas 2005 in Mar del Plata, Argentina

These original objectives dealing with job creation in Latin America however quickly dissolved over a disagreement in the wording of a clause encompassing the Free Trade Area of the Americas (FTAA), with Brazil and Argentina (two countries with highly competitive agricultural industries) in particular refusing to negotiate a deal where the U.S. does not limit barriers and subsidies to the U.S. agricultural industry. Talks about the FTAA, a possible free trade zone encompassing thirty-four nations in the American Continent, began on 11 December 1994 at the first Summit of the Americas in Miami, United States. The concept of a 34-nation free trade zone, however, only came to prominence and the public consciousness seven years later at the Quebec City Summit of the Americas which was met with large protests and demonstrations by people involved in the anti-globalization movement. President Bush stated prior to the Mar del Plata Summit that the U.S. would continue to push in favor the FTAA agreement despite opposition from some left-wing governments in the region. Though President Bush acknowledged that progress on the FTAA talks had stalled, he stated that the Doha Round global trade talks aimed at securing a global trade pact by the start of 2006 had to now take priority over the FTAA stating to reporters in Washington: "The Doha round really trumps the FTAA as a priority because the Doha round not only involves our neighborhood, it involves the whole world", he said. President Bush also went on to urge the Brazilian government to put pressure on the European Union to cut its farm subsidies, a major issue in world trade negotiations.

=== Summit fails to reach a trade agreement ===
In the midst of protests from the civilian population and after US refusal to end or reduce its protectionism on agricultural markets, and opposition from the four Mercosur countries (Brazil, Argentina, Uruguay, and Paraguay) and Venezuela, which maintained that the U.S.-led proposal would damage their nations' economies, the Summit talks failed to reach an agreement on a regional trade deal. Talks continued beyond the scheduled end of the meeting as supporters of the U.S.-led proposal sought to set another date to continue negotiations. Twenty-nine of the nations at the meeting agreed to resume talks over the Free Trade Area of the Americas in 2006; the five dissenters instead proposed to wait for the results of the next World Trade Organization meeting in Hong Kong. Venezuelan President Hugo Chávez pronounced the FTAA "buried".

== Security ==
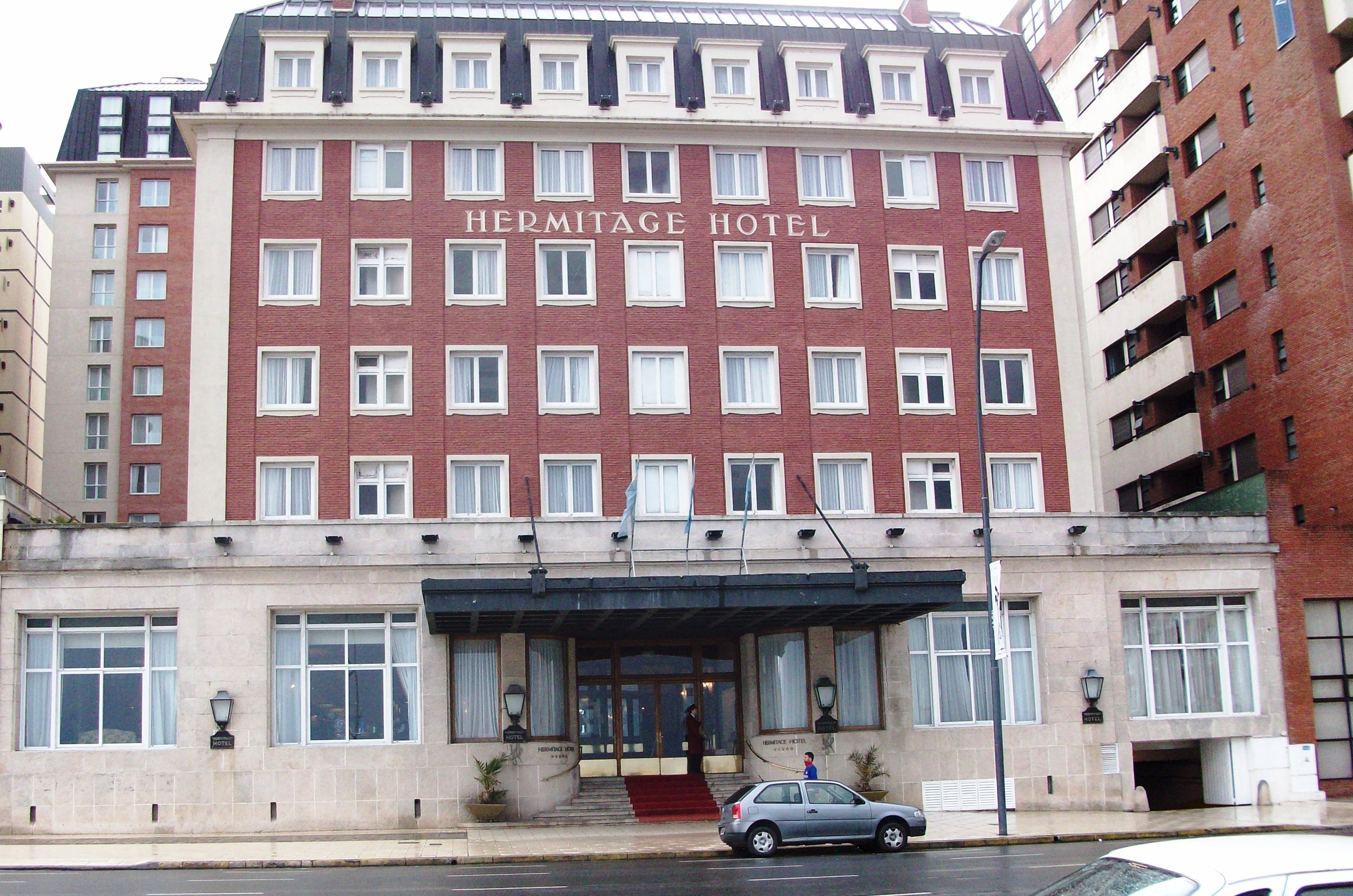
Hermitage Hotel, venue for the 2005 summit

Security for the summit included 10,000 local police and national security forces, including Federal Police, National Gendarmerie and Naval Prefecture. More than twenty streets were blockaded in the main beach district. Three concentric rings of chain-link fence were erected in the city, and residents living inside were issued special passes to be permitted in to get to their homes.

Ships belonging to the Argentine Navy were positioned offshore, while helicopters patrolled the beach area. The Argentine Air Force deployed A-4AR Fightinghawks to the nearest Tandil airbase supported by U.S. Air Force E-3 Sentry AWACS operating from Bahía Blanca. There was a one hundred mile no-fly zone in effect around the city for the duration of the summit with orders given for any planes in violation to be shot down.

== Protests against FTAA and Bush ==
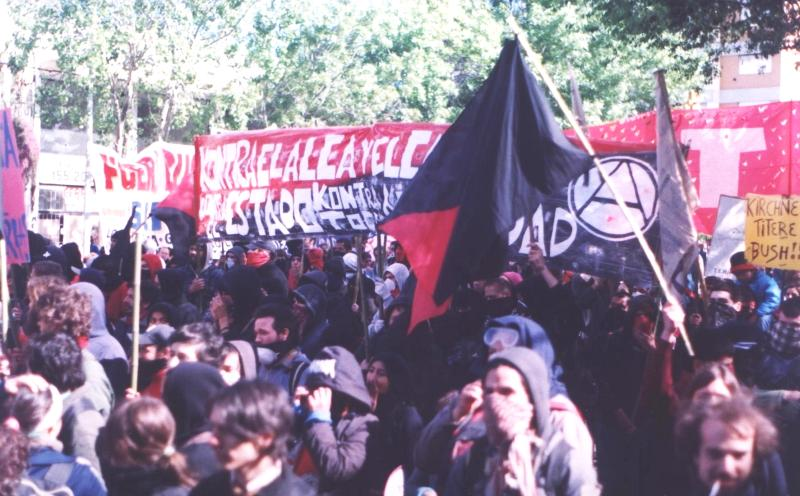
Argentinian anarchist protest during the 4th Summit of the Americas

Leading up to the summit, Bolivian presidential candidate Evo Morales, Argentine soccer legend Diego Maradona, and Cuban singer and composer Silvio Rodríguez travelled together to take part in the "Peoples' Summit" or the "American Anti-Summit", summoning Latin American activists who oppose the neoliberal "Washington Consensus", the FTAA, and U.S. President George W. Bush.

Morales, Maradona and Rodríguez were part of a group of participants who travelled aboard a train named the Expreso del Alba from Buenos Aires to Mar del Plata. Alba is an acronym for Alternativa Bolivariana para las Américas ("Bolivarian Alternative for the Americas") but is also the Spanish word for dawn. The Express was joined by road by hundreds of buses carrying members of political and social organisations, protests organizers claimed days before the summit.

The group arriving in Mar del Plata aboard the ALBA Express went to the World Cup Stadium where Venezuelan President Hugo Chávez spoke to the crowd, then joined the "peoples' march" summoned to repudiate the presence of George W. Bush in Latin America.

The march did not come close to the exclusion zone and ended peacefully. However, radical protesters (piqueteros, left-wing political parties, anarchist organisations, etc.), who opposed what they considered reformism, organized a second march in which the protests turned violent. Protesters lit fires, hurled Molotov cocktails, and set fire to a bank. Police used tear gas in an attempt to quell the violence. Unconfirmed reports indicate that there were at least twenty injured resulting from the violence. During the incident, MSNBC reported that 60 arrests had been made by 7:50 p.m. local time.

The downtown streets of Mar del Plata seemed empty and ghostlike by the time rioting had started. On MSNBC during the incident, NBC News Chief White House Correspondent David Gregory and The Washington Post reporter Michael Fletcher attributed this to the widespread anticipation among locals that the summit would bring violence. Fletcher said during the broadcast that "people (local residents and business owners) anticipated that this summit was coming, and (the locals) got out of town" and that "most businesses and shops are closed". The Washington Post journalist Michael Fletcher also suggested that the violence was an outlet for anger caused by "growing wealth discrepancies" and the "rich getting richer", problems which he says many South Americans believe have "been made worse by free trade... and government inefficiency".

== See also ==
- Summits of the Americas
- Organization of American States
- Washington Consensus
- Free Trade Area of the Americas
- Foreign relations of Argentina

== Notes ==
Preceded by 3rd Summit of the Americas	Summits of the Americas; 2005; Mar del Plata	Succeeded by 5th Summit of the Americas
