= Summit of the Americas =

Series of international summit meetings

The Summit of the Americas (SOA) are institutionalized gatherings of heads of state and government of the member states of the Western Hemisphere where leaders discuss common policy issues, affirm shared values and commit to concerted actions at the national and regional level to address continuing and new challenges faced by countries in the Americas.

Since the beginning of the Summits Process, the Heads of State and Government have established a vast array of priorities that appropriately tackles the priorities and the necessities of the people of the Hemisphere. Democracy has always been a central subject in the Summits despite the heterogeneity of Summit themes. It has been addressed according to the needs and concerns of the Member states, including the construction of a democratic hemispheric community, the preservation and strengthening of the democratic system, good governance, and the relationship between democracy and socio-economic issues.

To improve the Summit Process, the Summits Secretariat has worked actively and jointly with the OAS General Secretariat and Member States and has prepared an initial proposal for a follow-up system on the mandates of the Summits of the Americas. SISCA is a mechanism that provides Member States the tools to achieve the targets set in the mandates, in order to be measurable for the medium and long-term through a results-oriented management.

Cuba was expelled from the OAS under pressure from the United States after the Cuban Revolution of 1959. Cuba participated in the 2015 summit in Panama, and sent its foreign minister to the subsequent 2018 summit in Peru. In the early 1990s, the formerly ad hoc summits were institutionalized into a regular "Summit of the Americas" based on the principles of democracy and free trade. The meetings, organized by a number of multilateral bodies led by the OAS, provide an opportunity for discussions about a variety of issues and topics.

The last summit to take place was the 9th Summit of the Americas in Los Angeles, United States, from June 8–10, 2022.

== History ==
=== List of summits ===
Summit	Dates	Host country	Host city	Topics	Results
1st	December 9–11, 1994	United States	Miami	Prosperity; Sustainable Development; Economic Integration; Poverty Eradication; Environmental Protections; Democratic Governance	Declaration of Principles; Plan of Action
Special	December 7-8, 1996	Bolivia	Santa Cruz	Health; Education; Sustainable Agriculture; Forestation; Sustainable cities and communities; Democratic Governance	
2nd	April 18–19, 1998	Chile	Santiago	Democracy; Justice; Human Rights; Free Trade in the Americas; Democratic Governance	
3rd	April 20–22, 2001	Canada	Quebec City	Hemispheric Security; Civil Society; Gender Equality; Indigenous peoples; Children and youth; Democratic Governance	
Special	January 12–13, 2004	Mexico	Monterrey	Addressing poverty; Social development; Equitable economic growth; Democratic Governance	Nuevo León Declaration
4th	November 4–5, 2005	Argentina	Mar del Plata	Job creation; Decent employment opportunities; Democratic Governance	
5th	April 17–19, 2009	Trinidad and Tobago	Port-of-Spain	Prosperity; Energy security; Environmental sustainability; Public security; Democratic governance	Declaration of Commitment of Port of Spain
6th	April 14–15, 2012	Colombia	Cartagena	Infrastructure; Poverty, inequality, inequity; Natural disaster risks; Access to technology; Citizen security; Democratic governance	
7th	April 10–11, 2015	Panama	Panama City	Education; Health; Energy; Environment; Migration; Security; Democratic Governance	
8th	April 13–14, 2018	Peru	Lima	Corruption; Democratic Governance	Lima Commitment on Democratic Governance against Corruption
9th	June 6–10, 2022	United States	Los Angeles	Health; Digital Transformation; Clean Energy; Environment; Democratic Governance; Migration	Los Angeles Declaration on Migration and Protection
10th	2026	Dominican Republic	Punta Cana		

The events that garnered the most general public and media attention were the Quebec City and Mar del Plata summits (3rd and 4th respectively), both of which provoked very large anti-globalization and anti-Free Trade Area of the Americas protests and attendant police response.

== Summit of the Americas Secretariat ==
The Summit of the Americas Secretariat forms part of the institutional mechanism of the Summits of the Americas Process and provides support in the areas of planning, implementation, outreach, and follow up of Summit mandates.

In the First Summit of the Americas, held in Miami, United States, in 1994, several international organizations contributed documents and suggestions that were considered by the coordinators and participants of the Summit. At the OAS, the Permanent Council, with the Secretary General, César Gaviria, attended the Summit and talked about the importance of this event for Inter-American relations and for building trust amongst the countries and institutions of the Inter-American system.

Later, the OAS had an essential role in the preparation and execution of the Summit on Sustainable Development held in Santa Cruz de la Sierra, Bolivia, in 1996. The negotiation meetings on the Declaration and Plan of Action were held at OAS headquarters, with the support from the OAS as technical secretariat.

The OAS played an active role in preparing for the Second Summit of the Americas which took place in Santiago, Chile, in 1998. The OAS offered technical support for the organization of the preparatory meetings in several thematic areas such as education, science and technology, public participation, and drugs, among others. The OAS was mandated with keeping "the institutional memory of the Summit Process and provide technical support to the Summit Implementation Review Group (SIRG)". As a result, the Secretary General created the Office of Summit Follow Up (OSFU) in 1998.

The Third Summit of the Americas, held in Quebec City, Canada, in 2001, recognized the central role of the OAS in the support of this process. The Office of Summit Follow up was in charge of the management of documents through the Summit website and organized the negotiation meetings with the government of Canada. In Quebec, the OAS Secretary General signed Executive Order Number 02-03 on May 31, 2002, which strengthened the responsibilities of the Office of Summit Follow Up and changed its name to the Secretariat for the Summit Process. The Order also specified the Secretariat's responsibility to coordinate activities concerning civil society participation in the Summit Process. New duties also included presiding over the Joint Summit Working Group.

In the Special Summit of the Americas, held in Monterrey, Mexico, in January 2004, governments signed the Declaration of Nuevo León. The governments called for the organizations of the Inter-American system to provide in-depth support and assistance in the preparation for the Fourth Summit of the Americas.

The Summits of the Americas Secretariat played a fundamental role in preparing for the Fourth Summit of the Americas, held in Mar del Plata, Argentina, in November 2005. At this Summit, the Heads of State and Government gathered to discuss the theme: "Creating Jobs to Confront Poverty and Strengthen Democratic Governance." In the Plan of Action of Mar del Plata, the institutions of the JSWG were called to perform specific tasks in order to achieve the objectives in terms of growth and democratic governance in the region.

During the Fifth Summit of the Americas, held in Trinidad and Tobago from April 17 to 19, 2009, the Heads of State and Government embarked upon a new era of inter-American relations. The Summit focused on securing citizens' future by promoting human prosperity, energy security and environmental sustainability, underlying th importance of a process that began in 1994.

The Sixth Summit of the Americas was held in Cartagena de Indias, Colombia, on April 14–15, 2012, and its mandates focused on the integration of physical infrastructure in the Americas, solving poverty, inequality and inequity, disaster risk reduction and management, access to and use of information and communication technologies, and the implementation of policies for citizen security and the prevention of transnational organized crime.

The Seventh Summit of the Americas was held in Panama City, Panama, on April 10–11, 2015.

The Eighth Summit of the Americas (Lima, April 13-14, 2018) was held under the leadership of the government of Peru. The Lima Commitment: "Democratic Governance against Corruption" was the first document of mandates adopted by Heads of State and Government at a Summit of the Americas since the Fourth Summit held in Mar del Plata, Argentina (2005).

The Ninth Summit of the Americas was held in Los Angeles, United States, on June 6-8, 2022, during times of recovery from the COVID-19 pandemic. The Heads of State and Government adopted five documents of mandates on health and resilience, democratic governance, energy transition, green future, and digital transformation.

== Actors involved in the summit process ==
=== Participating states ===
The heads of state and government of 35 states have participated throughout the history of the Summit of the Americas process.

- Antigua and Barbuda
- Argentina
- Bahamas
- Barbados
- Belize
- Bolivia
- Brazil
- Canada
- Chile
- Colombia
- Costa Rica
- Cuba*
- Dominica
- Dominican Republic
- Ecuador
- El Salvador
- Grenada
- Guatemala
- Guyana
- Haiti
- Honduras
- Jamaica
- Mexico
- Nicaragua**
- Panama
- Paraguay
- Peru
- Saint Kitts and Nevis
- Saint Vincent and the Grenadines
- Saint Lucia
- Suriname
- Trinidad and Tobago
- United States of America
- Uruguay
- Venezuela***

* Cuba was invited to participate in the VII Summit in Panama and the VIII Summit in Lima, Peru.

** Nicaragua was not invited to participate in the IX Summit in Los Angeles.

*** Venezuela was not invited to participate in the VIII Summit in Lima or the IX Summit in Los Angeles.

=== Summit Implementation Review Group (SIRG) ===
The Summit Implementation Review Group (SIRG), is the core management body of the Summits Process and is composed of government officials of the countries of the hemisphere, which are represented in the SIRG by their appointed National Coordinators.

The SIRG was created in 1995 and is presided over by the Chair of the Summit of the Americas Process. The Dominican Republic as the host of the 10th Summit, to be held in 2025, is the current chair of the SIRG.

The SIRG meets on average 3 times a year, with at least one meeting held at the Ministerial level. The SIRG is responsible for reporting annually to the Foreign Ministers on progress achieved in fulfilling Summit Mandates.

At the Quebec Summit in 2001, the SIRG and its Executive Council were charged with the responsibility of following-up, together with the support of the OAS Office of Summit Follow Up, which became the Secretariat of the Summit Process.

=== Joint Summit Working Group (JSWG) ===
The Joint Summit Working Group (JSWG) coordinates the support of thirteen Inter-American and international institutions to the Summits Process. These institutions provide technical guidance to countries in the identification and negotiation of issues addressed in the Summits process.

The JSWG also plans and carries out projects and initiatives to implement Summit commitments and supports Inter-American ministerial meetings and their linkages to the Summits process. The JSWG also participates in Summit policy dialogues to exchange ideas regarding policy approaches for the Summits process.

The JSWG is chaired by the OAS Summit of the Americas Secretariat. The following institutions are members of the JSWG:

- Organization of American States, Summit of the Americas Secretariat
- Pan American Health Organization (PAHO)
- Inter-American Institute for Cooperation on Agriculture (IICA)
- Inter-American Development Bank (IDB)
- Economic Commission for Latin America and the Caribbean (ECLAC)
- Central American Bank for Economic Integration (CABEI)
- Development Bank of Latin America and the Caribbean (CAF)
- The World Bank
- Caribbean Development Bank (CDB)
- International Organization for Migration (IOM)
- International Labour Organization (ILO)
- United Nations Development Programme (UNDP)
- Organisation for Economic Co-operation and Development (OECD)

=== Social actors ===
Civil society organizations, indigenous peoples, youth, private sector, labor unions and other social actors play an essential role in the Summits Process. They provide recommendation on the thematic areas to the Member States in preparation for future Summits and assist in the implementation of initiatives in the development of the hemispheric agenda.

At previous Summits, the Heads of State and Government recognized the importance of including social actors and encouraged governments to cooperate with social actors in the formulation and implementation of development policies and programs.
