= 8th Summit of the Americas =

8th Summit of the Americas VIII Cumbre de las Américas
- Host country: Peru
- Date: April 13–14, 2018
- Cities: Lima
- Follows: 7th Summit of the Americas
- Precedes: 9th Summit of the Americas

The eighth Summit of the Americas was held in Lima, Peru, from April 13–14, 2018. The main focus of the summit was anti-corruption following the outbreak of the Odebrecht scandal, which affected numerous countries in the region, while attention was also put upon the crisis in Venezuela.

== Background ==
The 2015 Summit of the Americas in Panama was held in a positive atmosphere, largely thanks to Barack Obama's normalization of relations with Cuba, which was welcomed by the rest of the Western Hemisphere as a long-overdue rectification of a Cold War relic, considering that Latin American leaders, especially those in Bolivia and Venezuela, warned at the 2012 Summit of the Americas in Cartagena, Colombia, that the holding the 2015 summit was impossible without Cuba's participation.

However, Donald Trump in June 2017 announced a reinvigorated hardline towards Cuba by banning U.S. business transactions with Cuban companies run by the Cuban Revolutionary Armed Forces and imposing some restrictions on Americans' travel to Cuba (banning Americans from visiting military-run establishments). He has also imposed economic sanctions against Venezuela, arguing President Nicolas Maduro's disrespect for his country's democratic institutions.

On February 13, 2018, Peru revoked Venezuela's invitation to the Summit because of Maduro's plan to hold an early presidential election, as the major opposing parties were banned from it. Maduro insisted that he would attend the summit anyway, but eventually declined from doing so on April 10. Delsa Solórzano would represent Venezuela in the summit instead. Solórzano is a deputy and the Vice President of A New Era, an opposition political party. On April 10, 2018, U.S. President Donald Trump stated he would not attend the Summit in order to focus on the fallout of the Douma chemical attack. Vice President Mike Pence attended in his place.

== Events ==
=== 13 April ===
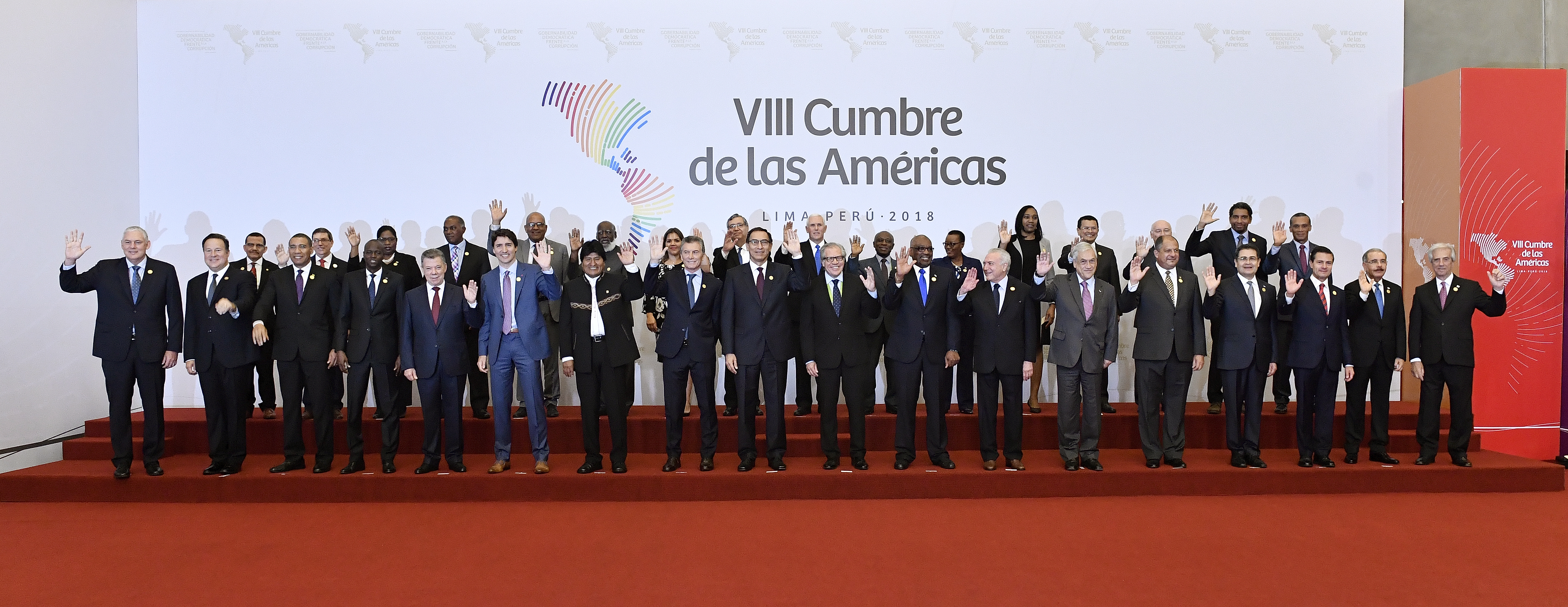
Representatives gathered on April 14, 2018

The President of Ecuador Lenín Moreno visited Peru, but left a short time before the summit could start. A hostage crisis at the Colombian border caused the suspected death of two journalists, and he announced that he would take military action unless the captors proved otherwise within a 12-hours time frame.

U.S. Vice President Mike Pence announced that the United States Department of State and United States Agency for International Development would provide $16 million to the United Nations High Commissioner for Refugees to fund aid for Venezuelan refugees in Brazil and Colombia affected during the Venezuelan refugee crisis.

=== 14 April ===
Many of the countries present at the summit condemned the Bolivarian Government of Venezuela, specifically embattled President Nicolás Maduro, and made statements rejecting the recognition of upcoming presidential elections. Vice President of the United States Mike Pence stated, "Every free nation gathered here must take action to isolate the Maduro regime. We must all stand with our brothers and sisters suffering in Venezuela", blaming Cuba for creating and defending corrupt governments in Latin America. Venezuela's allies Bolivia and Cuba defended President Maduro, criticizing his ban from the summit. Foreign Minister of Cuba Bruno Rodríguez Parrilla called the United States a racist country while also criticizing the bombings of Damascus and Homs and the gun politics in the United States.

Countries also signed the "Lima Commitment" to agree on methods of combatting corruption in the region, with the proposal to create multi-national mechanisms of cooperation and anti-graft laws. Some countries such as Bolivia stated that the document would be used to "topple legitimate governments", comparing it to the war on drugs, with Bolivian president Evo Morales stating that the United States was the "main threat against democracy, against peace, against freedom".

== Delegation leaders ==
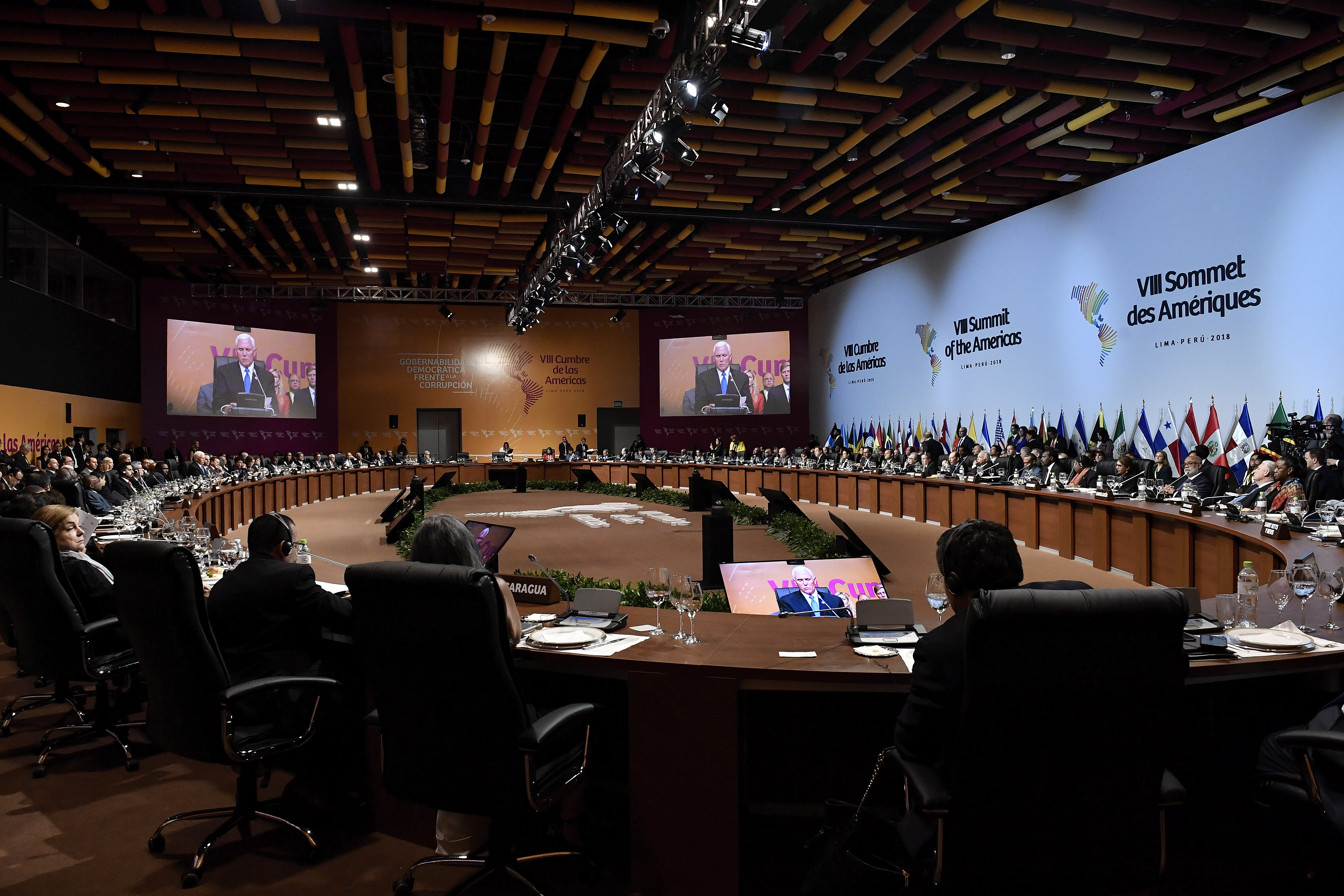
Opening meeting

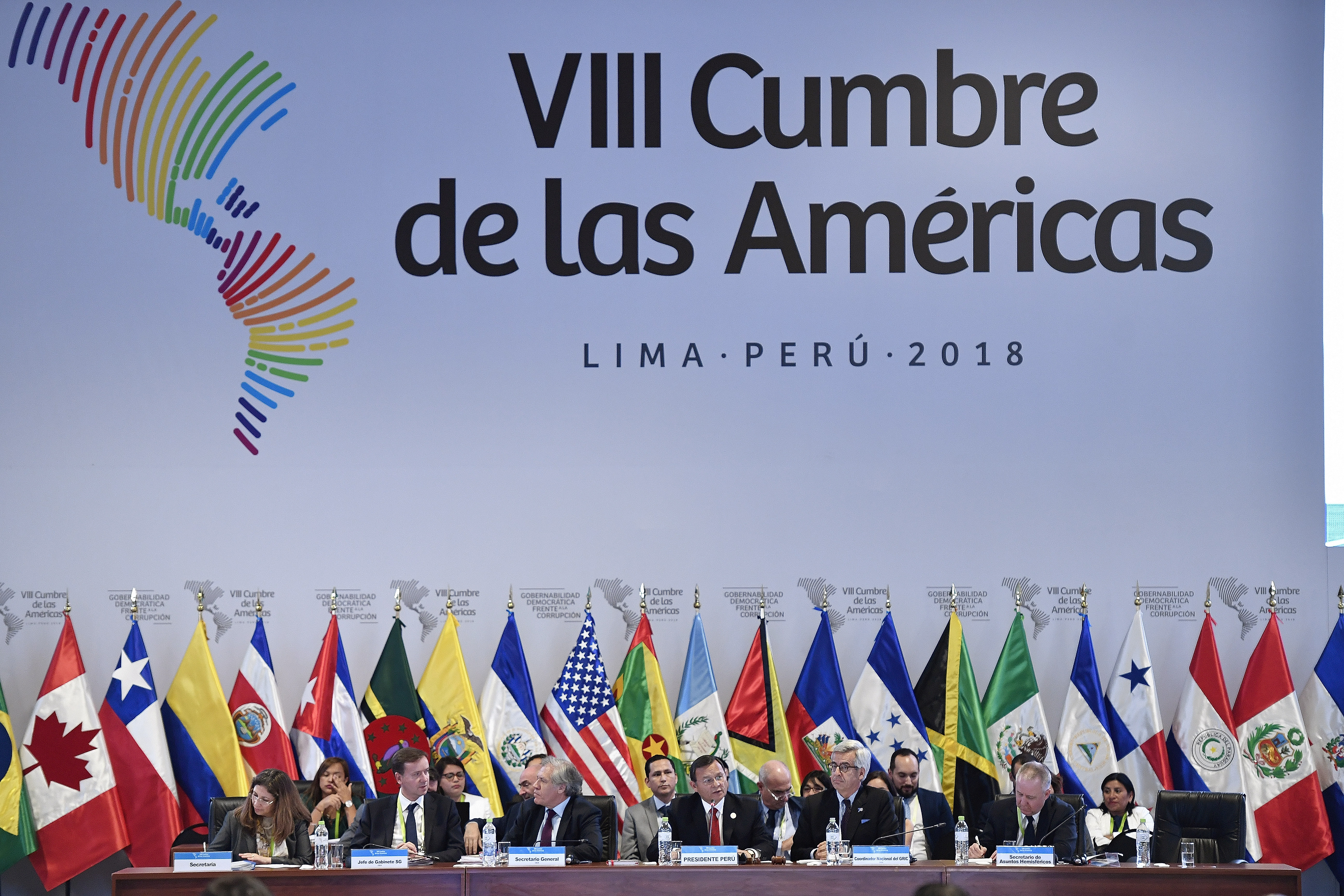
Central meeting room, April 14

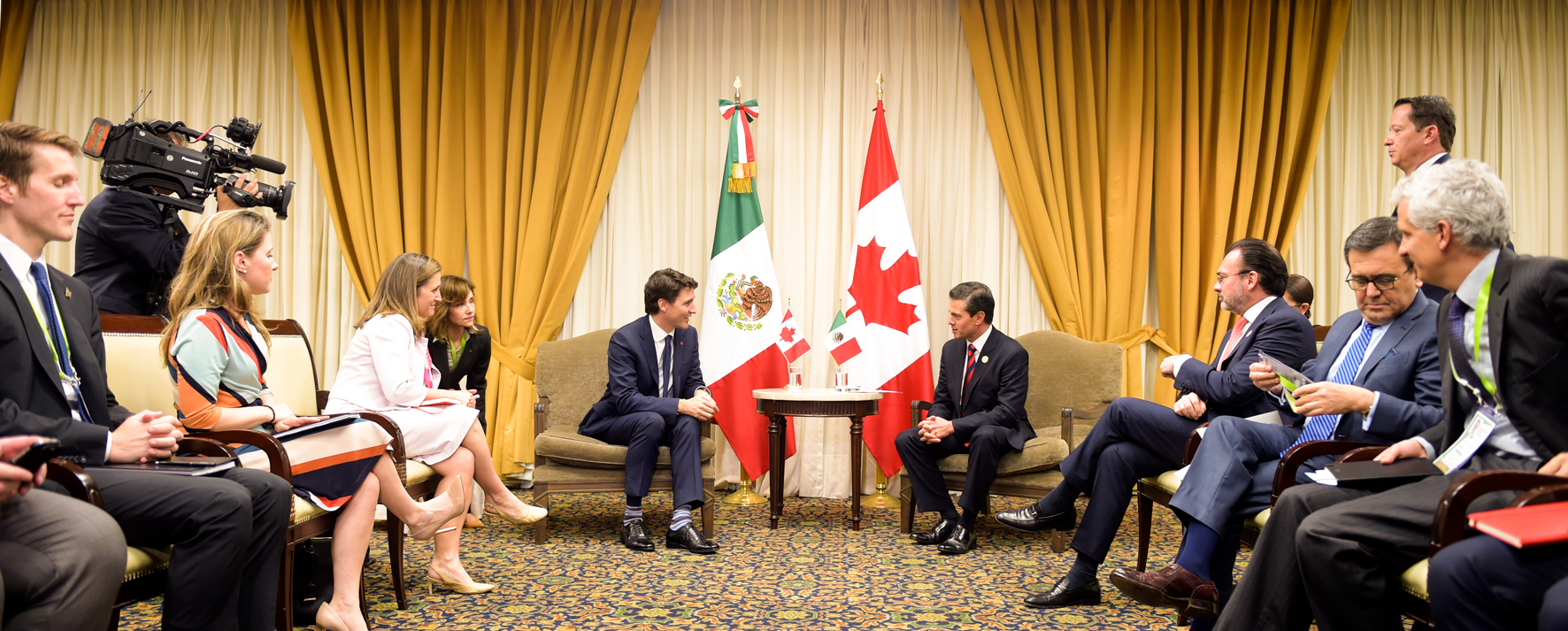
Canadian Prime Minister Justin Trudeau meeting with Mexican President Enrique Peña Nieto

Summary of attending leaders
Country	Delegation leader
Antigua and Barbuda	Prime Minister Gaston Browne
Argentina	President Mauricio Macri
Bahamas	Prime Minister Hubert Minnis
Barbados	Prime Minister Freundel Stuart
Belize	Prime Minister Dean Barrow
Bolivia	President Evo Morales
Brazil	President Michel Temer
Canada	Prime Minister Justin Trudeau
Chile	President Sebastián Piñera
Colombia	President Juan Manuel Santos
Costa Rica	President Luis Guillermo Solís
Cuba	Foreign Minister Bruno Rodriguez
Dominica	Prime Minister Roosevelt Skerrit
Dominican Republic	President Danilo Medina
Ecuador	President Lenín Moreno
El Salvador	Foreign Minister Hugo Martínez
Grenada	Prime Minister Keith Mitchell
Guatemala	Vice President Jafeth Cabrera
Guyana	President David A. Granger
Haiti	President Jovenel Moïse
Honduras	President Juan Orlando Hernández
Jamaica	Prime Minister Andrew Holness
Mexico	President Enrique Peña Nieto
Nicaragua	President Daniel Ortega
Panama	President Juan Carlos Varela
Paraguay	President Horacio Cartes
Peru	President Martín Vizcarra
Saint Kitts and Nevis	Prime Minister Timothy Harris
Saint Lucia	Prime Minister Allen Chastanet
Saint Vincent and the Grenadines	Prime Minister Ralph Gonsalves
Suriname	President Dési Bouterse
Trinidad and Tobago	Prime Minister Keith Rowley
United States	Vice President Mike Pence
Uruguay	President Tabaré Vázquez
Venezuela	Deputy Delsa Solórzano

Preceded by 7th Summit of the Americas	Summits of the Americas; 2018; Lima, Peru	Succeeded by 9th Summit of the Americas
