= 7th Summit of the Americas =

7th Summit of the Americas VII Cumbre de las Américas

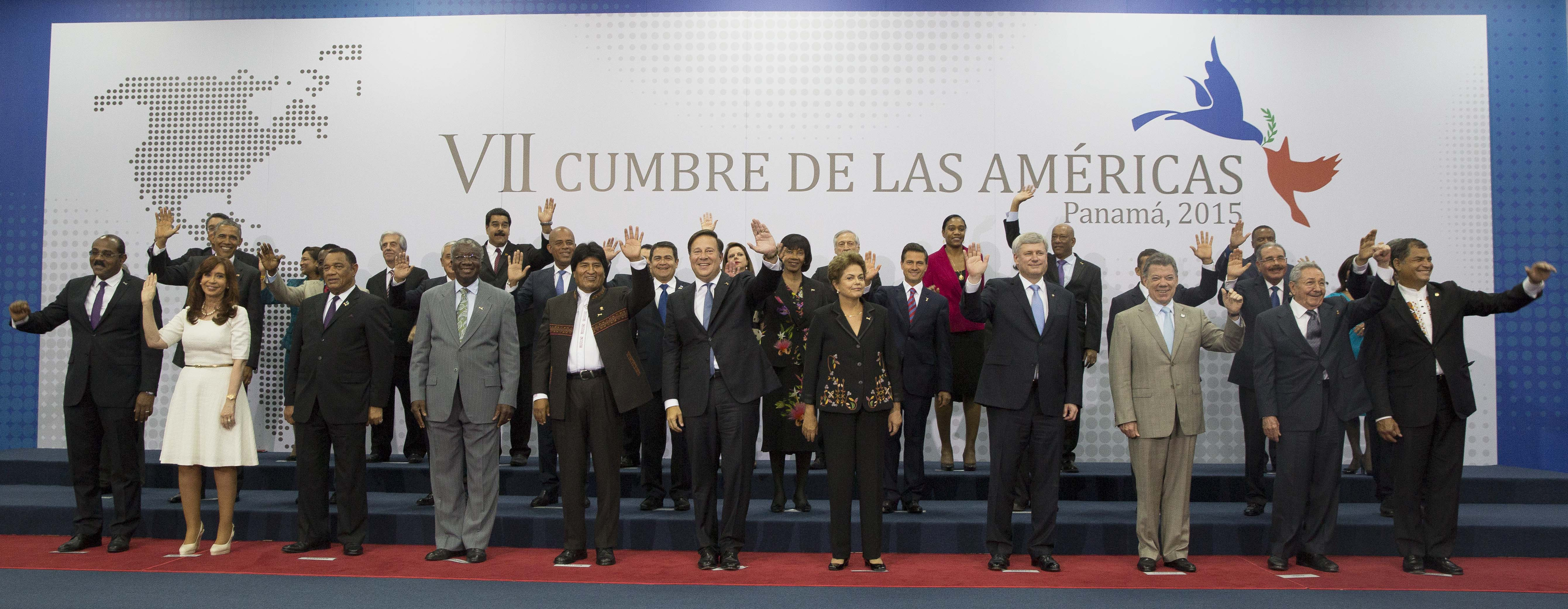
- Family photograph
- Host country: Panama
- Date: April 10–11, 2015
- Cities: Panama City
- Follows: 6th Summit of the Americas
- Precedes: 8th Summit of the Americas

The seventh Summit of the Americas was held at Panama City, Panama, on April 10 – 11, 2015.

== Background ==
The Summits of the Americas are a continuing series of summits bringing together the leaders of the Americas including North America (which includes Central America and the Caribbean) and South America. The function of these summits is to foster discussion of a variety of issues affecting the western hemisphere under the aegis of the Organization of American States. In the early 1990s, what were formerly ad hoc summits came to be institutionalised into a regular "Summits of the Americas" conference programme.

At the 6th Summit of the Americas numerous leaders across the political spectrum said that the next summit must include Cuba. The ALBA states also added that they would boycott a summit without Cuba's presence. A final declaration at the summit was also held up over the issue of Cuba.

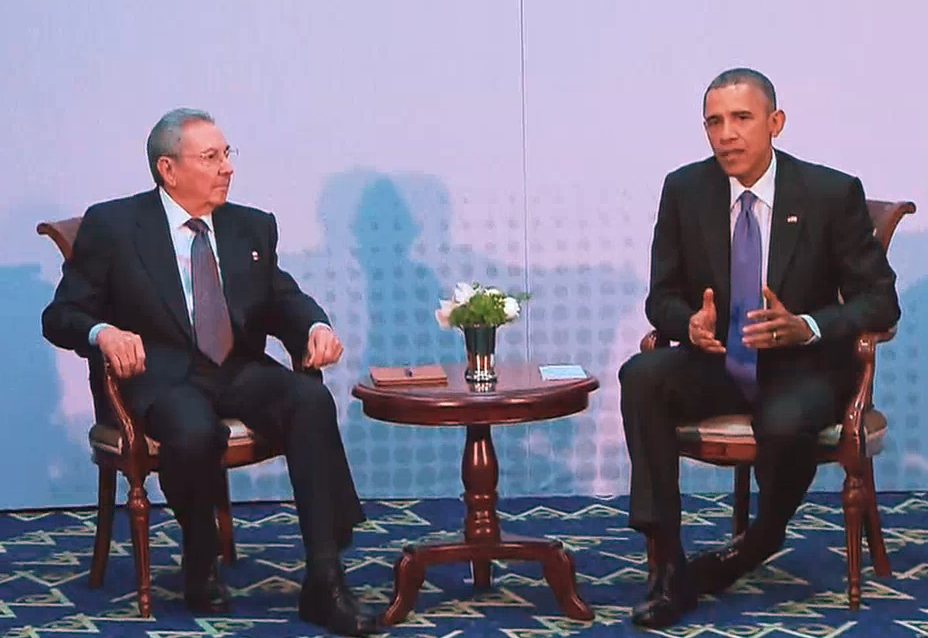
Meeting between Raúl Castro and Barack Obama in Panama, April 2015.

== Cuban presence at the summit ==
Cuba, along with the United States, attended the seventh Summit of the Americas in Panama. Given the pledge by ALBA member states to boycott the summit if Cuba was not invited, political controversy brewed as it transpired that Panama's government issued an invitation to the Summit. State Department spokesman Jen Psaki implicitly cautioned that Cuba's attendance of the summit would make a mockery of the spirit of the Inter-American Democratic Charter. For their part, Cuban-American senators Bob Menendez and Marco Rubio urged Panama to withdraw the invitation for Cuba to attend the summit, insisting that the move could be a slap in the face to the principles of the Inter-American Democratic Charter. However, another State Department official hinted that the US would tacitly welcome Cuba's participation in the 2015 Summit of the Americas. Following the announcement on December 17, 2014 of a shift towards normalization of relations with Cuba, the US Government dropped its objections to Cuba's presence while calling for the participation of Cuban civil society groups. Before the summit, the daughter of Oswaldo Payá, Rosa Maria Payá, was detained upon arriving at an airport in Panama; a second activist from Argentina also said they were detained.

The summit had an anti-American tone, according to the Associated Press.

== Parallel events ==
While the Summit of the Americas occurred in Panama, other events were held; one was attended by former American President Bill Clinton, and another was held in Panama City at the Florida International University campus.

Another summit called the Summit of the Peoples (Cumbre de los Pueblos), which was held at University of Panama on April 9–11, 2015 with the participation of trade unions, organizations of farmers, indigenous people, students, human rights activists, environmentalists, and feminists among others. At some parts of this event there also attended President of Bolivia Evo Morales, President of Ecuador Rafael Correa and President of Venezuela Nicolás Maduro.

== Heads of State and Government ==
Summary of Leaders
| Flag and Country | Head of State / Government |
|---|---|
| Antigua and Barbuda | Prime Minister Gaston Browne |
| Argentina | President Cristina Fernández de Kirchner |
| Bahamas | Prime Minister Perry Christie |
| Barbados | Prime Minister Freundel Stuart |
| Belize | Prime Minister Dean Barrow |
| Bolivia | President Evo Morales |
| Brazil | President Dilma Rousseff |
| Canada | Prime Minister Stephen Harper |
| Chile | Chancellor Heraldo Muñoz |
| Colombia | President Juan Manuel Santos |
| Costa Rica | President Luis Guillermo Solís |
| Cuba | President Raúl Castro |
| Dominica | Prime Minister Roosevelt Skerrit |
| Dominican Republic | President Danilo Medina |
| Ecuador | President Rafael Correa |
| El Salvador | President Salvador Sánchez Cerén |
| Grenada | Prime Minister Keith Mitchell |
| Guatemala | President Otto Pérez Molina |
| Guyana | President Donald Ramotar |
| Haiti | President Michel Joseph Martelly |
| Honduras | President Juan Orlando Hernández |
| Jamaica | Prime Minister Portia Simpson Miller |
| Mexico | President Enrique Peña Nieto |
| Nicaragua | President Daniel Ortega |
| Panama | President Juan Carlos Varela |
| Paraguay | President Horacio Cartes |
| Peru | President Ollanta Humala |
| Saint Kitts and Nevis | Prime Minister Timothy Harris |
| Saint Lucia | Prime Minister Kenny Anthony |
| Saint Vincent and the Grenadines | Prime Minister Ralph Gonsalves |
| Suriname | President Dési Bouterse |
| Trinidad and Tobago | Prime Minister Kamla Persad-Bissessar |
| United States of America | President Barack Obama |
| Uruguay | President Tabaré Vázquez |
| Venezuela | President Nicolás Maduro |

| Preceded by 6th Summit of the Americas | Summits of the Americas; 2015; Panama City, Panama | Succeeded by 8th Summit of the Americas |
