= 2001 Quebec protests =

2001 Quebec City FTAA Protests
- Part of Anti-globalization movement
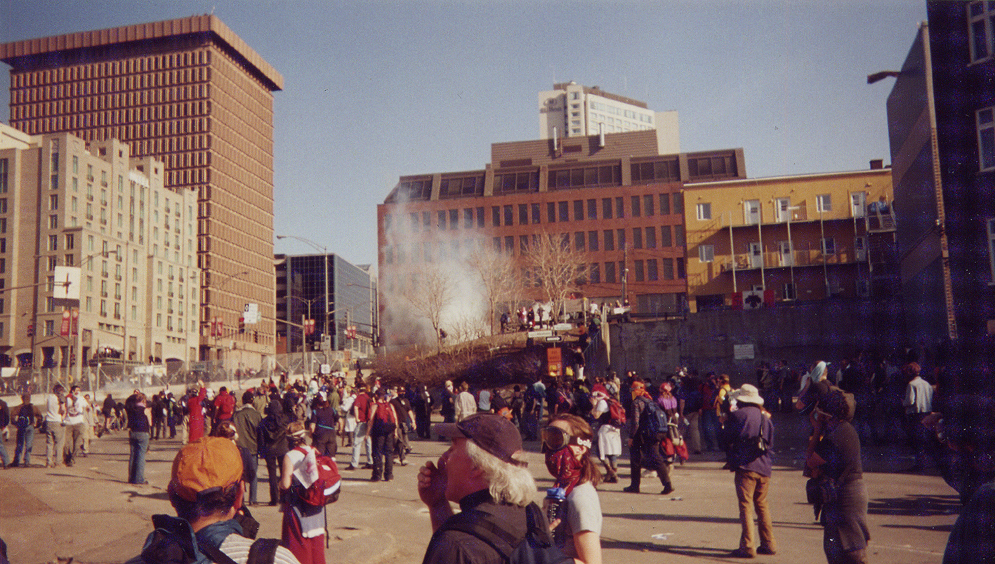
- Tear gas thrown at protesters on 21 April 2001 near the security wall encircling the meeting site
- Date: April 20, 2001 – April 22, 2001
- Location: Quebec, Canada
- Caused by: 3rd Summit of the Americas
- Goals: Ban on summits and an end to the 3rd Summit of the Americas
- Methods: Demonstrations; riots
- Result: Protests suppressed by force

The 2001 Quebec City FTAA Protests were a series of popular civil protests and riots against the 3rd Summit of the Americas, from April 20 to 22 in Quebec City, Canada. Mass protests were met with tear gas and concussion grenades were thrown by police, who claimed demonstrators were storming buildings. Protests ceased on 22 April.

== Background ==
The province of Quebec is known for its history of protest movements, including its movement for independence from Canada. Quebec had seen harsh police repression and police brutality during previous protests such as the G20 Protest in Montreal in October 2000, and the 2000 Youth Summit in Quebec City. In 1968, 1974, 1986 and 1996, protest movements occurred throughout Quebec. Protesters marched for their rights and an end of the 3rd Summit of the Americas.

== Protests ==
Police claimed that their actions were justified in protecting delegates from "red-zone" attempts to break through the fence, as well as to violent protesters destroying property and attacking the police and the media.

Many protesters accused the police of excessive force, claiming that the police's abundant use of tear gas and rubber bullets was both completely disproportionate to the scale of violence, and primarily directed at unarmed, peaceful demonstrators with dispersal of violent protesters an afterthought. A number of protesters were severely injured by rubber bullets; also, tear gas canisters were fired directly at protesters on numerous occasions, in violation of the protocols governing their use. They also criticized the actions of prison authorities. Altogether, the anti-globalization movement described the actions of the police in Quebec City as an attempt to suppress dissent.

== See also ==
- 2012 Quebec student protests
