= 3rd Summit of the Americas =

2001 international summit in Quebec City, Canada

- Logo
- Host country: Canada
- Date: April 20–22, 2001
- Follows: 2nd Summit of the Americas
- Precedes: 4th Summit of the Americas

The 3rd Summit of the Americas was a summit held in Quebec City, Quebec, Canada, on April 20–22, 2001.

This international meeting was a round of negotiations regarding a proposed Free Trade Area of the Americas. The talks are perhaps better known for the security preparations and demonstrations (known as the Quebec City protest) that surrounded them than for the progress of the negotiations.

== Overview ==
The "Summits of the Americas" is the name for a continuing series of summits bringing together the leaders of North America and South America. The function of these summits is to foster discussion of a variety of issues affecting the western hemisphere. These high-level summit meetings have been organized by a number of multilateral bodies under the aegis of the Organization of American States. In the early 1990s, what were formerly ad hoc summits came to be institutionalized into a regular "Summits of the Americas" conference program.

- December 9–11, 1994 – 1st Summit of the Americas at Miami in the United States.
- December 7–8, 1996 – Summit of the Americas on Sustainable Development at Santa Cruz de la Sierra in Bolivia.
- April 18–19, 1998 – 2nd Summit of the Americas at Santiago in Chile.

== Progress of the negotiations ==
The talks were the third in the negotiation process for the FTAA. 34 heads of state and government met in Quebec City, representing all the countries of North and South America, except Cuba. Partially due to resistance from the leaders of some poorer countries, no deal was reached in Quebec City.

The participants did make a statement titled "The Declaration of Quebec City" which includes the quotation: "We, the democratically elected Heads of State and Government of the Americas, have met in Quebec City at our Third Summit, to renew our commitment to hemispheric integration."

== Security and public response ==
=== Preparations ===
From the beginning, the authorities indicated their intent to use very intensive security measures to restrict the ability of anti- and alter-globalization movement protesters to approach the area where the summit was to take place, in light of the well-known previous incidents in Seattle (November 30, 1999), Prague (September 26, 2000), and Montreal (November 20, 2000).

The most controversial of these preparations was the construction of a 3-metre high concrete and wire fence around a large section of La Colline Parlementaire that encircled the meeting site, the National Assembly and many government and residential buildings. Only residents, summit delegates and certain accredited journalists were allowed inside. Businesses and churches within the area were not permitted to open.

The Royal Canadian Mounted Police, in collaboration with the Canadian Forces, the Canadian Security Intelligence Service, Sûreté du Québec and local municipal police forces provided security.

=== Protests ===
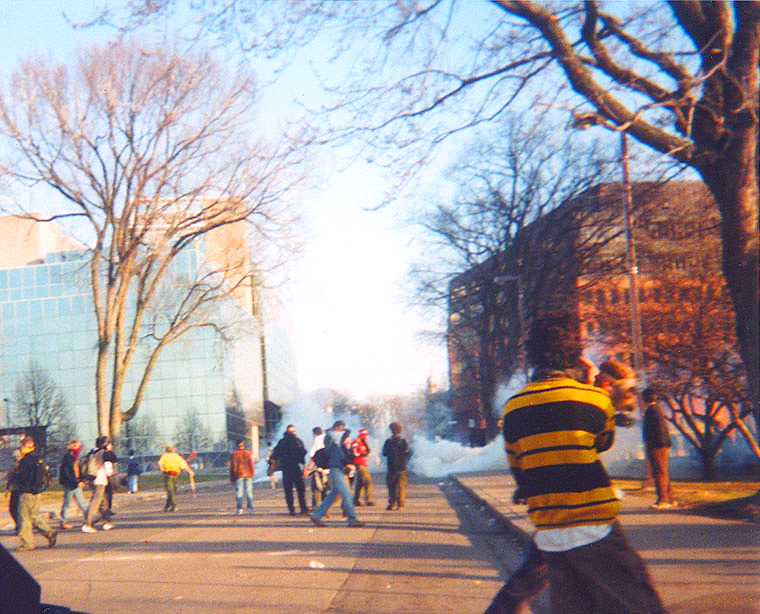
Tear gas thrown at protesters on 21 April 2001 in Quebec's Haute-Ville

The Quebec City protests (called A20) were one of the largest anti-globalization demonstrations to that point, attracting some 20,000 protesters from throughout the Americas. Groups represented at the protest included trade unions, civil society groups such as Greenpeace and the Council of Canadians, New Democratic Party and Parti Québécois caucuses, and a great many groups from faith communities, universities and colleges.

In addition to the political concerns of the anti-globalization movement, many focused their attention on the division of the city with the security barrier, and what they saw as the draconic nature of police responses.

Protesters began to arrive on Friday, April 20, many being hosted at Université Laval, college campuses, and churches. A number of clashes with police took place on Friday afternoon, with the first perimeter breach on Boulevard René-Lévesque Est, less than 5 minutes after the protesters arrived at the site, and in the evening. Many peaceful gatherings, including a vegan supper and concert underneath the Dufferin-Montmorency Autoroute, also took place.

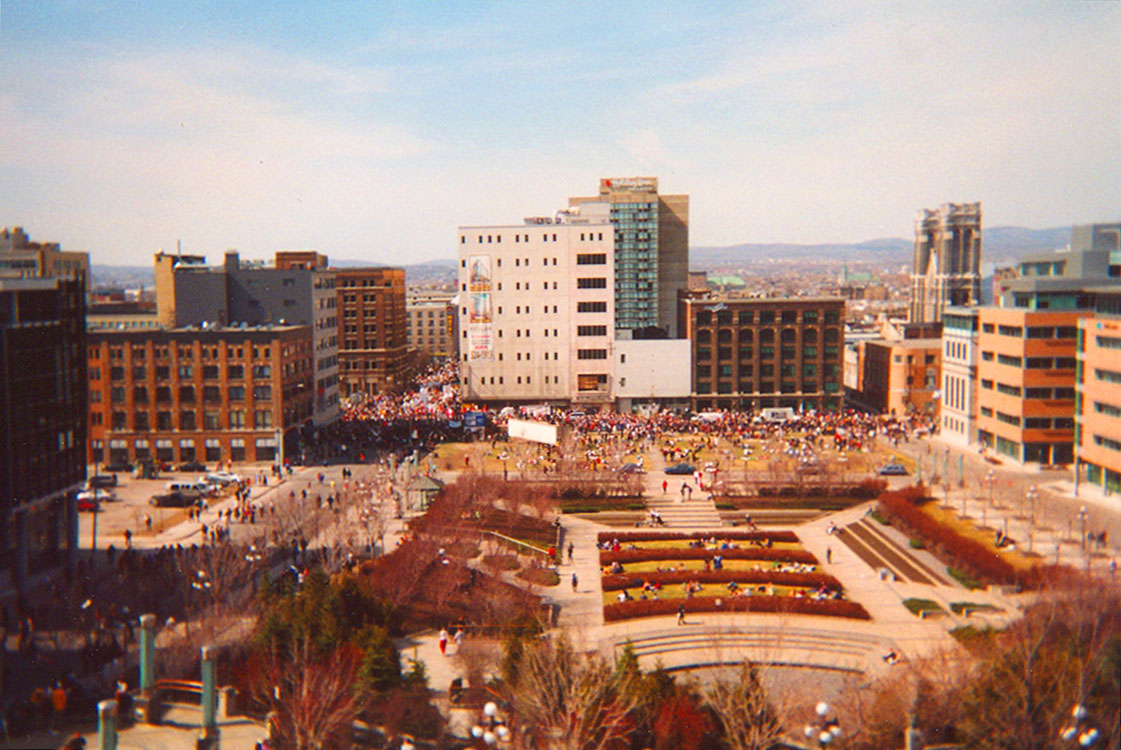
Protesters fill Quebec City's Basse-Ville around Jardin de Saint-Roch (now called Jardin Jean-Paul-L'Allier) during the Summit of the Americas in April 2001.

The primary day of protests was Friday, April 20. It began with the Second Peoples' Summit of the Americas, an educational and political gathering near the Gare du Palais, in the lower city east of the summit site. From there, the protesters marched northwest along Boulevard Charest towards Rue de la Couronne. The number of people marching has been estimated at anywhere from 50,000 to 150,000.

Protests were divided into three classes: "green zone," being legal protests with no risk of arrest; "yellow zone," peaceful, unsanctioned protest with some risk of arrest or confrontation with police, and "red zone," being direct acts of civil disobedience carrying a high risk of arrest. This innovative division was developed after the G-20 protest in Montreal in October 2000, which though meant to be peaceful suffered from sporadic violence. A number of riot police on horseback were used to disperse the violent protestors. The zone system was meant to protect those who do not wish to run the risk of arrest or of police violence.

At Rue de la Couronne, the protest march split, with the majority of protesters (the green zone) heading north, towards a main rally at the Colisée.

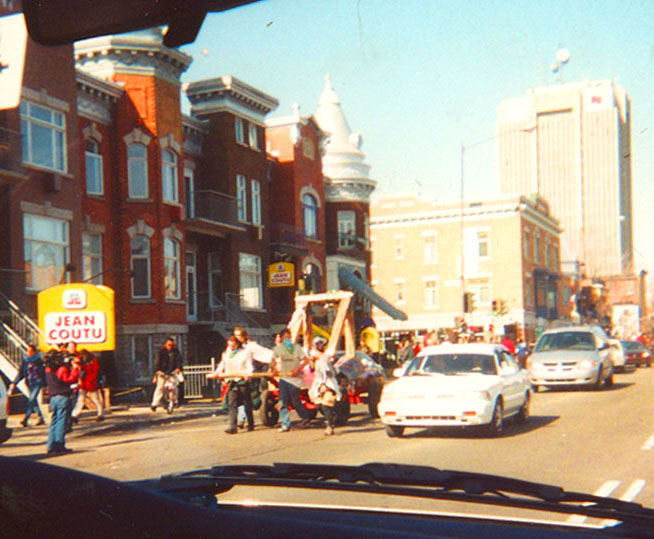
The mock catapult used by a group of protesters to throw teddy bears

Protesters favouring the yellow or red zones headed south, towards Cap Diamant. Many spread out through the Saint-Jean Baptiste area north of and below the fence; others marched along the edge of the mountain on Côte d'Abraham towards its intersection with the Dufferin-Montmorency Autoroute, through which the fence passed. Peaceful protesters, including individuals running speaker's corners, were in great numbers throughout this area during the afternoon.

Protestors who headed towards the yellow and red zones confronted the fence. Approximately 15 minutes after the bulk of the march reached the fence on Boulevard René Lévesque, the fence was brought down by protestors, which the security personnel deemed a clear security threat and danger not only to the conference delegates in the area, but also to the police.

A number of people moved into the once fenced-off area, and a catapult that launched teddy bears was rolled in. Eventually, the police line fell back and was replaced by a second line of officers, all wearing gas masks. The protestors were then repulsed by the police.

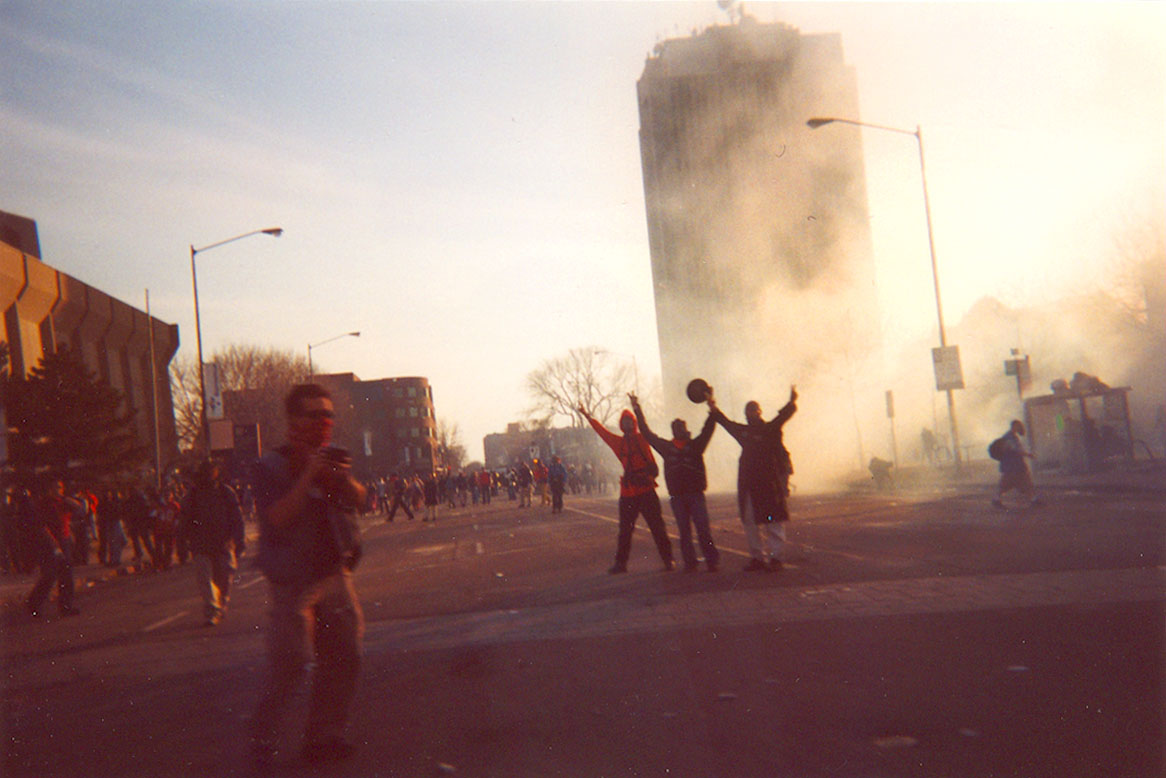
Tear gas thrown at protesters on 21 April 2001 in Quebec's Haute-Ville

Police responded to the protesters in the "green zone" by firing tear gas canisters, water cannon, and rubber bullets, dispersing large groupings of protesters both violent and peaceful, including teach-ins and teams of medics providing first aid to other protesters. Other tactical interventions aimed at arresting various perceived movement leaders and the expulsion of the independent media centre and protest clinic from their locations. So much tear gas was used that delegates were incommoded inside their meeting halls. The security wall was breached on several occasions, though protester incursion across the perimeter was limited. According to David Graeber in his book Direct Action: An Ethnography, "plastic bullets were being used increasingly, and from guns with laser sights so at night people could often see that the cops were intentionally aiming for heads or groins."

Protests continued into the night. In addition to continued peaceful protests and acts of civil disobedience, some protesters vandalized storefronts and advertisements and built bonfires. Police continued to respond with tear gas, in several cases firing at areas beneath the mountain where no protests were taking place, as well as with direct assaults on protester positions.

Protests concluded on Sunday, April 22.

=== Response to protest conduct ===
Police claimed that their actions were justified in protecting delegates from "red-zone" attempts to break through the fence, as well as to violent protesters destroying property and attacking the police, the media, and other protesters.

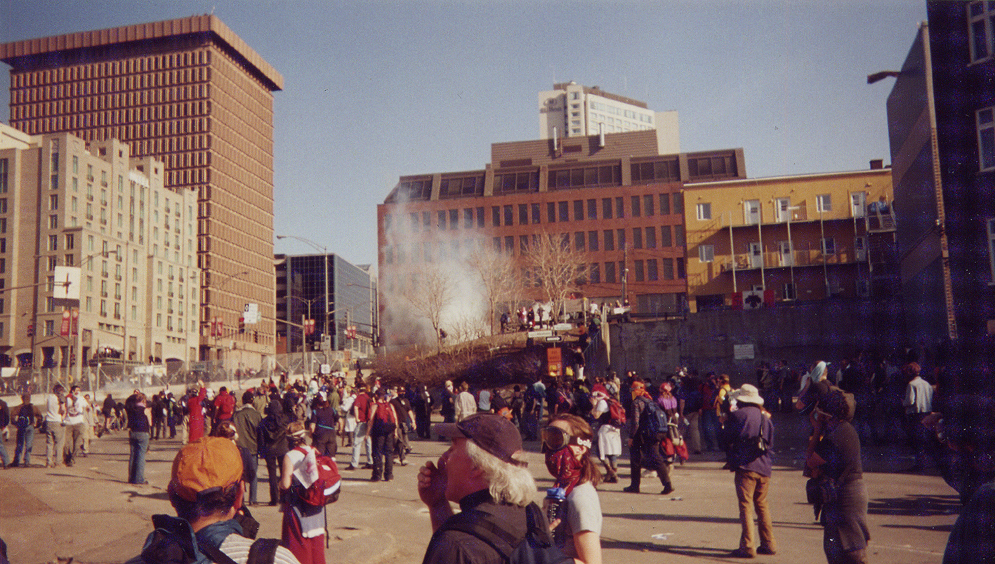
Tear gas thrown at protesters on 21 April 2001 near the security wall encircling the meeting site

Many protesters accuse the police of excessive force, claiming that the police's abundant use of tear gas and rubber bullets was both completely disproportionate to the scale of violence, and primarily directed at unarmed, peaceful demonstrators with dispersal of violent protesters an afterthought. A number of protesters were severely injured by rubber bullets; also, tear gas canisters were fired directly at protesters on numerous occasions, in violation of the protocols governing their use. They also criticize the actions of prison authorities. Altogether, the anti-globalization movement describes the actions of the police in Quebec City as an attempt to suppress dissent.

Intelligence operations prior to the event were also criticized, For example, Joan Russow, then leader of the Green Party of Canada, was arrested while attempting to photograph the prison where protesters would be held. During the event, some prominent protesters such as Jaggi Singh were arrested by undercover police officers while they were engaging in legal activities in "green-zone" areas.

A formal complaint regarding the RCMP's conduct was filed by New Democrat MP Svend Robinson with the Commission for Public Complaints against the RCMP. On November 13, 2003, the complaint's chairwoman Shirley Heafey found that "RCMP members used excessive and unjustified force in releasing tear gas to move the protesters when a more measured response could have been attempted first." The commission recommended improved crowd-control techniques, disciplinary action against certain officers, and a formal apology to protesters.

== Notes ==
Link to an article detailing some of the events in The Quebec City Riot of April 20, 2001.https://rabble.ca/babble/rabble-news-features/g-20-summit-toronto-and-tear-gas-summit-quebec-city

Preceded by 2nd Summit of the Americas	Summits of the Americas; 2001; Quebec City	Succeeded by 4th Summit of the Americas
