= 6th Summit of the Americas =

2012 international summit

6th Summit of the Americas VI Cumbre de las Américas
- Official summit logo
- Host country: Colombia
- Date: April 14–15, 2012
- Cities: Cartagena
- Follows: 5th Summit of the Americas
- Precedes: 7th Summit of the Americas

The sixth Summit of the Americas (Spanish: VI Cumbre de las Américas) was held at Cartagena, Colombia, on April 14–15, 2012. The central theme of the summit was "Connecting the Americas: Partners for Prosperity." The main issues at the summit's agenda was the exclusion of Cuba, the legalisation of drugs to fight the war on drugs and Argentina's sovereignty claims over the Falkland Islands. Additionally, criticism of an expansionist monetary policy was also leveled on the developed economies. A final statement was not forthcoming over the issue of Cuba's inclusion in the next summit which was supported by all states except the United States and Canada. Panama was chosen to host the 7th Summit of the Americas.

== Background ==
The Summits of the Americas are a continuing series of summits bringing together the leaders of the Americas including North America, Central America, the Caribbean and South America, except Cuba. The function of these summits is to foster discussion of a variety of issues affecting the western hemisphere. In the early 1990s, what were formerly ad hoc summits came to be institutionalised into a regular "Summits of the Americas" conference programme.

In regards to a potential controversy sparked by boycotts over the exclusion of Cuba, host president Santos flew to Cuba where he got assurances from Raúl Castro that the country would not insist on attendance that could have embarrassed Colombia.

== Agenda ==
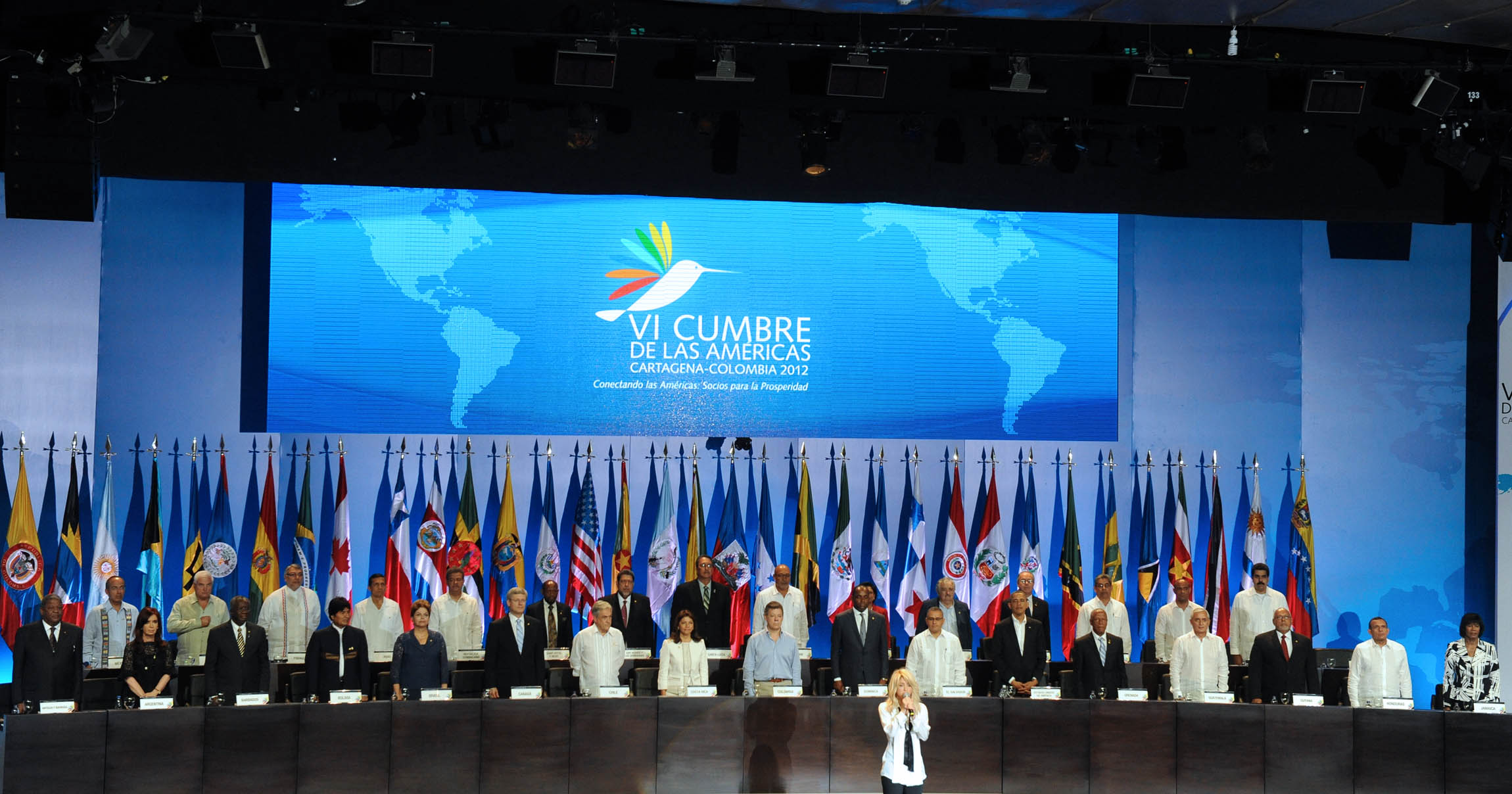
Opening ceremony of the 6th Summit of the Americas with a performance by Shakira.

The host president Juan Manuel Santos said of the expectations for the summit that "if the United States realises its long-term strategic interests are not in Afghanistan or Pakistan, but in Latin America...there will be great results." He also said that the issue of Cuba was one matter that would be discussed. U.S. President Barack Obama said the Cuban issue was moot to the U.S. claiming that the government of Cuba has "shown no interest in changing their relationship with the United States, nor any willingness to respect the democratic and human rights of the Cuban people." The U.S. and Canada cited a clause in the OAS charter that only includes democratically elected governments for their decisions not to invite Cuba. Another important issue would be the war on drugs amid U.S. allies Guatemala and Colombia calling for the legalisation of drugs, with Mexico also calling for at least a debate; a move the United States rejects with Obama saying before the summit that the U.S. would not support the measure to "legalise or decriminalise drugs because doing so would have serious negative consequences in all our countries in terms of public health and safety." Host Foreign Minister María Ángela Holguín said that the exclusion of Cuba and the Cuban blockade would be brought up by several countries including Argentina, Nicaragua and Peru.

The ongoing crisis and "war of words" between the United Kingdom and Argentina over the Falkland Islands, which has also resulted in a ban on marine vessels entering ports in Argentina, Brazil and Uruguay if they are coming from the islands and controversy over the "militarisation" of the conflict, was also said to be a point of discussion. Venezuelan Foreign Minister Nicolás Maduro said that "there should not be colonial possessions in our America." Argentinean Foreign Minister Hector Timerman said he hoped the summit would result in a "new manifestation of solidarity" over the dispute of the islands. Out of the 34 countries present at the summit the positions of two of them, Canada (opposed) and the U.S. (neutral), prevented the achievement of a joint statement supporting Argentina's claim over the Falklands.

=== Discussions ===
The discussions at the summit included Brazilian President Dilma Rousseff's criticism of U.S. expansionist monetary policy that she said was contributing to uncontrolled capital inflows causing emerging market currencies to appreciate and would hurt trade competitiveness. "The way these countries, the most developed ones, especially in the euro region in the last year, have reacted to the crisis with monetary expansion has produced a monetary tsunami. Obviously we have to take measures to defend ourselves. Note the word I chose - 'defend', not 'protect.'" Santos reiterated the criticism saying that "in some way, [they] are exporting their crisis to us via the appreciation of our currencies." He also opened the summit with the issue of Cuba: "It's an anachronism that keeps us anchored to a Cold War era we came out of various decades ago. [Another summit without Cuba is] unacceptable." He also accused those who opposed Cuba inclusion as having "ideological stubbornness", as well as saying Haiti "on its knees is unacceptable." Only two countries dissented over the inclusion of Cuba, while the member states of ALBA even said that a summit without Cuba was "unjustified and unsustainable" and that they would boycott summits without Cuba. For his part, despite saying, the United States wanted to work "as equal partners with our brothers and sisters in Latin America and the Caribbean" because of the potential for trade between "nearly a billion consumers", Obama dismissed a possibility of reform on the United States' Cuba policy and drug legalisation:

Sometimes those controversies date back to before I was born. And sometimes I feel as if ... we're caught in a time warp ... going back to the 1950s, gunboat diplomacy, and Yankees, and the Cold War and this and that. I don't mind a debate around issues like decriminalisation. I personally don't agree that's a solution to the problem. But I think that given the pressures that a lot of governments are under here, under-resourced, overwhelmed by violence, it's completely understandable that they would look for new approaches, and we want to cooperate with them.

Guatemala's Otto Pérez Molina worked with Honduras' Porfirio Lobo and Costa Rica's Laura Chinchilla to cover ground over the legalisation of drugs. Panama's Ricardo Martinelli was also said to be open to the idea, though Nicaragua and El Salvador (Nicaragua who together with Honduras boycotted a summit called by Guatemala to discuss the issue) were opposed to it.

Lobo also added that Central American foreign ministers would meet on 14 April to discuss Chinchilla's proposal for a "complete review" of the Central America's regional security strategy her government sanction in 2011. The meeting was also attended by the host president, Santos, and Mexico's Felipe Calderón. Santos and Calderon also said that they would discuss the issue of public safety as a result of the war on drugs.

Caribbean countries, including Saint Lucia, raised the matter of the proliferation of arms such as light weapons.

=== Reactions and other events ===
Bilateral meetings at the summit included those between the United States and Guatemala, El Salvador, Argentina and Peru.

Venezuelan Foreign Minister Nicolas Maduro said of Obama that his inner circle of advisers deliberately ensure that he is kept ignorant of the regional reality and that it was distasteful to Latin Americans that he visited Cartagena. He added: "Unfortunately, after three years in office he has inherited the cynicism and perversion of his predecessor."

==== Cuban response ====
While Nicaragua's Daniel Ortega held a solidarity rally with Cuba in Managua, Cuba's Ambassador to Nicaragua Eduardo Martinez Borbonet said his country was appreciative of Nicaragua's solidarity with the "legitimate rights" of Cuba. He also criticised the summit as "incomplete" and that it proved the U.S. failed to isolate Cuba. He further suggested that Ortega prove that there was a lack of transparency about the summit after the Obama Administration offered no new change to policy while trying to "conceal" the unanimous support for Cuba amongst CELAC countries, saying of Obama's summit speech that he was "an intelligent man, but he failed to behave as a statesman by avoiding issues like Cuba and the Argentinian claim of sovereignty over the illegally seized Falklands." According to him, the countries of Latin America and the Caribbean, despite ideological differences, came together in defense of their national interests. "Unless the U.S. really understands Latin America and the Caribbean, there would be no restructuring of a new approach in relations among equals, as promised by Obama, because we demand respect."

=== Conclusions ===
Argentina's Hector Timerman, who was not at the summit, said that a declaration from the summit was held up over the inclusion of Cuba that was supported by 32 countries but opposed by the U.S. He added that "there will be no final declaration of the summit because the United States vetoed the articles about Cuba, a veto that Canada joined." Canada's Stephen Harper was, however, reportedly considering a final declaration that would include calls for the reincorporation of Cuba without conditions, albeit with their reservations. The ALBA member states also said they would boycott any future summits without the inclusion of Cuba. Argentina and Uruguay's foreign ministers also said that they would not sign a declaration without the U.S. and Canada's veto of Cuban participation withdrawn. Colombia and Brazil also reiterated comments that there would not be a summit anymore without Cuba.

At the close of the summit at about noon on 15 April, Santos said: "There is no declaration because there is no consensus. Hopefully within three years we can have Cuba." However, he added that the 7th Summit of the Americas in 2015 would be held in Panama. Honduras' Porfirio Lobo also said that "there is no consensus yet. We must make a diagnosis, see what alternative we can find to what is being done."

Santos also outlined five mandates which, he said, came out of the summit:

1. Mitigate the adverse effect of natural disasters.
2. Security issues in order to combat violence, corruption, and transnational organised crime.
3. Infrastructure development by enhancing projects in order to establish hemisphere-wide road, rail, and electrical networks.
4. Information and communication technologies to be enhanced in the spheres of education, healthcare, innovation, entrepreneurship, productivity, competitiveness and the rise of micro, small, and medium-sized enterprises.
5. Importantly, to eradicate poverty by "establishing inclusive social policies that foster decent, dignified, and productive employment will be the priority for the region."

== Security issues ==
The day before the summit two explosions occurred in Bogotá near the U.S. embassy at about 19:30 and two other explosions followed in Cartagena.

== U.S. security misconduct ==
United States Secret Service personnel, who were in the country to protect the president, brought prostitutes into their hotel before the president arrived. Though Colombian police said that five people were involved, a preliminary investigation by the United States Southern Command suggested that 11 people could have been involved. They had their top-secret security clearances revoked, had to turn in their agency-issued BlackBerrys, were sent back from the summit, and were placed on administrative leave. The decision to send the agents back to the United States was initiated by the head of the Secret Service's field office in Miami, Paula Reid, who served as liaison between the Secret Service, local governments, and other U.S. agencies involved in preparing for President Obama's visit to Colombia after she received rumours of an unpaid prostitute knocking on doors and yelling in the hallway of a neighbouring hotel.

According to ABC News, some Secret Service personnel were also under investigation for possible drug use in Colombia. The Secret Service was expected to conduct polygraph examinations with the agents involved in the scandal, which also allegedly involved at least 10 members of the U.S. military who were working in a support role. Three of the agents were said to be leaving the agency. The agency's Assistant Director Paul Morrissey said that "although the Secret Service's investigation into allegations of misconduct by its employees in Cartagena, Colombia, is in its early stages, and is still ongoing, three of the individuals involved will separate or are in the process of separating from the agency", and added that one supervisor would take early retirement while another was sacked and a third had already resigned. Obama said that he would be "angry" if the reports were true. After being briefed by the Secret Service director Mark Sullivan, Morrissey announced that three more agents had chosen to resign, while another agent was implicated as part of the scandal. The United States Armed Forces also said that it was investigating suspects from all branches of the military: six suspects from the United States Army's 7th Special Forces Group, two people from the United States Marine Corps, two people from the United States Navy, and another from the United States Air Force for misconduct. A U.S. Air Force colonel was sent to Colombia to review the case and obtain evidence before returning to interview the suspects.

As of 24 April 2012, 12 Secret Service agents, among them two supervisors, are involved in the controversy; six of them have lost their jobs, and six others are on administrative leave pending an internal investigation. Twelve United States Armed Forces members, whose security clearances have been suspended by the Pentagon, are under investigation by the U.S. military, and about 20 Colombian women are suspected of having spent the night with members of the Secret Service at the Hotel Caribe. The military personnel under investigation, some of whom have violated a curfew, would face a "fair, thorough and complete investigation", according to a spokesman for the Southern Command, Col. Scott Malcom, and could, in case of soliciting prostitutes, face a year of confinement, dishonourable discharge, and/or loss of pay and benefits. The Secret Service declared that only three of the 12 implicated agents would stay with the agency. Of the three agents remaining with the Secret Service, one had been stripped of his security clearance, and the other were two cleared of wrongdoing. Of the other nine agents leaving the Secret Service, one has retired, two have been dismissed, and six have resigned.

Obama reacted to the initial news, saying that he would like to see a "rigorous" investigation and that "if it turns out that some of the allegations that have been made in the press are confirmed, then of course I'll be angry. We are representing the people of the United States, and when we travel to another country, I expect us to observe the highest standards." Obama later praised Secret Service agents as "incredible"; on Late Night with Jimmy Fallon, he said, "They protect me, they protect our girls. A couple of knuckleheads shouldn’t detract from what they do. What they were thinking, I don’t know. That's why they’re not there anymore." Defense Secretary Leon Panetta said, "We let the boss down because nobody's talking about what went on in Colombia other than this incident. I can speak for myself and my fellow chiefs, we're embarrassed by what occurred in Colombia." He added that the head of the Southern Command, General Douglas Fraser, had started an investigation of the issue; he expressed his "disappoint[ment] by the entire incident and that this behaviour is not in keeping with the professional standards expected of members of the United States military". The chairman of the joint chiefs of staff, General Martin Dempsey, also added that Obama had been let down as a result of this distraction. Senator Susan Collins, the highest-ranking Republican on the Senate Homeland Security and Governmental Affairs Committee added, "I am having a call this evening with the director of the Secret Service, because I find this to be so appalling. I can't help but think what if the women involved had been spies, what if they had been members of a drug cartel, what if they had planted equipment or eavesdropping devices?" She also said that Sullivan had told her that "the most important quality for a Secret Service officer is character. If the facts prove to be as reported on this, this is an incredible lack of character and breach of security, and potentially extremely serious." White House spokesman Jay Carney added that "Sullivan acted quickly in response to this incident, and he's overseeing an investigation as we speak. This incident needs to be investigated, and it is being investigated. We need to see what the investigation reveals. We’re not going to speculate about the conclusions it might reach."

On 25 April, United States Department of Homeland Security Secretary Janet Napolitano testified in a Senate hearing on the activities of the Homeland Security Department, which oversees the Secret Service. Napolitano stated during her hearing that the Secret Service's Office of Professional Responsibility had received no complaints of misconduct similar to what happened in Cartagena over the past two-and-a-half years, expressed her confidence in Secret Service director Mark J. Sullivan, called the allegations against the implicated agents "inexcusable", and promised a thorough investigation by saying, "We will leave no stone unturned." Cartagena's residents were at first amused about the controversy, but the attitude later changed when it was perceived that the controversy cast a shadow on Colombia's image as a prosperous and peaceful country.

One of the women involved in the controversy, Dania Londono Suarez, later told the media about the events. She said that she was introduced to the Secret Service agent with whom she spent the night by a friend at the bar. The agent then agreed to her services for US$800 at his hotel. The next morning she claimed the agent refused to pay her and instead told her to leave the room. With the help of two other Secret Service agents, she said that she tried to resolve the matter, but her client refused to open the door. After approximately 10:00, she gave up and left the hotel before a police officer encouraged her to share the matter. Suarez told W Radio that three Secret Service agents eventually paid her the money she was owed; however, she also added that if she had known that the men were Secret Service agents, she would not have told the police about the incident. She also said she did not see any confidential information in regard to Obama's visit. However, she did say that she could have stolen sensitive material given the circumstance that the agent she spent the night with fell asleep. She added: "If I was a terrorist I would have been able to do a thousand things."

As a consequence of the incident, the Secret Service imposed new rules for its employees. The changes prohibit agents from visiting "non-reputable establishments" or consuming alcohol ten hours before starting work. Additionally, they restrict who is allowed into hotel rooms.

An investigation by the Homeland Security Office of Inspector General concluded, in September 2012, that 13 agency staffers had "personal encounters" with local women during the summit. Three of the women did not ask for money; five asked for money and were paid; four asked for money but were refused, and one asked for money and was paid after requesting police assistance to collect.

During the investigation, an agent involved in the scandal raised concerns that the Secret Service was not consistent in its enforcement of its administrative rules, including a rule requiring agents to report any romantic relationships with foreign nationals. Special agent Rafael Prieto, assigned to President Barack Obama's security detail, admitted to investigators that he had been involved in a long-term affair with a woman from Mexico; following the admission, Prieto, a married father, was found dead in an apparent suicide. According to BBC News, "It is not thought that he had compromised national security with his relationship, but rather violated the agency's own administrative rules by failing to disclose it."

== Heads of state and government ==
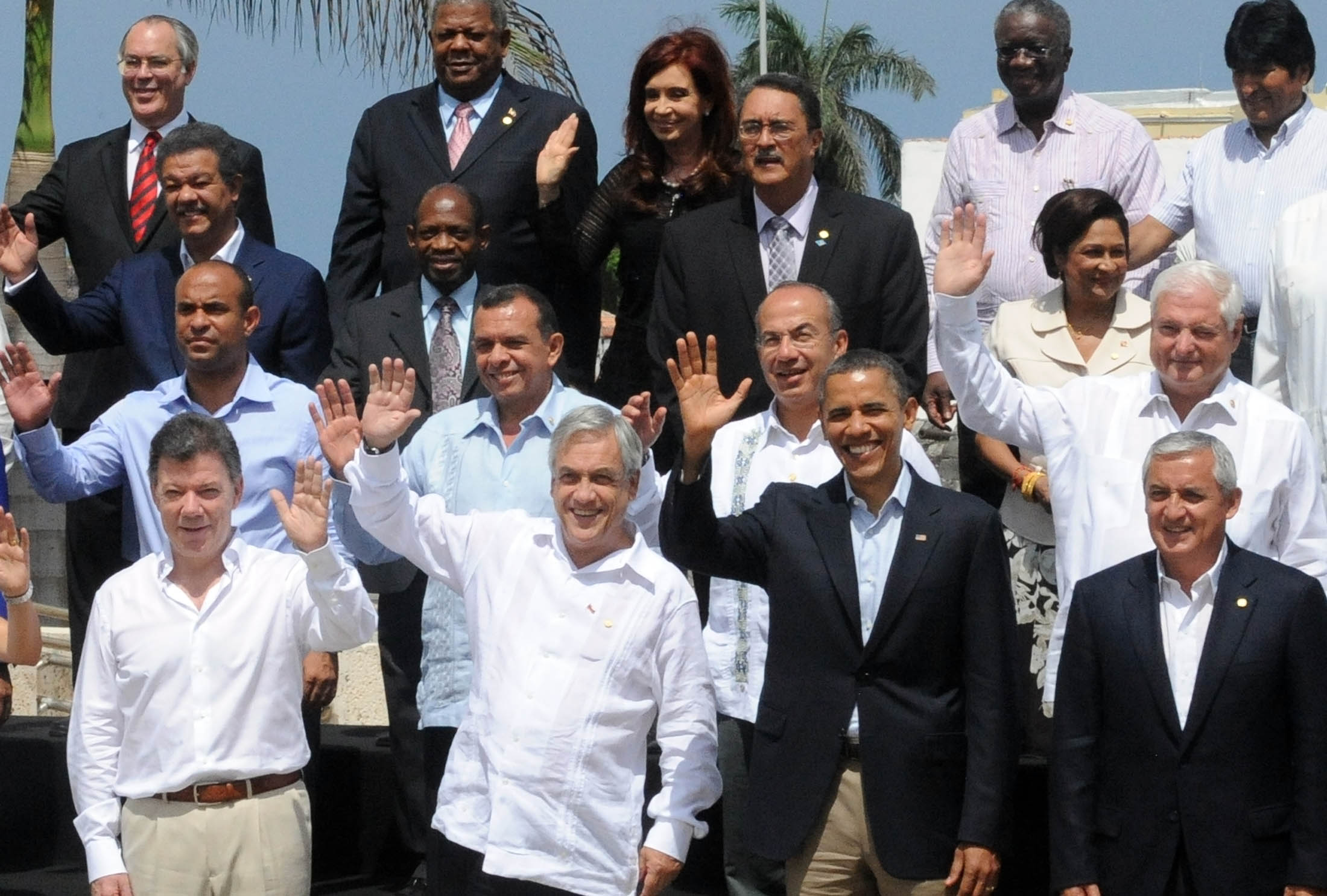
Partial group photo of leaders at the summit.

Ecuador did not attend the summit because of the exclusion of Cuba and other "essential issues." President Rafael Correa wrote a letter to the host Juan Manual Santos that read: "After some reflection I have decided that while I am the president of Ecuador, I will not attend any Summit of the Americas until it begins to make the decisions required. There has been talk of lack of consensus, but we all know that this is the veto of foreign powers, the intolerable situation in our 21st century America." He also reiterated that the boycott was not a slight on Colombia or Santos. Nicaraguan President Daniel Ortega was also absent from the summit over the issue of Cuba's exclusion saying: "It's not a favor anyone would be doing to Cuba. It's a right they've had taken away from them." El Salvador's Mauricio Funes was also absent. Venezuelan President Hugo Chávez ridiculed the summit for not featuring Cuba saying: "If the United States and Canada, refuse to discuss issues so profoundly unifying in Latin America like the issue of Cuba, the solidarity with Cuba or the issue of the Malvinas Islands, why else have the Summit of the Americas?" Bolivian President Evo Morales said that "we have arrived with the conviction that this must be the last summit without Cuba." Haitian President Michel Martelly was also absent because of medical issues, but he was represented by Foreign Minister Laurent Lamothe.

Due to illness, Chávez was unsure if he would attend the summit. Argentinean President Cristina Kirchner left in the morning of 15 April, before the summit was officially closed. Morales also left early after having said on 14 April that "all the countries here in Latin American and the Caribbean want Cuba to be present. But the United States won't accept [it]. It's like a dictatorship."

Summary of leaders
| Flag and country | Head of state / government |
|---|---|
| Antigua and Barbuda | Prime Minister Baldwin Spencer |
| Argentina | President Cristina Fernández de Kirchner |
| Bahamas | Prime Minister Hubert Ingraham |
| Barbados | Prime Minister Freundel Stuart |
| Belize | Prime Minister Dean Barrow |
| Bolivia | President Evo Morales |
| Brazil | President Dilma Rousseff |
| Canada | Prime Minister Stephen Harper |
| Chile | President Sebastián Piñera |
| Colombia | President Juan Manuel Santos |
| Costa Rica | President Laura Chinchilla |
| Dominica | Prime Minister Roosevelt Skerrit |
| Dominican Republic | President Leonel Fernández |
| El Salvador | President Mauricio Funes |
| Grenada | Prime Minister Tillman Thomas |
| Guatemala | President Otto Pérez Molina |
| Guyana | President Donald Ramotar |
| Haiti | Foreign Minister Laurent Lamothe |
| Honduras | President Porfirio Lobo Sosa |
| Jamaica | Prime Minister Portia Simpson-Miller |
| Mexico | President Felipe Calderón |
| Panama | President Ricardo Martinelli |
| Paraguay | President Fernando Lugo |
| Peru | President Ollanta Humala |
| Saint Kitts and Nevis | Prime Minister Denzil Douglas |
| Saint Lucia | Prime Minister Kenny Anthony |
| Saint Vincent and the Grenadines | Prime Minister Ralph Gonsalves |
| Suriname | President Dési Bouterse |
| Trinidad and Tobago | Prime Minister Kamla Persad-Bissessar |
| United States of America | President Barack Obama |
| Uruguay | President José Mujica |
| Venezuela | Foreign Minister Nicolás Maduro |

== Reactions from non-governmental organisations ==
Alex Main of the Center for Economic and Policy Research suggested that Obama's claims in the 5th Summit of the Americas to start a "new chapter" in the United States' hemispheric relations would be undone by following the past practices of his predecessor George W. Bush as he could call on the Colombian and Panamanian free trade agreement and offer reform to Cuba–United States relations, including having the country participate at the next summit. He also suggested other governments in Central America, led by the right-winged government of Guatemala's Otto Pérez Molina, would call for a debate on the legalisation of drugs in a bid to stem the tide in the war on drugs, which would be a difficult prospect for a U.S. president facing an election. He concluded in saying that there could be a firmer view that the "Summit of the Americas has become an archaic instrument of US policy" due to the lack of reform in the U.S.' direction in hemispheric relations whereas the rest of the region has moved towards Latin American integration with such moves as the formation of multilateral bodies such as Mercosur, ALBA, UNASUR and CELAC to counteract the OAS in its exclusion of the United States and Canada. Adam Isacson of the Washington Office on Latin America said of the waning influence of the summit that "the label 'Americas' doesn't seem to mean that much anymore unless you're a cartographer."

== Sideline summits ==
For the first time, a C.E.O. Summit from companies in the hemisphere was held alongside the summit. In addition a social forum was also held for people from "diverse social organisations".

| Preceded by 5th Summit of the Americas | Summits of the Americas; 2012; Cartagena, Colombia | Succeeded by 7th Summit of the Americas |
