= Second Peoples' Summit of the Americas =

The Second People's Summit was held in Santiago, Chile, on the 18th and 19 April 1998, and was a meeting of government officials from across the Americas to encourage international cooperation and give opportunity for discussion.

The Plan of Action declares an intention to improve education using measures targeted towards disadvantaged groups; to preserve and strengthen democracy, justice, and human rights (including typical legal rights, reducing sexual inequality, reducing discrimination); to reduce corruption, and others.

The First People's Summit was held from 9th to 11 December 1994 in Miami, United States.
