= 2nd Summit of the Americas =

- 2nd Summit of the Americas logo
- Host country: Chile
- Dates: April 18–19, 1998
- Follows: 1st Summit of the Americas
- Precedes: 3rd Summit of the Americas

The 2nd Summit of the Americas was held in Santiago, Chile, on April 18–19, 1998.

This gathering of regional leaders was the first attempt in four years to negotiate conditions for the creation of a hemispheric free trade area. No final agreements were made, but the nations set up a Trade Negotiations Committee (TNC) consisting of vice ministers from each country that would meet every few months. Negotiations began with the Summits of the Americas in Miami in 1994.

== Overview ==
The "Summit of the Americas" is the name for a continuing series of summits bringing together the leaders of North America and South America. The function of these summits is to foster discussion of a variety of issues affecting the western hemisphere. These high-level summit meetings have been organized by a number of multilateral bodies under the aegis of the Organization of American States. In the early 1990s, what were formerly ad hoc summits came to be institutionalized into a regular "Summits of the Americas" conference program.

- December 9–11, 1994 -- 1st Summit of the Americas at Miami in the United States.
- December 7–8, 1996 -- Summit of the Americas on Sustainable Development at Santa Cruz de la Sierra in Bolivia.

== Protests and demonstrations ==
The summits which garnered most general public and media attention were the Quebec City and Mar del Plata events, both provoking very large anti-globalization and anti–Free Trade Area of the Americas protests. Police responses to protesters and demonstrations developed into independent news stories.

== Notes ==
Preceded by 1st Summit of the Americas	Summits of the Americas; 1998; Santiago, Chile	Succeeded by 3rd Summit of the Americas
