= Free Trade Area of the Americas =

Failed 2005 trade agreement for North and South America

The Free Trade Area of the Americas logo, representing the Americas as geometric figures

The Free Trade Area of the Americas (FTAA, Spanish: Área de Libre Comercio de las Américas, ALCA, Portuguese: Área de Livre Comércio das Américas, ALCA, French: Zone de libre-échange des Amériques, ZLEA) was a proposed agreement to eliminate or reduce the trade barriers among all countries in the Americas, excluding Cuba. Negotiations to establish the FTAA ended in failure, however, with all parties unable to reach an agreement by the 2005 deadline they had set for themselves.

== History ==
=== Origins ===
Discussions about the Free Trade Area of the Americas began at the 1st Summit of the Americas in Miami on December 11, 1994. The FTAA came to public attention during the third summit, held in Quebec City in 2001, as the meeting was targeted by large anti-corporatization and anti-globalization protests. The Miami negotiations in 2003 met similar protests, though not as large.

In the last round of negotiations, trade ministers from 34 countries met in Miami, Florida, in the United States, in November 2003 to discuss the proposal. The proposed agreement was an extension of the North American Free Trade Agreement (NAFTA) between Canada, Mexico, and the United States. Discussions have faltered over similar points as the Doha Development Round of World Trade Organization (WTO) talks; developed nations sought expanded trade in services and increased intellectual property rights, while less developed nations sought an end to agricultural subsidies and free trade in agricultural goods. Similar to the WTO talks, Brazil took a leadership role among the less developed nations, while the United States took a similar role for the developed nations.

=== Disagreements ===
In previous negotiations, the United States had pushed for a single comprehensive agreement to reduce trade barriers for goods, while increasing intellectual property protection. Specific intellectual property protections could include Digital Millennium Copyright Act style copyright protections similar to the U.S.-Australia Free Trade Agreement. Another protection would likely have restricted the importation or cross importation of pharmaceuticals, similar to the proposed agreement between the United States and Canada. Brazil posed a three-track approach that called for a series of bilateral agreements to reduce specific tariffs on goods, a hemispheric pact on rules of origin, and a dispute resolution process Brazil proposed to omit the more controversial issues from the FTA, leaving them to the WTO.

The location of the FTA Secretariat was to have been determined in 2005. The contending cities were: Atlanta, Chicago, Galveston, Houston, San Juan, and Miami in the United States; Cancún and Puebla in Mexico; Panama City, Panama; and Port of Spain, Trinidad and Tobago. The U.S. city of Colorado Springs also submitted its candidacy in the early days but subsequently withdrew. Miami, Panama City and Puebla served successively an interim secretariat headquarters during the negotiation process.

The last summit was held at Mar del Plata, Argentina, in November 2005, but no agreement on FTA was reached. Of the 39 countries present at the negotiations, 20 pledged to meet again in 2006 to resume negotiations, but no meeting took place. The failure of the Mar del Plata summit to establish a comprehensive FTA agenda augured poorly.

=== Current status ===
The FTAA missed the targeted deadline of 2005, which followed the stalling of useful negotiations of the World Trade Organization Ministerial Conference of 2005. Over the next few years, some governments, most notably the United States, not wanting to lose any chance of hemispheric trade expansion moved in the direction of establishing a series of bilateral trade deals. The leaders planned further discussions at the 6th Summit of the Americas in Cartagena, Colombia in 2012, but these discussions did not take place.

As of 2022, U.S. trade policy reflected a withdrawal from a reliance on trade agreements, with a preference for smaller bilateral deals.

== Planned membership ==
The following countries were planned to be part of the Free Trade Area of the Americas:

- Antigua and Barbuda
- Argentina
- Bahamas
- Barbados
- Belize
- Bolivia
- Brazil
- Canada
- Chile
- Colombia
- Costa Rica
- Dominica
- Dominican Republic
- Ecuador
- El Salvador
- Grenada
- Guatemala
- Guyana
- Haiti
- Honduras
- Jamaica
- Mexico
- Nicaragua
- Panama
- Paraguay
- Peru
- Saint Kitts and Nevis
- Saint Lucia
- Saint Vincent and the Grenadines
- Suriname
- Trinidad and Tobago
- United States
- Uruguay
- Venezuela

== Support and opposition ==
A vocal critic of the FTAA was Venezuelan president Hugo Chávez, who has described it as an "annexation plan" and a "tool of imperialism" for the exploitation of South America. As a counterproposal to this initiative, Chávez promoted the Bolivarian Alliance for the Americas (Alianza Bolivariana para las Américas, ALBA) which emphasizes energy and infrastructure agreements among underdeveloped American nations. Evo Morales of Bolivia has referred to the U.S.-backed Free Trade Area of the Americas, as "an agreement to legalize the colonization of the Americas".

On the other hand, the then presidents of Brazil, Luiz Inácio Lula da Silva, and Argentina, Néstor Kirchner, have stated that they do not oppose the FTAA but they do demand that the agreement provide for the elimination of U.S. agriculture subsidies, the provision of effective access to foreign markets and further consideration towards the needs and sensibilities of its members.

One of the most contentious issues of the treaty proposed by the United States is with concerns to patents and copyrights. Critics claim that if the measures proposed by the United States were implemented and applied this would reduce scientific research in underdeveloped countries of the Americas. On the Council of Canadians web site, Maude Barlow wrote: "This agreement sets enforceable global rules on patents, copyrights and trademark. It has gone far beyond its initial scope of protecting original inventions or cultural products and now permits the practice of patenting plants and animal forms as well as seeds. It promotes the private rights of corporations over local communities and their genetic heritage and traditional medicines".

On the weekend of April 20, 2001, the 3rd Summit of the Americas was a summit held in Quebec City, Canada. This international meeting was a round of negotiations regarding a proposed FTAA.

== Agreements ==
There are currently 34 countries in the Western Hemisphere, stretching from Canada to Chile that still have the FTAA as a long-term goal. The Implementation of a full multilateral FTAA between all parties could be made possible by enlargement of existing agreements. At this point Agreements within the Area of the Americas include:

=== Previous agreements ===
- Canada: Canada–United States Free Trade Agreement (1988; superseded by the NAFTA)
- Canada, Mexico and United States: North American Free Trade Agreement (1994; superseded by the USMCA)
- Costa Rica- Dominican Republic (superseded by DR-CAFTA)
- Costa Rica- Trinidad and Tobago (superseded by a Costa Rica – CARICOM FTA).

=== Current agreements ===
- Canada, Mexico and United States: United States–Mexico–Canada Agreement (USMCA; 2020)
- Costa Rica, El Salvador, Guatemala, Honduras, Nicaragua, Dominican Republic and United States: Dominican Republic–Central America Free Trade Agreement (DR-CAFTA; 2008)
- Chile, Colombia, Mexico and Peru: Pacific Alliance (2012)
- Chile–United States Free Trade Agreement (2004)
- Peru–United States Trade Promotion Agreement (2007)
- United States–Colombia Free Trade Agreement (2011)
- Panama–United States Trade Promotion Agreement (2011)
- Canada – Chile
- Canada – Colombia
- Canada – Costa Rica
- Canada – Honduras
- Canada – Panama
- Canada – Peru
- Chile – Mexico
- Chile – Costa Rica
- Colombia – CARICOM
- Colombia – Costa Rica
- Colombia – Northern Triangle
- Costa Rica – Mexico
- Costa Rica – CARICOM
- Mexico – Nicaragua
- Mexico – Uruguay
- Argentina, Bolivia, Brazil, Paraguay and Uruguay – Mercosur (1991)
- Bolivia, Colombia, Ecuador and Peru – Andean Community (1969)

=== Proposed agreements ===
Active negotiations

- Canada-CARICOM:
- Canada-Central America (CA4TA – Guatemala, El Salvador, Nicaragua, Honduras)
- Canada-Mexico-Peru-Chile [among other Pacific nations]: Trans-Pacific Partnership

Negotiations on hold

- CARICOM-Mercosur:
- United States-Ecuador: U.S.-Ecuador Free Trade Agreement
- CARICOM-North American Free Trade Agreement, first discussed in 1993–1994

== Security pacts ==
- United States-Central America-Mexico (Mérida Initiative)
- United States-CARICOM-Dominican Republic (Partnership for Prosperity and Security in the Caribbean)

== See also ==
- Rules of origin
- Market access
- Free-trade area
- Tariffs
- Miami model
- Pacific Alliance
- Protection of Broadcasts and Broadcasting Organizations Treaty
- Transatlantic Free Trade Area (TAFTA)
- Community of Latin American and Caribbean States
- Union of South American Nations
