= 1st Summit of the Americas =

Diplomatic conference held in Miami, Florida in 1994

- 1st Summit of the Americas logo
- Host country: United States
- Date: December 9–11, 1994
- Precedes: 2nd Summit of the Americas

The First Summit of the Americas was convened in Miami, Florida, United States, on December 9–11, 1994.

This summit was the first of a series of events for leaders from countries of the Americas.

From across North and South America thirty-four nations met in Miami and agreed to create Free Trade Area of the Americas (FTAA). All countries were welcomed to participate except for Cuba.

The Summit of the Americas accepted a Declaration of Principles to aid in the process of discussing a continent wide trade bloc. The declaration principles included: Partnership for Development and Prosperity which meant that the heads of all the states in the Americas were committed to promote democracy, its values, and various institutions. Another aspect of the agreement was that all of the Americas were to be joined in pursuing prosperity for every nation through open markets.

The summit adopted a procedure to preserve and strengthen the community of democracies of the Americas. It was agreed upon that all nations would promote democracy and that citizens have the right to participate in government. The thirty-four nations that met in Miami understood that democracy requires an attack on all corruption which is what the agreement stated. There was also a call to cooperation among the nations in eliminating trafficking of illegal drugs. Another outline in the summit was the procedure to promote prosperity through economic integration and free trade. This required a promotion for all nations there should be no subsidies and nations should not practice in unfair laws.

== Overview ==
The "Summits of the Americas" is the name for a continuing series of summits bringing together the leaders of North America and South America. The function of these summits is to foster discussion of a variety of issues affecting the western hemisphere. These high-level summit meetings have been organized by a number of multilateral bodies under the aegis of the Organization of American States. In the early 1990s, what were formerly ad hoc summits came to be institutionalized into a regular "Summits of the Americas" conference program.

== Protests and demonstrations ==
The summits which garnered most general public and media attention were the Quebec City and Mar del Plata events, both provoking very large anti-globalization and anti–Free Trade Area of the Americas protests. Police responses to protesters and demonstrations developed into independent news stories.

== Notes ==
| Preceded by – | Summits of the Americas; 1994; Miami | Succeeded by 2nd Summit of the Americas |
