= List of international presidential trips made by Enrique Peña Nieto =

List of international presidential trips made by Enrique Peña Nieto

This is a list of international presidential trips made by Enrique Peña Nieto, the 64th president of Mexico. Enrique Peña Nieto made 68 international trips to 45 countries and territories during his presidency from 1 December 2012 to 30 November 2018.

== Summary ==
The number of visits per country where President Peña Nieto traveled are:

- One visit to Australia, Belgium, Belize, Canada, Denmark, French Guiana, Haiti, Honduras, Hong Kong, Indonesia, Israel, Ivory Coast, Japan, Kuwait, the Netherlands, Paraguay, the Philippines, Portugal, Qatar, Russia, Saudi Arabia, South Africa, the United Arab Emirates, Uruguay, Venezuela and Vietnam
- Two visits to Argentina, Costa Rica, Ecuador, Italy, Spain, Switzerland, Turkey, the United Kingdom and Vatican City
- Three visits to Cuba, Germany, Guatemala and Panama
- Four visits to Chile, China and France
- Six visits to Peru
- Seven visits to Colombia
- Eleven visits to the United States

== 2013 ==
	Country	Areas visited	Date(s)	Notes	Image
1	Chile	Santiago	25–28 January	Attended the 1st Summit of CELAC and the European Union.	
1	Uruguay	Montevideo	29 January	Official working visit. Bilateral meeting with the President of Uruguay, José Mujica.	
2	Costa Rica	San José	19 February	Meeting with President of Costa Rica Laura Chinchilla. First Summit of Heads of State and Government of the Central American Integration System and Mexico.	
3	Venezuela	Caracas	8 March	Attended the State funeral of Hugo Chávez, President of Venezuela.	
4	Vatican City	Vatican City	18–20 March	Attended the Inauguration Mass of Pope Francis.	
4	Italy	Rome	18–20 March	Meeting with various world leaders.	
5	Hong Kong	Hong Kong	5–7 April	Meeting with C. Y. Leung, Chief Executive of Hong Kong.	
5	China	Sanya, Boao	5–7 April	Bilateral meeting with President of China Xi Jinping. Boao Forum for Asia.	
5	Japan	Tokyo	7–9 April	Meeting with His Majesty Akihito, Emperor of Japan, and Empress Michiko. Meeting with Prime Minister of Japan Shinzo Abe, Bunmei Ibuki, President of the House of Representatives, and Kenji Hirata, President of the House of Councillors.	
6	Peru	Lima	23–25 April	World Economic Forum on Latin America. Meeting with the President of Peru, Ollanta Humala.	
6	Haiti	Port-au-Prince	26 April	Fifth Summit of Heads of State and Government of the Association of Caribbean States. Meeting with President of Colombia Juan Manuel Santos, President of Chile Sebastián Piñera, and President of Haiti Michel Martelly.	
7	Colombia	Cali	22–23 May	Attended the 7th Summit of the Pacific Alliance.	
8	Guatemala	Guatemala City	31 May	Meeting with President Otto Pérez Molina.	
9	United Kingdom	London, Northern Ireland	15–19 June	Bilateral meeting with Deputy Prime Minister of the United Kingdom Nick Clegg. G8 Leaders' Summit.	
10	United States	Idaho	10–11 July	Annual Sun Valley Conference. Meetings with King Abdullah II of the Hashemite Kingdom of Jordan, William Gates III of Microsoft, Warren Buffett of Berkshire Hathaway, and Muhtar Kent of The Coca-Cola Company.	
11	Russia	Saint Petersburg	3–7 September	Attended the G20 Summit in Saint Petersburg.	
12	Indonesia	Bali	3–9 October	Asia-Pacific Economic Cooperation.	
13	Panama	Panama City	17–19 October	Official visit to Panama to meet with President of Panama Ricardo Martinelli for the 23rd Ibero-American Summit.	
14	French Guiana	Cayenne	9 December	Working meeting.	
14	Ivory Coast	Abidjan	9 December	Meeting with the minister of petroleum and energy, Adama Toungara.	
14	South Africa	Johannesburg	10–11 December	Funeral of Nelson Mandela.	
15	Turkey	Ankara, Istanbul, İzmir	16–19 December	State visit to Turkey. Meeting with Abdullah Gül.	

== 2014 ==
	Country	Areas visited	Date(s)	Notes	Image
16	Switzerland	Davos	23–24 January	Attended the World Economic Forum.	
17	Cuba	Havana	28–29 January	Attended the 2nd Summit of the Community of Latin American and Caribbean States.	
18	Colombia	Cartagena	10 February	Attended the 8th Summit of the Pacific Alliance.	
19	Ecuador	Quito	9 March	State visit. Meeting with President of Ecuador Rafael Correa.	
19	Chile	Santiago	10–11 March	Attendance at the presidential inauguration ceremony of president-elect Michelle Bachelet. Bilateral meeting with the President of Chile Michelle Bachelet.	
20	Honduras	Comayagua	2 April	Official working visit. Bilateral meeting with President of Honduras Juan Orlando Hernández.	
20	Panama	Panama City	2–3 April	Participation in the World Economic Forum on Latin America.	
21	Portugal	Lisbon	5–6 June	State visit to Portugal. Meeting with Prime Minister Pedro Passos Coelho.	
21	Vatican City	Vatican City	7 June	State visit to the Holy See. Meeting with Pope Francis.	
21	Spain	Madrid	9–10 June	State visit to Spain. Meeting with Prime Minister Mariano Rajoy and the King and Queen of Spain, Juan Carlos I and Queen Sofía.	
22	Colombia	Bogotá	6–7 August	Attendance at the inauguration ceremony for the second term of President of Colombia Juan Manuel Santos. Bilateral meeting with King of Spain Juan Carlos I.	
23	United States	Los Angeles	25–26 August	Working visit to California. Working meeting with Governor of California Jerry Brown.	
24	United States	New York	20–25 September	Participation in the 69th session of the United Nations General Assembly.	
25	China	Beijing	9–14 November	State visit to China. Participation in the 22nd meeting of APEC economic leaders.	
25	Australia	Brisbane	15–16 November	State visit to Australia. Participation in the G20 Summit.	
26	Peru	Lima	9–10 December	Attendance at the plenary meeting of the 2014 United Nations Climate Change Conference.	

== 2015 ==
	Country	Areas visited	Date(s)	Notes	Image
27	United States	Washington, D.C.	5–6 January	Official visit to Washington, D.C. Meeting with President Barack Obama.	
28	United Kingdom	London	1–6 March	State visit to the United Kingdom as part of the Mexico–United Kingdom Dual Year 2015, a program of bilateral exchanges between the two countries.	
29	Panama	Panama City	9–11 April	Participation in the 7th Summit of the Americas. Bilateral meetings with President of Colombia Juan Manuel Santos, President of Peru Ollanta Humala, and President of Brazil Dilma Rousseff. Participation in the Business Forum of the Americas, Dialogue of Heads of State, together with President of Panama Juan Carlos Varela and President of the United States Barack Obama.	
30	Belgium	Brussels	10–11 June	Participated in the 2nd CELAC–EU Summit.	
30	Italy	Milan, Rome	12–15 June	Visit to the Milan Universal Exposition. Meeting with Prime Minister of Italy Matteo Renzi. Meeting with the mayor of Rome, Ignazio Marino, and with the President of Italy Sergio Mattarella.	
31	Peru	Paracas	1–3 July	Participation in the 10th Summit of the Pacific Alliance.	
32	France	Paris, Marseille	12–16 July	State visit. Meeting with President of France François Hollande.	
33	United States	New York	26–28 September	Participation in the 70th United Nations General Assembly. Meeting with Secretary-General of the United Nations Ban Ki-moon. Participation in the Summit for the Adoption of the 2030 Agenda for Sustainable Development.	
34	Turkey	Antalya	15–16 November	Participation in the G20 Summit. Bilateral meetings with Prime Minister of Canada Justin Trudeau, President of Turkey Recep Tayyip Erdoğan, and President of China Xi Jinping.	
34	Philippines	Manila	17–19 November	Participation in the 27th Summit of the Asia-Pacific Economic Cooperation forum. Bilateral meeting with President of the Philippines Benigno Aquino III.	
35	France	Paris	28 November – 2 December	Participation in the 2015 United Nations Climate Change Conference.	

== 2016 ==
	Country	Areas visited	Date(s)	Notes	Image
36	Saudi Arabia	Riyadh	17 January	State visit. Bilateral meeting with King of Saudi Arabia Salman bin Abdulaziz.	
36	United Arab Emirates	Abu Dhabi, Dubai	17–19 January	State visit. Bilateral meeting with Mohamed bin Zayed Al Nahyan.	
36	Kuwait	Kuwait City	20 January	State visit. Meeting with the president of the Chamber of Commerce and Industry, Ali Mohammed Thunayan Al Ghanim.	
36	Qatar	Doha	21 January	State visit. Attendance at the opening of the Mexico–Qatar Business Forum.	
36	Switzerland	Davos	21–23 January	Participation in the World Economic Forum. Bilateral meeting with President of the Swiss Confederation Johann Schneider-Ammann.	
37	Ecuador	Quito	26–27 January	Participation in the 4th CELAC Summit. Bilateral meetings with President of Guatemala Jimmy Morales, President of Panama Juan Carlos Varela, and President of Costa Rica Luis Guillermo Solís.	
38	United States	Houston	21–22 February	Participation in the opening ceremony of the IHS CERAWeek international conference. Working meeting with Governor of Texas Greg Abbott.	
39	United States	Washington, D.C.	31 March – 1 April	Participation in the Fourth Nuclear Security Summit.	
40	Germany	Berlin, Hamburg	10–13 April	State visit. Beginning of the Mexico–Germany Dual Year. Bilateral meeting with President of Germany Joachim Gauck and with Chancellor of Germany Angela Merkel.	
40	Denmark	Copenhagen	13–14 April	Official visit to Denmark. Meeting with Queen Margrethe II and with Prime Minister of Denmark Lars Løkke Rasmussen.	
41	United States	New York	18–19 April	Participation in the opening of the special session of the United Nations General Assembly on the world drug problem.	
42	Cuba	Havana	23 June	Witness of honor at the signing of the Colombian peace agreement.	
43	Canada	Ottawa	26–29 June	Participation in the 8th North American Leaders' Summit. Bilateral meetings with Prime Minister of Canada Justin Trudeau and with President of the United States Barack Obama.	
43	Chile	Puerto Varas	30 June – 1 July	Participation in the 11th Summit of the Pacific Alliance.	
44	United States	Washington, D.C.	21–22 July	Official working visit. Bilateral meeting with President of the United States Barack Obama.	
45	Peru	Lima	27–28 July	Attendance at the presidential inauguration ceremony. Inauguration of Pedro Pablo Kuczynski.	
45	Argentina	Buenos Aires	28–29 July	State visit. Bilateral meeting with President of Argentina Mauricio Macri.	
46	China	Hangzhou	2–5 September	Participation in the G20 Summit.	
47	United States	New York	18–20 September	Participation in the 71st United Nations General Assembly. Participation in the Leaders' Summit on Refugees.	
48	Colombia	Cartagena	25–26 September	Witness of honor at the protocol ceremony for the signing of the Final Agreement for the Termination of the Conflict and the Construction of a Stable and Lasting Peace between the Government of the Republic of Colombia and the Revolutionary Armed Forces of Colombia.	
49	Israel	Jerusalem	28 September – 1 October	Attendance at the state funeral of former president of the State of Israel, Shimon Peres.	
50	Colombia	Bogotá, Cartagena	26–29 October	State visit. Bilateral meeting with President of Colombia Juan Manuel Santos. Participation in the 25th Ibero-American Summit. He also held bilateral meetings with King of Spain Felipe VI, President of Peru Pedro Pablo Kuczynski, and President of Guatemala Jimmy Morales.	
51	Peru	Lima	18–20 November	Participation in APEC Peru 2016. Bilateral meetings with Prime Minister of Canada Justin Trudeau and President of the United States Barack Obama.	
52	Cuba	Havana	29 November	Attendance at the state funeral of Fidel Castro.	

== 2017 ==
	Country	Areas visited	Date(s)	Notes	Image
53	Costa Rica	San José	28–29 March	Participation in the 16th Summit of the Tuxtla Dialogue and Coordination Mechanism. Bilateral meetings with President of Costa Rica Luis Guillermo Solís, President of Guatemala Jimmy Morales, and President of Panama Juan Carlos Varela.	
54	Guatemala	Guatemala City	5–6 June	State visit. Bilateral meeting with President of Guatemala Jimmy Morales. Participation in the Mexico–Guatemala Business Forum.	
55	Colombia	Cali	29–30 June	Participation in the 12th Summit of the Pacific Alliance.	
56	France	Paris	6 July	Official working visit. Bilateral meeting with President of France Emmanuel Macron.	
56	Germany	Hamburg	7–8 July	Participation in the G20 Summit. He held bilateral meetings with Indian Prime Minister Narendra Modi, Spanish Prime Minister Mariano Rajoy, Italian Prime Minister Paolo Gentiloni, Canadian Prime Minister Justin Trudeau, and American President Donald Trump.	
57	China	Xiamen	4–6 September	Invited to the 9th BRICS summit meeting. Bilateral meeting with President of China Xi Jinping.	
58	Belize	Belmopan	25 October	Participation in the Fourth Mexico–Caricom Summit. Bilateral meeting with Prime Minister of Belize Dean Barrow.	
59	Vietnam	Da Nang	8–11 November	Participation in the 29th summit of the Asia-Pacific Economic Cooperation forum. He held bilateral meetings with Vietnamese President Trần Đại Quang, Canadian Prime Minister Justin Trudeau, Singaporean Prime Minister Lee Hsien Loong, Japanese Prime Minister Shinzo Abe, and Australian Prime Minister Malcolm Turnbull.	
60	France	Paris	9–12 December	Bilateral meeting with the secretary-general of the Organisation for Economic Co-operation and Development, José Ángel Gurría. Participation in the One Planet Summit on climate change.	

== 2018 ==
	Country	Areas visited	Date(s)	Notes	Image
61	Paraguay	Asunción	17–18 January	State visit. Bilateral meeting with President of Paraguay Horacio Cartes.	
62	Chile	Santiago	10–11 March	Attendance at the presidential inauguration ceremony of president-elect Sebastián Piñera.	
63	Peru	Lima	13–14 April	Participation in the 8th Summit of the Americas.	
64	Germany	Hanover	22–23 April	Opening of Hannover Messe 2018 together with Chancellor of Germany Angela Merkel.	
64	Netherlands	The Hague	23–24 April	State visit. Bilateral meetings with the King of the Netherlands, Willem-Alexander of the Netherlands, and with Prime Minister of the Netherlands Mark Rutte. Meeting with Ben van Beurden, CEO of Shell.	
64	Spain	Madrid	24–26 April	Official working visit. Bilateral meetings with Prime Minister Mariano Rajoy and with King Felipe VI and Queen Letizia.	
65	Colombia	Bogotá	6–8 August	Attendance at the presidential transfer of power ceremony and inauguration of president-elect Iván Duque.	
66	United States	New York	25–28 September	Participation in the 73rd United Nations General Assembly. Participation in the One Planet Summit together with President of France Emmanuel Macron. Meeting with Klaus Schwab, founder of the World Economic Forum, and Børge Brende, president of the World Economic Forum.	
67	Guatemala	Antigua Guatemala	15–16 November	Participated in the 26th Ibero-American Summit. He also held a bilateral meeting with King Felipe VI.	
68	Argentina	Buenos Aires	29–30 November	Participation in the G20 Summit. Signing of the United States–Mexico–Canada Agreement together with Prime Minister of Canada Justin Trudeau and President of the United States Donald Trump.	

== Multilateral meetings ==
Multilateral meetings of the following intergovernmental organizations took place during Enrique Peña Nieto's presidency (2012–2018).

Group	Year					
Group	2013	2014	2015	2016	2017	2018
G20	5–6 September, (Russia) Saint Petersburg	15–16 November, (Australia) Brisbane	15–16 November, (Turkey) Antalya	4–5 September, (China) Hangzhou	7–8 July, (Germany) Hamburg	30 November – 1 December, (Argentina) Buenos Aires
SOA (OAS)	none		10–11 April, Panama City	none		13–14 April, (Peru) Lima
NALS	none	19 February, (Mexico) Toluca	none	29 June, (Canada) Ottawa	none	
APEC	7–8 October, (Indonesia) Bali	10–11 November, (China) Beijing	18–19 November, (Philippines) Manila	19–20 November, (Peru) Lima	10–11 November, (Vietnam) Da Nang	17–18 November, (Papua New Guinea) Port Moresby
██ = Did not attend / participate.

== See also ==
- 2012 Mexican general election
- Foreign relations of Mexico
- List of international presidential trips made by Andrés Manuel López Obrador, his successor
