= List of international presidential trips made by Andrés Manuel López Obrador =

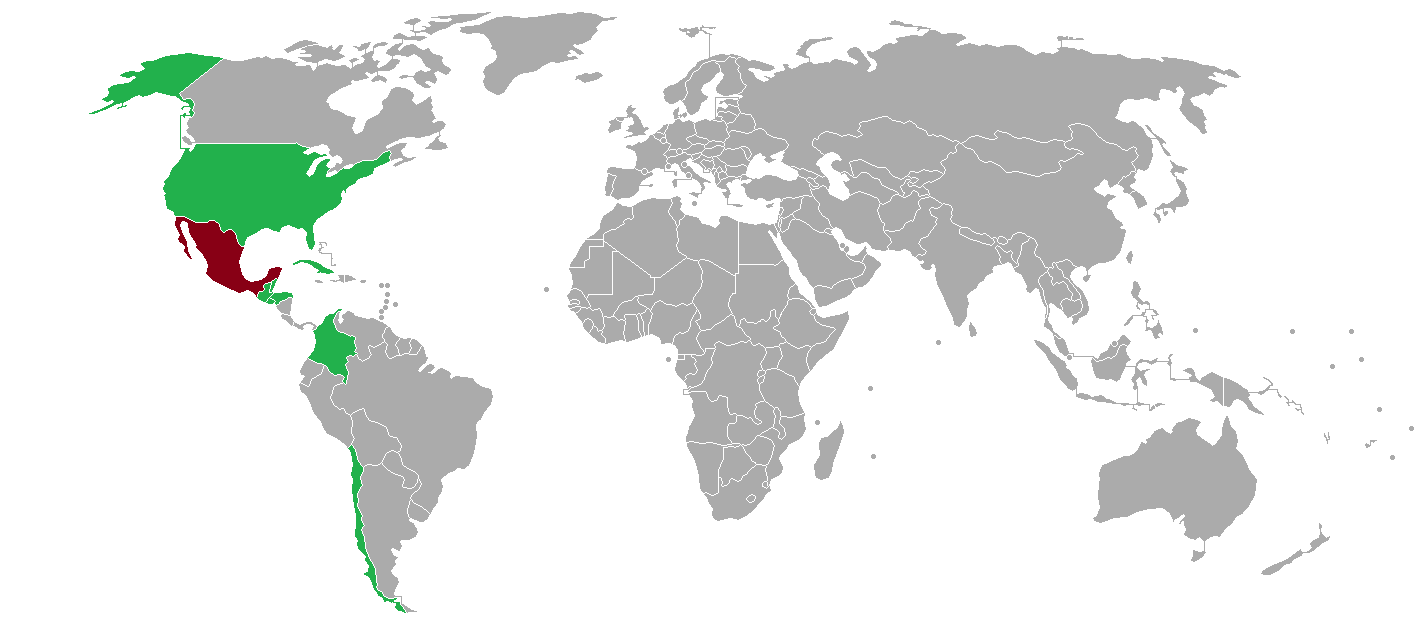
Countries visited by President Andrés Manuel López Obrador

This is a list of international presidential trips made by Andrés Manuel López Obrador, the 65th president of Mexico. Andrés Manuel López Obrador has made 7 international trips to 12 countries during his presidency from 1 December 2018 to 1 October 2024.

== Summary ==
The number of visits per country where President Obrador traveled are:

- One visit to Belize, Chile, Colombia, Cuba, El Salvador, Guatemala, Honduras
- Five visits to United States

== 2020 ==
	Country	Areas visited	Date(s)	Notes	Image
1	United States	Washington, D.C.	8 July	First international trip since assuming the presidency. He met with the President Donald Trump to discuss various matters of mutual interest to both countries, including the economy and immigration.	

== 2021 ==
	Country	Areas visited	Date(s)	Notes	Image
2	United States	New York City	8–9 November	He participated in the session of the United Nations Security Council on the occasion of the rotating presidency held by Mexico in this organization.	
3	United States	Washington, D.C.	18–19 November	Participated in the North American Leaders' Summit regarding the NAFTA. He met with the President of the United States, Joe Biden, and the Prime Minister of Canada, Justin Trudeau.	

== 2022 ==
	Country	Areas visited	Date(s)	Notes	Image
4	Guatemala	Guatemala City	5–8 May	State visit accompanied by the First Lady Beatriz Gutiérrez Müller. Meeting with the President Alejandro Giammattei to deepen political and economic ties with the neighboring country.	
4	El Salvador	San Salvador	5–8 May	State Visit. Meeting with the President of El Salvador Nayib Bukele to discuss various issues related to economics and regional integration.	
4	Honduras	Tegucigalpa	5–8 May	State Visit. Meeting with president Xiomara Castro.	
4	Belize	Belmopan	5–8 May	Brief state visit. He was received by Prime Minister Johnny Briceño and attended a lunch with his wife.	
4	Cuba	Havana	5–8 May	State visit. Last destination on the Central America/Caribbean itinerary. He met with the President Miguel Diaz-Canel, to discuss immigration, security, and bilateral cooperation between the two countries.	
5	United States	Washington, D.C.	11–12 July	Official visit. Meeting with President Joe Biden at the White House to discuss bilateral issues between Mexico and the United States, such as immigration and economic issues. He met with Vice President Kamala Harris. He also participated in meetings with Mexican and American business leaders.	

== 2023 ==
	Country	Areas visited	Date(s)	Notes	Image
6	Colombia	Cali	8–9 September	He participated in a special CELAC meeting on drug trafficking in Latin America. He met with the President Gustavo Petro.	
6	Chile	Santiago	10–11 September	He participated in the celebrations in memory of the 1973 Chilean coup d'état at the invitation of the President Gabriel Boric.	
7	United States	San Francisco	15–17 November	He travelled to San Francisco to attend the APEC summit.	

== Multilateral meetings ==
Multilateral meetings of the following intergovernmental organizations took place during Andrés Manuel López Obrador's presidency (2018–2024).

Group	Year				
Group	2019	2020	2021	2022	2023
G20	28–29 June, (Japan) Osaka	21–22 November, (virtual) (Saudi Arabia) Riyadh	30–31 October, (Italy) Rome	15–16 November, (Indonesia) Bali	9–10 September, (India) New Delhi
SOA (OAS)	none			8–10 June, (United States) Los Angeles	none
NALS	none		18 November, (United States) Washington	none	10 January, Mexico City
APEC	16–17 November, (canceled) (Chile) Santiago	20 November, (virtual) (Malaysia) Kuala Lumpur	12 November, (virtual) (New Zealand) Auckland	18–19 November, (Thailand) Bangkok	15–17 November, (United States) San Francisco
██ = Did not attend / participate.

== See also ==
- 2018 Mexican general election
- Foreign relations of Mexico
- List of international presidential trips made by Enrique Peña Nieto, his predecessor
- List of international presidential trips made by Claudia Sheinbaum, his successor
