= List of international presidential trips made by Claudia Sheinbaum =

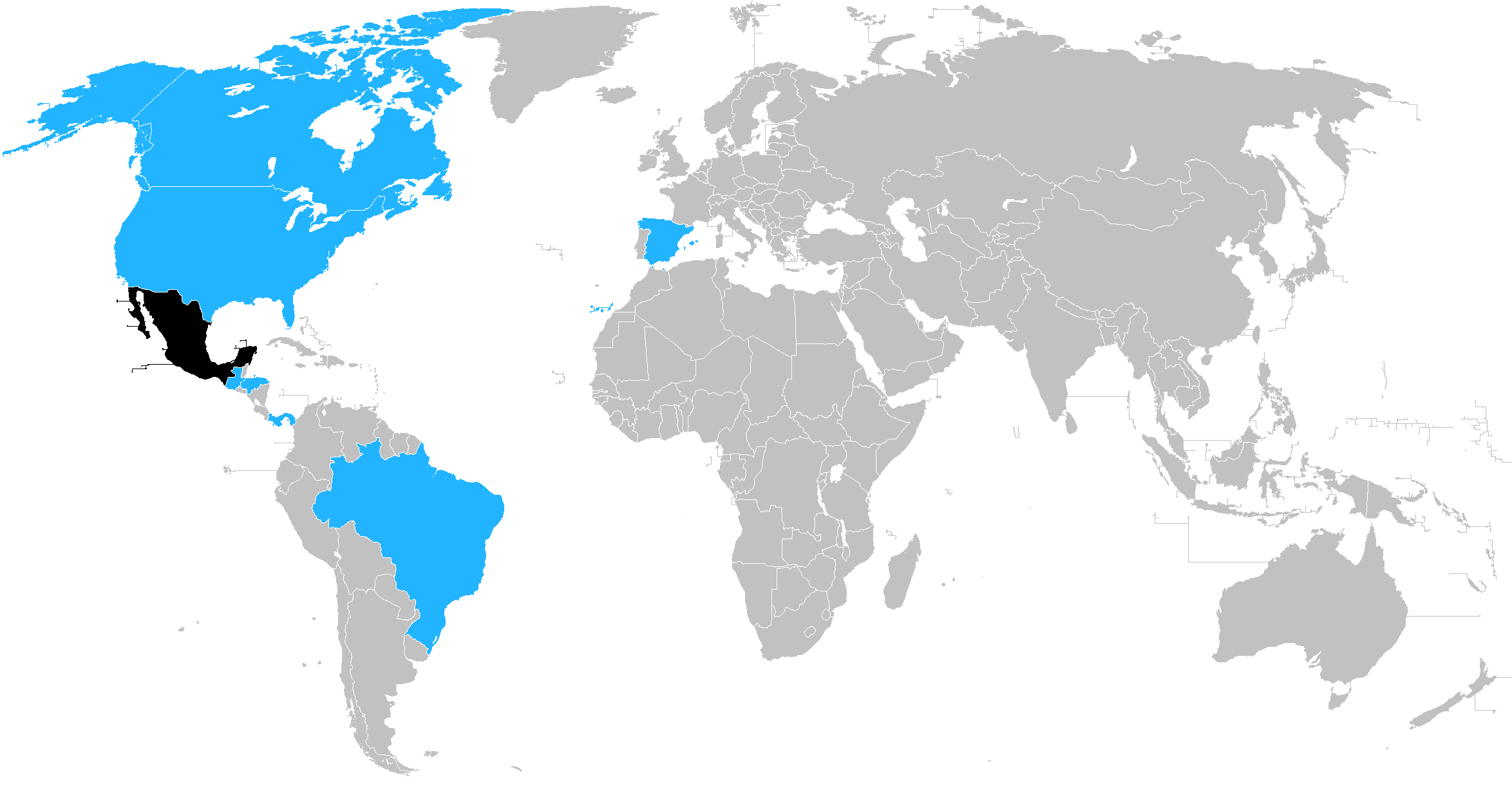
Countries visited by President Claudia Sheinbaum

This is a list of international presidential trips made by Claudia Sheinbaum, the 66th and current president of Mexico. Claudia Sheinbaum has made 7 international trips to 8 countries during her presidency so far, which began on 1 October 2024.

According to Article 88 of the Constitution of Mexico, the president may leave the country for up to seven days by informing the Senate or, where applicable, the Permanent Commission in advance of the reasons for the absence, as well as of the results of the measures carried out. For absences longer than seven days, permission from the Senate or the Permanent Commission is required.

== Summary ==
The number of visits per country where President Sheinbaum traveled are:

- Two visits to the United States
- One visit to Brazil, Canada, Honduras, Guatemala, Panama, Spain, and China

== 2024 ==
	Country	Areas visited	Dates	Details	Image
1	Panama	Panama City	17 November	Stopover on the way to Brazil. Met with Minister of Foreign Affairs Javier Martínez-Acha.	
1	Brazil	Rio de Janeiro	18-19 November	Attended the 2024 G20 Rio de Janeiro summit.	

== 2025 ==
	Country	Areas visited	Dates	Details	Image
2	Honduras	Tegucigalpa	8-9 April	Attended the CELAC summit.	
3	Canada	Kananaskis	16-17 June	Attended the 51st G7 summit.	
4	Guatemala	Petén Department	15 August	Meeting with Guatemalan President Bernardo Arévalo	
5	United States	Washington, D.C.	5 December	Attended the World Cup Draw. Held a trilateral meeting with U.S President Donald Trump and Canadian Prime Minister Mark Carney.	

== 2026 ==
	Country	Areas visited	Dates	Details	Image
6	Spain	Barcelona	17-19 April	Attended the Defense of Democracy summit and met with Prime Minister Pedro Sanchez.	
7	United States	East Rutherford	19-20 July 2026	Attended the 2026 FIFA World Cup final at MetLife Stadium in New Jersey, alongside US President Donald Trump and Canadian Prime Minister Mark Carney.	
8	China	Shenzhen	16-19 November 2026	Attended the APEC summit.	

== Planned trips ==
Country	Planned area to visit	Dates	Details
United States	Miami	14–15 December 2026	Attending the G20 summit

== See also ==
- Foreign relations of Mexico
- List of international presidential trips made by Andrés Manuel López Obrador, her predecessor

== Multilateral meetings ==
Group	Year						
Group	2024	2025	2026	2027	2028	2029	2030
G20	18–19 November, (Brazil) Rio de Janeiro	22–23 November, (South Africa) Johannesburg	14–15 December, (United States) Miami	TBD; United Kingdom	TBD; South Korea	TBA	TBA
SOA (OAS)	None	None	TBD (Dominican Republic) Punta Cana	TBA	TBA	TBA	TBA
NALS	None	None	TBA	TBA	TBA	TBA	TBA
APEC	15–16 November, (Peru) Lima	31 October – 1 November, (South Korea) Gyeongju	18–19 November, (China) Shenzhen	TBD; Vietnam	TBD; Mexico	TBA	
CELAC		8–9 April, (Honduras) Tegucigalpa	TBA	TBA	TBA	TBA	TBA
Defense of Democracy		21 July, (Chile) Santiago	18 April, (Spain) Barcelona	TBA, (Mexico) TBA	TBA	TBA	TBA
Others	None	G7; 16–17 June, (Canada) Kananaskis					
██ = Future event ██ = Did not attend / participate.
