= 2015 G20 Antalya summit =

International summit held in Turkey

2015 G20 Antalya summit 10th G20 summit
- 15–17 November 2015
- Host country: Turkey
- Motto: Collective Action for Inclusive and Robust Growth
- Cities: Serik, Antalya
- Venues: Regnum Carya Golf & Spa Resort
- Participants: G20 members.::. Guest invitees: Azerbaijan; Bangladesh; Malaysia; Qatar”; Senegal; Singapore; Spain; Zimbabwe
- Chair: Recep Tayyip Erdoğan

The 2015 G20 Antalya summit was the tenth meeting of the G20 heads of government/heads of state. It was held in Belek, Antalya Province, Turkey. The venue for the Leaders Summit was Regnum Carya Hotel Convention Centre at the Regnum Carya Golf & Resort Spa.

Turkey officially took over the presidency of the G20 from Australia on 1 December 2014, and China preside over the summit in 2016.

== The Summit Conference ==
=== Background ===
The Antalya summit is the 10th edition of the G20 leaders' meeting. Together, the G20 represent around 90% of global GDP, 80% of global trade and two-thirds of the world’s population.

This year, Turkey holds the rotating Presidency of the G20. The G20 members are Argentina, Australia, Brazil, Canada, China, France, Germany, Italy, India, Indonesia, Japan, Mexico, Republic of Korea, Russia, Saudi Arabia, South Africa, Turkey, the United Kingdom, the United States and the European Union. The European Union thus is a full member of the G20 and is represented at G20 summits by the President of the European Commission and the President of the European Council. The G20 members have invited Spain as a permanent invitee. Additionally, Zimbabwe was invited as they are the 2015 chair of the African Union, Malaysia was invited as they are the 2015 Chair of the Association of South-East Asian Nations (ASEAN), Senegal was representing the New Partnership for Africa's Development, and Azerbaijan and Singapore were also invited.

The 11th edition of the G20 summit hosted by China in Hangzhou, in 2016.

=== Agenda ===
To discuss the world's biggest political and security crises, including Syria and the mass migration of refugees.

=== Preparatory meetings ===
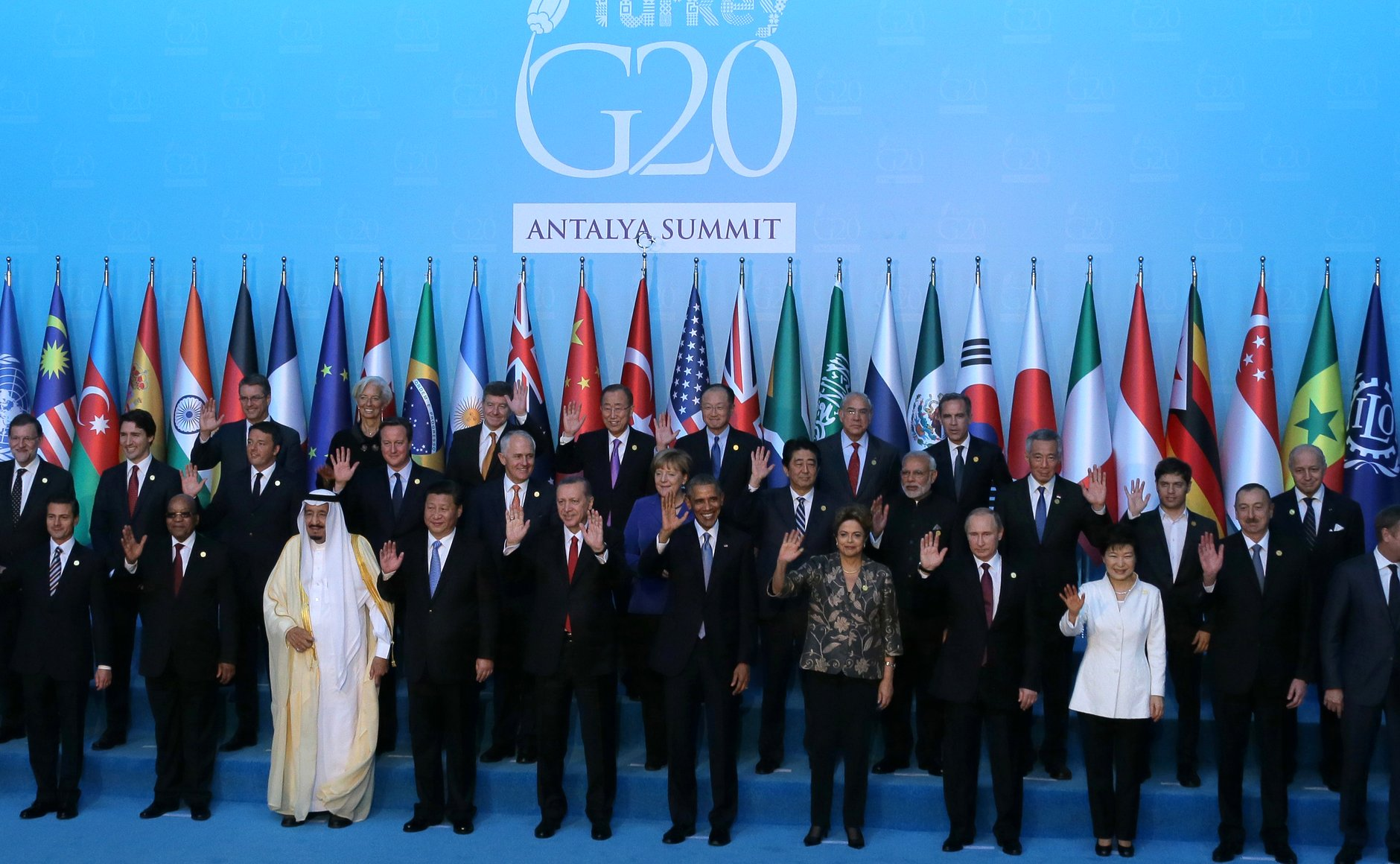
World leaders at the summit.

In September 2015, U.S. Secretary of the Treasury Jack Lew planned to visit Turkey, as did his Chinese and other G20 finance minister counterparts and central bankers. Throughout the year leading up to the November summit, preparatory and regular meetings, many in locations in Turkey this year, on Women-20, Youth-20, Energy in Sub-Saharan Africa, The silver economy, Islamic finance, tourism, agriculture and other subjects have convened or, as of September, were planned.

=== Results ===
The G20 summit was mostly focused on political rather than economic issues due to the terrorist attacks in Paris, in which 130 people were killed. As an organization dealing with global issues of financial and economic cooperation, the G20 decided to change the format of the session. Nevertheless, the format has always been efficient enough so we can expect success in the implementation of the decisions, taken during the summit.

According to the summit results, in addition to the pre-planned communiqué, the parties adopted a declaration on fighting terrorism. "We condemn in the most serious way the heinous terrorist attacks in Paris on November 13 and in Ankara on October 10th. They are unacceptable insults to all humanity," read a joint G20 statement. The heads of state expressed their readiness to fight terrorism in all its forms, including taking steps to resist economic terrorism.

"The fight against terrorism is a major priority for all of our countries and we reiterate our resolve to work together to prevent and suppress terrorist acts through increased international solidarity and cooperation," read the joint statement. "We extend our deepest condolences to the victims of terrorist attacks and their families. We reaffirm our solidarity and resolve in the fight against terrorism in all its forms and wherever it occurs."

Some other issues, such as how the world working together to boost the world economy were also discussed during the conference.

== Participating leaders ==
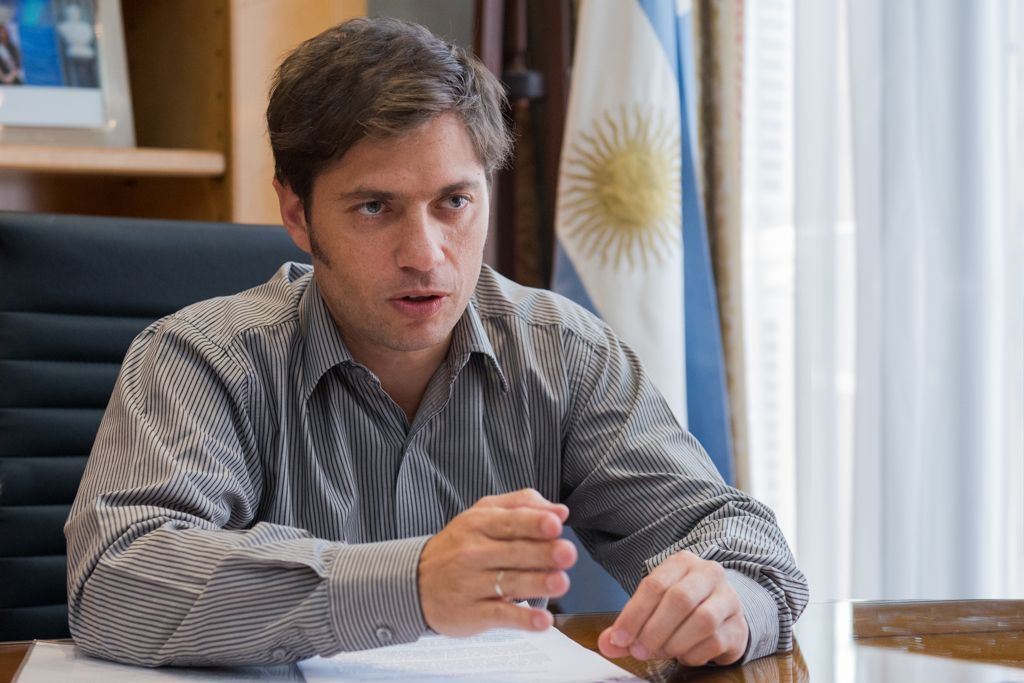
Argentina
Axel Kicillof, Minister of the Economy

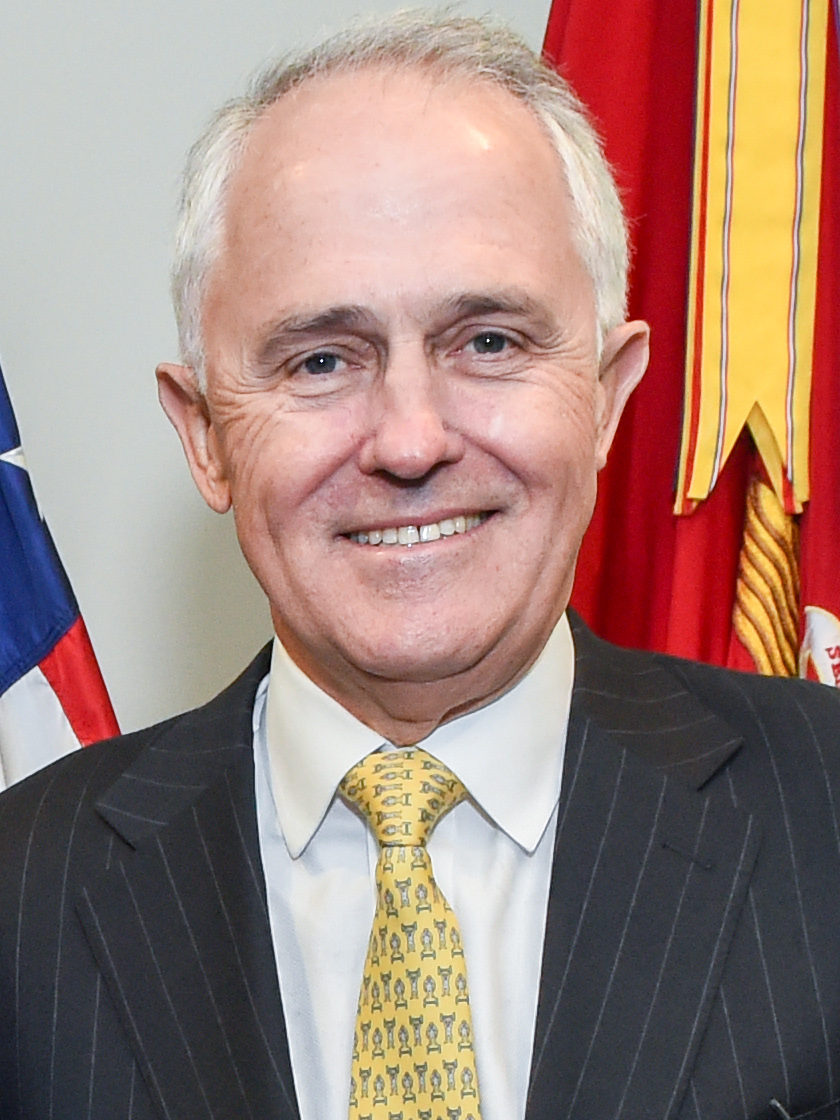
Australia
Malcolm Turnbull, Prime Minister

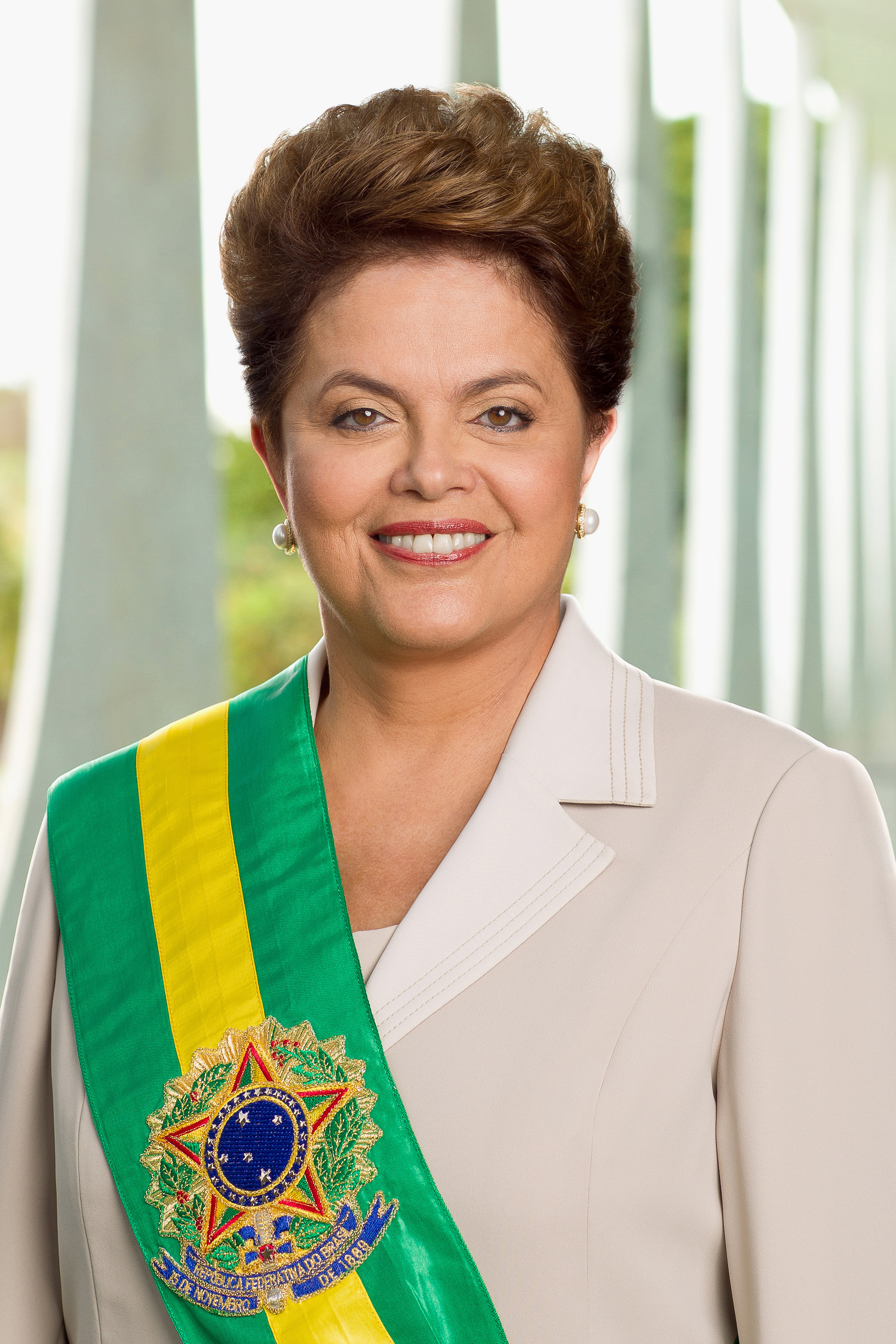
Brazil
Dilma Rousseff, President

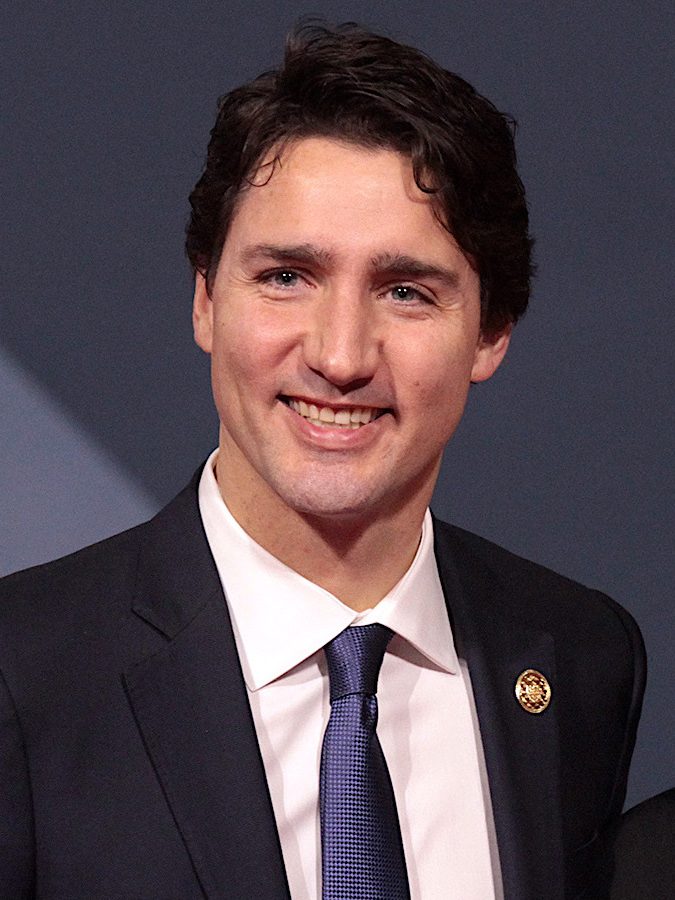
Canada
Justin Trudeau, Prime Minister

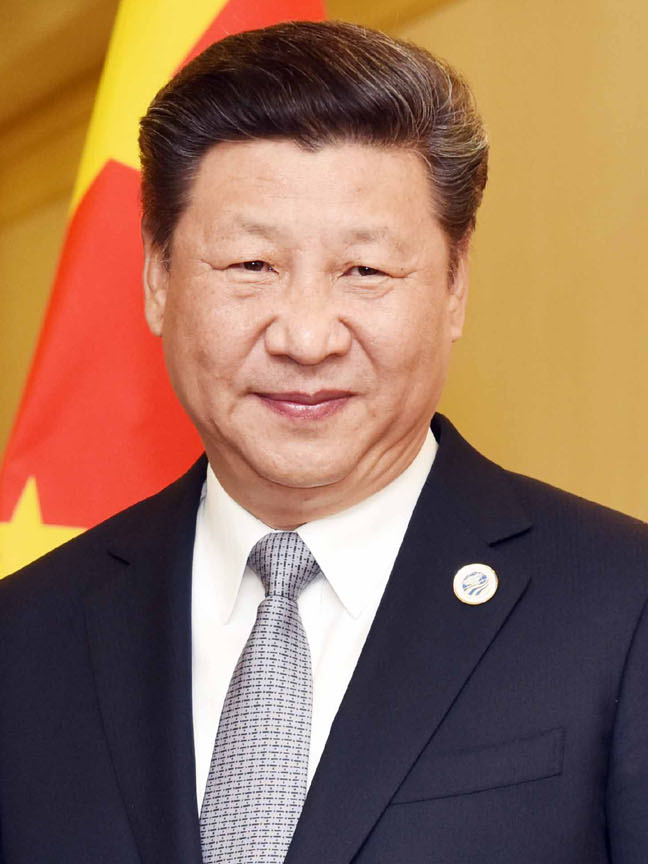
China
Xi Jinping, President

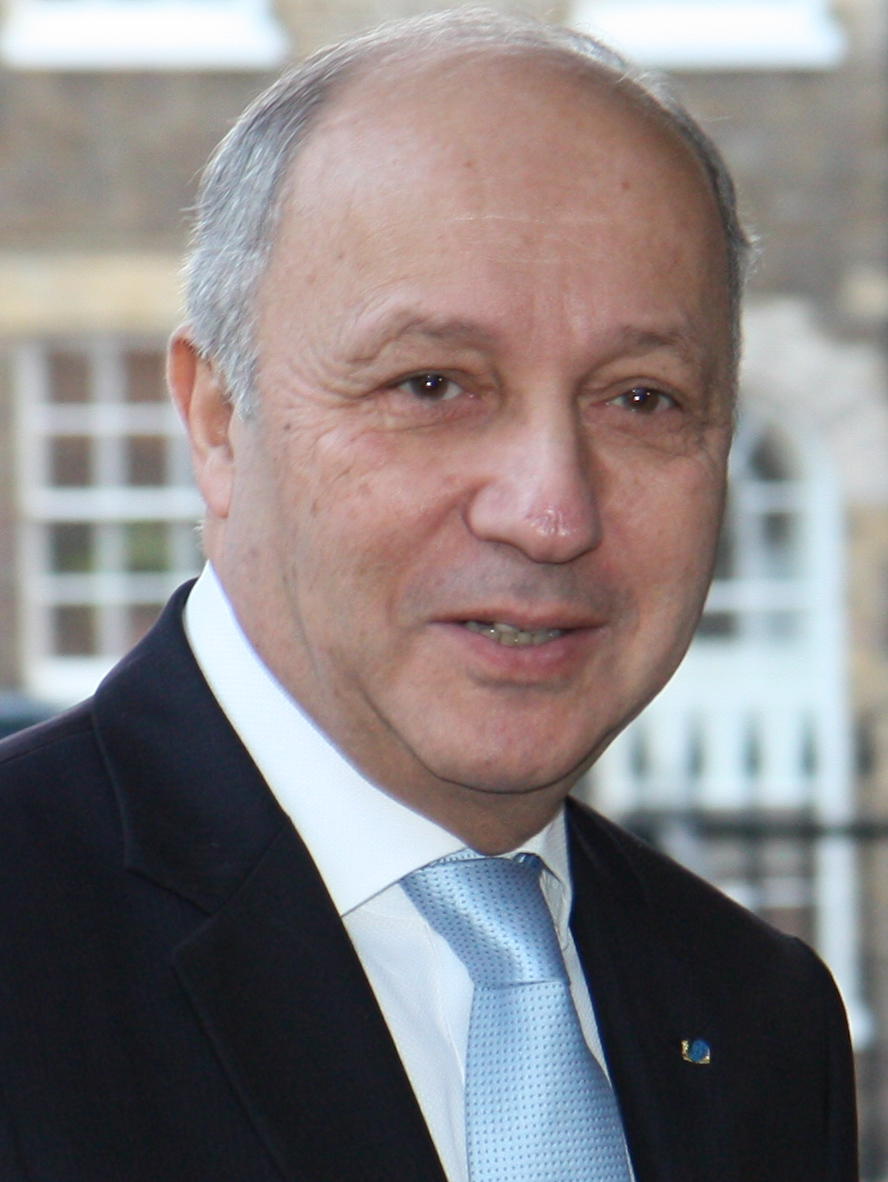
France
Laurent Fabius, Minister of Foreign Affairs and International Development

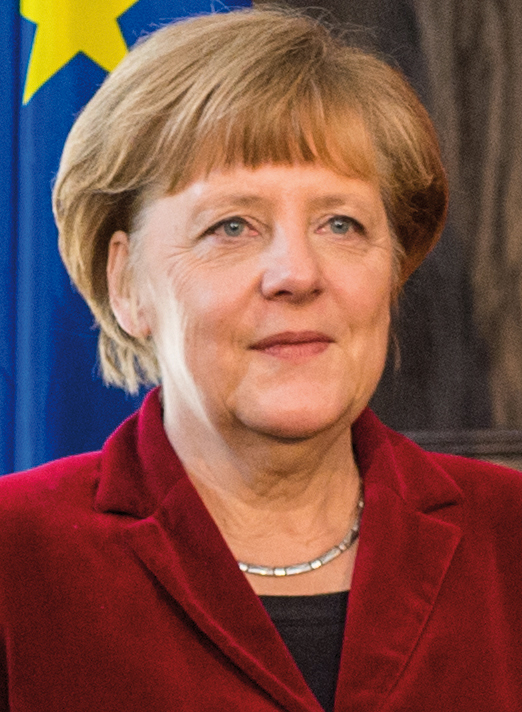
Germany
Angela Merkel, Chancellor

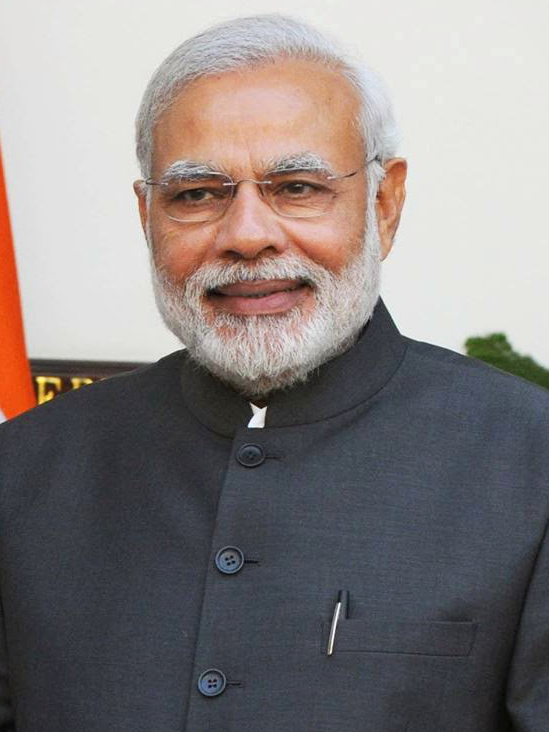
India
Narendra Modi, Prime Minister

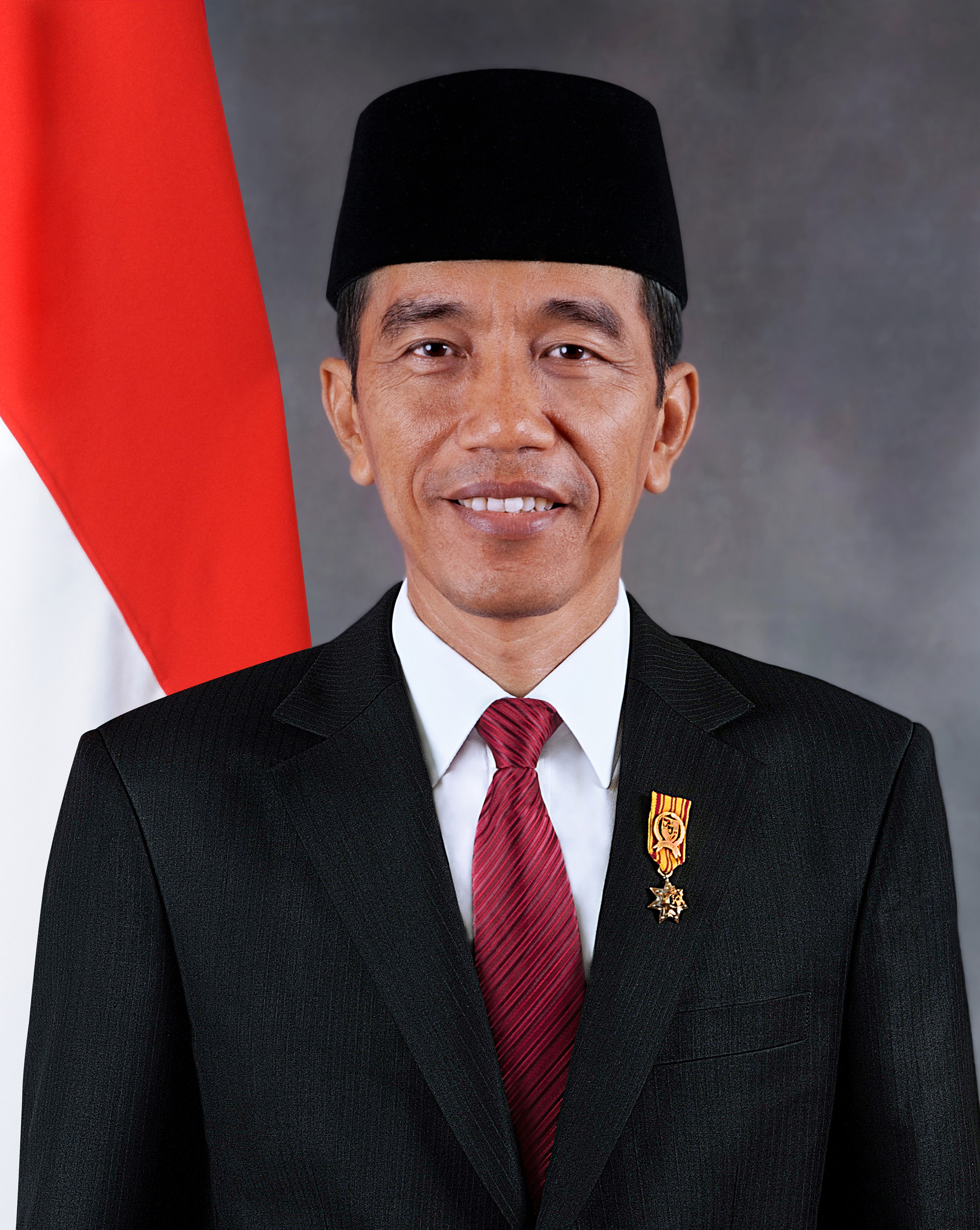
Indonesia
Joko Widodo, President

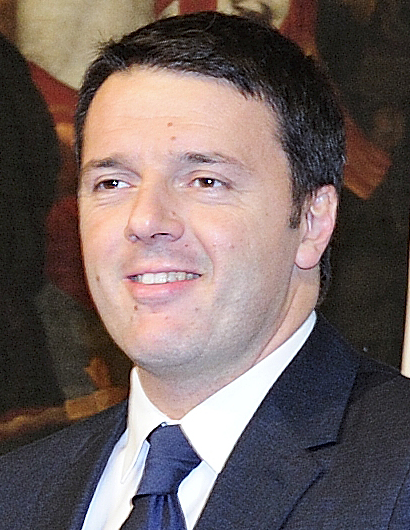
Italy
Matteo Renzi, Prime Minister

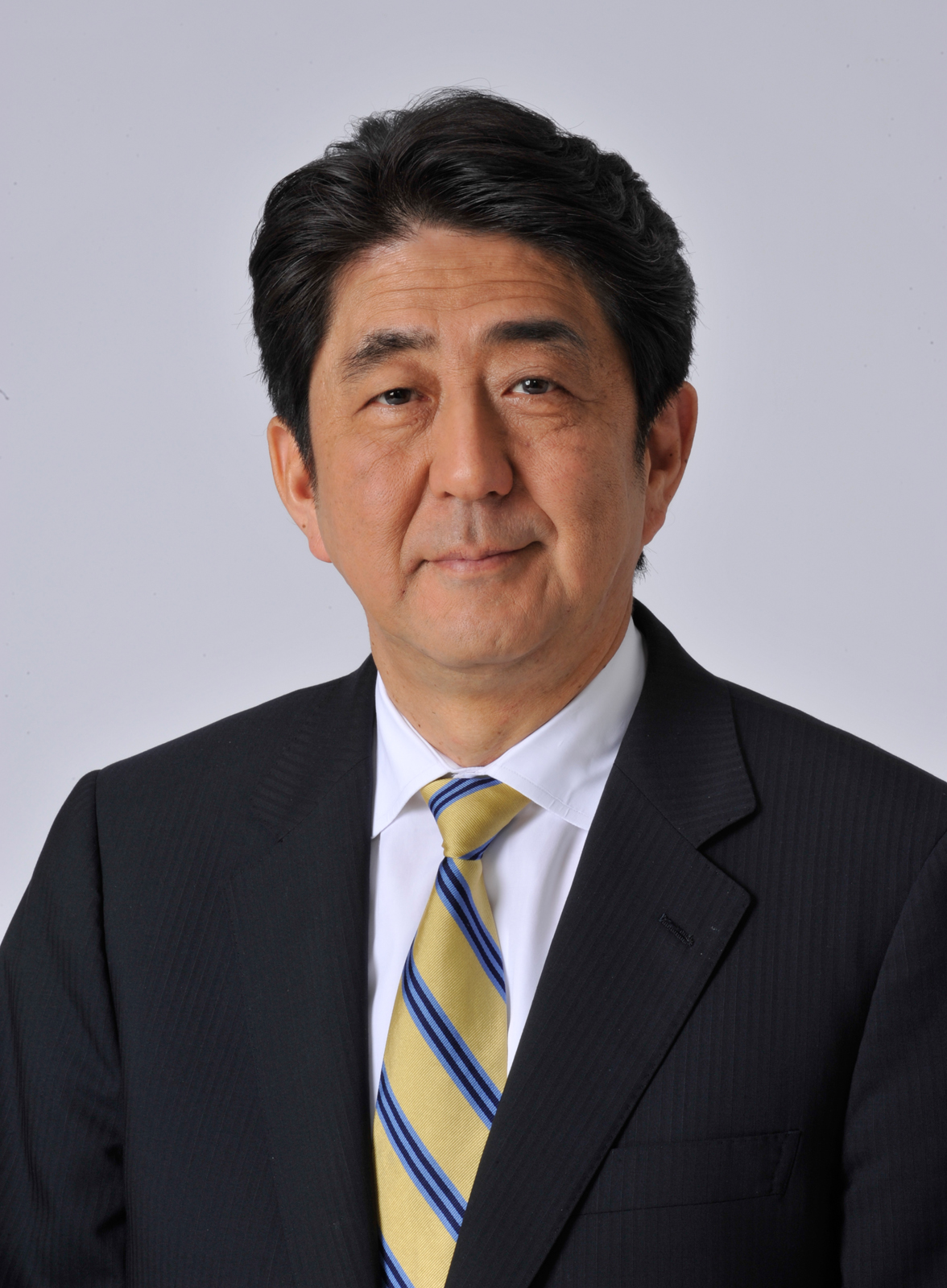
Japan
Shinzō Abe, Prime Minister

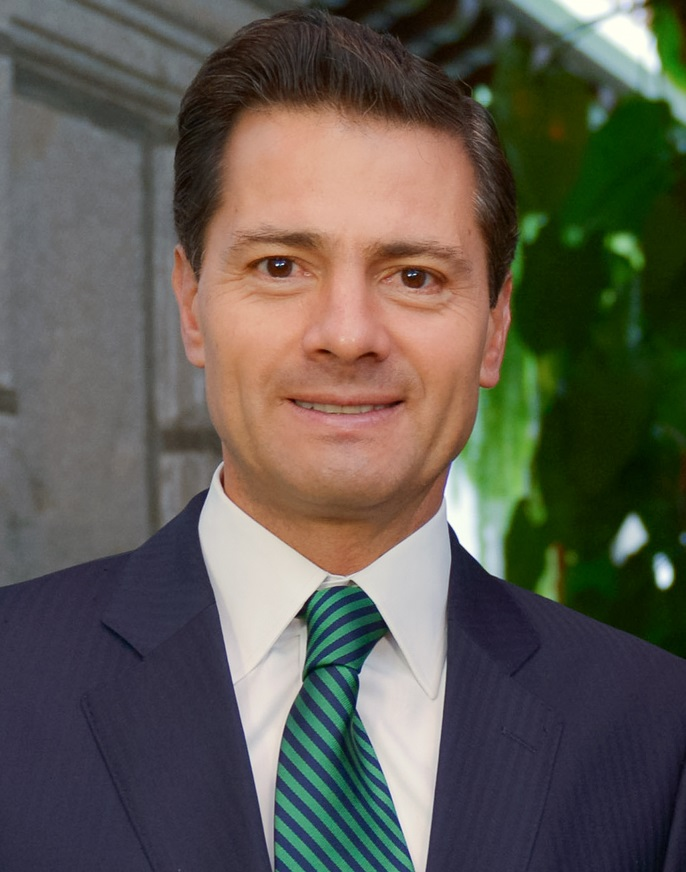
Mexico
Enrique Peña Nieto, President

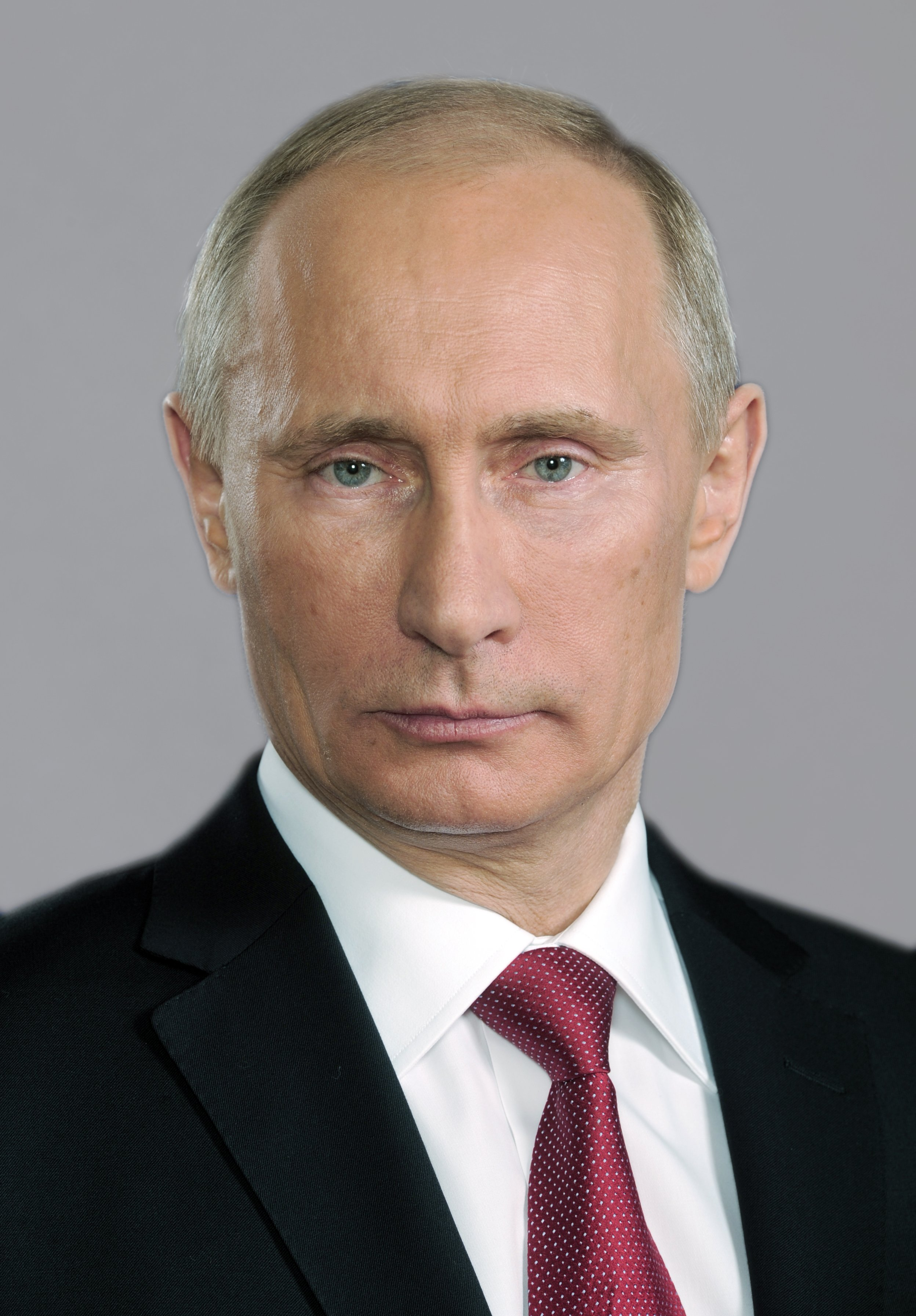
Russia
Vladimir Putin, President

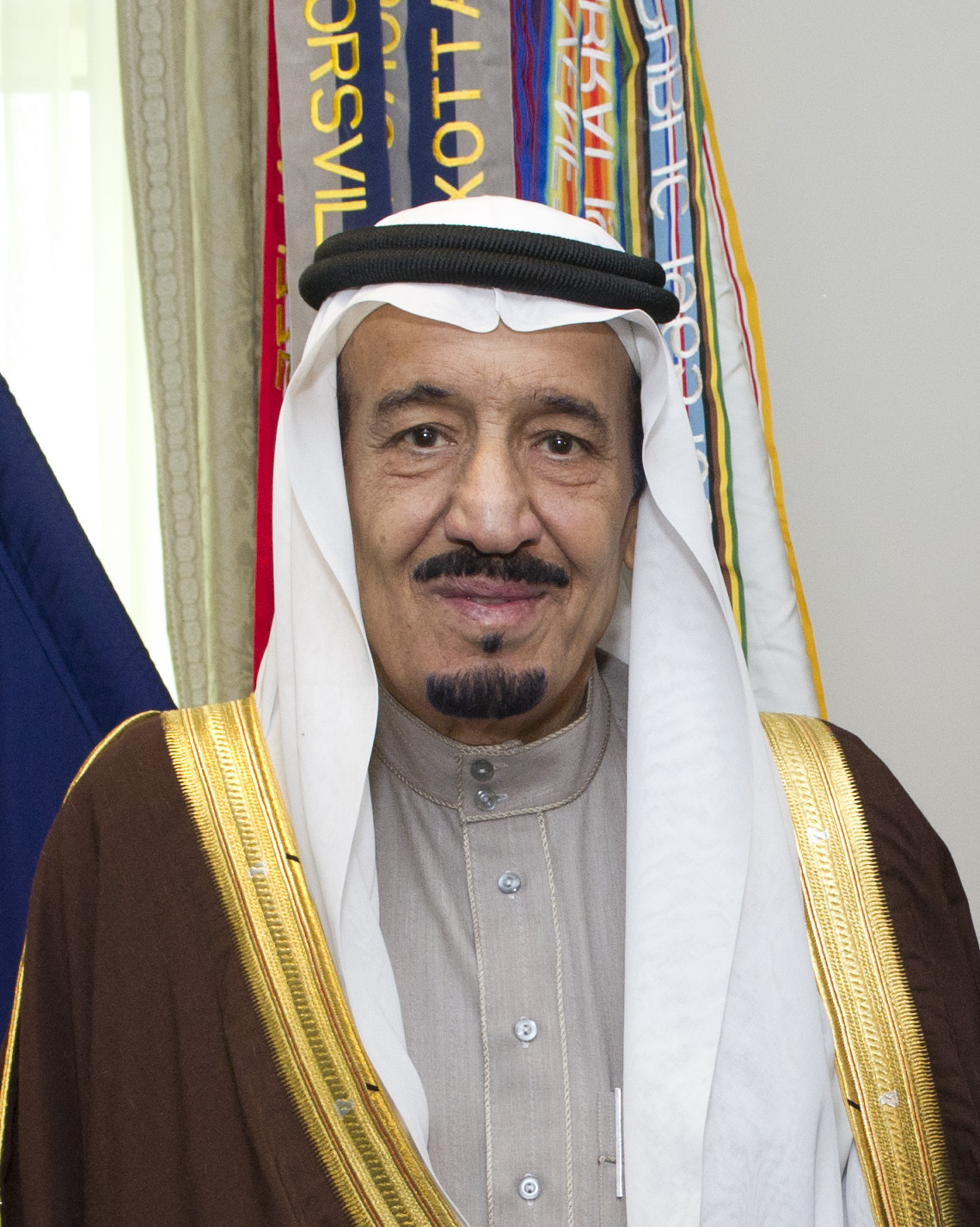
Saudi Arabia
Salman, King

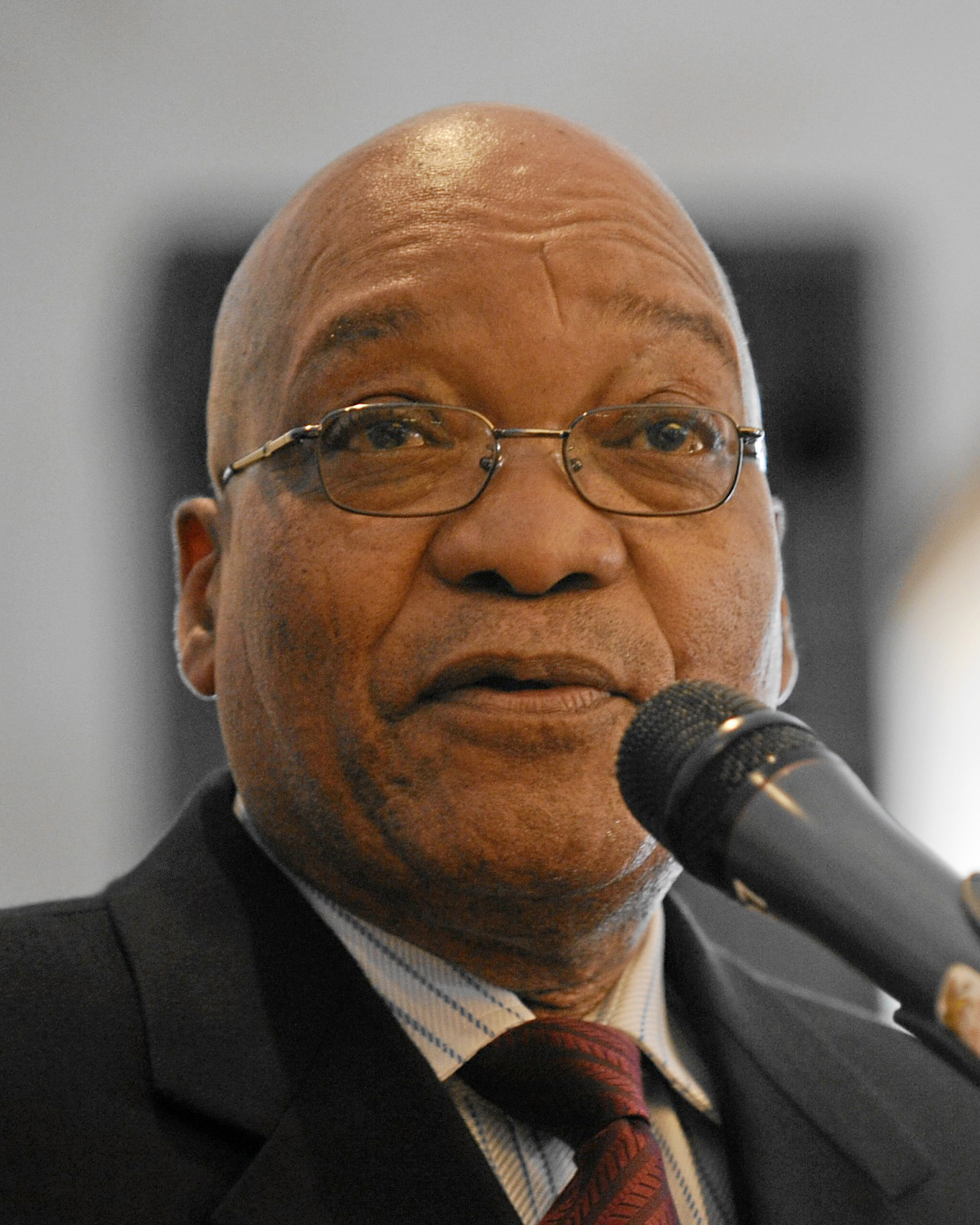
South Africa
Jacob Zuma, President

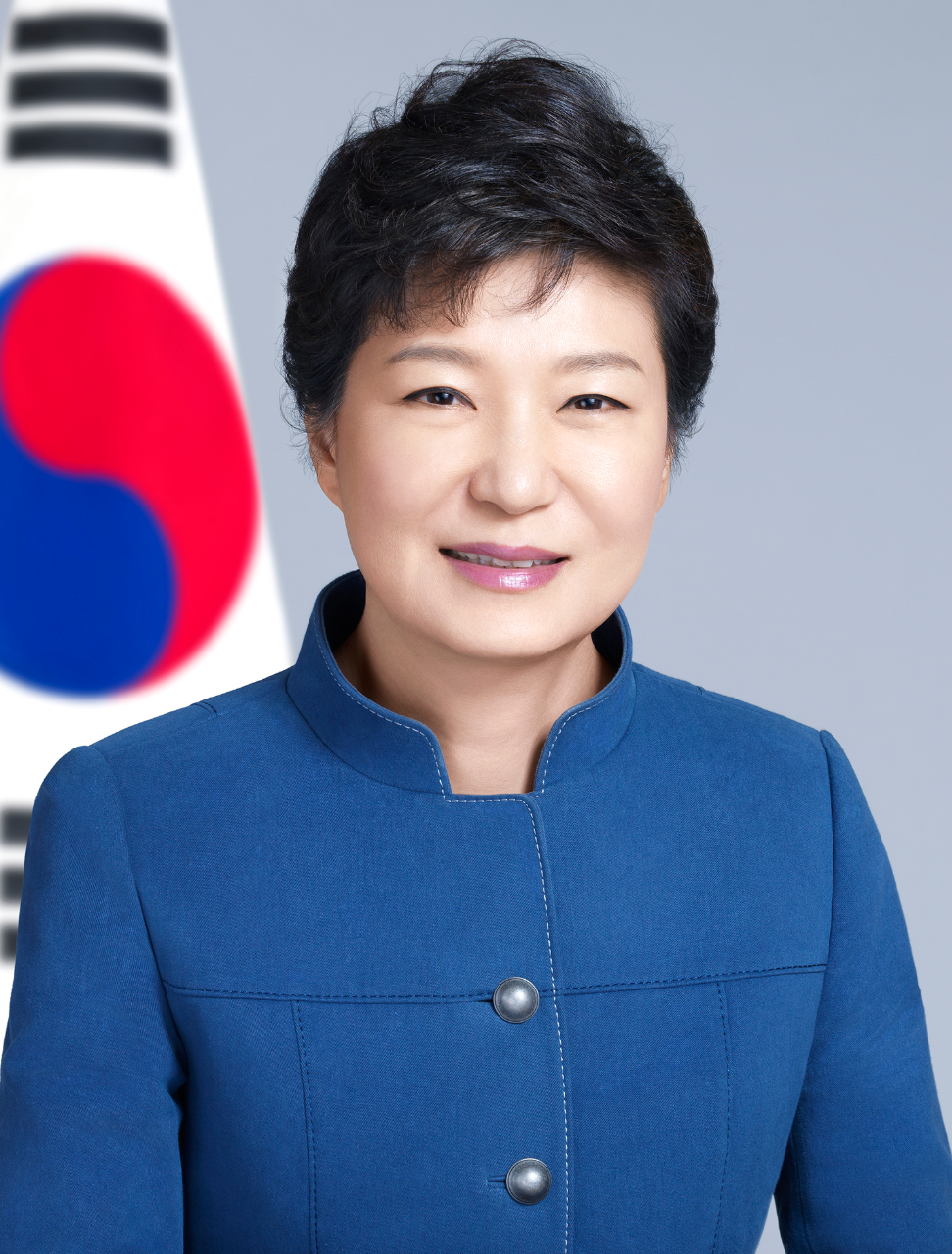
Republic of Korea
Park Geun-hye, President

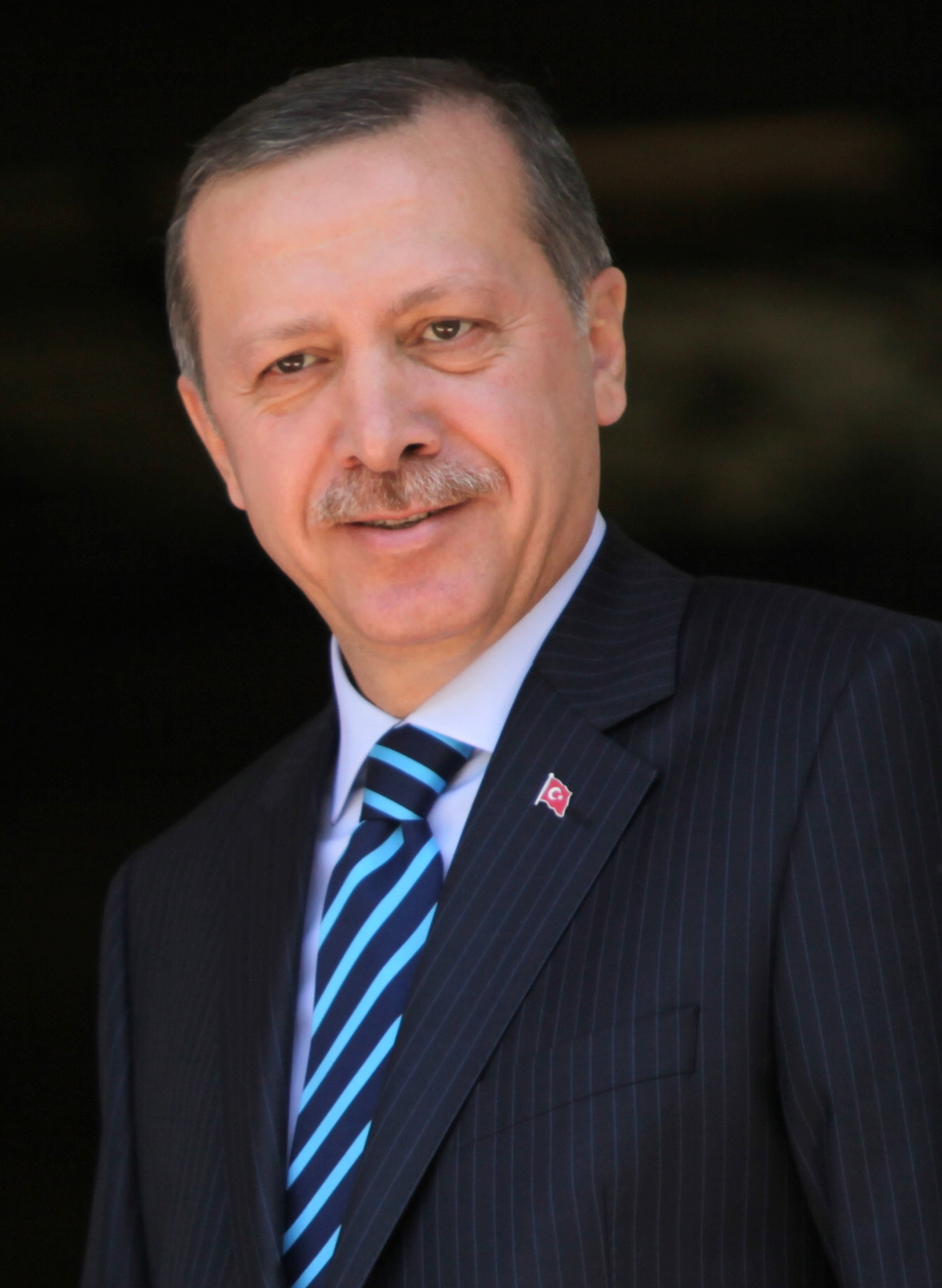
Turkey
Recep Tayyip Erdoğan, President (Host)

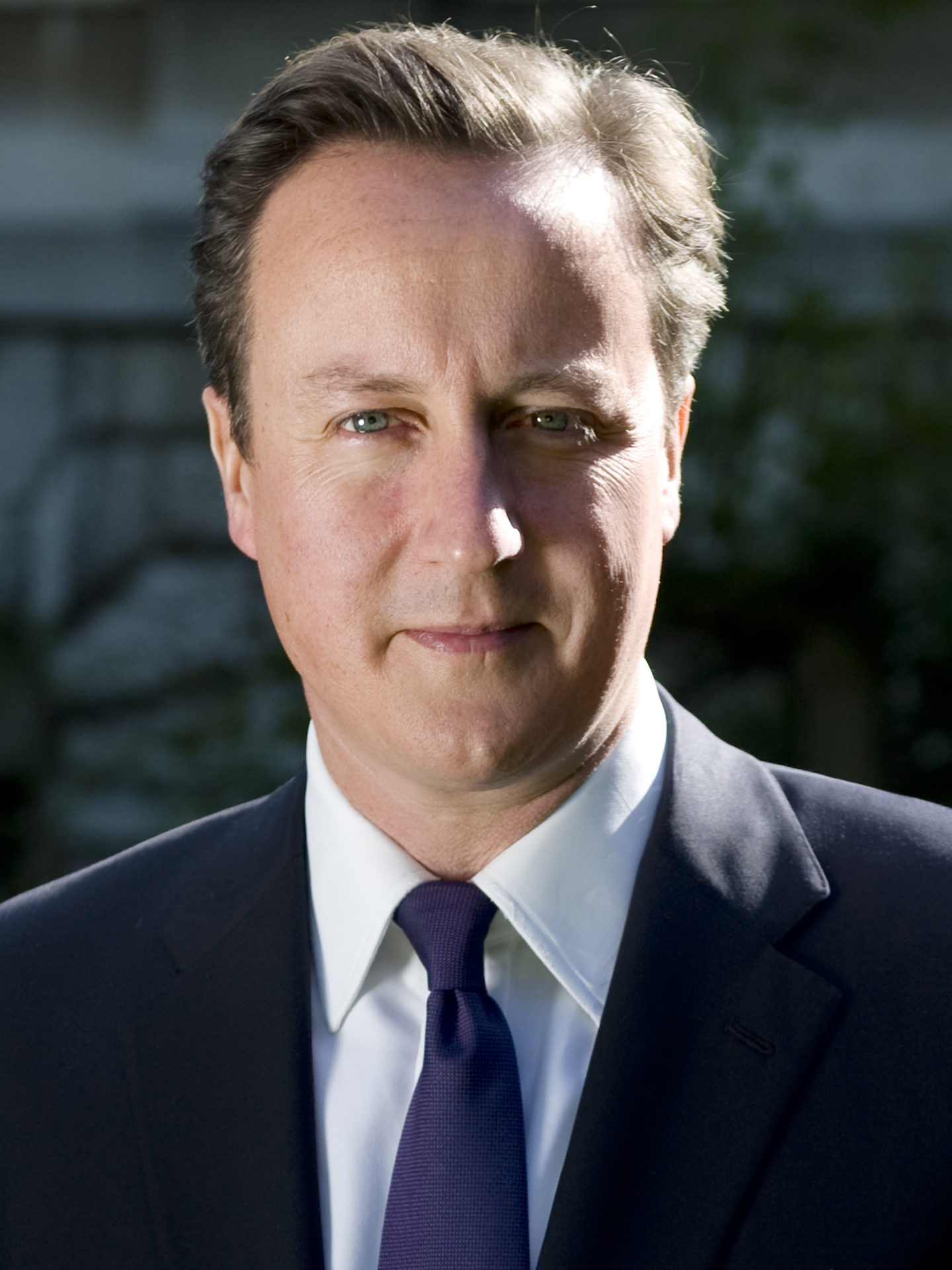
United Kingdom
David Cameron, Prime Minister

United States
Barack Obama, President

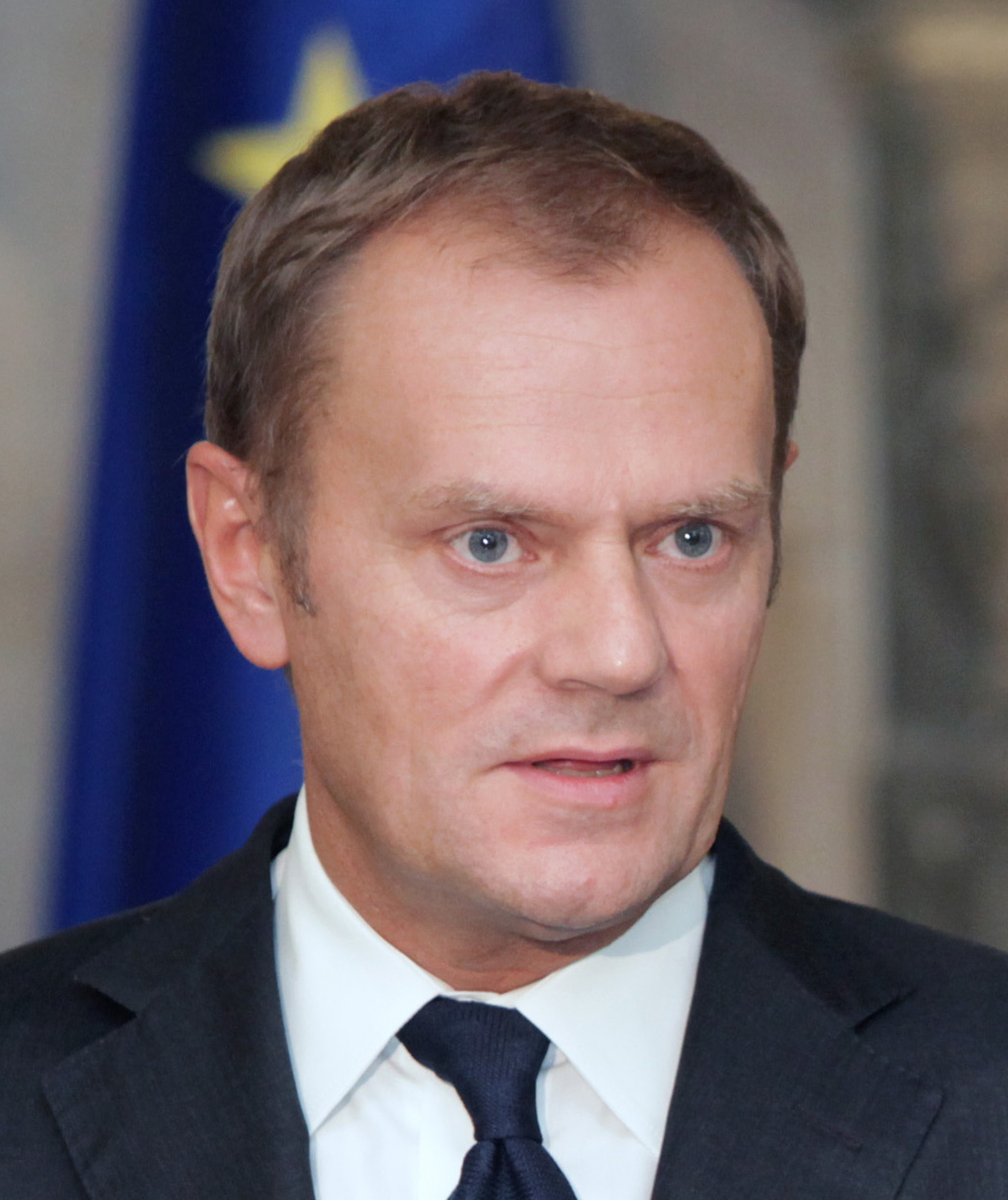
European Union
Donald Tusk, President of the European Council

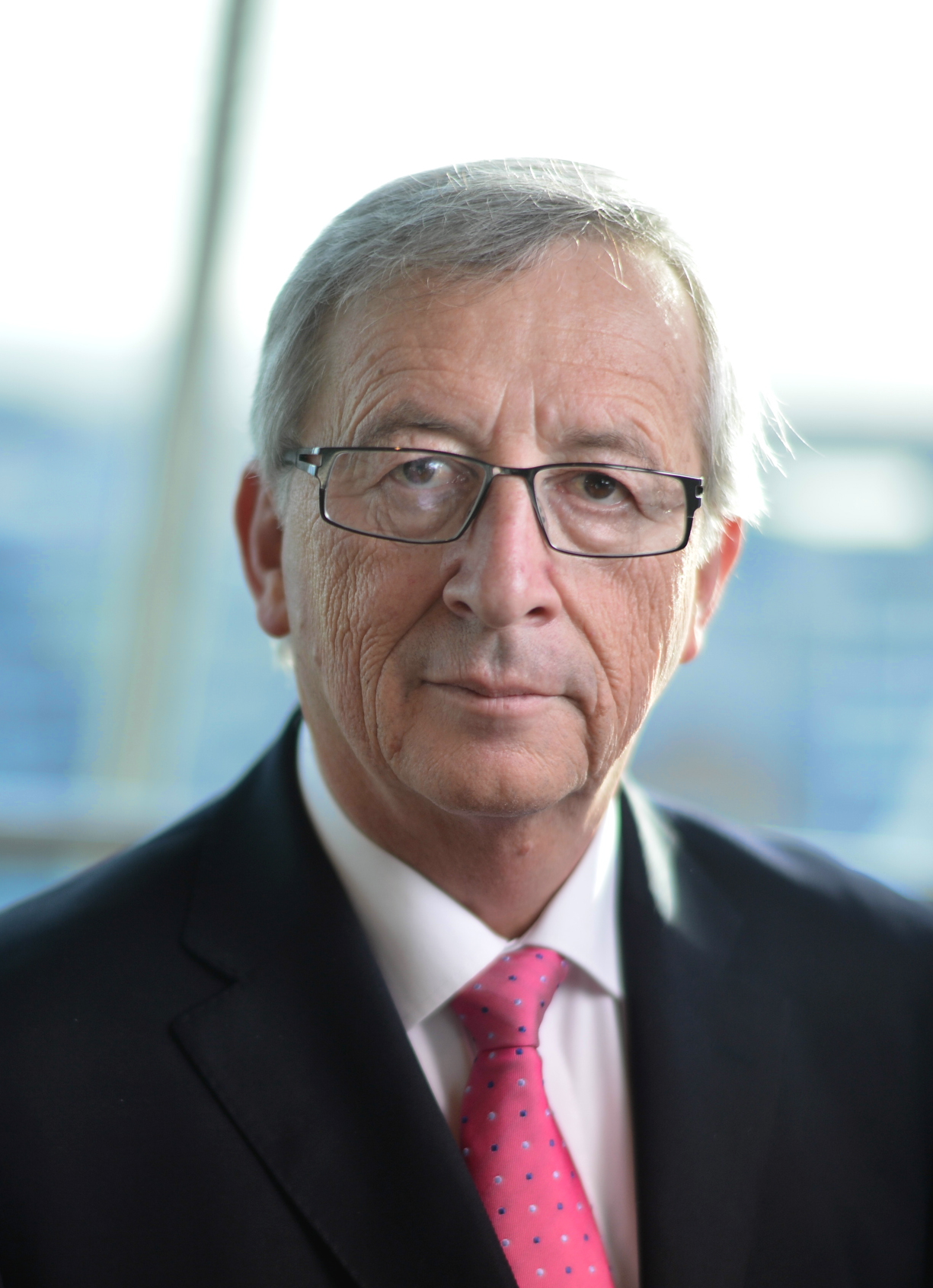
European Union
Jean-Claude Juncker, President of the European Commission

=== Invited guests ===
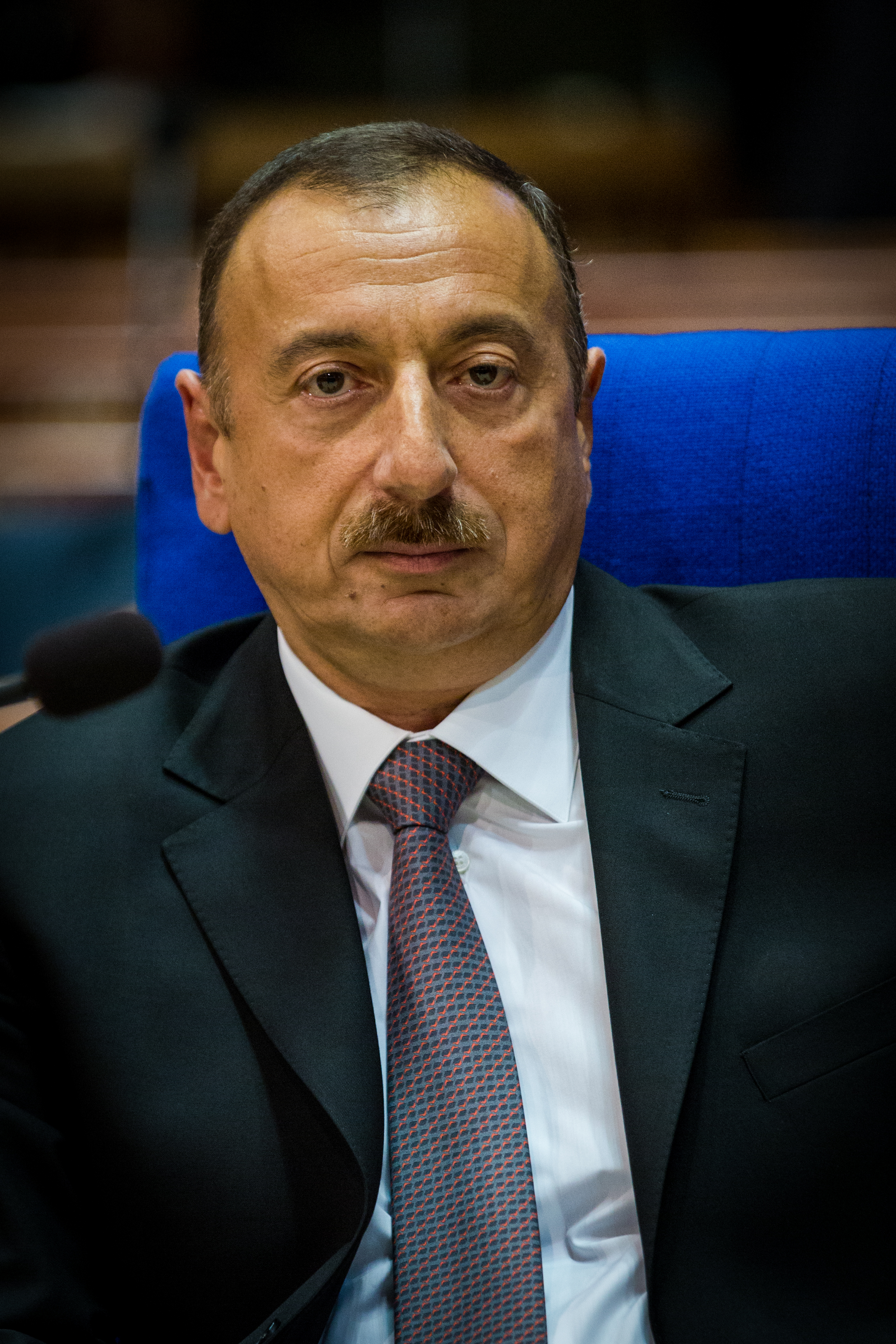
Azerbaijan
Ilham Aliyev, President

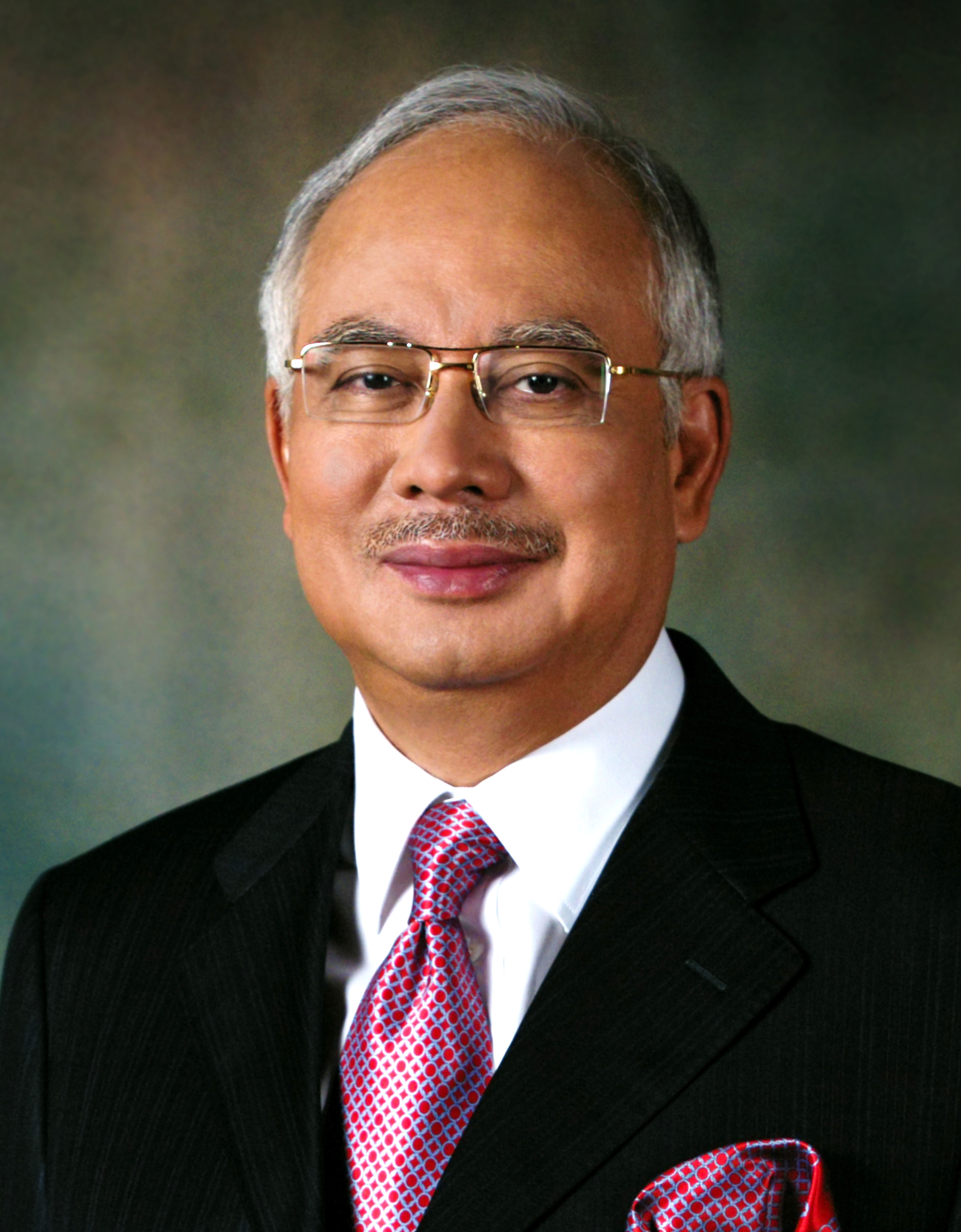
Malaysia
Najib Razak, Prime Minister, 2015 Chair of ASEAN

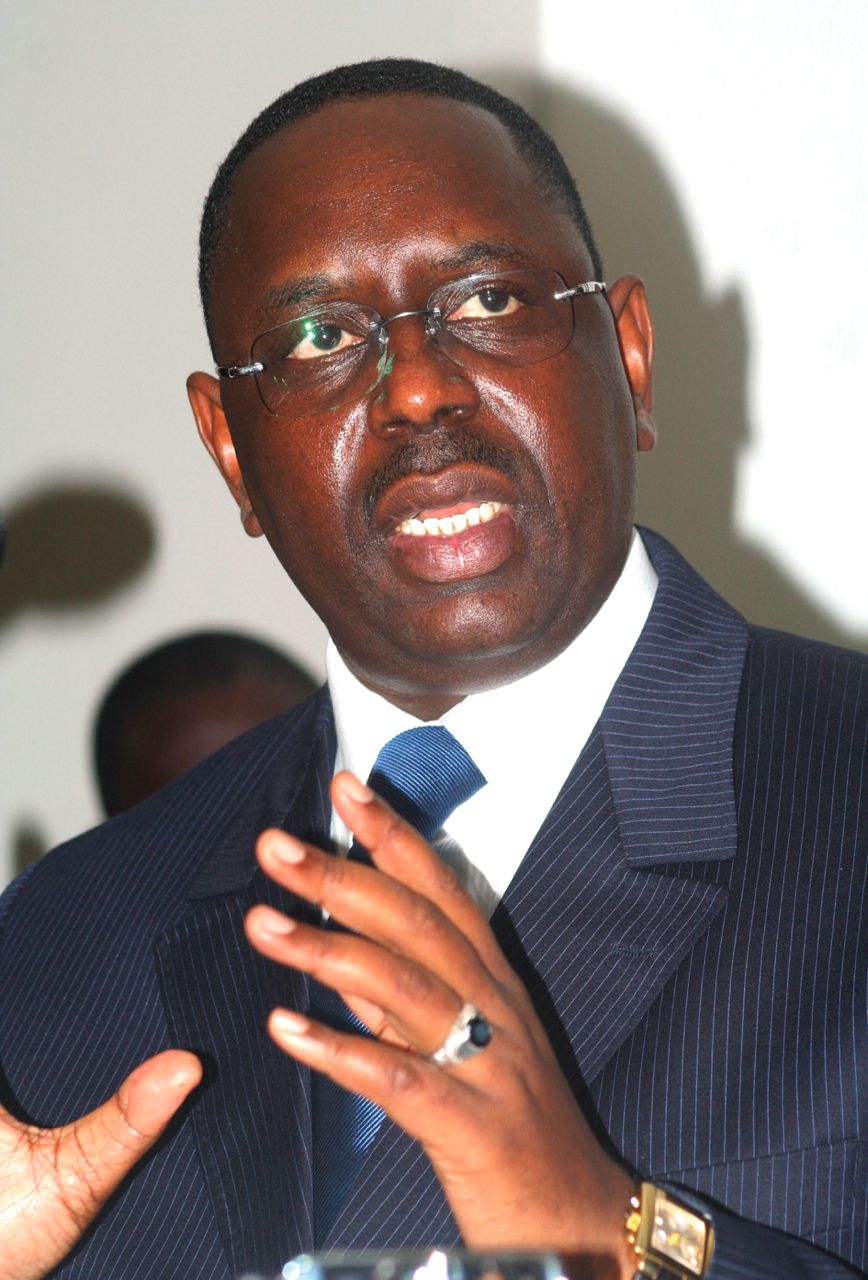
Senegal
Macky Sall, President, representative of NEPAD

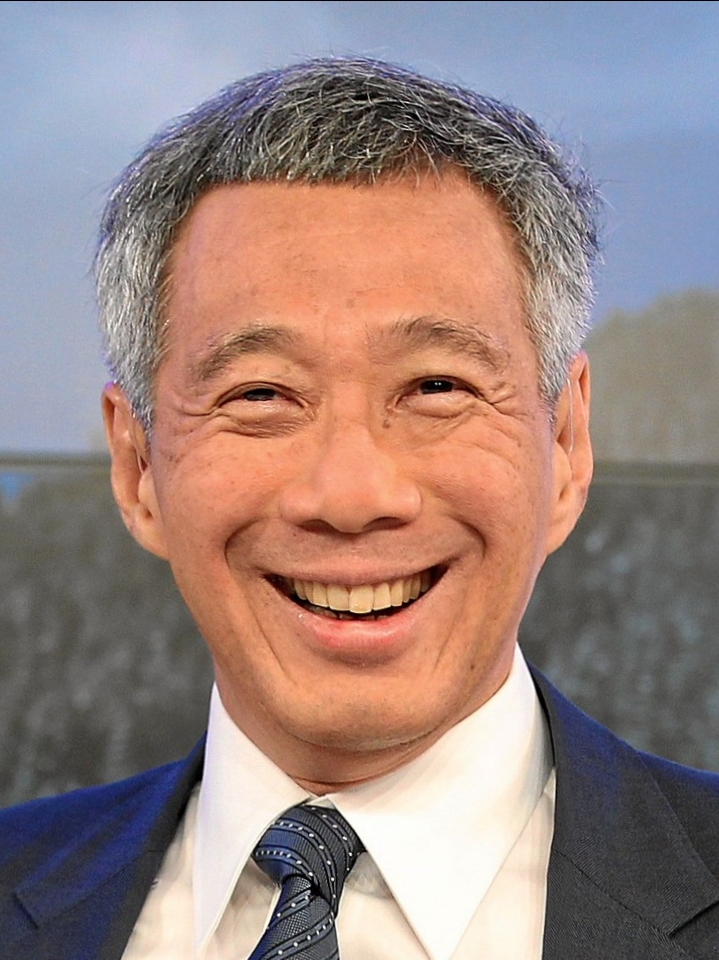
Singapore
Lee Hsien Loong, Prime Minister

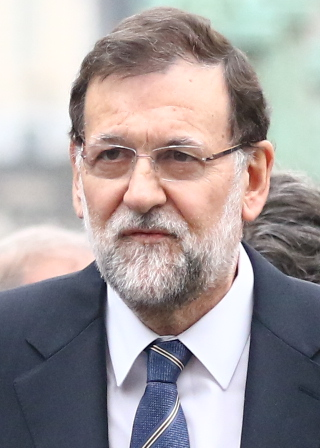
Spain
Mariano Rajoy, Prime Minister, permanent guest invitee

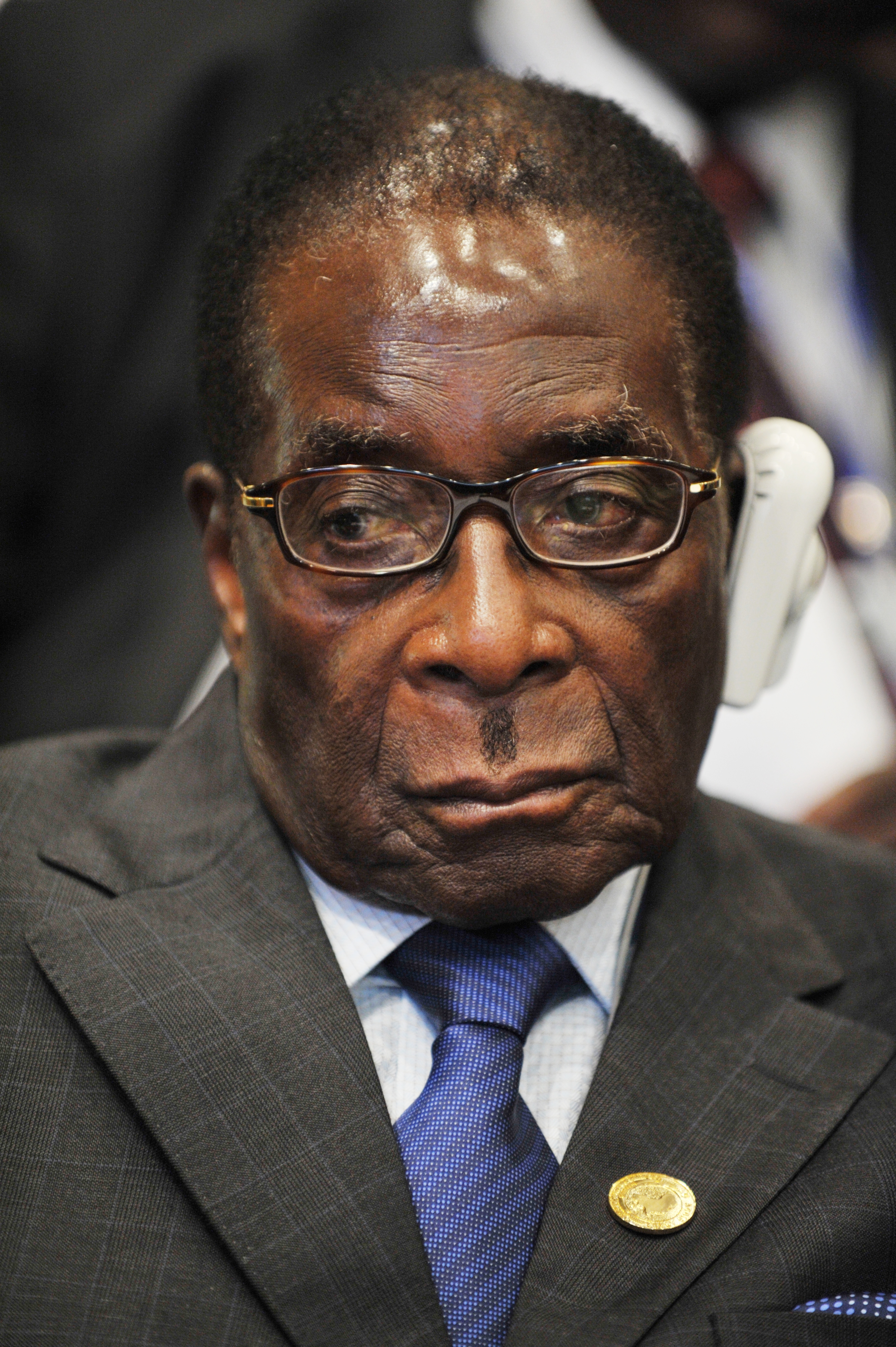
Zimbabwe
Robert Mugabe, President, 2015 Chair of African Union

=== Absent leaders ===
French President François Hollande did not attend the event due to the November 2015 Paris attacks and sent Foreign Minister Laurent Fabius as his representative. This meeting was the second time Argentine President could not be in attendance, Cristina Fernandez de Kirchner being represented by Economy Minister Axel Kicillof, owing to the timing of a general election on 22 November.
